= Sanremo Music Festival 1972 =

Italian song contest (22nd edition)

Dates and venue
- First night: 24 February 1972
- Second night: 25 February 1972
- Final night: 26 February 1972
- Venue: Sanremo Casino; Sanremo, Italy

Organisation
- Organiser: Municipality of Sanremo

Production
- Broadcaster: Radiotelevisione italiana (RAI)
- Director: Romolo Siena
- Artistic director: Elio Gigante
- Presenters: Mike Bongiorno and Sylva Koscina, Paolo Villaggio

Vote
- Number of entries: 28
- Winner: "I giorni dell'arcobaleno" Nicola Di Bari

The Sanremo Music Festival 1972 (Italian: Festival di Sanremo 1972), officially the 22nd Italian Song Festival (22º Festival della canzone italiana), was the 22nd annual Sanremo Music Festival, held at the Sanremo Casino in Sanremo between 24 and 26 February 1972. It was organised by the municipality of Sanremo and broadcast by Radiotelevisione italiana (RAI). The shows were presented by Mike Bongiorno, assisted by Sylva Koscina and Paolo Villaggio. Elio Gigante served as artistic director.

The winning song was "I giorni dell'arcobaleno" written by Nicola Di Bari, Dalmazio Masini and Piero Pintucci, and performed by Di Bari himself, who achieved his second victory in a row at the festival. After Di Bari won the 1971 edition of the show Canzonissima and subsequently became Italy's representative for the Eurovision Song Contest 1972, the song was chosen as his entry for the contest and went on to finish in 6th place.

It was the first edition to be organised solely by the municipality of Sanremo, who eliminated the double performance rule used continuously since the 1957 edition, introduced an electronic voting system and became the subject of controversy due to the song selection process.

In January 2022, all three shows were made available by Rai Teche to view on RAI's streaming service RaiPlay.

== Format ==
On 27 December 1971, a resolution was passed by the Sanremo city council to directly assume management of the festival's 1972 edition rather than entrust the organisation to a private intermediary as in previous years. The council approved a new set of regulations for the edition, implementing suggestions previously proposed by record companies in meetings with members of the city's administration. An executive committee composed of nine city councillors was created, tasked with organising the event. The regulations stated the competition would contain twenty-eight songs and rid of the double performance rule first introduced in the 1953 edition. On 8 January 1972, the mayor of Sanremo announced the municipality had chosen Elio Gigante as the festival's artistic director to assist the executive committee.

The festival took place between 24 and 26 February 1972 in the ballroom of the Sanremo Casino. The stage was designed by Gian Francesco Ramacci. The design moved the orchestra to the sides of the room to make way for a wall-size screen at the back of the stage. An Eidophor projector was used during the shows to project the voting sequence and camera shots of the artists backstage and while performing.

=== Voting system ===
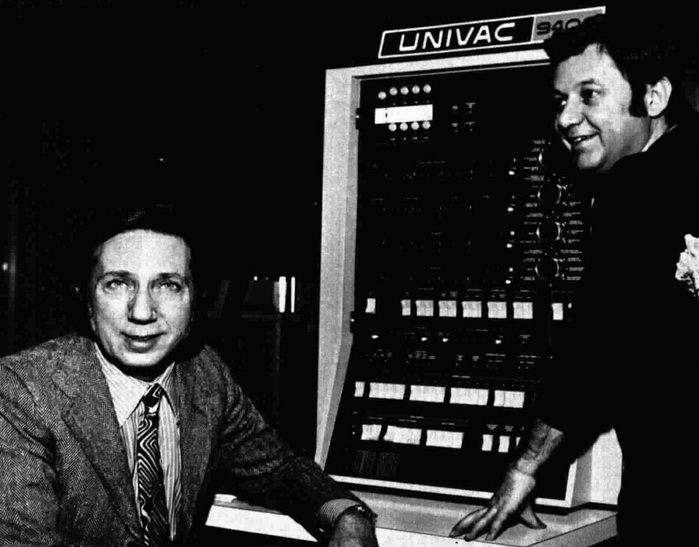
Presenters Mike Bongiorno and Paolo Villaggio with the computer used to calculate the results

A new voting system was implemented for the edition. The vote in each show was conducted by two different juries: a jury representing the twenty regions of Italy and a jury representing three different communities. A computer in Milan was in charge of choosing three hundred telephone numbers in each of Italy's twenty regions following a mathematical formula to draw them at random for each show. The lists were then sent to the editorial offices of nine different newspapers across Italy at which telephone operators called each number and chose fifty people to be jury members for each region. The computer also chose three different communities from a list of two hundred across Italy, including various schools, barracks and retirement homes among others, where another fifty jury members from each community were selected. In the first two nights, jury members representing both their regions and communities voted for three different songs. For the final, regional jury members were limited to voting for only one song, while communal jury members continued to vote for three songs. A backup jury composed of fifty randomly drawn spectators in the venue was to vote for seven songs during the first two nights in the event the results from the other two juries were not deemed sufficient in determining the seven finalists.

== Competing entries ==
For the first time, the song selection process for the contest involved inviting artists to submit songs directly. In January, the municipality sent invitations to over 170 artists and received song submissions from over a hundred. A special commission was tasked with selecting twenty-eight for the contest, composed of the journalists Egisto Corradi, Roberto Gervaso, Carlo Mazzarella and Angelo Sada, the conductors Franco Mannino, Alberto Zedda and Pippo Barzizza, the writer Mario Soldati, the politician Pasquale Lopez, the lawyer Roberto Moroni, record label representatives Aldo Bonomo and Luigi Edgardo Lisi, union representatives Gino Peguri, Benedetto Ghiglia, Mario Colangeli and Eraldo Villa, two members of Sanremo's public and the mayor of Sanremo Piero Parise, who chaired the commission and only voted in the event of a tie. The commission first narrowed down the list of submissions to thirty-two and asked nine other artists with submissions they had rejected to submit a different song, of which eight did. Another song was added to the list as it had arrived late, and from the forty-one songs, twenty-eight were selected to compete on 7 February. The commission also selected twelve reserve entries at a later date.

Competing entries
Song	Artist	Songwriter(s)	Conductor
"Ciao amico, ciao"	Aguaviva	Memo Remigi; Cristiano Minellono	Aldo Buonocore
"Portami via"	Angelica	Mario Mellier; Luciana Medini	Mario Mellier
"Era bello il mio ragazzo"	Anna Identici	Gianni Guarnieri; Pier Paolo Preti	Franco Orlandini
"Rimpianto"	Bobby Solo	Enrico Riccardi; Luigi Albertelli	Gian Piero Reverberi
"Il mio cuore se ne va"	Carla Bissi	Memo Remigi; Spiker	Aldo Buonocore
"Per amore ricomincerei"	Delia	Ciro Dammicco; Alberto Salerno; Marisa Terzi	Vince Tempera
"Jesahel"	Delirium	Oscar Prudente; Ivano Fossati	No conductor
"Un calcio alla città"	Domenico Modugno	Domenico Modugno; Mario Castellacci; Riccardo Pazzaglia	Piero Pintucci
"Ti voglio"	Donatello	Ricky Gianco; Dante Pieretti	Natale Massara
"L'uomo e il cane"	Fausto Leali	Fausto Leali; Milena Cantù	Gian Piero Reverberi
"Vado a lavorare"	Gianni Morandi	Marcello Marrocchi; Vittorio Tariciotti; Franco Migliacci; Petaluma	Piero Pintucci
"Non voglio innamorarmi mai"	Gianni Nazzaro	Giancarlo Bigazzi; Moreno Signorini	Gianfranco Monaldi
"Gira l'amore (Caro bebè)"	Gigliola Cinquetti	Mario Panzeri; Daniele Pace	Gianfranco Monaldi
"Un viaggio in Inghilterra"	I Nuovi Angeli	Ricky Gianco; Dante Pieretti	Gian Piero Reverberi
"Se non fosse fra queste mie braccia, lo inventerei"	Lara Saint Paul	Elide Suligoj; Luciano Beretta	Bill Conti
"Piazza Grande"	Lucio Dalla	Lucio Dalla; Rosalino Cellamare; Gianfranco Baldazzi; Sergio Bardotti	Ruggero Cini
"Montagne verdi"	Marcella	Giancarlo Bigazzi; Gianni Bella	Gianfranco Monaldi
"La foresta selvaggia"	Marisa Sacchetto	Claudio Cavallaro; Paolo Limiti	Alberto Baldan Bembo
"Forestiero"	Michele	Corrado Castellari; Stefano Scandolara; Sergio Bardotti	Enrico Intra
"Mediterraneo"	Milva	Enrico Riccardi; Luigi Albertelli	Natale Massara
"Il re di denari"	Nada	Claudio Mattone; Franco Migliacci	Ruggero Cini
"I giorni dell'arcobaleno"	Nicola Di Bari	Piero Pintucci; Nicola Di Bari; Dalmazio Masini	Gian Franco Reverberi
"Come le viole"	Peppino Gagliardi	Peppino Gagliardi; Gaetano Amendola	Bill Conti
"Ci sono giorni"	Pino Donaggio	Pino Donaggio; Vito Pallavicini	Aldo Buonocore
"Un diadema di ciliegie"	Ricchi e Poveri	Romano Bertola	Romano Farinatti
"Amici mai"	Rita Pavone	Caviri; Argante	Ruggero Cini
"Un gatto nel blu"	Roberto Carlos	Totò Savio	Renato Angiolini
"Preghiera"	Tony Cucchiara	Tony Cucchiara	Nando De Luca

== Shows ==
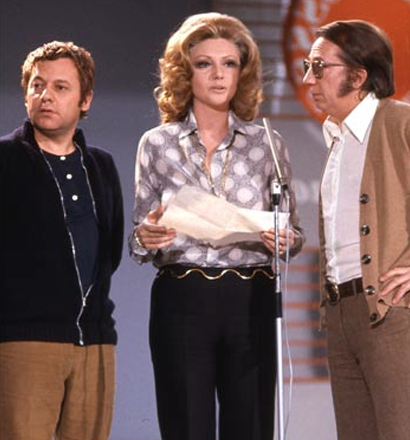
The festival's presenters—Paolo Villaggio, Sylva Koscina and Mike Bongiorno

The festival consisted of three shows held between 24 and 26 February 1972. Each night consisted of fourteen songs. A draw took place on 17 February at the Basilica of Sant'Eufemia in Milan, where first rehearsals for the contest were held, to determine the running order for the first two nights. The shows were presented by Mike Bongiorno, who was assisted by the actress Sylva Koscina, while the actor Paolo Villaggio provided comedic interludes throughout. The shows were directed by Romolo Siena.

Competing artists were able to be accompanied by the orchestra in the venue. In all three shows, instrumental recaps of the competing songs were played by the orchestra conducted by French composer Franck Pourcel, between performances during the first two nights and after all songs had performed during the final. Pourcel also composed the festival's theme song "St. Nicolas".

=== First night ===
The first night took place on 24 February 1972 at 21:15 CET. Fourteen artists performed their songs and seven were selected for the final.

Qualifier

First night – 24 February 1972
R/O	Song	Artist	Points	Place
1	"Ti voglio"	Donatello	267	5
2	"Ci sono giorni"	Pino Donaggio	122	13
3	"Era bello il mio ragazzo"	Anna Identici	171	8
4	"Per amore ricomincerei"	Delia	66	14
5	"Jesahel"	Delirium	240	7
6	"Un calcio alla città"	Domenico Modugno	363	3
7	"Preghiera"	Tony Cucchiara	164	10
8	"Il re di denari"	Nada	513	1
9	"Montagne verdi"	Marcella	329	4
10	"Piazza Grande"	Lucio Dalla	267	5
11	"Come le viole"	Peppino Gagliardi	494	2
12	"Il mio cuore se ne va"	Carla Bissi	164	10
13	"Un gatto nel blu"	Roberto Carlos	170	9
14	"Un viaggio in Inghilterra"	I Nuovi Angeli	130	12

=== Second night ===
The second night took place on 25 February 1972 at 21:15 CET. Fourteen artists performed their songs and seven were selected for the final.

Qualifier

Second night – 25 February 1972
R/O	Song	Artist	Points	Place
1	"Gira l'amore (Caro bebè)"	Gigliola Cinquetti	329	3
2	"I giorni dell'arcobaleno"	Nicola Di Bari	581	1
3	"Amici mai"	Rita Pavone	132	11
4	"Un diadema di ciliegie"	Ricchi e Poveri	268	6
5	"Forestiero"	Michele	161	9
6	"La foresta selvaggia"	Marisa Sacchetto	112	12
7	"Se non fosse fra queste mie braccia, lo inventerei"	Lara Saint Paul	327	4
8	"Mediterraneo"	Milva	239	7
9	"L'uomo e il cane"	Fausto Leali	102	13
10	"Rimpianto"	Bobby Solo	152	10
11	"Non voglio innamorarmi mai"	Gianni Nazzaro	310	5
12	"Ciao amico, ciao"	Aguaviva	55	14
13	"Vado a lavorare"	Gianni Morandi	503	2
14	"Portami via"	Angelica	166	8

=== Final night ===
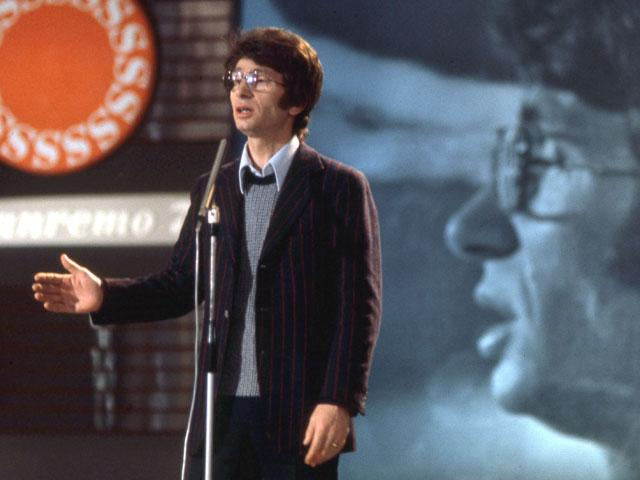
Nicola Di Bari performing "I giorni dell'arcobaleno"

The final night took place on 26 February 1972 at 21:00 CET. The fourteen finalists performed their songs again and a winner was chosen.

The winning song was "I giorni dell'arcobaleno" performed by Nicola Di Bari, written by Di Bari with Dalmazio Masini and Piero Pintucci. Di Bari had also won the festival in 1971, making him the fourth artist after Nilla Pizzi, Domenico Modugno and Johnny Dorelli to win twice in a row. "Come le viole" performed by Peppino Gagliardi, written by Gagliardi with Gaetano Amendola achieved second place, and "Il re di denari" performed by Nada, written by Claudio Mattone and Franco Migliacci, achieved third place. The top three songs were performed again at the end of the show.

"Jesahel" written by Ivano Fossati and Oscar Prudente, performed by the band Delirium, received a prize for the best lyrics among the competing songs. The band also received the Giorgio Berti award given to the best performer.

Winner

Final night – 26 February 1972
R/O	Song	Artist	Points	Place
1	"Se non fosse fra queste mie braccia, lo inventerei"	Lara Saint Paul	38	13
2	"Piazza Grande"	Lucio Dalla	68	8
3	"Jesahel"	Delirium	105	6
4	"Come le viole"	Peppino Gagliardi	160	2
5	"Vado a lavorare"	Gianni Morandi	139	4
6	"Un diadema di ciliegie"	Ricchi e Poveri	57	11
7	"Mediterraneo"	Milva	43	12
8	"I giorni dell'arcobaleno"	Nicola Di Bari	343	1
9	"Un calcio alla città"	Domenico Modugno	28	14
10	"Montagne verdi"	Marcella	84	7
11	"Ti voglio"	Donatello	63	10
12	"Gira l'amore (Caro bebè)"	Gigliola Cinquetti	67	9
13	"Non voglio innamorarmi mai"	Gianni Nazzaro	114	5
14	"Il re di denari"	Nada	141	3

Detailed voting results of the final
R/O	Song	Campania	Abruzzo	Basilicata	Calabria	Emilia-Romagna	Friuli-Venezia Giulia	Lazio	Liguria	Lombardy	Marche	Molise	Piedmont	Apulia	Sardinia	Sicily	Tuscany	Trentino-South Tyrol	Umbria	Aosta Valley	Veneto	22nd Infantry Regiment "Cremona"	SS. Annunziata State Boarding School	Italian Naval Academy	Total
1	"Se non fosse fra queste mie braccia, lo inventerei"		1	1		1	2	3		2	3		2				1	3		1	2	7	6	3	38
2	"Piazza Grande"		2	2		2	1	2	4	1	3	1	3		3		3	3	5	5	3	6	7	12	68
3	"Jesahel"	1	1	1	1	2	3	3	2	3		4	3	2	2	2	2	2	2	4	7	8	22	28	105
4	"Come le viole"	20	7	10	8	3	3	9	3	3	4	12	5	4	6	6	4	6	6	5	5	19	6	6	160
5	"Vado a lavorare"	5	7	3	2	10	5	9	4	9	4	4	3	4	8	4	7	7	4	6	3	15	14	2	139
6	"Un diadema di ciliegie"	1				2	2		2	2	4		1		2			1	4	2	4	5	4	21	57
7	"Mediterraneo"		1		1	2	3	1	2	1	5	2	3	2	1	1	2	3	4	2	1		6		43
8	"I giorni dell'arcobaleno"	8	17	16	16	14	14	12	14	10	15	19	12	24	15	11	8	12	12	10	11	29	20	24	343
9	"Un calcio alla città"		2	1	1	2	1			1	1			4			3	1	1	2	1	1	4	2	28
10	"Montagne verdi"	2	2	2	4	2	4		2	1	4	2	3	1		11	1	1	2	2	1	7	16	14	84
11	"Ti voglio"		1	2				1	1	1	1	1	1		1	1		1				22	14	15	63
12	"Gira l'amore (Caro bebè)"		5	2	3	6	5		5	4	2		3	2	2	5		2	3		6	6	3	3	67
13	"Non voglio innamorarmi mai"	8	2	1	6	3	2	1	4	4	2	2	4	2	3	4	4	4	3	2	3	13	19	18	114
14	"Il re di denari"	5	2	9	8	1	5	9	7	8	2	3	7	5	7	5	15	4	4	9	3	12	9	2	141

== Broadcasts ==
=== Local broadcast ===
The final was broadcast on Programma Nazionale (television) and Secondo Programma (radio) beginning at 21:00 CET. The first two nights were broadcast on Secondo Programma (television) and Secondo Programma (radio) at 21:15 CET. The final was broadcast on television in Italy to an estimated 26.3 million viewers.

=== International broadcast ===
Part of the final was broadcast via the Eurovision and Intervision networks in other countries. The festival was reportedly aired by broadcasters in Monaco, France, Germany, Switzerland, Portugal and Greece via Eurovision, in the Soviet Union, East Germany, Poland, Czechoslovakia, Bulgaria and Hungary via Intervision as well as in Venezuela, Peru, Mexico and Canada. Known details on the broadcasts in each country, including the specific broadcasting stations and commentators are shown in the tables below.

International broadcasters of the Sanremo Music Festival 1972
Country	Broadcaster	Channel(s)	Commentator(s)	Ref(s)
Chile	UCTV	Canal 13 (Note: Delayed broadcast with the first part broadcast on 1 March at 22:25 (CLST), and the second part broadcast on 2 March at 22:20 (CLST).)		
Japan	NHK	NHK (Note: Delayed broadcast on 20 May at 14:10 (JST))	Yutaka Ishida	
Spain	SER	Radio Barcelona		
Spain	SER	Radio Girona		
Spain	SER	Radio Huesca		
Spain	SER	Radio San Sebastián		
Spain	SER	Radio Zaragoza		
United States	WNJU-TV (Note: Delayed broadcast on 7 May at 15:00 (EDT))			
Yugoslavia	JRT	TV Beograd 1, TV Zagreb 1		
Yugoslavia	JRT	TV Koper-Capodistria		
Yugoslavia	JRT	TV Ljubljana 1		

== Incidents and controversies ==
=== Controversy ===
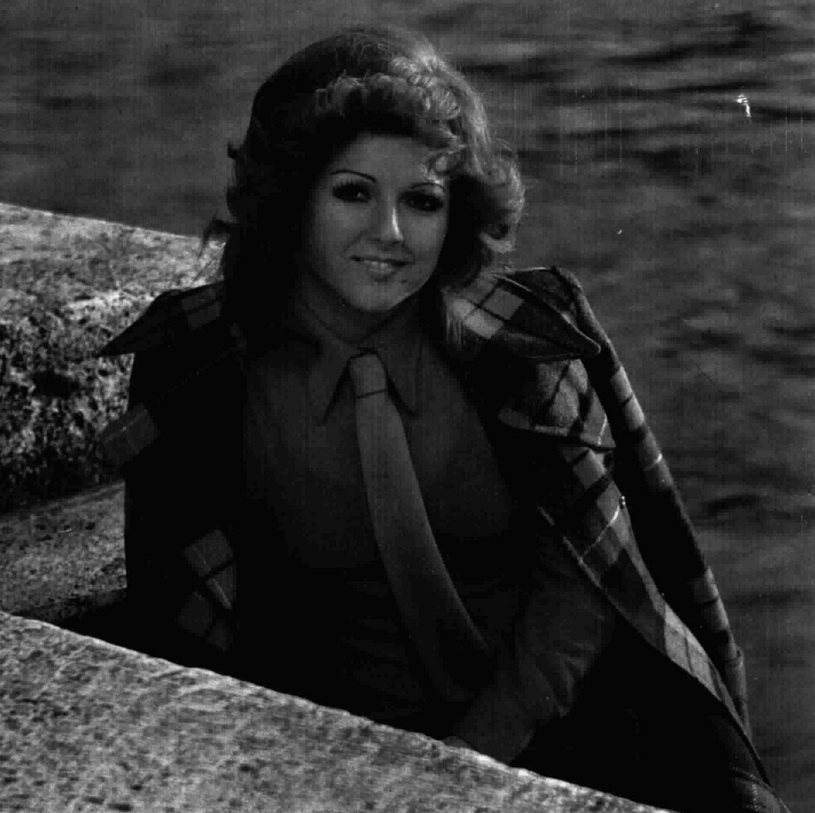
Orietta Berti, one of the artists rejected for the competition

The decision made by the festival's song selection commission to allow only nine artists to submit a second song was the result of controversy in the lead-up to the event. During a press conference, one of the commission members Roberto Moroni explained the decision: "Regarding Gianni Morandi's song—the committee's opinion was negative. However, the opinion on the singer's performance wasn't negative, hence the decision to grant the possibility of an appeal. For Orietta Berti, however, the negative opinion on the song was followed by a negative opinion on her performance". Reports from the commission meetings, made public by the municipality in the days following the selection process, clarify the commission held a vote to determine which artists received a second submission request.

Following the song selection process, Berti's record company Phonogram Inc. filed a legal request to invalidate the work of the commission and suspend the event. They claimed there were irregularities in the application of the rules during the song selection process—primarily with an article of the regulations authorizing the commission to allow extended deadlines for artists to submit songs replacing ones that were rejected "for proven and justified artistic reasons". They also claimed other rules were violated, such as the rule prohibiting commission members from having ties to the pop music industry, of which commission members Gino Peguri and Benedetto Ghiglia had. Gian Piero Simontacchi, president of the record label Società italiana fonografica (SIF) on behalf of the artist Piero Focaccia, whose submission was placed on the list of reserves, also filed a legal request to suspend the festival due to irregularities by both the commission and Sanremo's municipal council. A number of other requests were filed against the municipality, including one from the artist Rosalino, who claimed the municipality violated an article of the regulations requiring invited artists to have a particular level of notoriety. On 18 February, all requests were rejected by the magistrate of the Sanremo court.

=== Strike ===
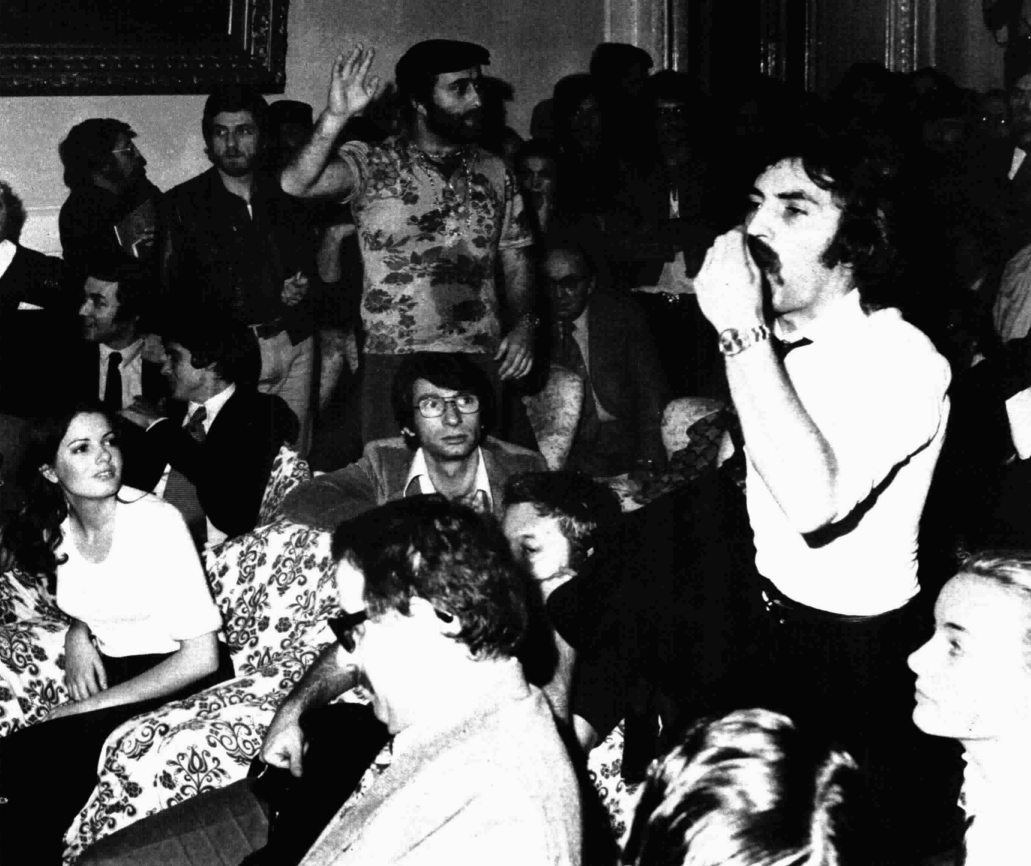
Artists discussing the strike announced by CISAS at the Hotel Savoy in Sanremo

After holding an assembly on 11 February, the artists union Unione cantanti italiana (UCI) announced an official "state of unrest" due to the alleged violations of the festival's regulations during its organisation, also stating the municipality's actions did not align with the union's objectives.

On 21 February, the performing arts union confederation Confederazione italiana sindacati artisti dello spettacolo (CISAS), which UCI was a part of, called a national strike of pop music singers, ensembles and conductors in protest of the festival, with the aim to postpone the event due to the violations of the festival's regulations, as well as the choice to invite French conductor Franck Pourcel to the event rather than a conductor of Italian origin. On 23 February, twelve artists competing in the festival signed a declaration of solidarity with the unions' decision, although rehearsals commenced as usual. Two artists, Milva and Donatello, revoked their signatures after the declaration failed to gain support from all competing artists. Later that day, a meeting between representatives of the municipality of Sanremo and CISAS took place, in which an agreement was reached to work with RAI to secure the production of a television special featuring Italian artists and conductors. A press release following the meeting confirmed CISAS would suspend the strike.
