= Sanremo Music Festival 1976 =

Italian song contest (26th edition)

Dates and venue
- First night: 19 February 1976
- Second night: 20 February 1976
- Final night: 21 February 1976
- Venue: Sanremo Casino; Sanremo, Italy

Organisation
- Organiser: Vittorio Salvetti

Production
- Broadcaster: Radiotelevisione italiana (RAI)
- Directors: Adriana Parrella; Enrico Moscatelli
- Musical director: Riccardo Vantellini
- Presenter: Giancarlo Guardabassi

Vote
- Number of entries: 30
- Winner: "Non lo faccio più" Peppino di Capri

The Sanremo Music Festival 1976 (Italian: Festival di Sanremo 1976), officially the 26th Italian Song Festival (26º Festival della canzone italiana), was the 26th annual Sanremo Music Festival, held at the Sanremo Casino in Sanremo between 19 and 21 February 1976. It was organised by Vittorio Salvetti under sponsorship from the municipality of Sanremo and broadcast by Radiotelevisione italiana (RAI). The shows were presented by the radio disc jockey Giancarlo Guardabassi.

For the first and only time in the festival's history, the format involved a competition between teams of artists. The winning team consisted of the artists I Camaleonti, Opera and Sandro Giacobbe. The winning song was "Non lo faccio più" written by Depsa, Fabrizio Berlincioni and Sergio Iodice, and performed by Peppino di Capri.

== Format ==
Following the commercially unsuccessful 1975 edition, the municipality of Sanremo chose not to continue organising the festival directly and instead sponsor an established impresario to organise the event. In November, they appointed a commission composed of representatives from each of Italy's political parties, tasked with selecting the organiser for the 1976 edition. On 12 December, the commission unanimously decided to entrust the festival's organisation to Vittorio Salvetti, who had served in the role for the 1974 edition, over proposals from Gianni Ravera, Elio Gigante and Mario Salinelli. Salvetti's proposal for the festival involved making numerous changes to the format in an attempt to renew interest in the event, such as dividing the competing artists into teams for the first time.

Due to a series of renovations scheduled in the ballroom of the Sanremo Casino, which were postponed until after the event's conclusion, the 1976 edition was the last to be held in the casino, after it became unable to host the following editions and the Teatro Ariston eventually became the festival's permanent venue. The large orchestra in the ballroom traditionally featured at the event was announced to be replaced by a smaller orchestra relegated to performing instrumental pieces between the competing songs as well as the opening and closing themes, while artists performed their songs to a backing track. Salvetti stated the change was made to "better appeal to young people accustomed to hearing flawless studio recordings". Although intended to be an 18-piece orchestra, the number of instruments was doubled after a request from musician unions. Riccardo Vantellini was appointed as the festival's musical director and the musicians Henghel Gualdi, Bruno Martino, Glauco Masetti, Ely Neri and Tullio De Piscopo were included as guest soloists.

Salvetti invited numerous foreign artists to perform at the festival as guests, marking the event as the "first international Sanremo". Nine foreign artists performed during the shows, each presenting new songs and representing a city in their country of origin. The artists' performances were recorded in the days preceding the final; two minutes of each were shown during the show, with the intention of airing them in full as television specials at a later date.

=== Voting ===
A total of thirty artists were chosen to compete, initially divided into five teams of six artists. Two artists from each team were designated team captains given an automatic place in the final, performing during the first two nights without facing a vote, while the other four artists risked elimination. After the vote, the first-placed artist in each team qualified directly to the final, joining the team captains, while the second-placed artists qualified for a spot in a repechage round held during the second night. Through the repechage, an additional three artists were selected for the final, forming a sixth team. In the final night, the six teams, which now consisted of three artists each, performed their songs again and were voted on individually to determine the winning song. The team that received the most points across its three songs was declared the winning team.

The voting was conducted by fifteen juries formed by as many newspapers in Italy and stationed at their respective editorial offices during the shows. Juries consisted of twenty-five members drawn randomly for each night from a pool of applicants, with fifteen members required to be between the ages of 15 and 25, five between the ages of 25 and 40, and five over the age of 40. Each jury member voted for one song from each team during the first two nights and one song in the final. The vote in the repechage round was conducted by one correspondent from each of the fifteen newspapers.

== Competing entries ==
In a change from previous years, the festival's song selection process did not involve the organisers appointing a commission. Instead Vittorio Salvetti invited artists directly to the competition, each of whom was allowed free choice over their competing song. Also unlike previous years, artists did not have to pay a registration fee to participate. Thirty artists were selected and divided into five teams, with ten of the most popular artists serving as team captains. The competing teams, including the artists and their songs, were announced on 12 February.

Competing entries
Song	Artist	Songwriter(s)
"Volo AZ 504"	Albatros	Salvatore Cutugno; Vito Pallavicini
"La femminista"	Antonio Buonomo	Eduardo Alfieri; Leo Chiosso
"Stella cadente"	Armonium	Franco Zulian; Vincenzo Stavolo
"Più forte"	Carlo Gigli	Luigi Gigli; Luciano Schiava
"Linda bella Linda"	Daniel Sentacruz Ensemble	Querencio; Zacar; Sentacruz; Francesco Specchia
"Sambariò"	Drupi	Enrico Riccardi; Luigi Albertelli
"Uomo qualunque"	Ezio Maria Picciotta	Ezio Maria Picciotta; Dario Farina; Franco Migliacci
"La canzone dei poveri"	Gloriana	Nunzio Gallo; Augusto Visco; Raffaele Mallozzi; Franco Colosimo
"Cuore di vetro"	I Camaleonti	Giancarlo Bigazzi; Totò Savio
"Cercati un'anima"	I Profeti	Claudio Cavallaro; Donato Ciletti; Daniele Pace; Oscar Avogadro
"Che sarei"	La Nuova Gente	Giuseppe Landro; Ettore Cardullo
"Andiamo via"	La Strana Società	Corrado Conti; Franco Cassano; Luigi Albertelli
"Nata libera"	Leano Morelli	Enzo Crippa; Leano Morelli
"Sing My Song"	Maggie Mae	Cesare De Natale; Piero Darini
"Signora tu"	Miko	Graziano Pegoraro; Pier Michele Bozzetti
"L'ho persa ancora"	Opera	Filiberto Ricciardi; Daniele Pace; Oscar Avogadro
"Omar"	Orietta Berti	Lumni; Luciano Beretta
"Due anelli"	Paolo Frescura	Paolo Frescura; Antonello De Sanctis
"Piccola donna addio"	Patrizio Sandrelli	Franco Zulian; Vincenzo Stavolo
"Non lo faccio più"	Peppino di Capri	Depsa; Fabrizio Berlincioni; Sergio Iodice
"Due storie dei musicanti"	Ricchi e Poveri	Luis Bacalov; Sergio Bardotti
"Non due"	Romina Power	Romina Power; Albano Carrisi
"Il mio primo rossetto"	Rosanna Fratello	Umberto Napolitano; Alberto Salerno
"Gli occhi di tua madre"	Sandro Giacobbe	Sandro Giacobbe; Daniele Pace; Oscar Avogadro
"E tu mi manchi"	Santino Rocchetti	Andrea Lo Vecchio; Simon Luca
"Quando c'era il mare"	Sergio Endrigo	Sergio Endrigo; Luis Bacalov
"Vieni"	Silvano Vittorio	Andrea Lo Vecchio; Silvano Vittorio
"Una casa senza nome"	Umberto Lupi	Lorenzo Pilat; Mario Panzeri; Daniele Pace
"Torno a casa"	Vanna Leali	Elide Suligoj; Paolo Limiti
"Come stai, con chi sei"	Wess and Dori Ghezzi	Umberto Balsamo; Cristiano Minellono

== Shows ==
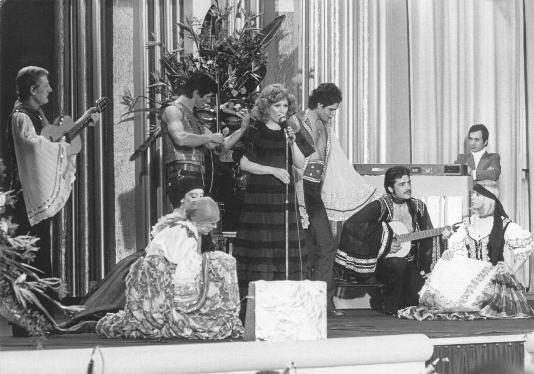
Orietta Berti performing her song "Omar" at the festival

The festival consisted of three shows held between 19 and 21 February 1976, presented by the radio disc jockey Giancarlo Guardabassi. The radio director for the shows was Adriana Parrella, while the television director was Enrico Moscatelli. The song "Riviera in" performed on saxophone by Glauco Masetti and composed by the festival's musical director, Riccardo Vantellini, served as the event's opening theme.

The shows were presented in a similar format to a radio show; Guardabassi sat at a booth to the side of the stage for the entirety of each night, introducing the artists and guests. He was accompanied by two models in each show with non-speaking roles: Serena Albano and Maddalena Galliani for the first night, Stella Luna and Lorena Rosetta Nardulli for the second night, and Tiziana Pini and Karla Strano Pavese for the final night. Salvetti initially announced Domenico Modugno would be the festival's presenter, but Modugno refuted the claim during an interview shortly after, and had to be replaced last-minute with Guardabassi after invitations to Renzo Arbore and Carole André to fill the role were rejected.

The actors Marcello Mastroianni and Claudia Mori were scheduled to perform their song "Come una Cenerentola" during the festival as guest performers, but withdrew a few days before the start of the event. Additionally, as late as the day of the final, the operatic tenor Mario Del Monaco was listed by press as a guest performer for the night performing a rendition of "'O sole mio" and his song "Un amore così grande", but did not attend the festival because of illness.

A charity gala dedicated to the Food and Agriculture Organization (FAO) was held on 22 February in the ballroom of the Sanremo Casino as a collateral event to the festival, organised by Mario Salinelli and the municipality of Sanremo. The festival's winners, Peppino di Capri, I Camaleonti, Opera and Sandro Giacobbe, performed their songs at the gala alongside other Italian and international performers including Fiorenza Cossotto, Manuela Carrasco and Cristiano Rossi. The show was hosted by the actors Walter Chiari and Barbara Bouchet, and broadcast abroad via the Eurovision network, with RAI airing it on 14 March.

=== First night ===
The first night took place on 19 February 1976 at 20:30 CET. The first three teams, consisting of eighteen artists in total, performed their songs and one artist from each team was selected for the final. The team captains, who automatically qualified for the final, were Sergio Endrigo and Peppino di Capri for the first team, Wess and Dori Ghezzi and Orietta Berti for the second team, and Sandro Giacobbe and I Camaleonti for the third team.

Qualifier
Repechage qualifier
Automatic qualifier

First team – 19 February 1976
R/O	Song	Artist	Place
1	"La canzone dei poveri"	Gloriana	2
2	"Piccola donna addio"	Patrizio Sandrelli	1
3	"La femminista"	Antonio Buonomo	—N/a
4	"Non due"	Romina Power	—N/a
5	"Quando c'era il mare"	Sergio Endrigo	A.Q.
6	"Non lo faccio più"	Peppino di Capri	A.Q.

Second team – 19 February 1976
R/O	Song	Artist	Place
1	"E tu mi manchi"	Santino Rocchetti	3
2	"Nata libera"	Leano Morelli	2
3	"Il mio primo rossetto"	Rosanna Fratello	4
4	"Andiamo via"	La Strana Società	1
5	"Come stai, con chi sei"	Wess and Dori Ghezzi	A.Q.
6	"Omar"	Orietta Berti	A.Q.

Third team – 19 February 1976
R/O	Song	Artist	Place
1	"Una casa senza nome"	Umberto Lupi	—N/a
2	"Torno a casa"	Vanna Leali	—N/a
3	"Cercati un'anima"	I Profeti	2
4	"L'ho persa ancora"	Opera	1
5	"Gli occhi di tua madre"	Sandro Giacobbe	A.Q.
6	"Cuore di vetro"	I Camaleonti	A.Q.

=== Second night ===
The second night took place on 20 February 1976 at 20:30 CET. The fourth and fifth teams, consisting of twelve artists in total, performed their songs and one artist from each team was selected for the final. The team captains, who automatically qualified for the final, were Paolo Frescura and Ricchi e Poveri for the fourth team, and Daniel Sentacruz Ensemble and Drupi for the fifth team. The repechage round took place at the end of the night and consisted of performances from five artists, of which three were selected for the final.

Qualifier
Repechage qualifier
Automatic qualifier

Fourth team – 20 February 1976
R/O	Song	Artist	Points	Place
1	"Più forte"	Carlo Gigli	117	1
2	"Che sarei"	La Nuova Gente	93	2
3	"Uomo qualunque"	Ezio Maria Picciotta	77	4
4	"Sing My Song"	Maggie Mae	87	3
5	"Due anelli"	Paolo Frescura	A.Q.	
6	"Due storie dei musicanti"	Ricchi e Poveri	A.Q.	

Fifth team – 20 February 1976
R/O	Song	Artist	Points	Place
1	"Stella cadente"	Armonium	75	4
2	"Vieni"	Silvano Vittorio	82	3
3	"Volo AZ 504"	Albatros	100	2
4	"Signora tu"	Miko	117	1
5	"Linda bella Linda"	Daniel Sentacruz Ensemble	A.Q.	
6	"Sambariò"	Drupi	A.Q.	

Repechage – 20 February 1976
R/O	Song	Artist	Result
1	"La canzone dei poveri"	Gloriana	—N/a
2	"Nata libera"	Leano Morelli	—N/a
3	"Cercati un'anima"	I Profeti	Qualified
4	"Che sarei"	La Nuova Gente	Qualified
5	"Volo AZ 504"	Albatros	Qualified

=== Final night ===
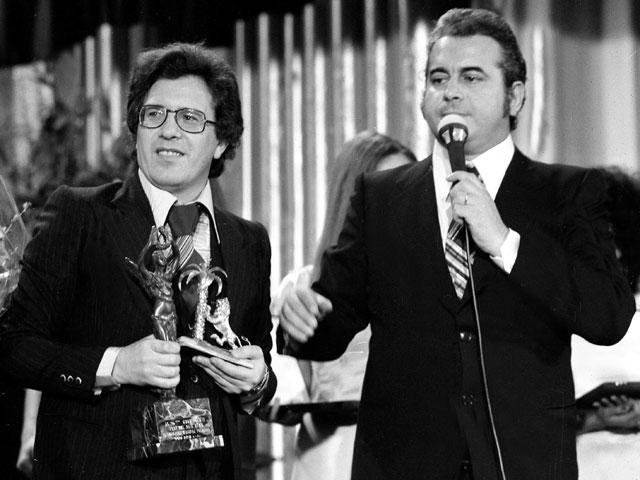
Peppino di Capri (left) after his victory next to organiser Vittorio Salvetti

The final night took place on 21 February 1976 at 20:40 CET. The remaining artists in each of the five teams, in addition to a sixth team composed of artists that qualified from the repechage round, totalling eighteen finalists, performed their songs again. A winning song and a winning team were chosen.

Guest appearances included the comedian Erminio Macario performing his song "Sanremo Sanremo", Rita Pavone performing her songs "Sono proprio uno schianto" and "E... zitto zitto", and Domenico Modugno performing a melody of his past hits in addition to his songs "Vecchio frac" and "Il maestro di violino". During the voting interval, performances from the foreign artists Salvatore Adamo, Les Humphries Singers, Morris Albert, Esther Phillips, the Bay City Rollers, Suzi Quatro, Jacky James, the Chanter Sisters and Julio Iglesias were included in the show; the latter four of which were excluded from the Italian television broadcast in favour of the evening news.

The winning song was "Non lo faccio più" written by Depsa, Fabrizio Berlincioni and Sergio Iodice, and performed by Peppino di Capri. It was di Capri's second victory at the festival, following his win in 1973. The winning team consisted of the artists I Camaleonti, Opera and Sandro Giacobbe, amassing 75 points overall.

Winner

Final night – 21 February 1976
R/O	Song	Artist	Points	Place
1	"Due storie dei musicanti"	Ricchi e Poveri	10	13
2	"Più forte"	Carlo Gigli	23	7
3	"Due anelli"	Paolo Frescura	30	5
4	"Quando c'era il mare"	Sergio Endrigo	6	15
5	"Piccola donna addio"	Patrizio Sandrelli	9	14
6	"Non lo faccio più"	Peppino di Capri	46	1
7	"Come stai, con chi sei"	Wess and Dori Ghezzi	40	2
8	"Andiamo via"	La Strana Società	11	12
9	"Omar"	Orietta Berti	16	11
10	"Cuore di vetro"	I Camaleonti	19	10
11	"L'ho persa ancora"	Opera	20	9
12	"Gli occhi di tua madre"	Sandro Giacobbe	36	3
13	"Linda bella Linda"	Daniel Sentacruz Ensemble	21	8
14	"Sambariò"	Drupi	24	6
15	"Signora tu"	Miko	6	15
16	"Che sarei"	La Nuova Gente	3	18
17	"Volo AZ 504"	Albatros	36	3
18	"Cercati un'anima"	I Profeti	5	17

== Broadcasts ==
=== Local broadcast ===
In January, the Sanremo city councillor Fulvio Ballestra indicated that after negotiations during a meeting between RAI executives and representatives of the municipality of Sanremo, it was likely all three nights of the festival would be broadcast on television. However, RAI later confirmed no changes would be made to their programming schedule and reaffirmed they would only broadcast the final on television. In response, during the week of the festival, the municipality installed screens outside the Sanremo Casino and at the city's Corso Imperatrice that allowed the public to watch live video transmissions of all three shows.

The first two nights were broadcast via radio on Secondo Programma beginning at 20:30 CET. The final was broadcast on both Programma Nazionale (television) and Secondo Programma (radio) beginning at 20:40 CET. The final was broadcast on television in Italy to an estimated 23.5 million viewers.

=== International broadcasts ===
The final was broadcast abroad via the Eurovision network. Known details on the broadcasts in each country, including the specific broadcasting stations and commentators are shown in the tables below.

International broadcasters of the Sanremo Music Festival 1976
Country	Broadcaster	Channel(s)	Commentator(s)	Ref(s)
Argentina	Canal 9 (Note: Delayed broadcast on 16 and 23 March at 21:30 (ART))			
Chile	UCTV	Canal 13 (Note: Delayed broadcast on 29 February at 21:30 (CST))		
Greece	EIRT	EIRT (Note: Delayed broadcast on 6 March at 23:30 (EET))		
Hungary	MTV	MTV2 (Note: Delayed broadcast on 27 August at 20:01 (CET))		
Romania	TVR	Programul 1 (Note: Delayed broadcast in a shortened format on 29 February at 21:45 (EET))		
South Korea	DBC (Note: Delayed broadcast on 23 March at 20:50 (KST))			
Turkey	TRT	TRT Televizyon		
United States	WNJU-TV (Note: Delayed broadcast on 28 March at 15:00 (EDT))			
