= Nell'aria =

Single by Marcella Bella

from the album Nell'aria
- B-side: "Non mi avrai"
- Released: 1983
- Label: CBS
- Composer: Gianni Bella
- Lyricist: Mogol

Marcella Bella singles chronology
"Problemi" (1982)	"Nell'aria" (1983)	"Nel mio cielo puro" (1984)

Audio
- "Nell'aria" on YouTube

"Nell'aria" (transl. "In the air") is a 1983 song written by Gianni Bella (music) and Mogol (lyrics), and performed by Marcella Bella.

== Background ==
The song marked one of the early collaborations between Mogol and composer Gianni Bella, previously a longtime collaborator of Giancarlo Bigazzi. Marcella initially refused to record the song, considering it "pornographic" because of its sexual contents and innuendos. It achieved a large commercial success, serving as a turning point in the singer's career, who since then adopted a more sexy and transgressive image.

The song has been described as "unusual and original, whose melody plays on open, airy modulations and cadences" and with Bella's voice "conveying a warm carnality".

The song was sampled by 2Black in the song "Paradise" and by Articolo 31 in the song "Aria"

== Track listing ==
No.	Title	Lyrics	Music	Length
1.	"Nell'aria"	Mogol	Gianni Bella	4:05
2.	"Non mi avrai"	Cheope	Mauro Paoluzzi	4:00

== Charts ==
Chart performance for "Nell'aria"
Chart (1983)	Peak position
Italy (Musica e dischi)	7

== Certifications and sales ==
Certifications for "Nell'aria"
Region	Certification	Certified units/sales
Italy (FIMI) sales from 2009	Gold	50,000^{‡}
^{‡} Sales+streaming figures based on certification alone.
