= Profeti =

Profeti may refer to:

== People ==
- Angiolo Profeti (1918-1981), Italian shot putter and discus thrower
- Renato dei Profeti (born 1948), Italian singer, composer, musician and producer

== Other uses ==
- I Profeti (acrive 1960s-1970s), an Italian pop group
- Profeti della Quinta, a male vocal ensemble specializing in the music of the Renaissance and Baroque periods
