= Lady Barbara =

Single by Renato dei Profeti
- B-side: "L'Università"
- Released: April 1970
- Genre: Pop Rock
- Length: 3:44
- Label: CBS
- Songwriters: Totò Savio, Giancarlo Bigazzi, Claudio Cavallaro
- Producers: Alfredo Cerruti, Elio Gariboldi

Renato dei Profeti singles chronology
| "Lady Barbara" (1970) | "Verità che batti nella mente" (1970) |

"Lady Barbara" is a song written by Totò Savio, Giancarlo Bigazzi, and Claudio Cavallaro and performed by Renato dei Profeti, founder of the group I Profeti at his first solo venture. The song won the Un disco per l'estate festival and peaked at first place on the Italian hit parade. The same year the song also named a musicarello film, Lady Barbara, directed by Mario Amendola and starred by the same Renato dei Profeti.

The same year the song was adapted into English by Errol Brown and Tony Wilson, and the cover version performed by Peter Noone and Herman's Hermits, reached No. 7 in New Zealand and No. 13 in the United Kingdom in 1970. It was the last single of the Herman's Hermits that featured Peter Noone. This version was produced by Mickie Most.
