= Hitalia =

Studio album by Gianna Nannini
- Released: 2014
- Studio: Abbey Road Studios
- Length: 56:59
- Label: RCA Records, Sony Music
- Producer: Gianna Nannini, Wil Malone

Gianna Nannini chronology
Inno (2013)	Hitalia (2014)	Amore gigante (2017)

Hitalia is a Gianna Nannini's studio album, released in 2014 and consisting of cover versions of classic Italian pop songs.

== Production ==
Nannini recorded the album at Abbey Road Studios in London, under the co-production of Wil Malone. Nannini described the album as "a sung biography", for which she chose the songs following "an emotional path, not an intellectual one", and explained the decision to record a cover album as the necessity of doing something different from her last works. The album features Gino Paoli, Vasco Rossi and Massimo Ranieri as guests. Notably, Ivano Fossati's "Dedicato" incorporates an extra verse absent from Loredana Bertè's original version.

== Release ==
Anticipated by the lead single "Lontano dagli occhi", the album was released on 1 December 2014.

== Track listing ==
Hitalia track listing
No.	Title	Writer(s)	Length
1.	"Dio è morto"	Francesco Guccini	2:51
2.	"L'immensità"	Don Backy, Mogol, Detto Mariano	2:57
3.	"Lontano dagli occhi"	Sergio Endrigo, Sergio Bardotti, Luis Bacalov	3:39
4.	"Il cielo in una stanza (feat. Gino Paoli)"	Gino Paoli	3:25
5.	"Dedicato"	Ivano Fossati	3:20
6.	"La canzone di Marinella"	Fabrizio De André	3:28
7.	"C'è chi dice no (feat. Vasco Rossi)"	Vasco Rossi, Maurizio Solieri	3:35
8.	"Io che non vivo (senza te)"	Pino Donaggio, Vito Pallavicini	2:50
9.	"Io che amo solo te"	Endrigo	3:12
10.	"Mamma"	Bixio Cherubini, Cesare Andrea Bixio	3:36
11.	"Insieme a te non ci sto più"	Pallavicini, Paolo Conte	3:22
12.	"Caruso"	Lucio Dalla	5:03
13.	"Il mondo"	Gianni Meccia, Italo Greco, Carlo Pes, Jimmy Fontana	2:41
14.	"Pugni chiusi"	Luciano Beretta, Ricky Gianco, Gianni Dall'Aglio	2:29
15.	"'O sole mio (feat. Massimo Ranieri)"	Giovanni Capurro, Eduardo Di Capua, Alfredo Mazzucchi	3:13
16.	"Un'avventura"	Lucio Battisti, Mogol	3:38
17.	"Volare (Nel blu dipinto di blu)"	Domenico Modugno, Franco Migliacci	3:40

Hitalia – iTunes bonus track
No.	Title	Writer(s)	Length
18.	"Bella senz'anima"	Riccardo Cocciante, Marco Luberti, Paolo Casella	2:47

== Charts ==
Chart (2014)	Peak position
Italy (FIMI)	1
Switzerland (Schweizer Hitparade)	16

== Certifications ==
Region	Certification	Certified units/sales
Italy (FIMI)	3× Platinum	150,000^{‡}
^{‡} Sales+streaming figures based on certification alone.
