= Riccardo Tesi =

Italian musician (born 1956)

- Born: Riccardo Tesi; 18 February 1956
- Origin: Pistoia, Tuscany, Italy
- Genres: Folk music, Italian folk music, Chanson, World music
- Occupation: Singer-songwriter
- Instruments: Vocals, guitar, acoustic guitar, classical guitar
- Years active: 1978–present
- Website: riccardotesi.com

Riccardo Tesi (Italian pronunciation: [rikˈkardo ˈteːzi]; born 1956 in Pistoia, Tuscany, Italy) is an Italian musician. He specializes in folk music. His instrument is the diatonic accordion or melodeon. He has founded or recorded with a number of groups, including Banditaliana and Ritmia. Tesi has released several solo albums and has also worked with such musicians as John Kirkpatrick, Elena Ledda, Piero Pelu, Ivano Fossati, Ornella Vanoni, Patrick Vaillant and Fabrizio De André, among others.

== Discography ==
=== As leader ===
- Riccardo Tesi & Patrick Vaillant – Veranda (1991)
- Riccardo Tesi – Il Ballo Della Lepre (1993)
- Riccardo Tesi & Patrick Vaillant – Colline (1994)
- Riccardo Tesi – Banditaliana (1999)
- Riccardo Tesi – Acqua Foco E Vento (2003)
- Riccardo Tesi & Banditaliana – Thapsos (2004)
- Riccardo Tesi – Crinali (2006)
- Riccardo Tesi – Italie - Accordéon Diatonique (2007)
- Riccardo Tesi – Presente Remoto (2008)
- Riccardo Tesi & Claudio Carboni – L'Osteria del Fojonco (2009)
- Riccardo Tesi – Madreperla (2011)
- Riccardo Tesi – Cameristico (2012)
- Riccardo Tesi & Banditaliana – Maggio (2014)
- Riccardo Tesi & Banditaliana – Argento (2018)
- Riccardo Tesi - Elastic Trio - La giusta distanza (2023)

=== As contributor ===
- Beppe Gambetta (1995). Good News From Home. Green Linnet.
- Fabrizio De André (1996). Anime Salve. Ricordi.
- Ivano Fossati (1996). Macrame. Columbia Records.
- Ornella Vanoni (1997). Argilla. CGD.
- Arlo Bigazzi (1998). 2. Materiali.
- Ivano Fossati (1999). Canzoni a Raccolta. Sony International.
- Ivano Fossati (2000). La Disciplina della Terra. Columbia Records.
- Enzo Favata (2000). Isla. Robi Droli/Newtone.
- Maurizio Geri Swingtet (1997). Manouches E Dintorni. Robi Droli/Newtone.
- Elena Ledda (2001). Sonos. Robi Droli/Newtone.
- Elena Ledda (2004). Incanti. Felmay.
- Piero Pelu (2004). Soggetti Smarriti. WEA International.
- Uaragniaun (2006). U Diavule E l'Acqua Sante. Dunya.
- Peppino D'Agostino (2008). Made In Italy. Mesa Bluemoon.
