= Montagne verdi =

Single by Marcella Bella

from the album Tu non hai la più pallida idea dell'amore
- B-side: "Tu insieme a lei"
- Released: February 1972
- Label: CGD
- Songwriters: Gianni Bella; Giancarlo Bigazzi

Marcella Bella singles chronology
"Hai ragione tu" (1971)	"Montagne verdi" (1972)	"Sole che nasce, sole che muore" (1972)

Audio
- "Montagne verdi" on YouTube

"Montagne verdi" (transl. "Green Mountains") is a 1972 song composed by Gianni Bella (music) and Giancarlo Bigazzi (lyrics) and performed by Marcella Bella (at the time still using the mononym Marcella). It is considered Bella's signature song.

== Overview ==
The song premiered at the 22nd edition of the Sanremo Music Festival, where it ranked seventh. It eventually turned out to be a surprise hit and Bella's breakthrough. Singer-songwriter Eugenio Finardi served as a backing vocalist. It has been described as a song which "relies on well thought-out melodies and harmonic openings, making it a classic of pop music".

Artists who covered the song include Rita Pavone with a French-language version titled "Vertes collines", Ireen Sheer with a German-language version titled "Wer wird dich lieben", Graciela with a Spanish-language version titled "Montañas verdes", Elpida with a Greek-language version titled "S' éna kósmo gemáto agápi", and Claudio Simonetti with an English-language version titled "Let Me Help".

The song became a football chant of FC Bayern Munich fans, and in December 2024 it was recorded a version of the song with the title "Immer vorwärts FC Bayern" ('Always forward FC Bayern'), which on the occasion of the 125th anniversary of the team was adapted as the official anthem of the squad. The official recording featured operatic tenor Jonas Kaufmann and a chorus of 8,000 supporters.

== Track listing ==
- 7" single
1. "Montagne verdi" (Gianni Bella, Giancarlo Bigazzi)
2. "Tu insieme a lei" (Gianni Bella)

== Charts ==
Chart	Peak position
Italy (Musica e dischi)	3
