= Dedicato =

Single by Loredana Bertè

from the album Bandabertè
- B-side: "Amico giorno"
- Released: 1978
- Genre: R&B
- Label: CGD
- Songwriter: Ivano Fossati
- Producer: Mario Lavezzi

Loredana Bertè singles chronology
"Grida" (1977)	"Dedicato" (1978)	"E la luna bussò" (1979)

Audio
- "Dedicato" on YouTube

"Dedicato" ("Dedicated") is a song recorded by Italian singer Loredana Bertè. It was released in 1978 through Compagnia Generale del Disco and included on her fourth studio album Bandabertè.

The song marked the first Bertè's single entering the top ten on the Italian hit parade.

Written by Ivano Fossati, he initially recorded the song in his album La mia banda suona rock. Bertè and Fossati recorded a Spanish version of the song titled "Dedicado". Bertè also recorded an English version of the song titled "Dedicating". The song was adapted in French under the title "Dédié à toi" and performed by Dalida. In 2013, a new version was recorded by Gianna Nannini in her cover album Hitalia.

== Track listing ==
7" single – CGD 10117

1. "Dedicato" – 4:35 (Ivano Fossati)
2. "Amico giorno" – 3:27 (Mario Lavezzi, Oscar Avogadro, Daniele Pace)

== Charts ==
Chart	Peak position
Italy	7
