= Sandrelli =

Sandrelli is an Italian surname. Notable people with the surname include:

- Amanda Sandrelli (born 1964), Italian actress
- Patrizio Sandrelli (born 1950), Italian singer-songwriter
- Stefania Sandrelli (born 1946), Italian actress
