= L'Ultimo Pulcinella =

"L'Ultimo Pulcinella" is a 2008 film directed by Maurizio Scaparro and starring Massimo Ranieri. He plays Michaelangelo, an unemployed stage actor in Naples, Italy. In 2009 the film was awarded with the Italian version of a Golden Globe Award for "Best Original Score." That same year Massimo Ranieri won Best Actor at the Flaiano Intentional Prizes for his role in the film.

== Plot summary ==
Michaelangelo tries to make amends with his son, Francesco, who's still angry about his parents' divorce and feels that his father's acting career is more important to Michaelangelo than his own son. Francesco tells his father that he's going to go hang out with his friends, but he ends up getting involved in a Mafia killing, so he runs off to France. Michaelangelo becomes frantic and starts looking for his son. He visits his ex-wife, who tries to help him find Francesco. When he realizes Francesco's whereabouts, he goes to France and locates the boy. Unfortunately, it's not a happy reunion between father and son.. Michaelangelo loses his temper, slaps his son's face, and storms out. Francesco apologizes to his father, and the two continue roaming the French streets. Soon, they discover an old run-down theater, owned by an eccentrically faded French actress, Marie, played by Andrea Asti. Michaelangelo suggests that they start having performances in the theater. Marie accepts the offer on the condition that Michaelangelo teaches acting to a young group of street performers. He accepts the offer, and Francesco reluctantly agrees to join him. Michaelangelo visits the hangout of the French street performers, and forges a friendship with them, including an impromptu jam session. Unfortunately, the French police commissioner makes a couple of visits to the theater, first to interrogate Francesco about being in the country illegally as well as Marie, who claims she's a naturalized French citizen, and then end up taking a young Islamic man, Mohamed, into custody, claiming "it's a simple formaslity". But after roughing up the young man, he is released. But then, the second time, the whole swat team-like police force throws tear gas and starts shooting rubber bullets at Cecilia and her group. Michaelangelo starts to intervene when he witnesses the police start beating up a young unarmed male. The truly most touching scene of the film is when Francesco finally tells his father the truth about why he's wanted by the police and Michaelangelo and Francesco emotionally embrace each other.
