= Piazza Grande =

Piazza Grande may refer to:

- Piazza Grande (political movement), a movement within the Italian Democratic Party
- "Piazza Grande" (song), a 1972 song by Lucio Dalla
- Piazza Grande, a section of the Locarno Film Festival

== Squares ==
- Piazza Grande, a square in Arezzo, Italy
- Piazza Grande, a square in Livorno, Italy
- Piazza Grande, a square in Locarno, Switzerland
- Piazza Grande, a square in Modena, Italy
- Piazza Grande, a square in Montepulciano, Italy
- Piazza Grande, a square in Oderzo, Italy
- Piazza Grande, a square in Palmanova, Italy
- Piazza Grande, former name of Piazza Unità d'Italia in Trieste, Italy

== See also ==
- The Great Square of Pegasus, an asterism
