= Non si può morire dentro =

Single by Gianni Bella

from the album Sogni di un robot
- B-side: "T'amo"
- Released: June 1976
- Label: Tender/Derby
- Songwriters: Gianni Bella, Giancarlo Bigazzi

Gianni Bella singles chronology
"Oh mama" (1975)	"Non si può morire dentro" (1976)	"Io canto e tu" (1977)

Audio
- "Non si può morire dentro" on YouTube

"Non si può morire dentro" (transl. "One cannot die inside") is a 1976 song composed by Gianni Bella (music) and Giancarlo Bigazzi (lyrics) and performed by Gianni Bella.

The first song composed by Bella on the piano, unlike the previous ones composed on the guitar, the song eventually turned to be his major success as a singer. Characterised by the use of falsetto, it won the Festivalbar and topped the Italian hit parade for 10 weeks.

The single ultimately was the second best selling single of the year, behind Lucio Battisti's "Ancora tu". Bella also recorded a Spanish-language version of the song titled "De amor ya no se muere".

== Track listing ==
- 7" single
1. "Non si può morire dentro" (Gianni Bella, Giancarlo Bigazzi)
2. "T'amo" (Gianni Bella, Giancarlo Bigazzi)

== Charts ==
Chart (1976–77)	Peak position
Italy (Musica e dischi)	1
Spain (AFVYE)	2
