= E la luna bussò =

Single by Loredana Bertè

from the album Bandabertè
- B-side: "Folle città"
- Released: 1979
- Genre: Reggae
- Length: 4:35
- Label: CGD
- Songwriters: Mario Lavezzi; Oscar Avogadro; Daniele Pace
- Producer: Mario Lavezzi

Loredana Bertè singles chronology
"Dedicato" (1978)	"E la luna bussò" (1979)	"In alto mare" (1980)

Audio
- "E la luna bussò" on YouTube

"E la luna bussò" (also graphically rendered as "...e la luna bussò") is a song recorded by Italian singer Loredana Bertè. It was released in 1979 through Compagnia Generale del Disco and included on her fourth studio album Bandabertè.

Written by Oscar Avogadro, Daniele Pace and Mario Lavezzi, and produced by the latter, the song is considered one of Bertè's major hits, staying on the Italian Singles Chart for 29 weeks. It is regarded as the first reggae song produced in Italy.

Bertè also recorded a Spanish version of the song titled "Y la luna llamò". In 1997, the singer was featured in a new version of the song in duet with Francesca Alotta for her album Buonanotte alla luna.

== Track listing ==
7" single – CGD 10181

1. "E la luna bussò" (Mario Lavezzi, Oscar Avogadro, Daniele Pace)
2. "Folle città" (Oscar Avogadro, Alberto Radius)

== Charts ==
Chart	Peak position
Italy (Musica e dischi)	9
