= Un gatto nel blu =

Single by Roberto Carlos
- B-side: "Più grande del mio amor"
- Released: February 1972
- Label: CBS
- Songwriters: Totò Savio; Giancarlo Bigazzi

Roberto Carlos singles chronology
"Detalhes" (1971)	"Un gatto nel blu" (1972)	"Como vai você" (1972)

"Un gatto nel blu" (transl. "A Cat in the Blue [Sky]") is a 1972 song composed by Totò Savio and Giancarlo Bigazzi, and performed by Brazilian singer Roberto Carlos.

== Background ==
The song premiered at the 22nd edition of the Sanremo Music Festival, where it was eliminated. The song, however, proved successful in Spain and Latin America. Carlos also recorded the song in Spanish.

== Track listing ==
- 7" single
1. "Un gatto nel blu" (Totò Savio)
2. "Più grande del mio amor" (Daniele Pace, Renato Barros)

== Charts ==
Chart (1972–73)	Peak position
Argentina (CAPIF)	1
Brazil (IBOPE)	2
Italy (Musica e dischi)	50
Spain (AFYVE)	1
