= Maggie May (disambiguation) =

"Maggie May" is a song by Rod Stewart.

It may also refer to:

- "Maggie May" (folk song), a traditional Liverpudlian song performed by The Beatles, and released on the album Let It Be with the spelling "Maggie Mae"
  - Maggie May (musical), a musical inspired by the song
- Maggie May (model), Playboy's Miss August 2014
- "Maggie May (R.I.P. Faith)", a song by Hieroglyphics from the album Full Circle

== See also ==
- Maggie Mae (singer) (1960–2021), a German singer named after the folk song.
