= Vent'anni (Massimo Ranieri song) =

Single by Massimo Ranieri

from the album Vent'anni...
- B-side: "Io non avrò"
- Released: 1970
- Genre: Pop
- Label: CGD
- Songwriter(s): Giancarlo Bigazzi, Enrico Polito, Totò Savio

Massimo Ranieri singles chronology
"Sogno d'amore" (1970)	"Vent'anni" (1970)	"L'amore è un attimo" (1971)

"Vent'anni" (transl. "Twenty years old") is a 1970 Italian song composed by Giancarlo Bigazzi, Enrico Polito and Totò Savio and performed by Massimo Ranieri. The song won the eighth edition of Canzonissima, beating Gianni Morandi's "Capriccio" and establishing Ranieri as the new favorite of the Italian younger audience.

The song also got an immediate commercial success, with the single ranking #1 on the Italian hit parade.

== Track listing ==
- 7" single – N 9823
1. "Vent'anni" (Giancarlo Bigazzi, Enrico Polito, Totò Savio)
2. "Io non avrò" (Giancarlo Bigazzi, Enrico Polito, Totò Savio)

== Charts ==
Chart	Peak position
Italy	1

== Sales ==
Sales for Vent'anni
Region	Sales
Italy	350,000
