= Resta cu' mme =

- Sheet music cover

Song
- Released: 1957
- Genre: Canzone napoletana; biguine
- Songwriters: Domenico Modugno; Dino Verde

Audio
- "Resta cu' mme" on YouTube

"Resta cu' mme" ("Stay with Me") is a 1957 canzone napoletana song composed by Domenico Modugno (music) and Dino Verde (lyrics). The autobiographical lyrics portray a troubled love story, inspired by the one that Verde was experiencing at the time.

The song was launched by Marino Marini at the Capriccio nightclub in Milan, and after the first performance the very excited response by the audience prompted Marini to re-perform the song ten more times. The verse "Nun me 'mporta dô passato, nun me 'mporta 'e chi t'ha avuto" (i.e. "I don't care about the past, I don't care who had you") was initially censored and replaced by "Nun me 'mporta si 'o passato sulo lagreme m'ha dato" ("I don't care if the past only gave me tears").

It first entered the hitparade in the version recorded by Roberto Murolo. The most successful cover version was the disco rendition by Marcella Bella, which in 1976 reached ninth place on the hit parade. Artists who covered the song also include the author Modugno, Mina, Ornella Vanoni, Claudio Villa, Bruno Martino, Ruggero Raimondi, Nicola Arigliano, Betty Curtis, Peter Van Wood, Fred Bongusto, Lina Sastri, Giacomo Rondinella, Renzo Arbore, Rino Salviati, Maurizio Arena.

The song was adapted in numerous foreign languages, including English (with the titles "Stay Here with Me" and "Stay with Me", with lyrics by Milt Gabler), French (as "C'est plus facile à deux" and "C'est du soleil de t'embrasser") and Spanish (as "Ven junto a mi"). Non-Italian language versions include those recorded by Kaye Ballard, Colette Renard, Georgia Gibbs, Bertil Boo, Gogi Grant.
