= Squallor =

Italian comedy music group

Squallor (also spelled as Gli Squallor) were an Italian comedy music group, active between 1973 and 1994.

== Career ==
The group formed in 1973 as a ribald side project of four established musicians: composer and producer Giancarlo Bigazzi, producer Alfredo Cerruti, lyricist Daniele Pace and songwriter Totò Savio. Producer Elio Gariboldi left the band after the first album in 1973. Characterized by adult themes, references to sex, political incorrectness, and vulgarity, in spite of no live activity and radio ostracism, they got an immediate commercial success. In 1984 they wrote and starred in the low budget comedy Arrapaho, loosely inspired by their album with the same name, which was a surprise hit at the box office and achieved some cult status. The group disbanded in 1994, following their last album Cambiamento. 2012 saw the release of Gli Squallor, a documentary about the group.

The Squallor reached the crest of their popularity at the end of the 1980s. Federation of the Greens, Gianni De Michelis (in the song Demiculis) and Umberto Bossi (in Berta II) were some of their political and satyrical targets.

== Discography ==
Albums

- 1973 – Troia
- 1974 – Palle
- 1977 – Vacca
- 1977 – Pompa
- 1978 – Cappelle
- 1980 – Tromba
- 1981 – Mutando
- 1982 – Scoraggiando
- 1983 – Arrapaho
- 1984 – Uccelli d'Italia
- 1985 – Tocca l'albicocca
- 1986 – Manzo
- 1988 – Cielo duro
- 1994 – Cambiamento
