= Opera (band) =

- Origin: Messina, Italy
- Genres: Pop-rock
- Years active: 1975–1985
- Labels: CBS; EMI; Durium; Radio Records

Opera, also spelled as Gli Opera, was an Italian pop-rock band, active between 1975 and 1985.

== Career ==
The group formed on the initiative of the singer Filiberto Ricciardi, following the dissolution of his previous group, Gens. They debuted in the 1975 edition of Festivalbar with the song "Donna di chi", which briefly entered the Italian hit parade.

The band was entered into the main competition at the 26th edition of the Sanremo Music Festival, going to the finals and eventually ranking ninth with the song "L'ho persa ancora". The competed in the festival two more times, in 1979 and in 1981, with the songs "Il diario dei segreti" and "Guerriero".

The band was also active on stage, with the musical Aria, acqua, terra e fuoco, where they performed songs from every era, including classical music, in a rock arrangement.

== Discography ==
Album

- 1981 – Le nostre canzoni (CBS)

Singles

- 1975 – "Donna di chi" (CBS, 3260)
- 1976 – "L'ho persa ancora" (CBS, 4042 / Peters International, PI 434)
- 1976 – "Lei bambina lei signora" (EMI, 3C 006-18209)
- 1977 – "Stelle su di noi" (Durium, LdAI 7980)
- 1978 – "Re Salomone" (Durium, LdAI 8001)
- 1979 – "Volare mai" (Durium, LdAI 8085)
- 1979 – "Il diario dei segreti" (Durium, LdAI 8038)
- 1980 – "Lascia che sia" (Durium, LdAI 8078)
- 1981 – "Guerriero" (Radio Records, 7210)
- 1981 – "Guai" (Radio Records, 7233)
