= Ivano Fossati =

Italian pop singer from Genoa

Ivano Alberto Fossati
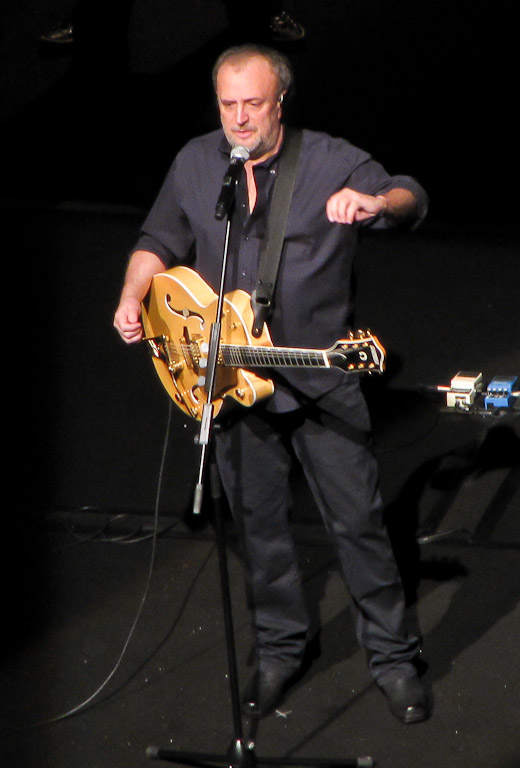
- Fossati at Teatro degli Arcimboldi, Milan, Italy, 2010

Background information
- Born: 21 September 1951 (age 74); Genoa, Italy
- Genres: Rock; Italian progressive rock; pop
- Occupation: Singer-songwriter
- Years active: 1971–2012
- Labels: Fonit Cetra; RCA Italiana; CBS; Capitol
- Website: Official website Archived 2025-12-12 at the Wayback Machine

Ivano Alberto Fossati (born 21 September 1951) is an Italian pop singer from Genoa. He was a member of the progressive rock group Delirium and has worked with Fabrizio De André, Riccardo Tesi, Anna Oxa, Mia Martini, Ornella Vanoni, Shirley Bassey, Francesco De Gregori, Menudo and Mina.

In 1972, he exhibited at the Sanremo Music Festival with the song "Jesahel" in a collective band named Delirium. After the new single "Haum" that Delirium presented at Un disco per l'estate Fossati left the group to start a solo career.

The debut album (45s) is named Beati i ricchi, part of the soundtrack of the movie having the same name.

In those years, Fossati wrote a number of successful songs sung by other singers, as Un'emozione da poco (for Anna Oxa), Dedicato (for Loredana Bertè), Non può morire un'idea (for Mina) and Mi vuoi (for Marcella Bella). An extremely successful song was Pensiero stupendo, sung by Patty Pravo.

In 1982 he wrote the successful song Non sono una signora for Loredana Bertè.

In 1996 Fossati co-wrote the songs of the album Anime Salve of the prominent Italian singer-songwriter Fabrizio De André. He also sings in some of the album's songs. The same year he released his album Macramé. Both albums received the "Targa Tenco" under "Best album" category.

In October 2011, after the release of the album Decadancing, Fossati announced during Fabio Fazio's TV show Che tempo che fa that he decided to end his music career: "I've been thinking a lot about it, not in the last days, but during last two or three years. This will be my last album, and I won't record any new album. And my next tour will be the last one." Fossati's last concert was held at the Teatro Piccolo in Milan, on 19 March 2012.

On 25 November 2023, Ivano Fosssati and other author of "Jesahel" (Oscar Prudente) together with Universal Music Group sue Public Enemy for plagiarism, since Fossati and Prudente are not recognized as co-authors of "Harder Than You Think".

== Discography ==
- Il grande mare che avremmo traversato (1973)
- Poco prima dell'aurora (with Oscar Prudente; 1974)
- Good-bye Indiana (1975)
- La casa del serpente (1977)
- La mia banda suona il rock (1979)
- Panama e dintorni (1981)
- Le città di frontiera (1983)
- Ventilazione (1984)
- 700 giorni (1986)
- La pianta del te (1988)
- Discanto (1990)
- Lindbergh (1992)
- Buontempo dal vivo Vol. 1 (1993)
- Carte da decifrare dal Vivo Vol. 2 (1993)
- Macramé (1996)
- Canzoni a raccolta – Time and Silence (1998)
- La disciplina della Terra (2000)
- Not One Word (2001)
- Lampo viaggiatore (2003)
- Dal vivo, Vol. 3: Tour Acustico (2004)
- L'arcangelo (2006)
- Ho sognato una strada (2006)
- Musica moderna (2008)
- Decadancing (2011)
- Mina Fossati (2019)

=== As contributor ===
- Scacchi e tarocchi (by Francesco De Gregori, 1985)
- Euphonia (by Vincenzo Zitello, 1986)
- Anime salve (by Fabrizio De André, 1996)
- Les Annees Orlando l'Integrale 1970–1997 (by Dalida, 1997)
- Veleno (by Mina, 2003)
- Acqua foco e vento (by Riccardo Tesi, 2003)
- Miei compagni di viaggio (by Mia Martini, 2003)
- Troppo tempo/Hace tiempo (by Laura Pausini, 2011)
