= Franca Sebastiani =

- Birth name: Franca Sebastiani
- Born: 25 January 1949; San Casciano dei Bagni, Italy
- Died: 27 May 2015 (aged 66); Rome, Italy
- Genres: Pop
- Instrument: Vocals
- Years active: 1965–2015

Franca Sebastiani, known early in her career under the pseudonym Franchina (San Casciano dei Bagni, 25 January 1949 – Rome, 27 May 2015), was an Italian singer.

Her daughter Cristiana was born in 1971 from her relationship with Massimo Ranieri.
