= Delirium (band) =

Italian progressive rock band

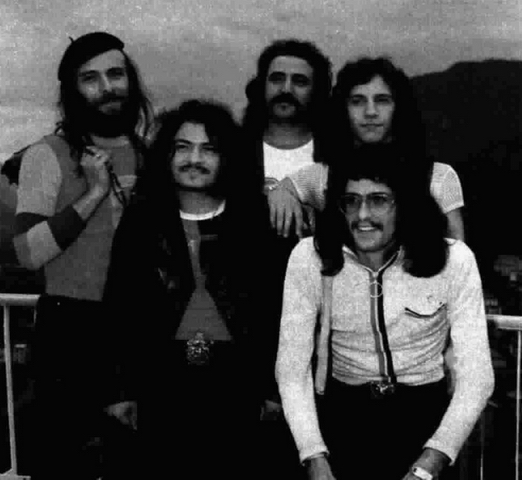
- Delirium at Un disco per l'estate in 1972

Background information
- Origin: Genoa, Italy
- Genres: Progressive rock
- Years active: 1969–1970s 2000s–present
- Labels: Fonit Cetra; Zafiro; BASF
- Spinoff of: Sagittari
- Members: Alessandro Corvaglia; Ettore Vigo; Michele Cusato; Fabio Chighini; Enrico Tixi; Martin Frederick Grice
- Past members: Ivano Fossati; Peppino Di Santo; Marcello Reale; Mimmo Di Martino; Rino Dimopoli; Roberto Solinas; Alfredo Vandresi; Mauro La Luce

Delirium is an Italian progressive rock musical group, best known for their 1972 song "Jesahel".

== History ==
The group formed in 1969, with the name Sagittari and with a beat repertoire. The group changed its name after Ivano Fossati joined and replaced the Sagittari singer Riccardo Anselmi towards the end of 1970.

Since their first single "Canto di Osanna" (1971), presented at the Festival di Musica d'Avanguardia e di Nuove Tendenze, the group gained an immediate success. In 1972 Delirium entered the Sanremo Music Festival with the song "Jesahel", reaching sixth place in the competition and peaking number one on the Italian hit parade. After the new single "Haum" that Delirium presented at Un disco per l'estate Fossati left the group to start a solo career. After two more albums the group disbanded in mid-1970s, until a reunion in early 2000s.

== Discography ==
=== Albums ===
- 1971 – it:Dolce acqua (Fonit Cetra LPX 11)
- 1972 – it:Lo scemo e il villaggio (Fonit Cetra LPX 18)
- 1974 – it:Delirium III - Viaggio negli arcipelaghi del tempo (Fonit Cetra LPX 29)
- 2009 – Il nome del vento (Black Widow Records, BWR 113, LP/CD)
- 2015 – L'era della menzogna (Black Widow Records, BWRCD 180-2 LP/CD)

=== Singles ===
- 1971 – it:Canto di Osanna/Deliriana (Fonit Cetra SPF 31284)
- 1972 – it:Jesahel/King's Road (Fonit Cetra SPF 31293)
- 1972 – it:Haum!/Movimento II: Dubbio (Fonit Cetra SPF 31295)
- 1972 – it:Dolce acqua/Favola o storia del lago di Kriss (Fonit Cetra SPF 31297)
- 1972 – it:Treno/È l'ora (Fonit Cetra SPF 31300)
- 1974 – Leôa de laôa/ Pane vero vino puro (Aguamanda AG 9002)
- 1975 – Jill/ Live Love And Be Free (Aguamanda AG 9007)
- 1975 – Cowboy/ Corri bambino (Fonit Cetra SPB 36)
- 1975 – Signore/ Buana, The Rainbow (Fonit Cetra SPF 31313)
