= Tu (Umberto Tozzi song) =

Single by Umberto Tozzi

from the album Tu
- B-side: "Perdendo Anna"
- Released: 31 March 1978
- Label: CGD; CBS
- Songwriter(s): Umberto Tozzi; Giancarlo Bigazzi

Music video
- "Tu" (audio) on YouTube

"Tu" is a song written by Umberto Tozzi and Giancarlo Bigazzi and recorded by Tozzi in 1978. Along with "Ti amo" and "Gloria", it is his most successful and well-known song.

== Charts ==
Chart (1978–79)	Peak position
Austria (Ö3 Austria Top 40)	5
Italy (Musica e dischi)	1
Spain (AFE)	1
Switzerland (Schweizer Hitparade)	1
West Germany (GfK)	17

== Year-End chart ==
Chart (1978)	Peak position
Swiss Singles Chart	3
Italian Singles Chart	4
Austrian Top 40	16
German Media Control Charts	92

== Sales ==
Chart (1978)	Peak position
France	497,000
