= Oscar Prudente =

Italian composer

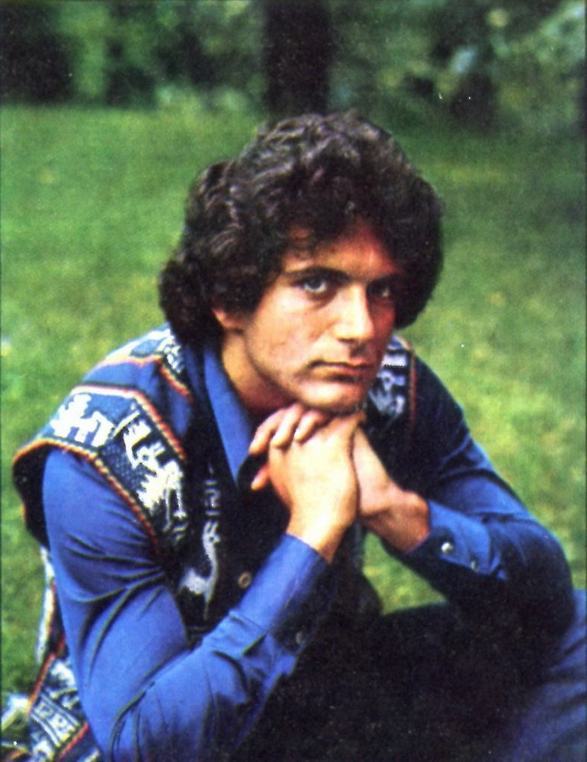
- Born: 9 January 1944 (age 82); Rossiglione, Genoa, Italy
- Occupations: Singer-songwriter, composer

Oscar Prudente (born 9 January 1944) is an Italian pop-rock singer-songwriter, arranger, musician and composer.

== Career ==
Born in Rossiglione, Genoa, at young age Prudente studied drums, piano and guitar. At fifteen, while attending the high school, he was chosen by Colin Hicks as the drummer for his European tour. Back in Italy, he became the drummer of Luigi Tenco for his live performances; noticed by the record producer Nanni Ricordi, he released several singles in the sixties, entering the competition at several music festivals including Cantagiro and Un disco per l'estate.

The turning point of his career was the encounter with Ivano Fossati, with whom he composed several hits of the progressive rock group Delirium and with whom, after that Fossati left the group, he released the album Poco prima dell'aurora. Fossati and Prudente also composed songs for several other artists, including the hit "Pensiero stupendo" for Patty Pravo, that peaked at first place on the Italian hit parade.

On November 25, 2023, Prudente and Ivano Fossati, together with Universal Music Group, sued Public Enemy for plagiarism of their song "Jesahel", since Fossati and Prudente are not recognized as co-authors of "Harder Than You Think".
