= Gianni Nazzaro =

Italian singer (1948–2021)

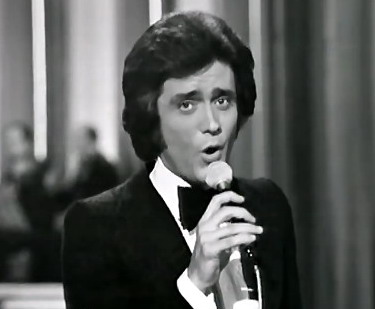
- Nazzaro in 1971

Background information
- Also known as: Buddy
- Born: Giovanni Nazzaro; 27 October 1948; Naples, Italy
- Died: 27 July 2021 (aged 72) Rome, Italy
- Genres: Pop; canzone napoletana
- Occupations: Singer; actor
- Years active: 1965–2018
- Spouse: Nada Ovcina (m. 1973, divorced) (m. 2021)

Giovanni "Gianni" Nazzaro (Italian pronunciation: [ˈdʒanni nadˈdzaːro]; 27 October 1948 – 27 July 2021) was an Italian singer and actor.

== Early life and career ==
Nazzaro was born in Naples, the second of four children (two males and two females) born to vaudeville actor and gossip columnist Erminio Nazzaro. He started his career with the stage name of Buddy, recording 59 singles, mainly cover songs, between 1965 and 1968. In 1968, Nazzaro started to perform with his real name and he took part at the music contest Un disco per l'estate with the song "Solo noi". In 1970, he won the Festival di Napoli with the song "Me chiamme ammore". After a series of successful hits, in the 1980s Nazzaro gradually slowed his musical production, focusing with some success in stage musicals.

== Personal life and death ==
In the early 1970s, Nazzaro married Nada Ovcina. They had two children, Junior (born 1973) and Giorgia (born 1976). Nazzaro and Ovcina eventually divorced, but after years of estrangement, they reestablished their relationship in 2016. Ovcina remarried Nazzaro just hours before his death in a Roman hospital from lung cancer, on 27 July 2021.

== Discography ==
=== Selected singles ===
- 1968: "Solo noi"
- 1968: "In fondo ai sogni miei"
- 1969: "Incontri d'estate"
- 1970: "L'amore è una colomba"
- 1970: "Me chiamme ammore"
- 1971: "Bianchi cristalli sereni"
- 1971: "Far l'amore con te"
- 1972: "Non voglio innamorarmi mai"
- 1972: "Quanto è bella lei"
- 1972: "La nostra canzone"
- 1973: "Il primo sogno proibito"
- 1974: "A modo mio"
- 1974: "Questo sì che è amore"
- 1974: "Piccola mia piccola"
- 1976: "Me ne vado"
- 1977: "Mi sta scoppiando il cuore"
- 1980: "Uomo di strada"
- 1981: "Sì"
- 1983: "Mi sono innamorato di mia moglie"
- 1985: "Noi due soli"

=== Studio albums ===
- 1971: Gianni Nazzaro (CGD, FGL 5088)
- 1972: Gianni Nazzaro (Fans, GPX 7)
- 1973: C'è un momento del giorno (in cui penso a te) (CGD, 65412)
- 1974: Questo sì che è amore (CGD, 69080)
- 1975: C'era una volta il night (CGD, 69157)
- 1976: Le due facce di Gianni Nazzaro (CGD, 81990)
