= Totò Savio =

Italian composer (1937–2004))

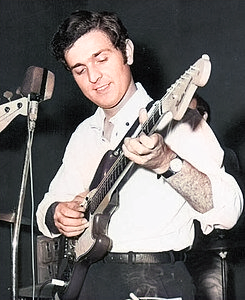

Background information
- Born: 18 November 1937; Naples, Campania, Kingdom of Italy
- Died: 25 July 2004 (aged 66) Rome, Lazio, Italy
- Occupations: Composer; lyricist
- Formerly of: Squallor

Gaetano "Totò" Savio (18 November 1937 – 25 July 2004) was an Italian composer, lyricist, producer, guitarist and occasional singer.

== Early life ==
Born in Naples, Savio started playing the guitar at six years old, and at 13 he won a radio contest for guitarists. In 1955 he became a member of the musical group of Marino Marini, with whom he toured in Europe and Africa. He formed his own band in 1961, and the two of them toured throughout Italy and appeared on a number of radio and television shows.

== Career ==
In the second half of the 1960s Savio started composing songs, getting his first hit in 1967, Little Tony's "Cuore matto". In 1973 he co-founded the comedy group Squallor, serving as composer and also occasionally performing as a singer. Other hits written by Savio include Renato dei Profeti's "Lady Barbara", Massimo Ranieri's "Vent'anni" and "Erba di casa mia" (winning songs of the 1970 and 1972 editions of Canzonissima), Loretta Goggi's "Maledetta primavera", Michele Zarrillo's "Una rosa blu", I Camaleonti's "Perché ti amo" (winning song of the 1973 Un disco per l'estate), Il Giardino dei Semplici's "Miele", and Roberto Carlos' "Un gatto nel blu".
