= Piazza Grande (song) =

Single by Lucio Dalla
- B-side: "Convento di pianura"
- Released: 1972
- Label: RCA Italiana

Lucio Dalla singles chronology
"Il colonnello" (1971)	"Piazza Grande" (1972)	"Sulla rotta di Cristoforo Colombo" (1972)

Audio
- "Piazza Grande" on YouTube

"Piazza Grande" ('Grand Square') is a 1972 song composed by Lucio Dalla, Ron, Gianfranco Baldazzi and Sergio Bardotti, arranged by Ruggero Cini and performed by Lucio Dalla. The song ranked eighth at the 22nd edition of the Sanremo Music Festival.

== Overview ==
The song was composed by Dalla and Ron with the working title "America", and it was initially supposed to tell the story of the 1620 Mayflower voyage. After various attempts of lyricists Bardotti and Baldazzi to suit the projected theme to the music, during a promotional tour in the US, in Manhattan, Baldazzi eventually changed the topic of the song into the story of a homeless man who prefers his freedom to comfort.

The title of the song is a reference to Piazza Cavour in Bologna, close to Dalla's birth house. The RCA label lobbied to change it into a more well known "Canal Grande", with Dalla resisting to its requests. Once he heard the song, his RCA colleague Gianni Morandi repeatedly asked Dalla to be the one to bring the song to the Sanremo Festival, eventually being turned down.

The song premiered at the Sanremo Music Festival 1972, with Dalla being accompanied by Ron as guitarist. In spite of being one of the favorites it only ranked eighth, even if it turned to be a commercial success and a long seller.

Artists who recorded cover versions of the song include Fiorella Mannoia, Gianni Morandi, Albano Carrisi, Tosca & Sílvia Pérez Cruz, Fiorello, Tomislav Ivčić, Franck Pourcel, Pierdavide Carone.

== Track listing ==
No.	Title	Writer(s)	Length
1.	"Piazza Grande"	Gianfranco Baldazzi, Sergio Bardotti, Lucio Dalla, Ron	3:14
2.	"Convento di pianura"	Paola Pallottino, Lucio Dalla	3:52

== Charts ==
Chart (1972)	Peak position
Italy (Musica e dischi)	10

Chart (2012)	Peak position
Italy (FIMI)	7

== Certifications ==
Region	Certification	Certified units/sales
Italy (FIMI) sales from 2009	2× Platinum	200,000^{‡}
^{‡} Sales+streaming figures based on certification alone.
