= Oscar Avogadro =

Italian lyricist

- Born: 9 August 1951; Turin, Italy
- Died: 30 September 2010 (aged 59); Milan, Italy
- Occupation: lyricist

Oscar Avogadro (9 August 1951 – 30 September 2010) was an Italian lyricist.

Born in Turin, Avogadro debuted in the late 1960s as the vocalist of the short-lived vocal group Protagonisti. After the group disbanded, he started a career as a lyricist, getting his first hits in collaboration with Sandro Giacobbe in the early 1970s. He was a usual collaborator of Mario Lavezzi and Oscar Prudente. In 1983 his song "Margherita non lo sa" ranked third at the 33rd edition of the Sanremo Music Festival.
