= Sandro Giacobbe =

Italian singer-songwriter (1949–2025)

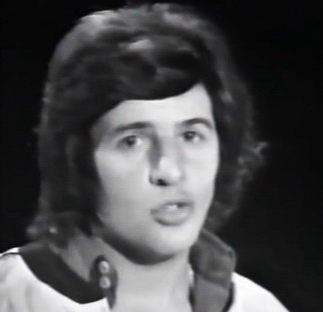
- Giacobbe in Adesso musica (1974)
- Born: 14 December 1949; Genoa, Italy
- Died: 5 December 2025 (aged 75); Cogorno, Italy
- Occupation: Singer-songwriter

Sandro Giacobbe (14 December 1949 – 5 December 2025) was an Italian singer-songwriter.

== Life and career ==
Born in Genova on 14 December 1949, Giacobbe started his career in the early 1970s and got his first success in 1974, with the song "Signora mia", which entered the top-ten on the Italian hit parade. For about a decade, he got several major hits, usually consisting of romantic ballads characterized by intimate and sometimes malicious tones. His song ""El Jardín Prohibido", the Spanish-language version of "Il giardino proibito", peaked on first place at the Spanish hit parade in 1976. The same year, he entered the main competition at the Sanremo Music Festival, ranking third with the song "Gli occhi di tua madre"; the song reached the second place on the Italian hit parade. His last major hit was the 1982 song "Sarà la nostalgia". From the mid-1980s, he mainly devoted his career to live concerts and to initiatives of solidarity. In 2003, he ranked second at the Viña del Mar International Song Festival.

Giacobbe died of prostate cancer on 5 December 2025, at the age of 75. The disease had left him requiring use of a wheelchair.

== Discography ==
Albums

- 1974: Signora mia
- 1975: Il giardino proibito
- 1976: Metto all'asta...
- 1977: Bimba
- 1978: Lenti a contatto
- 1979: Mi va che ci sei
- 1980: Notte senza di te
- 1990: Io vorrei
- 1991: Sulla mia stessa strada
- 1992: Le donne
- 1994: E venti....
- 1998: Il meglio
- 2007: Vuoi ballare
- 2008: Trentacinque
- 2013: Insieme noi
- 2015: Ali per volare
- 2019: Solo un bacio
- 2024: Signora mia sapessi...50 volte ti ho sognata
