= Patrizio Sandrelli =

Italian singer-songwriter

- Born: 17 March 1950 (age 76); Rome, Italy
- Occupation: Singer-songwriter
- Years active: 1970–1978

Patrizio Sandrelli (born 17 March 1950) is an Italian former singer-songwriter, active in the 1970s.

== Life and career ==
Born in Rome, Sandrelli started his career in the early 1970s, performing in the clubs of his hometown. After getting a contract with the label Smash, his career was launched in 1975 by the single "Rosa", which was a surprise hit peaking at the seventh place on the Italian hit parade. The same year he got another hit with "Fratello in amore", a song dedicated to his friend Alessandro Momo, deceased that year in a motorcycle accident. The song entered the top ten on the Italian hit parade, while an English-language version, "Brother in Love", performed by the same Sandrelli, was released one year later and reached the 21st place.

In 1976 Sandrelli entered the competition at the 26th edition of the Sanremo Music Festival with the song "Piccola donna addio". In 1978, after the minor hit "Lisa", he left the showbusiness.
