= John Kirkpatrick =

John Kirkpatrick may refer to:

- John Kirkpatrick (antiquary) (c. 1686–1728), British antiquarian
- John Kirkpatrick (politician) (1840–1904), Australian politician
- John Simpson Kirkpatrick (1892–1915), British-born Australian soldier
- John Kirkpatrick (pianist) (1905–1991), American classical pianist and music scholar
- John Kirkpatrick (folk musician) (born 1947), English player of free reed instruments
- John Kirkpatrick (rugby league) (born 1979), English rugby league footballer of the 2000s
- John Lycan Kirkpatrick (1813–1885), president of Davidson College
- John Bayard Kirkpatrick, mayor of New Brunswick, New Jersey
