= Massimo Ranieri =

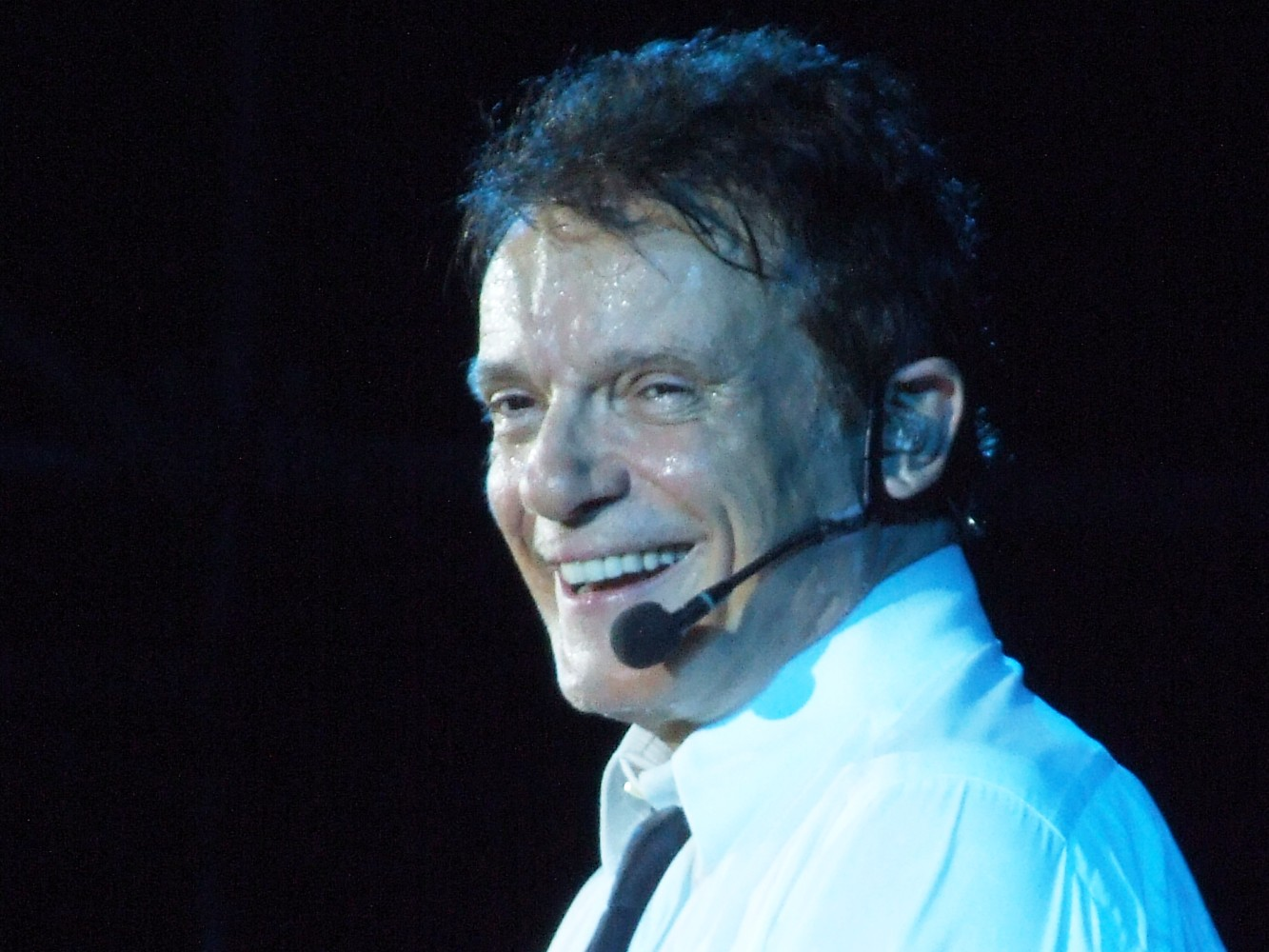
- Ranieri in 2009

Background information
- Born: Giovanni Calone; 3 May 1951 (age 75); Naples, Italy
- Genres: Traditional pop
- Occupations: Singer; television presenter; actor; director
- Instruments: Vocals; keyboards; guitar
- Years active: 1964–present

Giovanni Calone (born 3 May 1951), known professionally as Massimo Ranieri, is an Italian singer, actor, television presenter and theatre director.

== Biography ==
=== Early life ===
Ranieri was born in Borgo Santa Lucia, Naples, the fifth of eight children in the family. When he was 10, young Giovanni would sing at restaurants, wedding receptions, etc. He was discovered by a music producer about four years later and was flown to New York to record an EP under the name of Gianni Rock.

=== Singing career ===
Calone recorded four songs in 1964: "Tanti auguri signora", "Se mi aspetti stasera", "Non chiudere la porta", and "La prima volta". None of the records were successful, primarily because his young voice was changing. Two years later, he would re-emerge under his new stage name, Massimo Ranieri. In 1966, he made his TV debut singing "Bene Mio". A year later, he made another TV appearance singing "Pietà per chi ti ama". In 1968, he recorded two more songs: "Da bambino", "Ma l'amore cos'è" and "Preghiera".

It was not until 1969 that he achieved success and became a teen idol when he sang "'O sole mio" on live TV. That same year, he had a string of hits: "Rita", "Se bruciasse la città", "Quando l'amore diventa poesia", "Il mio amore resta sempre", "Rose rosse" and "Zingara". In 1970, "Vent'anni", "Sogno d'amore", "Sei l'amore mio", "Aranjuez Amore Mio", and "Candida".

In 1971, Ranieri recorded the songs "Adagio Veneziano", "Via del Conservatorio", and "Io e Te". He represented Italy in the Eurovision Song Contest 1971 where he placed 5th with the song "L'amore è un attimo". In 1972, he released the songs "Ti ruberei", "'O surdato 'nnammurato", and "Erba di casa mia"; in 1973, "Amo ancora lei". He returned to the Eurovision Song Contest 1973, to represent Italy with "Chi sarà con te", where he placed 13th. In 1974, came the singles "Te voglio bene assaie", "Immagina", and "Per una donna".

In 1988, he made a comeback to his singing career with the song "Perdere l'amore", which won the Sanremo Music Festival 1988, that year. In 1997, he made another comeback with "Ti parlerò d'amore".

In February 2007, he started a concert tour of Italy, titled "Canto perché non-so nuotare...da 40 anni", which lasted for more than two years, with more than 500 shows, was made into a CD and a DVD, which went platinum.

In 2022, he won the Mia Martini critics' award at Sanremo Music Festival 2022. In December 2024, he was announced as one of the participants in the Sanremo Music Festival 2025. He placed 23rd with the song "Tra le mani un cuore".

=== Acting career ===
In 1970, Ranieri decided to venture into acting. His screen debut, Metello, received rave reviews from critics and won him the David DiDonatello award for best actor for portraying the title character. He co-starred with Anna Magnani in the television film La Sciantosa later that year.

In 1974, he filmed Salvo D'Acquisto, where he portrayed a carabiniere who was executed by the Nazis during World War II.

When his singing career started to decline in 1975, Massimo concentrated on his acting career, both in the cinema and, most importantly, as a stage actor: he collaborated with the directors Mauro Bolognini, Giuseppe Patroni Griffi, Giorgio de Lullo, Giorgio Strehler and Maurizio Scaparro, performing a wide range of material from modern plays and musicals, to Molière and Shakespeare.

In 1996, Ranieri provided the speaking and the singing voice of Quasimodo in the Italian-Language version of Disney's The Hunchback of Notre Dame. He even reprised this role in the sequel.

In 2004, he starred in his first French film, a trilogy series called Les Parisiens, where he played a street artist. In 2005, he returned to the stage with the show "Accussì Grande", after a long bout with illness, from which he fully recovered. In 2007, he was in a docu-film called Civico 0, where he played Guilano, a fruit vendor, who becomes homeless after the death of his mother. In 2008, he starred in the film L'Ultimo Pulcinella.

In 2009, he played the storyteller in the play Polvere di Baghdad, directed by Maurizio Scaparro.

In February 2009, after twelve years, he returned to the Sanremo Festival for a duet with Neapolitan singer Barbara Gilbo, a participant in the ‘Proposte’ section with the song ‘Che ne sai di me’ by Giancarlo Bigazzi and Sirio Martelli.

In 2010, Massimo was featured in Passione, a documentary about the history of music from Naples, Italy, directed by Italian-American actor John Turturro. In November 2010, he took part in the miniseries remake of the classic play, Filumena Marturano, produced by Italian TV RAI Uno, with Mariangela Melato in the title role. Massimo portrayed Filumena's husband, Domenico Soriano.

=== Other ventures ===
On 16 October 2002, Massimo Ranieri was nominated Goodwill Ambassador of the Food and Agriculture Organization of the United Nations (FAO).

=== Personal life ===
Ranieri never married. However, in 1971, he fathered a daughter, Cristiana, out of wedlock with Franca Sebastiani. He did not have anything to do with the raising of his daughter, saying that he was too young and inexperienced for fatherhood, and that it would be damaging to his career. He was never linked with any other woman thereafter. He did not have any contact with his daughter until they met when she was about 20 years old.

At the start of 2007, he decided to publicly acknowledge his long-estranged daughter, and embraced her for the first time on live TV. It was a tearful reunion between father and daughter.

He also became a grandfather in July 2011.

== Discography ==
1964

- USA tour with Sergio Bruni
- SINGLE: Lassù qualcuno mi ama/Un ragazzo come me (as Gianni Rock)
- SINGLE: Preghiera/Una bocca, due occhi e un nome (as Gianni Rock)
- SINGLE: Se mi aspetti stasera/La prima volta (as Gianni Rock)
- SINGLE: Tanti auguri señora/Non chiudere la porta (as Gianni Rock)

1966

- Scala Reale (later called Canzonissima). He sings "L'amore è una cosa meravigliosa" under the art name Ranieri.
- SINGLE: L'amore è una cosa meravigliosa/Bene mio (as Ranieri)

1967

- He wins the Cantagiro competition of young promises with "Pietà per chi ti ama".
- SINGLE: Pietà per chi ti ama/No, mamma (as Ranieri)

1968

- He participated in the Sanremo song competition with I Giganti with the song "Da bambino"
- Cantagiro with the song "Preghiera per lei".
- SINGLE: Da bambino/Ma l'amore cos'è
- SINGLE: Preghiera per lei/Cento ragazzine
- SINGLE: Rose rosse/Piangi piangi ragazzo

1969

- Sanremo with "Quando l'amore diventa poesia" a duet with Orietta Berti
- Cantagiro where he won first prize with "Rose rosse"
- Canzonissima, 2nd place with "Se bruciasse la città"
- SINGLE: Quando l'amore diventa poesia/Cielo blu
- SINGLE: Il mio amore resta sempre Teresa/Rose rosse )
- SINGLE: Se bruciasse la città/Rita
- SINGLE: 'O sole mio/Ma l'amore cos'è
- First LP titled "Massimo Ranieri".
- Records "Io e te" by Ennio Morricone, the title song from the film 'Metello'.

1970

- Canzonissima, 1st prize with ‘Vent'anni'
- Release of his 2nd LP, titled "Vent'anni".
- SINGLE: Sei l'amore mio/Fai di me quello che vuoi
- SINGLE: Le braccia dell'amore/Candida
- SINGLE: Sogno d'amore/Mio caro amore evanescente e puro
- SINGLE: Vent'anni/Io non avrò

1971

- SINGLE: L'amore è un attimo/A Lucia
- SINGLE: Io e te/Adagio veneziano
- SINGLE: Via del Conservatorio/Momento

1972

- 'O surdato nammurato' show recorded live (and filmed by RAI TV), at the Sistina Theatre, Rome, directed by Vittorio De Sica.
- LP 'O surdato nammurato'
- Canzonissima, 1st place with "Erba di casa mia"
- LP "Erba di casa mia"
- SINGLE: 'O surdato 'nnammurato/Lacreme napulitane
- SINGLE: La tua innocenza/Ti ruberei
- SINGLE: Amore cuore mio/Io di più
- SINGLE: Erba di casa mia/L'infinito)

1973

- Participates again in Eurofestival with "Chi sarà".
- LP "Album di famiglia".
- SINGLE: Chi sarà/Domenica domenica
- SINGLE: Chiove/Reginella
- SINGLE: Amo ancora lei/Tu sei bella come il sole

1974

- "Napulammore", theatrical musical show directed by Mauro Bolognini at the Teatro Valle in Rome. The show is recorded live and made into an LP, and transmitted by RAI TV
- Canzonissima, 2nd place with "Per una donna"
- LP "Per una donna".
- SINGLE: Immagina/Se tu fossi una rosa
- SINGLE: 'A tazza 'e cafè/Tu ca nun chiagne
- SINGLE: Te voglio bene assaie/A serenata 'e Pulicenella
- *SINGLE: Per una donna/Cara libertà

1975

- LP Il meglio di Massimo Ranieri (CGD, 69128; antologia)
- LP "Meditazione" with arrangements by Eumir Deodato, with pieces from the classical repertoire.
- "Macchie ‘e culore", at the Teatro Valle, Rome, directed by Mauro Bolognini – recorded live, made into a live LP and a TV show.
- SINGLE: Si ricomincia/23, rue des lillas

1976

- SINGLE: Dal primo momento che ti ho vista/La mia bohème

1978

- LP "La faccia del mare" (The face of the sea), dedicated to Homer's Odyssey.
- SINGLE: La faccia del mare/Odyssea

1981

- LP "Passa lu tiempo e lu munno s'avota"

1983

- "Barnum", recording of the musical show with music by Cy Coleman

1988

- Return to Sanremo Song Festival, 1st prize with "Perdere l'amore"
- LP "Perdere l'amore"
- SINGLE: Perdere l'amore/Dove sta il poeta
- LP of the musical show "Rinaldo in campo".
- LP "Un giorno bellissimo" where he sings the theme song of the TV show "Fantastico-Cinema"

1989

- LP "Da bambino a fantastico" (compilation)

1989

- LP "Un giorno bellissimo"

1990

- LP "Rose rosse" (compilation)

1990

- LP "Vent'anni" (compilation)

1992

- Sanremo "Ti penso"
- LP "Ti penso"
- SINGLE: Ti penso/La notte

1995

- Sanremo with "La vestaglia"
- CD "Ranieri".
- He becomes artistic director of the City of Sorrento Festival.

1997

- Sanremo, with Gianni Togni's ‘Ti parlerò d'amore'
- CD "Canzoni in corso", a selection of songs by various Italian composers

1999

- CD "Hollywood ritratto di un divo" (double CD, from the musical show)

2001

- CD "Oggi o dimane" The start of a collaboration with Mauro Pagani and the revisiting of the great classics of Neapolitan song.
- "Oggi o dimane", theatrical tour of the concert show (his first after 25 years)

2003

- CD "Nun è acqua"
- "Nun è acqua", concert show and tour

2004

- CD "Ranieri canta Napoli" (double CD, with the previous two)
- CD "Les Parisiens", soundtrack of the film trilogy, with music by Francis Lai

2005

- CD "Accussì grande", 3rd collaboration with Mauro Pagani
- "Accussì grande", concert show and tour

2006

- CD "Canto perché non so nuotare...da 40 anni"(double CD for his 40 years of singing career)

2007

- "Canto perché non so nuotare...da 40 anni!" a nationwide tour which lasted for more than 2 years
- "Canto perché non so nuotare...da 40 anni!" live DVD which topped the charts for 27 weeks and became platinum in 2009

2008

- CD "Gold Edition Massimo Ranieri" a triple album containing a live with Neapolitan songs, the best of the double CD "Canto perché non so nuotare...da 40 anni!" and the CD "Canzoni in Corso" un omaggio ai cantautori contemporanei.

2009

- CD "Napoli...Viaggio in Italia" (album)

2011

- Sanremo, a talking and singing show of reminiscences with Gianni Morandi (you can find parts of it on YouTube)
- "Canto perché non so nuotare...da 500 repliche". 500th show
- "Threepenny Opera" di Bertolt Brecht".
- Recital: "Chi nun tene coraggio nun se cocca ch' 'e femmene belle".

2012

- "Raffaele Viviani varietà" directed by Maurizio Scaparro.

2013

- "Canto perché non so nuotare...da 500 repliche". 700th show at the Coliseum Theatre in Turin.
- CD "Sogno e Son Desto" Live

2025

- Sanremo,"Tra le mani un cuore"

== Filmography ==
=== Films ===
Film roles showing year released, title, role played and notes
| Title | Year | Role | Notes |
|---|---|---|---|
| The Most Beautiful Couple in the World | 1967 | Himself | Cameo appearance |
| Metello | 1970 | Metello Salani | |
| Cerca di capirmi | 1970 | Franco Bertoli | |
| Bubù | 1971 | Piero | |
| The Light at the Edge of the World | 1971 | Felipe | |
| Incontro | 1971 | Sandro Zannichelli | |
| Chronicle of a Homicide | 1972 | Fabio Sola | |
| The Cousin | 1974 | Enzo | |
| Salvo D'Acquisto | 1974 | Salvo D'Acquisto | |
| Death Rage | 1976 | Angelo | |
| Born Winner | 1976 | Sandro | |
| Hot Potato | 1979 | Claudio | |
| Priest of Love | 1981 | Piero Pini | |
| L'ultima volta insieme | 1981 | Paolo Antonelli | |
| Chaste and Pure | 1981 | Fernando | |
| Il carabiniere | 1981 | Paolo Palumbo | |
| Legati da tenera amicizia | 1983 | Dorino | |
| Haus im Süden | 1984 | Massimo | |
| The Hunchback of Notre Dame | 1996 | Quasimodo (voice) | Italian dub; voice role Nominated — Academy Award for Best Original Score |
| Volare! | 1997 | Antonio | |
| Fondali notturni | 2000 | Peppino | |
| Legami di famiglia | 2002 | Kuca Maresca | |
| The Hunchback of Notre Dame II | 2002 | Quasimodo (voice) | Italian dub; voice role |
| Les parisiens | 2004 | Massimo | |
| Le courage d'aimer | 2005 | Massimo | |
| Civico zero | 2007 | Giuliano | |
| L'Ultimo Pulcinella | 2008 | Michelangelo Fracanzani | |
| What War May Bring | 2010 | The Singer | Cameo appearance |
| Passione | 2010 | Himself | Documentary film |
| La meravigliosa avventura di Antonio Franconi | 2011 | Antonio Franconi | |
| Capitan Basilico 2 - I fantastici 4+4 | 2011 | Fisherman | Cameo appearance |
| Scossa | 2011 | Salvatore | |
| La macchinazione | 2016 | Pier Paolo Pasolini | |
| Bloody Richard | 2017 | Riccardo Mancini | |
| I Hate Summer | 2020 | Himself | Cameo appearance |
| Mancino naturale | 2021 | Marcello D'Apporto | |
| L'uomo che disegnò Dio | 2021 | Bettler | |

=== Television ===
Television roles showing year released, title, role played and notes
| Title | Year | Role | Notes |
|---|---|---|---|
| Canzonissima | 1969–1975 | Contestant | Variety/musical show (seasons 6–12) |
| Doppia coppia | 1970 | Co-host | Variety show (season 2) |
| Tre donne | 1971 | Tonino | Episode: "La sciantosa" |
| Napulammore | 1974 | Performer | Special |
| Una città in fondo alla strada | 1975 | Lupo | Lead role; 5 episodes |
| Dal primo momento che ti ho visto | 1976 | Co-host | Variety show |
| Storie della camorra | 1978 | Gennaro Abatemaggio | Main role; 6 episodes |
| I ragazzi di celluloide | 1981 | Nicola | Miniseries |
| La vela incantata | 1982 | Angelo | Television film |
| Nata d'amore | 1984 | Maurizio Docque | Miniseries |
| L'ombra nera del Vesuvio | 1986 | Toni Carità | Miniseries |
| Lo scialo | 1987 | Giovanni | Miniseries |
| Il ricatto | 1989 | Massimo Fedeli | Lead role; 6 episodes |
| Fantastico Cinema | 1989–1990 | Presenter | Variety show |
| La festa della mamma | 1992 | Presenter | Special |
| La casa dove abitava Corinne | 1996 | Leonardo | Television film |
| Angelo nero | 1998 | Commissary Vanzi | Miniseries |
| Ama il tuo nemico | 1999 | Father Paolo | Television film |
| Camera Café | 2004–2005 | Anselmo Pedone | Recurring role (seasons 2–3); 8 episodes |
| Accussì grande | 2006 | Performer | Special |
| Operazione pilota | 2007 | Raffaele | Miniseries |
| Senza via d'uscita - Un amore spezzato | 2007 | Matteo Della Torre | Miniseries |
| Filumena Marturano | 2010 | Domenico Soriano | Television film |
| Sogno e son desto | 2014–2016 | Presenter | Variety/musical show |
| Qui e adesso | 2020 | Presenter | Variety show |

== Theatre (actor) ==
- 1976 – "Napoli: chi resta e chi parte" a show comprised by two one-act plays by Raffaele Viviani ("Caffè di notte e giorno" e "Scalo marittimo") directed by Giuseppe Patroni Griffi and shown at the Spoleto "Festival dei due mondi".

"In memoria di una signora amica" a comedy by Giuseppe Patroni Griffi, directed by Mario Ferrero, with Pupella Maggio and Lilla Brignone.

- 1977 – "The Waltz of the Dogs" by Leonid N. Andreyev, directed by Giuseppe Patroni Griffi, with Romolo Valli.
- 1978 – "The imaginary invalid" by Molière, directed by Giorgio De Lullo.
- 1979 – "Twelfth Night" by Shakespeare, directed by Giorgio De Lullo, with Monica Guerritore
- 1980 – "The Good Person of Szechwan" by Bertolt Brecht directed by Giorgio Strehler with Andrea Johansson, Renato De Carmine. At the Teatro Comunale di Milano, and then in a European tour which lasted two years.
- 1983 – "Barnum", a musical by Mark Bramble directed by Buddy Schwab and Ennio Coltorti, with music by Cy Coleman, with Ottavia Piccolo.
- 1986 – "Varietà", directed by Maurizio Scaparro, with Marisa Merlini, Galeazzo Benti and Arturo Brachetti.
- 1987 – "Pulcinella" by Manlio Santanelli (taken from a screenplay by Roberto Rossellini), directed by Maurizio Scaparro.
- 1988 – "Rinaldo in campo", musical comedy written by Domenico Modugno, directed by Garinei and Giovannini.
- 1990–91 – "Pulcinella" reprise
- 1991–92 – "Liolà" by Luigi Pirandello directed by Maurizio Scaparro, with Carlo Croccolo and with original music by Nicola Piovani
- 1993 – "Teatro Excelsior" directed by Maurizio Scaparro with original music by Antonio Sinagra.
- 1994 – "L'Île des esclaves" (The Island of Slaves) by Marivaux, directed by Giorgio Strehler, with Pamela Villoresi, Philippe Leroy and Laura Marinoni, music by Fiorenzo Carpi.
- 1996 – "Le mille e una notte" directed by Maurizio Scaparro, with Laura del Sol.
- 1998 – "Hollywood-Ritratto di un divo", musical by Gianni Togni and Guido Morra, on the love between John Gilbert and Greta Garbo directed by Giuseppe Patroni Griffi
- 2000 – "Il Grande Campione", by Maurizio Fabrizio and Guido Morra, directed by Giuseppe Patroni Griffi, the love story between the boxer Marcel Cerdan and Edith Piaf
- 2007 – He is the narrator voice in "Peter and the Wolf" in a concert with the Solisti Veneti, conducted by Claudio Scimone.
- 2009 – "Polvere di Baghdad" directed by Maurizio Scaparro, his goodbye production as head of the Theatre Sector of the Venice Biennale. Written by Scaparro, together with the poet Adonis and journalist Massimo Nava, it links today's Baghdad with its mythical status as the locus of the 2001 Nights. Ranieri is a storyteller who, from the distant past, is catapulted into today's ruined city.

== Directing (Theatre and Opera) ==
- 2004 – "Cavalleria Rusticana" opera by Pietro Mascagni and "I Pagliacci" by Ruggero Leoncavallo at the Opera Arena Sferisterio in the city of Macerata.
- 2005 – "L'Elisir d'amore" opera by Donizetti at the Teatro di San Carlo of Naples.
- 2006 – "La Traviata" opera by Giuseppe Verdi al Teatro Verdi di Trieste conducted by Daniel Oren.
- 2007 – "La Traviata" at the Tirana National Opera House and at the Teatro di San Carlo in Naples.
- 2008 – "La Cenerentola" opera by Gioachino Rossini at the Teatro Verdi in Teramo

"Poveri ma belli" a musical taken from the film by Dino Risi, with music by Gianni Togni. With Bianca Guaccero, Antonello Angiolillo and Michele Carfora.

- 2009 – "Versi e diversi", a new show written in collaboration with Gualtiero Peirce, at the Ravello Festival.

== Books ==
- 2007 – "Mia madre non-voleva" (with Gualtiero Peirce, published by Rizzoli), autobiography
- 2021 – "Tutti i sogni ancora in volo" (published by Rizzoli), autobiography

== Awards ==
- 1970 – "David di Donatello" and "Premio Internazionale della Critica" awards for "Metello".
- 1972 – National prize "I numeri 1", Radio Montecarlo Prize for popularity.
- 1973 – Telegatto "Vota la voce" (Rank the voice) as Best male singer.
- 1984 – "Positano Top" award for "Barnum".
- 1974 – "Gran simpatico" prize.
- 1987 – Taormina Arte Award.
- 1999 – Ennio Flaiano Award for the Theatre
- 2005 – Premio Barocco and the Premio Sirmione Catullo as Artist of the Year

Premio Nuova Spoleto per L'Arte e lo Spettacolo.

- 2008 – De Sica Award for the Theatre, presented by the President of the Republic Mr. Napolitano.

"Volere Volare, Il meglio del Made in Italy" award, as public person of the year
"La Pigna d'oro" award for his whole career.

- 2009 – Burlamacco d'Oro".

Special Jury Prize of the Festival of Busto Arsizio for the film "L'ultimo Pulcinella", which also was awarded the Best Director prize.
Premio Flaiano (2nd time).

Awards and achievements
| Preceded by Gianni Morandi with "Ma chi se ne importa" | Winner of Canzonissima; 1970 | Succeeded by Nicola Di Bari with "Chitarra suona più piano" |
| Preceded by Gianni Morandi with "Occhi di ragazza" | Italy in the Eurovision Song Contest; 1971 | Succeeded by Nicola Di Bari with "I giorni dell'arcobaleno" |
| Preceded by Nicola Di Bari with "Chitarra suona più piano" | Winner of Canzonissima; 1972 | Succeeded by Gigliola Cinquetti with "Alle porte del sole" |
| Preceded by Nicola Di Bari with "I giorni dell'arcobaleno" | Italy in the Eurovision Song Contest; 1973 | Succeeded by Gigliola Cinquetti with "Sì" |
| Preceded by Gianni Morandi, Enrico Ruggeri & Umberto Tozzi with "Si può dare di più" | Sanremo Music Festival; Winner; 1988 | Succeeded by Anna Oxa & Fausto Leali with "Ti lascerò" |
