= Renato Brioschi =

Italian composer

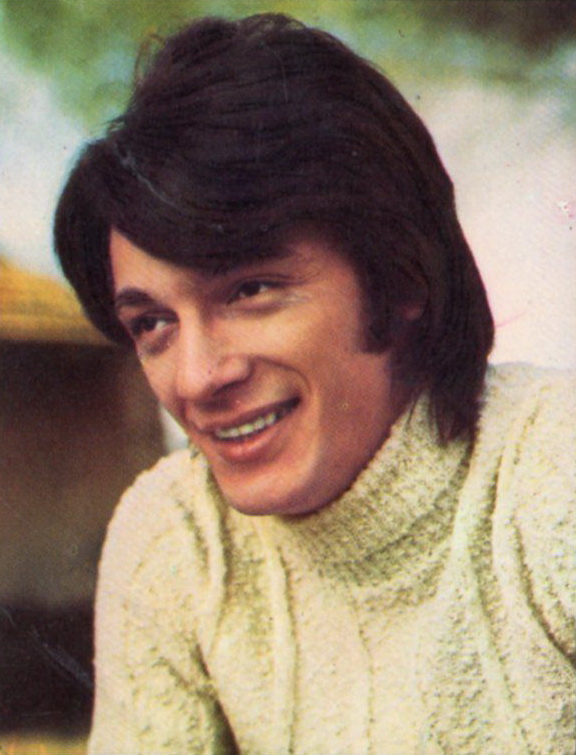
- Renato Brioschi, 1972.
- Born: 20 April 1948 (age 78); Milan, Italy
- Occupations: Composer, singer

Renato Brioschi (born 20 April 1948), also known as Renato dei Profeti, is an Italian singer, composer, musician and producer.

Born in Milan, the son of the sculptor Remo, Brioschi was founder, frontman and singer of the musical group I Profeti, with whom he got several hits in the late 1960s. In 1970 he recorded, with the name "Renato dei Profeti", ″Lady Barbara″; the song won the Un disco per l'estate festival and peaked at first place on the Italian hit parade, and following the success of the song Brioschi left the group to pursue a solo career. The same year he debuted as an actor starring in Lady Barbara, a musicarello named after the song and directed by Mario Amendola.

After some successful singles, in 1974 Brioschi debuted as singer-songwriter with the song "Giochi senza età", which became a hit in France. In the following years he focused on composing and producing, and was the author of several hits for Alice, Eros Ramazzotti, Mia Martini, Fausto Leali, Viola Valentino among others. In the late 1980s he reprised his activity as a singer, first with his former group I Profeti for a short-lived reunion, later as a soloist.
