= I Profeti =

Italian pop group

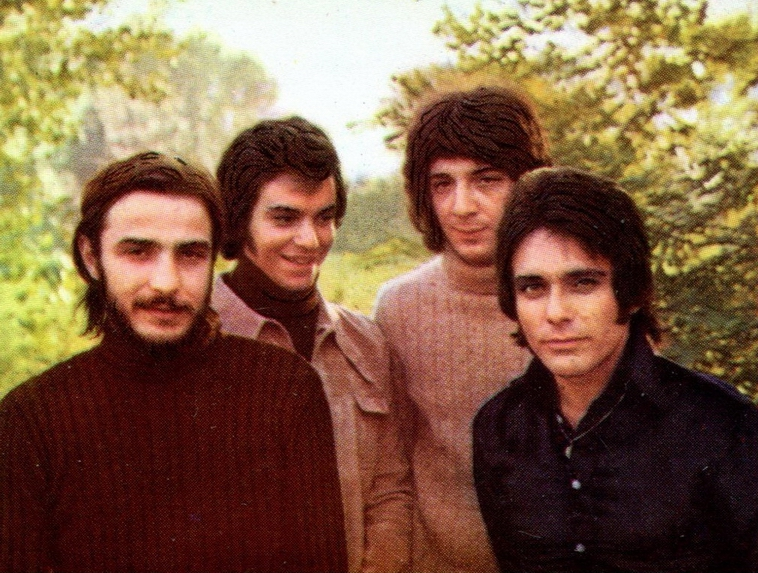
I Profeti in 1972

I Profeti ("The Prophets") were an Italian pop group, mainly successful in the late sixties and in the seventies.

== Career ==
The group formed in 1964 in Milan. They initially had a beat repertoire, and released their first single in 1966, "Bambina sola", a cover of The Grass Roots' "You're a Lonely Girl". In 1967 the band released their first album, Bambina sola, which was widely influenced by American contemporary folk music. In 1968 the band got their first domestic hit with "Gli occhi verdi dell'amore", a cover of Chip Taylor's "Angel of the Morning". The song signalled a progressive distancing from the Beat genre.

In 1970 lead singer Renato Brioschi recorded, with the name "Renato dei Profeti", the song ″Lady Barbara,″ which peaked at first place on the Italian hit parade. Following the success of the song, Brioschi left the group to pursue a solo career. From then Profeti gradually switched to a more melodic, pop-oriented sound. Their singles "Era bella", "Prima notte senza lei" and "Io perché, io per chi", released between 1971 and 1973, all charted on the Italian hit parade, respectively peaking at sixth, eighteenth and tenth place.

In 1976 Profeti entered the main competition at the Sanremo Music Festival, ranking fifteenth with the song "Cercati un'anima". The group disbanded shortly after, before briefly reuniting in the late 1980s for a series of live performances and television appearances.

== Personnel ==
- Renato Brioschi – voice, electric guitar (1964–1970)
- Nazareno La Rovere – guitar (1964–1968; 1970–1977)
- Donato Ciletti – bass guitar(1964–1966; 1969–1977)
- Osvaldo Bernasconi – drums (1964–1967; 1968–1972; 1974–1977)
- Danny Besquet – bass guitar (1966–1967)
- Roberto Margaria – bass guitar, guitar (1967–1969; 1969–1970)
- Franco D'Onofrio – drums (1967–1968)
- Raffaele Favero – drums, flute (1967–1968)
- Maurizio Bellini – organ (1969–1973)
- Claudio Belloli – drums (1972–1974)
- Beppe Tiranzoni – organ, keyboards (1974–1977)

== Discography ==
Albums

- 1967: Bambina sola (CBS, S 52436)
- 1971: Era bella (CBS, S 64758)
- 1974: L'amore è... (CBS, S 69033)
- 1976: Cercati un'anima (CBS, S 69144)
