= Marcella Bella =

Italian pop singer

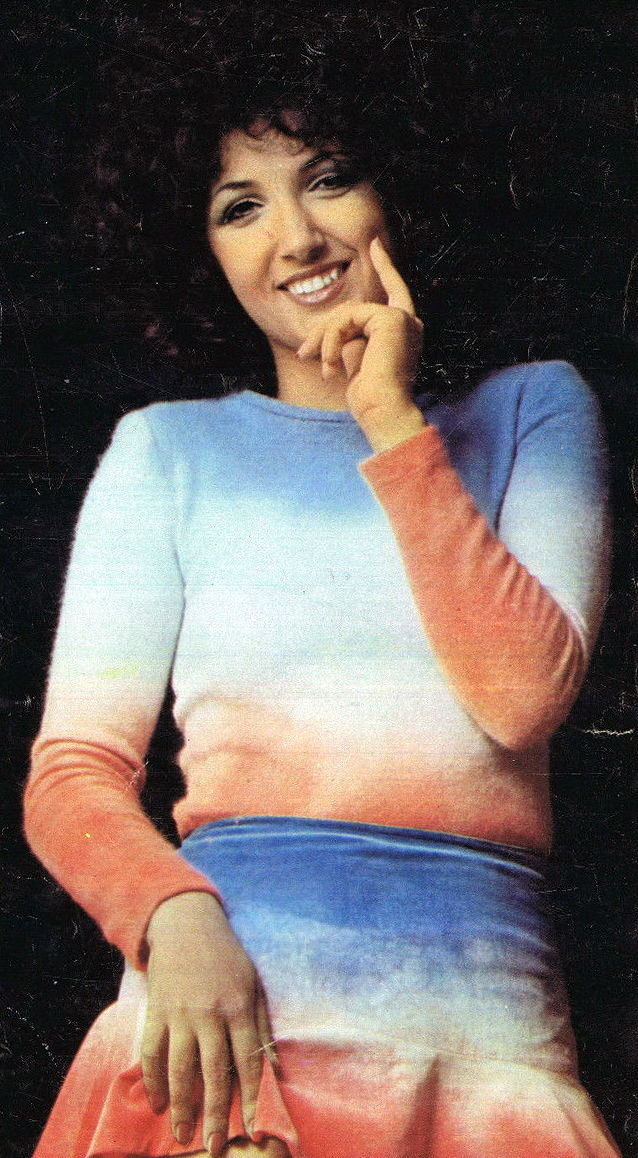
- Bella in 1972

Background information
- Born: Giuseppa Marcella Bella; 18 June 1952 (age 73); Catania, Italy
- Genres: Pop
- Occupation: Singer
- Years active: 1965–present

Giuseppa Marcella Bella (born 18 June 1952), known as just Marcella Bella or simply Marcella, is an Italian pop singer with a career spanning six decades. Her repertoire includes several songs composed by her brother Gianni.

== Life and career ==
Born in Catania into an artistic family (her brothers Antonio and Salvatore are musicians, and her brother Gianni is a singer-songwriter), Bella started her career at very young age, and in 1965 she won the Festival degli sconosciuti, a victory that was not validated because she was two years younger than the rules required. She made her record debut in 1969, with the single "Il pagliaccio", using the mononym Marcella.

Bella got her first success in 1971, with the single "Hai ragione tu". In 1972, she had her breakthrough taking part in the Sanremo Music Festival with "Montagne verdi", a semi-autobiographical song penned by her brother Gianni which turned to be a massive commercial hit. She later performed in other musical events, being a finalist in the 1973 edition of Canzonissima with "Un sorriso e poi perdonami", and winning the Festivalbar with "Io domani". Other significant successes of the decade include "Nessuno mai", later covered by Boney M. in an English version titled "Take the Heat off Me" and included in their eponymous album, "Abbracciati", which she presented out of competition at the 1977 Sanremo Festival, and her cover version of Domenico Modugno's canzone napoletana classic "Resta cu' mme".

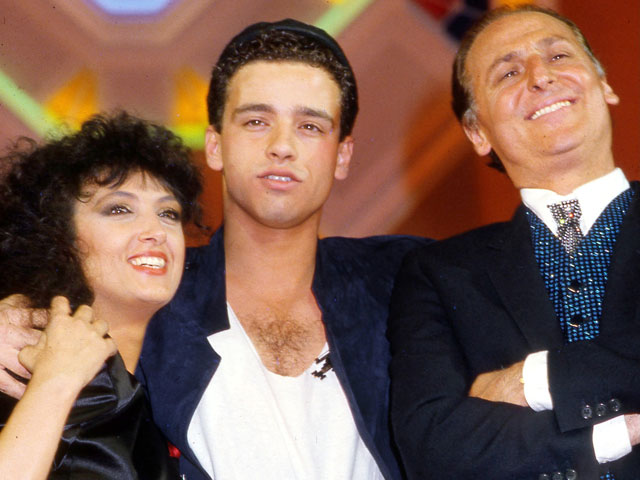
Bella at Sanremo 1986 with Eros Ramazzotti and Renzo Arbore

After a period of relative tarnish, in the early 1980s Bella began recording under her full name, and achieved an impressive success in 1983 with "Nell'aria", a song penned by Mogol together with her brother Gianni. Other hits followed across the whole decade, mainly linked to her participations to the Sanremo Festival, notably "Senza un briciolo di testa" (third place at Sanremo 1986), "Tanti auguri" (Sanremo 1987), "Dopo la tempesta" (Sanremo 1988) and "Verso l'ignoto" (a duet with Gianni Bella presented at Sanremo 1990). In the 1990s she slowed her activities. She ran in the 2004 European Parliament election with National Alliance party, being not elected. In 2005, she returned to the Sanremo Festival after a fifteen-year absence with the song "Uomo bastardo", ranking second in the "classics" tournament.

In 2024, Bella, with the song "Chi siamo davvero", competed in the final of Una voce per San Marino 2024, the Sammarinese national selection for the Eurovision Song Contest 2024. In December 2024, she was announced as one of the participants in the Sanremo Music Festival 2025. She placed last in a field of 29 with the song "Pelle diamante". On 24 December 2024, Bella was awarded by His Royal Highness The Crown Prince of Georgia David Bagration of Mukhrani the title of Dame Grand Cross of the Order of the Eagle and the Seamless Tunic of Our Lord Jesus Christ in recognition to her long and successful career, spanning over 50 years.

== Discography ==
=== Albums ===
- 1972: Tu non-hai la più pallida idea dell'amore
- 1973: Mi..ti..amo...
- 1974: Metamorfosi
- 1975: L'anima dei matti
- 1976: Bella
- 1977: Femmina
- 1979: Camminando e cantando
- 1981: Marcella Bella
- 1982: Problemi
- 1983: Nell'aria
- 1984: Nel mio cielo puro
- 1986: Senza un briciolo di testa
- 1987: Tanti auguri
- 1988: '88
- 1990: Canta Battisti
- 1990: Verso l'ignoto...
- 1991: Sotto il vulcano
- 1993: Tommaso!
- 1995: Anni dorati
- 1998: Finalmente insieme
- 2002: Passato e presente
- 2005: Uomo bastardo
- 2007: Forever per sempre (with Gianni Bella)
- 2012: Femmina bella
- 2017: Metà amore metà dolore
- 2019: 50 anni di Bella Musica
- 2023: Etnea

=== Singles ===
- 1969: "Il pagliaccio"
- 1969: "Bocca dolce"
- 1971: "Hai ragione tu"
- 1972: "Montagne verdi"
- 1972: "Sole che nasce sole che muore"
- 1972: "Un sorriso e poi perdonami"
- 1973: "Io domani"
- 1973: "Mi...ti...amo"
- 1974: "Nessuno mai"
- 1974: "L'avvenire"
- 1975: "E quando"
- 1975: "Negro"
- 1976: "Resta cu' mme"
- 1976: "Abbracciati"
- 1977: "Non m'importa più"
- 1978: "Mi vuoi"
- 1979: "Lady anima"
- 1979: "Camminando e cantando"
- 1980: "Baciami"
- 1981: "Pensa per te"
- 1981: "Canto straniero"
- 1981: "Mi mancherai*
- 1982: "Problemi"
- 1983: "Nell'aria"
- 1984: "Nel mio cielo puro"
- 1985: "L'ultima poesia" (with Gianni Bella)
- 1986: "Senza un briciolo di testa"
- 1987: "Tanti auguri"
- 1988: "Dopo la tempesta"
- 1990: "Verso l'ignoto" (with Gianni Bella)
- 1998: "È un miracolo" (with Gianni Bella)
- 2002: "La regina del silenzio"
- 2007: "Forever per sempre"
- 2012: "Malecon"
- 2012: "Femmina bella"
- 2025: "Pelle diamante"
