= Maggie Mae (singer) =

German singer (1960–2021)

- Born: Andrea Cosima Carle; 13 May 1960; Karlsruhe, West Germany
- Died: 30 August 2021 (aged 61) Melbourne, Florida, United States
- Occupation: Singer

Andrea Cosima Carle (13 May 1960 – 30 August 2021), known by the stage name Maggie Mae, was a German singer.

== Biography ==
Maggie Mae released her first single, Ich hab’ Spaß am Leben, in 1974. She later released a German-language cover of "My Boy Lollipop" by Millie Small. Due to her young age and funky appearance, she was nicknamed "Das verrückte Huhn" ("the mad hen"). In 1975, she participated in the West Germany selection competition for the Eurovision Song Contest with the song Die total verrückte Zeit and reached the 7th place. She returned the following year, singing Applaus für ein total verrücktes Haus and finishing third. In the 1980s, she retired from her singing career following her marriage to Robert Trammel and her move to the United States.

Maggie Mae died of COVID-19 in Melbourne, Florida, on 30 August 2021, at the age of 61.

== Discography ==
=== Singles ===
- Ich hab' Spaß am Leben (1974)
- My Boy Lollypop (1975)
- Die total verrückte Zeit (1975)
- Sweet beat honey sunny boy/Itsy bitsy teenie weenie Honolulu Strandbikini (1975)
- I'm on fire (1975)
- Sing my song (1976)
- Applaus für ein total verrücktes Haus (1976)
- Und sein Name war No (1977)
- Und dann noch eins - Ich liebe dich (1977)
- Dieses ist mein Land (1978)
- Komm, klopf' heut Nacht an die Tür (I'm gonna knock on your door) (1979)
- Das allererste Mal (um alles zu erfahren) (1979)
- James Dean - Superstar (1980)
- Rock 'n' Roll Cowboy (Making your mind up) (1981)
- Lutsch mit! (1981)
- Und der Weihnachtsmann behauptet, er ist Elvis (1982)

=== Album ===
- I'm on fire (1975)
