= Maurizio Scaparro =

Italian stage and film director, playwright, journalist and author (1932–2023)

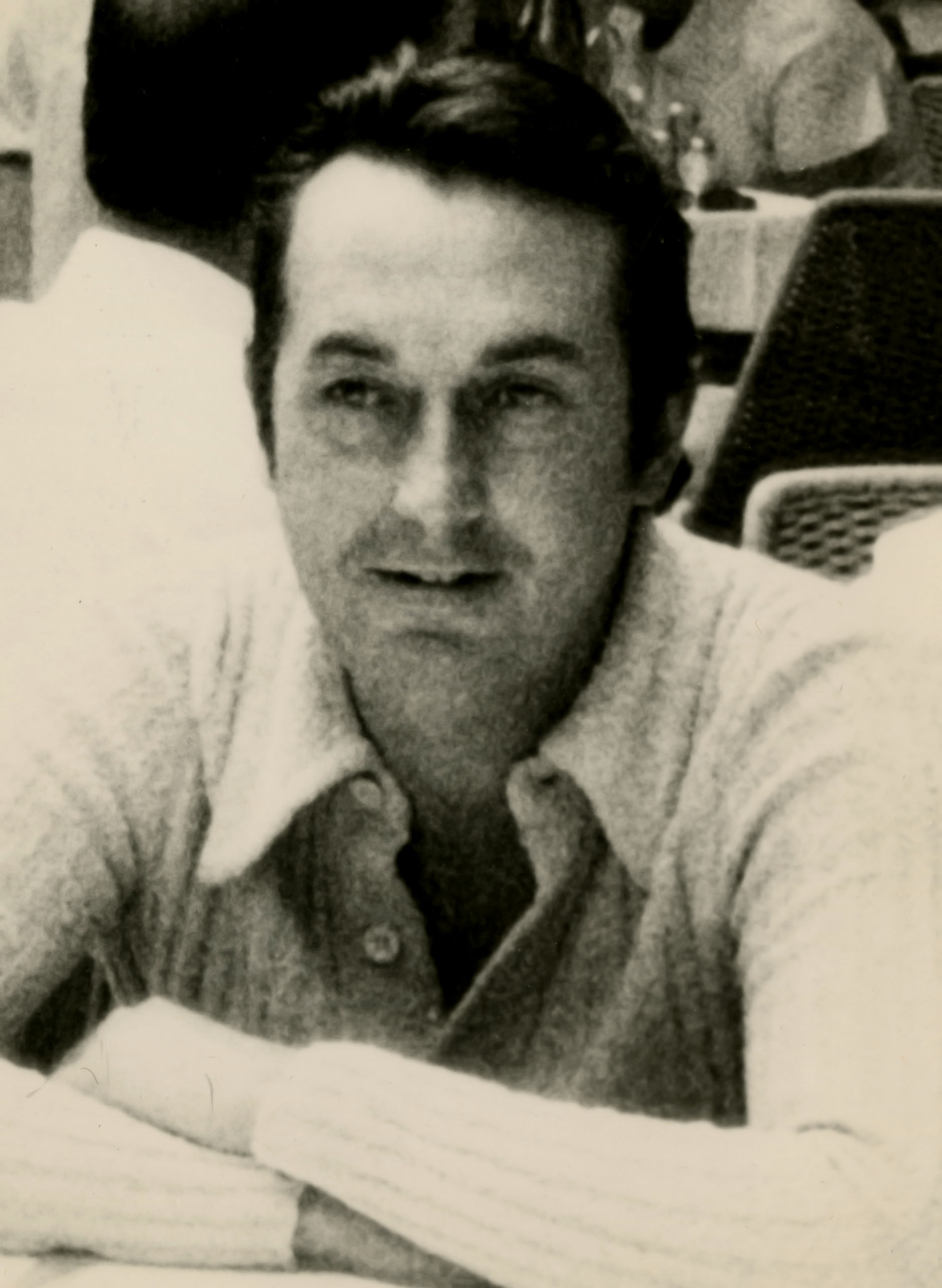
Scaparro in 1975

Maurizio Scaparro (19 January 1932 – 17 February 2023) was an Italian stage and film director, playwright, journalist, and author.

Born in Rome, in the early 1950s Scaparro started working as a journalist and a theatre critic for the newspaper L'Avanti! and later for the magazine Maschere, rassegna mensile di vita del teatro. In 1961 he became the director of the magazine Teatro Nuovo, and in 1963 he was appointed artistic director of the Stable Theatre in Bologna. He debuted as a stage director in 1964, with the play Festa grande di aprile, and got a first large critical acclaim in 1965 with his version of Carlo Goldoni's comedy La Venexiana, which he first represented at the Festival of Two Worlds in Spoleto.

During his career Scaparro directed over sixty plays, and was artistic director of several theatres, as well as of the theatrical section at the Venice Biennale. He also directed a number of films.

Scaparro died on 17 February 2023, at the age of 91.
