= Gianni Bella =

Italian musician

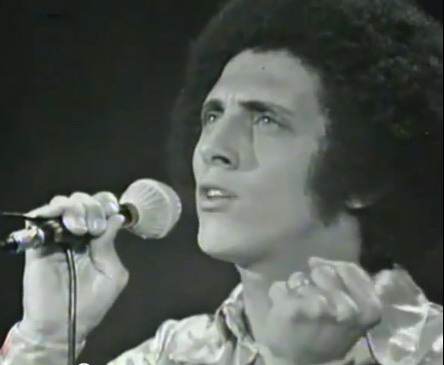
- Bella in Canzonissima (1974)

Background information
- Born: Giovanni Bella; 14 March 1947 (age 79); Catania, Italy
- Genres: Pop; pop rock
- Occupations: Singer-songwriter; composer; producer
- Years active: 1969–present
- Labels: Polydor Records; CBS

Giovanni "Gianni" Bella (born 14 March 1947) is an Italian composer and singer-songwriter, the brother of singer Marcella Bella.

== Background ==
Born in Catania, Bella started his career as composer for his sister, singer Marcella Bella authoring several hits with lyricist Giancarlo Bigazzi. In the seventies he debuted as a singer himself, scoring his first major success in 1974 with the song "Più ci penso", which ranked second in the Italian hit parade. In 1976 he topped the hit parade and won the Festivalbar contest with the song "Non si può morire dentro", originally planned to be sung by his sister. In 1981 he entered the competition at the Sanremo Music Festival with the song "Questo amore non si tocca"; he returned in Sanremo five more times between 1986 and 2007, three times in couple with his sister Marcella. In 1983 Bella stopped the collaboration with Bigazzi and started a new phase alongside Mogol; between late 1990s and 2000s the couple signed some extraordinary sales successes for Adriano Celentano. In January 2010 he suffered a stroke and subsequently he lost his speech and the use of a leg.

== Discography ==
=== Studio albums ===
- 1974 - Guarda che ti amo (Derby)
- 1976 - Sogni di un robot (Derby)
- 1977 - Io canto e tu (Derby)
- 1978 - Toc toc (CGD)
- 1980 - Dolce uragano (CGD)
- 1981 - Questo amore... (CGD)
- 1983 - G.b.1 - Nuova gente (Avventura)
- 1984 - G.b.2 (Avventura)
- 1986 - Una luce (RCA Italiana)
- 1988 - Due cuori rossi di vergogna (Polydor)
- 1991 - La fila degli oleandri (Fonit Cetra)
- 1994 - Vocalist (Fonit Cetra) (Note: The album was republished in 1995 with the title Belladonna by Pull Music/CGD East West.)
- 1998 - Finalmente insieme (with Marcella Bella) (Pull/Fuego)
- 2001 - Il profumo del mare (SDC/Sony Music)
- 2007 - Forever per sempre (with Marcella Bella) (Nuova Gente/Universal Music)

=== Live albums ===
- 1992 - Gianni Bella Live (Fonit Cetra)
- 1996 - Grandi successi - Live (Duck Records)

=== Selected singles ===
Year	Title	IT
1974	Più ci penso	2
1976	Non si può morire dentro	1
1977	Io canto e tu	7
1978	No	7
1978	Toc toc	16
1980	Dolce uragano	7
1981	Questo amore non si tocca	14
1985	L'ultima poesia	6
1990	Verso l'ignoto	7
1991	La fila degli oleandri	38
2007	Forever per sempre	14
