= Giancarlo Bigazzi =

Italian music producer and composer (1940–2012)

- Bigazzi in the late 1980s

Background information
- Born: 5 September 1940; Florence, Tuscany, Kingdom of Italy
- Died: 19 January 2012 (aged 71) Lido di Camaiore, Tuscany, Italy
- Genres: Pop; comedy
- Occupations: Composer; music producer
- Formerly of: Squallor

Giancarlo Bigazzi (pronounced [dʒaŋˈkarlo biˈɡattsi]; 5 September 1940 – 19 January 2012) was an Italian music producer and composer. He was a former member of comedy music group Squallor.

== Life and career ==
Born in Florence, he was one of the best known Italian songwriters and lyricists of the 1970s and 1980s. He wrote some of the most successful Italian pop records, many of which became international hits, such as "Gloria", "Self Control", "No Me Ames", "Tu", "Take the Heat off Me", and "Ti amo". He was also a film score composer; among his soundtracks are Forever Mary, Boys on the Outside and the Academy Award-winning Mediterraneo.

He began his career at a very young age, writing major hits for Riccardo Del Turco ("Luglio"), Caterina Caselli ("Il carnevale"), Mario Tessuto ("Lisa dagli occhi blu"), and Renato dei Profeti ("Lady Barbara").

Throughout the 1970s, Bigazzi established himself as a prolific lyricist and composer, often collaborating with Totò Savio on songs for Massimo Ranieri ("Vent'anni”, "Erba di casa mia"), and with Gianni and Antonio Bella on hits for Marcella Bella ("Montagne verdi", "Io domani", "Nessuno mai", "Un sorriso e poi perdonami") and Gianni Bella ("Non si può morire dentro", "No", "Più ci penso", "Questo amore non si tocca"). He also worked with Claudio Cavallaro on tracks for I Camaleonti ("Eternità", "Come sei bella", "Oggi il cielo è rosa") and Gigliola Cinquetti. Between 1970 and 1971, he produced the band I Califfi, co-writing songs such as "Acqua e sapone" and "Lola bella mia" with Franco Boldrini.

In 1971, Bigazzi co-founded the satirical music group Squallor with Daniele Pace, Totò Savio, Alfredo Cerruti and Elio Gariboldi. Initially conceived as a parody, the group achieved remarkable popularity, releasing albums for over two decades. Bigazzi contributed lyrics, music, and occasionally performed in their songs and films (Arrapaho, Uccelli d'Italia).

From 1974 to 1978, he co-produced the pop-rock band Il Giardino dei Semplici with Savio, writing several of their best-known songs, including "M'innamorai", "Miele", "Vai", and "Tamburino".

In the mid-1970s, Bigazzi began a fruitful collaboration with Umberto Tozzi, helping to launch his career and co-writing many of his greatest hits: "Donna amante mia", "Ti amo", “Tu”, "Gloria", "Notte rosa", "Eva", and the Sanremo-winning song "Si può dare di più" (performed by Tozzi, Gianni Morandi and Enrico Ruggeri). He also wrote for other artists, including "L'amore è quando non c'è più" (Euro Cristiani) and "Un amore grande" (Pupo).

Between the mid-1980s and early 1990s, he established a production team in Florence, mentoring and producing early works by Marco Masini, Raf, Alessandro Canino, Paolo Vallesi, Aleandro Baldi, and Danilo Amerio. During this period, he frequently collaborated with Tuscan lyricist Beppe Dati.

In 1992, he wrote "Rapsodia" for Mia Martini's Eurovision performance and co-wrote "Gli uomini non cambiano". In 1996, he co-wrote "Cirano" with Beppe Dati, performed by Francesco Guccini.

His wife Gianna Albini, also a lyricist, often contributed to his works, particularly during their creative retreats at Villa Cingallegra in Settignano, Florence.

Bigazzi's final artistic contribution was the album Inutilmente utile, written and produced for Italian singer-songwriter Sirio Martelli. The album also served as the official soundtrack for the 2016 film Gli Infami directed by Alessandro Paci.

He died on 19 January 2012 at the age of 71 at the Versilia Hospital in Lido di Camaiore, due to a brain infection.
