= Un disco per l'estate =

Italian TV music festival, 1964–2003

- Genre: Rock, pop, etc.
- Location: Italy
- Years active: 1964–2003
- Founders: Italian record industry association, AFI, RAI

Un disco per l'estate (translation "A Record for the Summer") was an Italian Summer festival held from 1964 to 2003. It was organized and sponsored by the Italian record industry association, AFI, and by RAI, except for the editions between 1995 and 2000, in which the festival was organized and broadcast by Mediaset. The festival initially consisted in a musical competition with a first elimination round held on radio and the final round aired on TV, then during the years it primarily became a prominent television event, with no contest or just a side competition reserved for emerging artists.

== See also ==
- List of historic rock festivals
- List of music festivals in Italy
