= Sanremo Music Festival 1978 =

Italian song contest (28th edition)

Dates and venue
- First night: 26 January 1978
- Second night: 27 January 1978
- Final night: 28 January 1978
- Venue: Teatro Ariston; Sanremo, Italy

Organisation
- Organiser: Vittorio Salvetti

Production
- Broadcaster: Radiotelevisione italiana (RAI)
- Director: Antonio Moretti
- Musical director: Paolo Zavallone
- Presenters: Maria Giovanna Elmi; Stefania Casini (first night, final); Vittorio Salvetti (first night, final); Beppe Grillo (final)

Solo artists section
- Number of entries: 5
- Winner: "Un'emozione da poco" Anna Oxa

Groups section
- Number of entries: 4
- Winner: "...e dirsi ciao" Matia Bazar

Singer-songwriters section
- Number of entries: 5
- Winner: "Gianna"; Rino Gaetano

The Sanremo Music Festival 1978 (Italian: Festival di Sanremo 1978), officially the 28th Italian Song Festival (28º Festival della canzone italiana), was the 28th annual Sanremo Music Festival, held at the Teatro Ariston in Sanremo between 26 and 28 January 1978. It was organised by Vittorio Salvetti under sponsorship from the municipality of Sanremo and broadcast by Radiotelevisione italiana (RAI). The shows were presented by Maria Giovanna Elmi, assisted by Stefania Casini, Beppe Grillo and Vittorio Salvetti.

The edition's format divided the entries into sections based on their performer: solo artists, groups, and singer-songwriters. The winning song overall was "...e dirsi ciao" performed by Matia Bazar, which also won the groups section; with "Un'emozione da poco", performed by Anna Oxa, winning the solo artists section and "Gianna", performed by Rino Gaetano, winning the singer-songwriters section.

== Format ==
In August 1977, two of the festival's former organisers, Vittorio Salvetti and Gianni Ravera, each presented proposals to the municipality of Sanremo to organise the event's 1978 edition. Despite support from unions for Ravera's proposal, the municipal council agreed to entrust the festival's organisation to Salvetti for the third consecutive year during a meeting on 28 October. Salvetti's proposal included separating the competing artists into categories and having their entries performed in only two of the festival's three nights, with the remaining night dedicated to a gala highlighting guest artists from different countries.

Salvetti's proposal also included moving the dates of the festival from March to January. The event was initially scheduled to take place between 19 and 21 January 1978, but was pushed back by a week from 26 to 28 January to comply with a request made by Radiotelevisione italiana (RAI). Additionally, a tour starring the festival's participating artists was scheduled for after its conclusion, starting with locations in Italy and moving to cities throughout the United States and Canada from 9 to 16 April.

Since the event's traditional venue, the ballroom of the Sanremo Casino, was undergoing a series of renovations that began in 1976, the Teatro Ariston was chosen as the venue for the second year in a row. The stage was designed by Rino Ceriolo and adorned with roses, gladioli and orchids, featuring a backdrop with a sun painted in warm hues spanning seven hundred square metres.

=== Voting ===
The competing songs were separated into three sections based on their performer: solo artists, groups, and singer-songwriters, with voting during the final night held across two rounds to determine a winner of each section in addition to an overall winner. The voting in both rounds was conducted by a jury representing five Italian cities, each consisting of nine members gathered at a location with people from specific professions or communities, including a hotel in Bari, a dance hall in Bologna, a nightclub in Florence, a hospital in Genoa and a football club in Venice.

In the first round, after all of the songs competing in a section were performed, each jury member voted for three. The results from each city's jury were then presented individually and displayed on a scoreboard next to the stage, with three songs per section qualifying to the second round. During the second round, two-minute versions of the nine remaining songs were performed consecutively, with jury members voting afterwards for one song per section. The results were displayed on the scoreboard all at once, determining the three winners. The points gathered during the round were used to form a ranking, with the song that received the most points declared the overall winner of the competition.

== Competing entries ==
At the request of entertainment unions, the municipality of Sanremo decided to include a song selection commission in the festival's regulations for the first time since the 1975 edition, rather than give the festival's organiser, Vittorio Salvetti, the right to choose artists for the event at his own discretion as was previously planned. The municipality received only thirty song submissions from record labels for the event, noted by press to be one of the smallest amounts in the festival's history, and a commission was formed, tasked with selecting fifteen to compete. The commission was chaired by Salvetti and composed of three union representatives—David Grieco, Giaime Pintor and Piero Vivarelli, as well as three members appointed by the municipality of Sanremo—Ettore Oddo, Antonio Montini and Giuseppe Albà.

Shortly after the fifteen competing songs were selected on 30 December, the three union representatives part of the commission put out a statement denouncing the song selection process. They argued that Salvetti and the other commission members imposed the selection of nine of the fifteen songs in the final stage of the process, disregarding submissions that had previously received approval by a large majority of the commission for irrelevant reasons not included in the selection criteria.

The full list of competing artists and their songs was announced on 9 January 1978, divided into sections for solo artists, groups and singer-songwriters. With the announcement, the festival's organisers stated one of the competing songs in the groups section, "Lola" intended to be performed by the duo Chrisma, was disqualified for breaking the rules of the competition by having already been performed on television in 1977, which left only four songs to compete in the groups section.

◇ Entry disqualified

Competing entries – Solo artists
Song	Artist	Songwriter(s)
"Un'emozione da poco"	Anna Oxa	Ivano Fossati; Guido Guglielminetti
"Anna Anna"	Donato Ciletti	Claudio Cavallaro; Donato Ciletti; Daniele Pace; Oscar Avogadro
"Ora"	Dora Moroni	Enrico Intra; Franco Marino; Claudio Rego; Donatella Rettore
"Domani, domani"	Laura Luca	Alberto Nicorelli; Dante Pieretti
"Armonia e poesia"	Santino Rocchetti	Santino Rocchetti; Andrea Lo Vecchio

Competing entries – Groups
Song	Artist	Songwriter(s)
"Soli"	Beans	Gianni Bella; Antonio Bella
"Lola" ◇	Chrisma ◇	Julie Scott; Maurizio Arcieri ◇
"½ notte"	Daniel Sentacruz Ensemble	Zacar; Savino Grieco; Sentacruz
"...e dirsi ciao"	Matia Bazar	Antonella Ruggiero; Carlo Marrale; Piero Cassano; Giancarlo Golzi; Salvatore Stellita
"Il mio amore"	Schola Cantorum	Enrico Fusco; Marco Luberti

Competing entries – Singer-songwriters
Song	Artist	Songwriter(s)
"Tu sola"	Anselmo Genovese	Anselmo Genovese; Luigi Capello
"Il buio e tu"	Ciro Sebastianelli	Ciro Sebastianelli; Daniele Pace; Oscar Avogadro
"Quando Teresa verrà"	Marco Ferradini	Marco Ferradini; Simon Luca
"Gianna"	Rino Gaetano	Rino Gaetano
"'N' addore 'e castagne"	Roberto Carrino	Roberto Carrino; Mario Coppola

== Shows ==
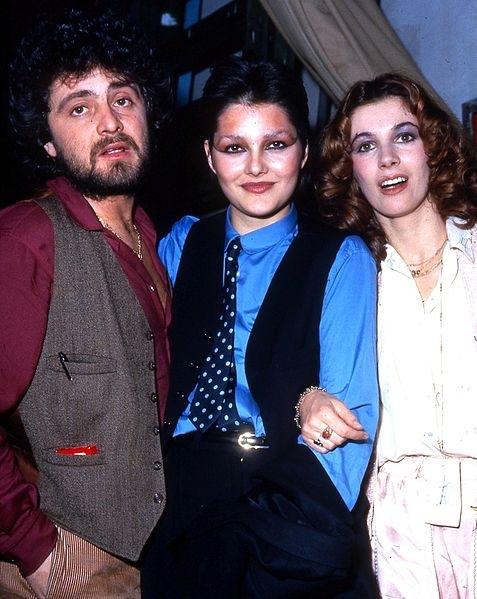
Winner of the solo artists section, Anna Oxa (center), between hosts Beppe Grillo and Stefania Casini

The festival consisted of three shows: a first night held on 26 January broadcast under the title Sanremo Anteprima, the Galà delle Nazioni held on 27 January, which served as the second night, and a final held on 28 January. The first two nights were presented by Maria Giovanna Elmi, with Sanremo Anteprima featuring an introduction from Stefania Casini and interviews conducted by the festival's organiser, Vittorio Salvetti. During the final night, Elmi was assisted by Casini, Salvetti and the comedian Beppe Grillo. Casini conducted interviews with audience members and Grillo performed stand-up comedy interludes, while Salvetti sat at a booth below the scoreboard and introduced each performance, explained the rules of the competition and presented the voting sequences. The shows were directed by Antonio Moretti.

A running order for the competing songs was determined by random draw before the shows. The twenty-two piece Orchestra Azzurra under the direction of Paolo Zavallone was employed for the event and featured on stage. The song "Jeansflower" was composed by Zavallone to serve as the festival's opening theme.

=== First night ===
The first night was held on 26 January 1978. The show featured all fourteen competing artists performing their songs for the first time without facing a vote, in addition to interviews with journalists in the audience conducted by the festival's organiser, Vittorio Salvetti. A forty minute program was recorded during the night titled Sanremo Anteprima and broadcast the following day. At the end of the night, Grace Jones performed a set on stage recorded to be broadcast as a television special at a later date.

First night – 26 January 1978
R/O	Song	Artist
1	"Domani, domani"	Laura Luca
2	"Anna Anna"	Donato Ciletti
3	"Ora"	Dora Moroni
4	"Armonia e poesia"	Santino Rocchetti
5	"Un'emozione da poco"	Anna Oxa
6	"Il mio amore"	Schola Cantorum
7	"Soli"	Beans
8	"½ notte"	Daniel Sentacruz Ensemble
9	"...e dirsi ciao"	Matia Bazar
10	"Tu sola"	Anselmo Genovese
11	"'N' addore 'e castagne"	Roberto Carrino
12	"Quando Teresa verrà"	Marco Ferradini
13	"Gianna"	Rino Gaetano
14	"Il buio e tu"	Ciro Sebastianelli

=== Second night ===
The Galà delle Nazioni was held on 27 January 1978, serving as the festival's second night. The show featured performances from various Italian and international guest artists representing their country of origin, and was recorded with the intention to be aired at a later date.

The show opened with the festival's musical director, Paolo Zavallone, performing his song "Mucho mucho" under his stage name El Pasador. The remainder of the show contained performances from guest artists, including Maggie MacNeal performing "Winter in Berlin", Loredana Bertè performing "Grida", Pablo Abraira performing "Falco... e poi colomba", Fred Bongusto performing "Balliamo" and "Una rotonda sul mare", Asha Puthli performing "I'm Gonna Dance", Gigliola Cinquetti performing "Un paese vuol dire", Riccardo Cocciante performing "A mano a mano", "Storie" and "Notturno", Patty Pravo performing "Pensiero stupendo" and "Bello", Julio Iglesias performing "Sono un pirata, sono un signore", "Pensami", "Abbracciami", "Seguirò il mio cammino" and "Se mi lasci non vale", Bonnie Tyler performing "It's a Heartache", Grace Jones performing "La Vie en rose" and the MMC Magical Music Circus performing "Amico Elvis".

=== Final night ===
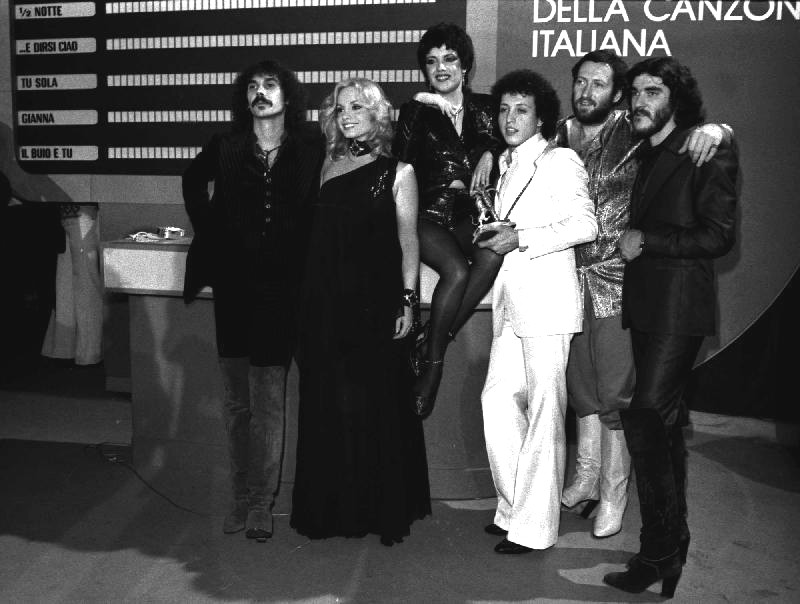
Winners Matia Bazar holding the first prize with host Maria Giovanna Elmi (second from left)

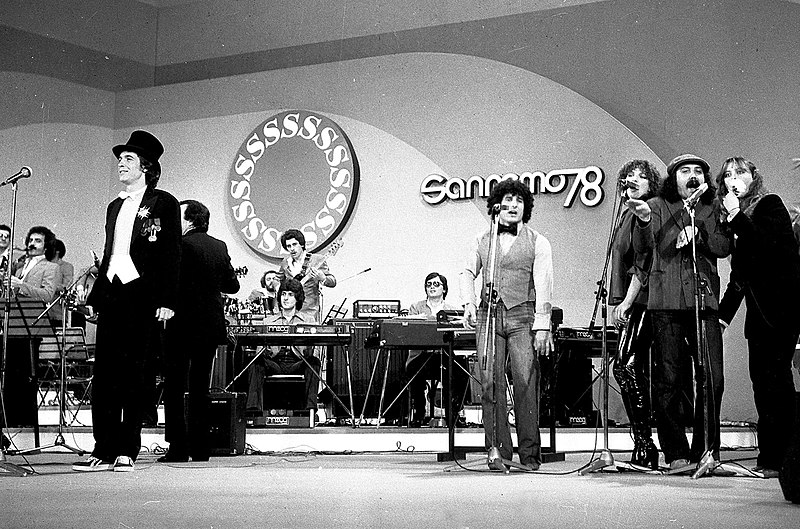
Winner of the singer-songwriters section, Rino Gaetano (left) performing "Gianna" during the festival

The final night was held on 28 January 1978. The fourteen competing artists performed their songs again, accompanied by the orchestra and separated into sections for solo artists, groups and singer-songwriters. Three songs from each section qualified to the second round, in which shortened versions of the songs were performed using playback, and a winner of each section as well as an overall winner were chosen.

Guest appearances during the show included Asha Puthli performing her song "The Devil Is Loose", Belle Epoque performing their song "Bamalama", Bonnie Tyler performing her song "It's a Heartache", Grace Jones performing a rendition of "La Vie en rose" and Sheila and B. Devotion performing a rendition of "Singin' in the Rain".

"...e dirsi ciao", written and performed by the band Matia Bazar, was the winning song of the groups section and the overall competition. "Un'emozione da poco", written by Ivano Fossati and Guido Guglielminetti, and performed by Anna Oxa, was the winner of the solo artists section and achieved second place overall; and "Gianna", written and performed by Rino Gaetano, was the winner of the singer-songwriters section and achieved third place overall. At the end of the show, Matia Bazar reprised their song in full as the festival's overall winners, while the winners of the other sections reprised their songs in shortened versions.

Anna Oxa's presence at the event attracted particular media attention for her androgynous punk style and persona conceived by the artist Ivan Cattaneo. After the festival, all three of the winning songs achieved considerable commercial success, each reaching number one on Italian singles charts during the year.

==== First round ====
Qualified for the second round

First round – Solo artists – 28 January 1978
R/O	Song	Artist	Points	Place
1	"Domani, domani"	Laura Luca	24	3
2	"Anna Anna"	Donato Ciletti	21	4
3	"Ora"	Dora Moroni	15	5
4	"Armonia e poesia"	Santino Rocchetti	36	2
5	"Un'emozione da poco"	Anna Oxa	39	1

Detailed voting results of the first round – Solo artists
R/O	Song	Bari	Bologna	Florence	Venice	Genoa	Total
1	"Domani, domani"	6	3	5	6	4	24
2	"Anna Anna"	2	6	1	5	7	21
3	"Ora"	2	1	4	4	4	15
4	"Armonia e poesia"	9	8	8	6	5	36
5	"Un'emozione da poco"	8	9	9	6	7	39

First round – Groups – 28 January 1978
R/O	Song	Artist	Points	Place
1	"Il mio amore"	Schola Cantorum	37	2
2	"Soli"	Beans	26	4
3	"½ notte"	Daniel Sentacruz Ensemble	29	3
4	"...e dirsi ciao"	Matia Bazar	43	1

Detailed voting results of the first round – Groups
R/O	Song	Bari	Bologna	Florence	Genoa	Venice	Total
1	"Il mio amore"	6	7	8	7	9	37
2	"Soli"	6	6	4	5	5	26
3	"½ notte"	6	5	6	6	6	29
4	"...e dirsi ciao"	9	9	9	9	7	43

First round – Singer-songwriters – 28 January 1978
R/O	Song	Artist	Points	Place
1	"Tu sola"	Anselmo Genovese	26	3
2	"'N' addore 'e castagne"	Roberto Carrino	21	5
3	"Quando Teresa verrà"	Marco Ferradini	23	4
4	"Gianna"	Rino Gaetano	38	1
5	"Il buio e tu"	Ciro Sebastianelli	27	2

Detailed voting results of the first round – Singer-songwriters
R/O	Song	Bari	Bologna	Florence	Genoa	Venice	Total
1	"Tu sola"	2	4	7	7	6	26
2	"'N' addore 'e castagne"	8	4	2	3	4	21
3	"Quando Teresa verrà"		6	5	4	8	23
4	"Gianna"	9	7	9	7	6	38
5	"Il buio e tu"	8	6	4	6	3	27

==== Second round ====
Winner

Second round – Solo artists – 28 January 1978
R/O	Song	Artist	Points	Place	Rank
1	"Domani, domani"	Laura Luca	4	3	8
2	"Armonia e poesia"	Santino Rocchetti	11	2	6
3	"Un'emozione da poco"	Anna Oxa	30	1	2

Second round – Groups – 28 January 1978
R/O	Song	Artist	Points	Place	Rank
1	"Il mio amore"	Schola Cantorum	9	2	7
2	"½ notte"	Daniel Sentacruz Ensemble	2	3	9
3	"...e dirsi ciao"	Matia Bazar	34	1	1

Second round – Singer-songwriters – 28 January 1978
R/O	Song	Artist	Points	Place	Rank
1	"Tu sola"	Anselmo Genovese	12	3	5
2	"Gianna"	Rino Gaetano	17	1	3
3	"Il buio e tu"	Ciro Sebastianelli	16	2	4

== Other awards ==
=== Sanremo Verifica ===
After the festival, a vote organised by Vittorio Salvetti in collaboration with eleven newspapers (Note: Announced as fourteen newspapers during the festival's final, as was originally intended) was held between 30 January and 4 February titled Sanremo Verifica, in which newspaper readers were able to fill out ballots indicating their favourite of the festival's competing songs. It was presented as a way for the public to express their opinion by either affirming or rejecting the festival's outcome, with the voting results from each newspaper added together to form a new ranking. Salvetti revealed the results at a press conference in Milan on 13 February. The winner was "Gianna" performed by Rino Gaetano, followed by "Un'emozione da poco" performed by Anna Oxa and "Domani, domani" performed by Laura Luca. The festival's overall winners, Matia Bazar, finished in sixth place.

== Broadcasts ==
=== Local broadcast ===
Sanremo Anteprima was broadcast on 27 January on Rete Uno beginning at 19:00 CET and on Rai Radio 1 beginning at 19:45 CET. The final night was broadcast live on both Rete Uno and Rai Radio 1 beginning at 20:40 CET on 28 January. The Galà delle Nazioni was broadcast on Rai Radio 1 beginning at 19:35 CET on 17 February.

The final was broadcast on television in Italy to an estimated 20.8 million viewers, while Sanremo Anteprima was broadcast to an estimated 10.5 million viewers.

=== International broadcasts ===
The final was broadcast abroad via the Eurovision and Intervision networks, reportedly including broadcasters in Luxembourg, Yugoslavia, Greece, Turkey, Poland, the Soviet Union, Romania, Bulgaria and Czechoslovakia, as well as throughout South America, to an estimated global audience of 220 million. Known details on the broadcasts in each country, including the specific broadcasting stations and commentators are shown in the tables below.

International broadcasters of the Sanremo Music Festival 1978
Country	Broadcaster	Channel(s)	Commentator(s)	Ref(s)
Chile	UCTV	Canal 13 (Note: Delayed broadcast on 13 February at 21:30 (CLST))		
Chile	Radio Pudahuel			
Hungary	MTV	MTV1 (Note: Delayed broadcast on 7 March 1978 at 22:20 (CET))		
Venezuela	VTV	Canal 8		
