= ...e dirsi ciao =

Single by Matia Bazar
- B-side: "Ma che giornata strana"
- Released: February 1978
- Label: Ariston
- Songwriter(s): Giancarlo Golzi; Aldo Stellita; Antonella Ruggiero; Piero Cassano; Carlo Marrale
- Producer(s): Paolo Cattaneo

Matia Bazar singles chronology
"Mister Mandarino" (1978)	"...e dirsi ciao" (1978)	"Tu semplicità" (1978)

Audio
- "...e dirsi ciao" on YouTube

"...e dirsi ciao" (lit. '...And saying ciao') is a 1978 song composed and performed by the Italian pop group Matia Bazar. It won the 28th edition of the Sanremo Music Festival.

== Background ==
Often described as a minor song in the band's repertoire, the song marked the second participation of the band to the Sanremo Festival, one year after their debut with "Ma perchè". The band at the time was topping the charts with the single "Solo tu", and decided to take part in the competition against the will of the record company. The song has been described as "a sophisticated song, built on a slow bolero rhythm that explodes into a verse-less refrain". Matia bazar recorded a Spanish-language version of the song titled "Y decir, chao".

== Track listing ==
No.	Title	Length
1.	"...e dirsi ciao"	4:48
2.	"Ma che giornata strana"	4:44

== Charts ==
Chart (1978)	Peak position
Italy (Musica e dischi)	1
