= List of number-one hits of 1978 (Italy) =

This is a list of number-one songs in 1978 on the Italian charts compiled weekly by the Italian Hit Parade Singles Chart.

== Chart history ==
Issue date	Song	Artist(s)	Ref.
January 7	"Solo tu"	Matia Bazar	
January 14	"Solo tu"	Matia Bazar	
January 21	"Solo tu"	Matia Bazar	
January 28	"Solo tu"	Matia Bazar	
February 4	"Solo tu"	Matia Bazar	
February 11	"Solo tu"	Matia Bazar	
February 18	"Solo tu"	Matia Bazar	
February 25	"...e dirsi ciao"	Matia Bazar	
March 4	"...e dirsi ciao"	Matia Bazar	
March 11	"Gianna"	Rino Gaetano	
March 18	"Gianna"	Rino Gaetano	
March 25	"Gianna"	Rino Gaetano	
April 1	"Gianna"	Rino Gaetano	
April 8	"Un'emozione da poco"	Anna Oxa	
April 15	"Un'emozione da poco"	Anna Oxa	
April 22	"Un'emozione da poco"	Anna Oxa	
April 29	"Figli delle stelle"	Alan Sorrenti	
May 6	"Stayin' Alive"	Bee Gees	
May 13	"Stayin' Alive"	Bee Gees	
May 20	"Stayin' Alive"	Bee Gees	
May 27	"Stayin' Alive"	Bee Gees	
June 3	"Stayin' Alive"	Bee Gees	
June 10	"Stayin' Alive"	Bee Gees	
June 17	"Sotto il segno dei pesci"	Antonello Venditti	
June 24	"Stayin' Alive"	Bee Gees	
July 1	"Tu"	Umberto Tozzi	
July 8	"Tu"	Umberto Tozzi	
July 15	"Tu"	Umberto Tozzi	
July 22	"Tu"	Umberto Tozzi	
July 29	"Tu"	Umberto Tozzi	
August 5	"Tu"	Umberto Tozzi	
August 12	"Tu"	Umberto Tozzi	
August 19	"Tu"	Umberto Tozzi	
August 26	"Tu"	Umberto Tozzi	
September 2	"Tu"	Umberto Tozzi	
September 9	"Tu"	Umberto Tozzi	
September 16	"Tu"	Umberto Tozzi	
September 23	"Tu"	Umberto Tozzi	
September 30	"Ti avrò"	Adriano Celentano	
October 7	"Ti avrò"	Adriano Celentano	
October 14	"Wuthering Heights"	Kate Bush	
October 21	"Una donna per amico"	Lucio Battisti	
October 28	"Una donna per amico"	Lucio Battisti	
November 4	"Una donna per amico"	Lucio Battisti	
November 11	"Una donna per amico"	Lucio Battisti	
November 18	"Una donna per amico"	Lucio Battisti	
November 25	"Una donna per amico"	Lucio Battisti	
December 2	"Una donna per amico"	Lucio Battisti	
December 9	"Una donna per amico"	Lucio Battisti	
December 16	"Una donna per amico"	Lucio Battisti	
December 23	"Una donna per amico"	Lucio Battisti	
December 30	"Una donna per amico"	Lucio Battisti	

== Number-one artists ==
Position	Artist	Weeks #1
1	Umberto Tozzi	13
2	Lucio Battisti	11
3	Matia Bazar	9
4	Bee Gees	7
5	Rino Gaetano	4
6	Anna Oxa	3
7	Adriano Celentano	2
8	Alan Sorrenti	1
8	Antonello Venditti	1
8	Kate Bush	1
