= Melanchólia =

1985 studio album by Matia Bazar

Studio album by Matia Bazar
- Released: 1985
- Studio: Maison Blanche (Modena)
- Genre: Synth-pop; disco
- Length: 35:45
- Label: Ariston
- Producer: Maurizio Salvadori; Celso Valli; Roberto Colombo

Matia Bazar chronology
Aristocratica (1984)	Melanchólia (1985)	Melò (1987)

Singles from Melanchólia
- 1. "Souvenir" Released: 1985; 2. "Ti sento" Released: 1985

Melanchólia is the ninth studio album by the Italian pop band Matia Bazar, released in 1985.

== Track listing ==
Side one
No.	Title	Writer(s)	Length
1.	"Ti sento (I feel you, en France)"	Carlo Marrale; Aldo Stellita; Sergio Cossu	4:13
2.	"Via col vento"	Marrale; Cossu; Giancarlo Golzi; Marco Guzzetti	4:53
3.	"Cose"	Antonella Ruggiero; Marrale; Stellita	4:59
4.	"Da qui a..."	Stellita; Cossu; Guzzetti	4:01
Total length:			18:06

Side two
No.	Title	Writer(s)	Length
1.	"Fiumi di parole"	Marrale; Stellita; Cossu; Golzi	4:08
2.	"Amami"	Marrale; Stellita; Cossu	4:05
3.	"Angelina"	Ruggiero; Marrale; Stellita	4:52
4.	"Souvenir"	Marrale; Stellita; Cossu	4:34
Total length:			17:39

== Personnel ==
Matia Bazar

- Antonella Ruggiero – lead vocals
- Aldo Stellita – bass guitar
- Carlo Marrale – background vocals; guitar
- Sergio Cossu – keyboards
- Giancarlo Golzi – drums, percussion

Additional musicians

- Jacopo Jacopetti – saxophones
- Rudy Trevisi – saxophones on "Cose"

Production

- Maurizio Salvadori – producer
- Celso Valli – producer
- Roberto Costa – engineer, mixing

Artwork

- Studio Convertino – design
- Fred Greissing – photography

== Charts ==
Chart (1985–1986)	Peak position
Dutch Albums (Album Top 100)	4
Italian Albums (Musica e dischi)	5
Swedish Albums (Sverigetopplistan)	23
