= Silvia Mezzanotte =

Italian singer (born 1967)

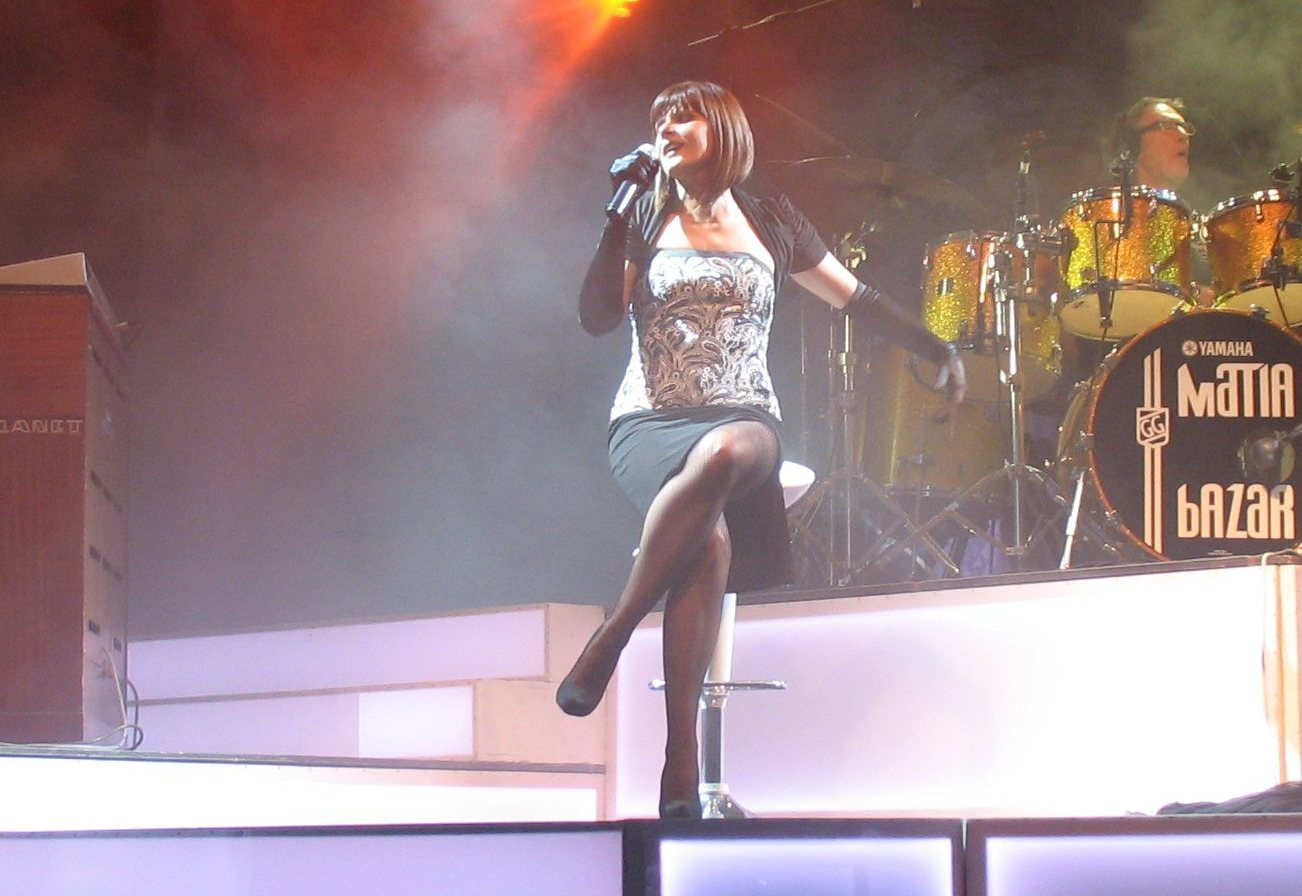
- Mezzanotte with Matia Bazar in 2011

Background information
- Born: 22 April 1967 (age 59); Bologna, Italy
- Genres: Pop
- Occupation: Singer
- Instrument: Vocals
- Years active: 1990–present

Silvia Mezzanotte (born 22 April 1967 in Bologna), is an Italian singer and song-writer.

== Early solo career ==
Mezzanotte debuted at the Sanremo Music Festival in 1990 with her song Sarai grande, reaching the 4th place in the Newcomers section.

In the following years she went on working as backing vocalist with artists such as Francesco De Gregori, Mia Martini and Laura Pausini.

== First stint with Matia Bazar ==
In 1999 Mezzanotte was invited to replace Laura Valente as the lead singer of Matia Bazar. During Mezzanotte's first tenure with the band, they took part in three subsequent editions of the Sanremo Music Festival: in 2000 (with Brivido caldo, reaching the 8th place), in 2001 (with Questa nostra grande storia d'amore, ranked #3) and 2002 with Messaggio d'amore, when they won the context. Following the success of Messaggio d'amore, the band embarked on a two-year-long World tour.

== Solo career ==
In 2004, Mezzanotte left the band to pursue a solo career. She released two albums to moderate commercial success, Il viaggio (2006) and Lunatica (2008).

== Reunion with Matia Bazar ==
In 2010, Matia Bazar's drummer Giancarlo Golzi put forward to Mezzanotte the idea of reuniting with the band. Mezzanotte officially re-joined Matia Bazar on the occasion of their new single, Gli occhi caldi di Sylvie.

In 2012, Matia Bazar entered the Sanremo Music Festival with the song Sei tu but failed to qualify for the final.

In August 2015, during the band's 40th anniversary tour, tragedy struck when drummer and founding member Giancarlo Golzi died of a sudden heart attack. Mezzanotte elected to leave the band in February 2016. Guitarist Piero Cassano left a few months later. As of 2025, Matia Bazar are stil active although no founding members are part of the band's current line-up.

== Recent years ==
In 2016, Mezzanotte took part in and won Tale e quale show (the Italian version of Sing Your Face Off and Your Face Sounds Familiar), impersonating several famous singers like Adele, Laura Pausini, Dalida and Mina.

In 2017 she releaesed a new album, 5.0. This was followed by her fourth solo album, Aspetta un attimo, in 2019.

In 2023 Mezzanotte teamed-up with Matia Bazar former guitarist and singer Carlo Marrale and embarked on a tour performing stripped-down versions of the band's material.

Since 2015, Mezzanotte has been giving singing lessons at her school, The Vocal Academy, in Mazara del Vallo.

== Discography ==
=== With Matia Bazar ===
- Brivido caldo (2000)
- Dolce canto (2001)
- Messaggi dal vivo (2002)
- Conseguenza logica (2011)
- Matia Bazar 40th anniversary celebration (2015)

=== Solo ===
- Il viaggio (2006)
- Lunatica (2008)
- 5.0 (2017)
- Aspetta un attimo (2019)
