= Tutti pazzi per amore =

Italian television series

- Genre: Romantic comedy
- Created by: Ivan Cotroneo
- Directed by: Riccardo Milani; Laura Muscardin
- Starring: Stefania Rocca; Antonia Liskova; Emilio Solfrizzi; Nicole Murgia; Brenno Placido; Laura Calgani; Carlotta Natoli; Neri Marcorè; Marina Rocco; Luca Angeletti; Piera Degli Esposti; Giuseppe Battiston; Sonia Bergamasco; Francesca Inaudi; Irene Ferri; Katie McGovern; Corrado Fortuna; Pietro Taricone
- Country of origin: Italy
- Original language: Italian
- No. of seasons: 3
- No. of episodes: 78

Original release
- Network: Rai 1
- Release: December 7, 2008 – January 1, 2012

Tutti pazzi per amore is an Italian romantic comedy television series that aired on Rai 1 from December 7, 2008 to January 1, 2012, consisting of three seasons.

The show is set in Rome and follows the love story between a single father, Paolo Giorgi, and a single mother, Laura Del Fiore, and the adventures of the extended family that originates from their relationship. The main characters are Paolo Giorgi and his daughter Cristina, Laura Del Fiore and her son Emanuele and her daughter Nina. Around these main characters develops the story of their grandparents, their uncles and aunts, their colleagues and friends.

== Soundtrack ==
=== First season ===
| Titolo | Autore |
|---|---|
| Fotoromanza | Gianna Nannini |
| Ti amo | Umberto Tozzi |
| Come saprei | Giorgia |
| Tristezza | Ornella Vanoni |
| Stasera che sera | Matia Bazar |
| Ragazzo fortunato | Jovanotti |
| Tango delle capinere | Bixio - Cherubini |
| Sere nere | Tiziano Ferro |
| Strani amori | Laura Pausini |
| ...E io tra di voi | Charles Aznavour |
| Un uomo, una donna | Francis Lai |
| Vacanze romane | Matia Bazar |
| Macho man | Village People |
| Cocktail d'amore | Stefania Rotolo |
| Solo tu | Matia Bazar |
| Libero | Domenico Modugno |
| La notte vola | Lorella Cuccarini |
| Non mi innamoro più | Catherine Spaak e Johnny Dorelli |
| Felicità | Albano e Romina |
| Buonasera dottore | Claudia Mori |
| È l'uomo per me | Mina |
| Bella | Jovanotti |
| E tu come stai | Claudio Baglioni |
| Più bella cosa | Eros Ramazzotti |
| Centro di gravità permanente | Franco Battiato |
| Mi manchi (live) | Fausto Leali |
| Disco samba | Two Man Sound |
| Nessuno mi può giudicare | Caterina Caselli |
| Noi ragazzi di oggi | Luis Miguel |
| Per un'ora d'amore | Matia Bazar |
| Solo tu | Matia Bazar |
| Mister Mandarino | Matia Bazar |
| Morirò d'amore | Giuni Russo |
| Stasera che sera | Matia Bazar |
| Mi manchi | Fausto Leali |

=== Second season ===
| Titolo | Autore |
|---|---|
| Amarti è l'immenso per me | Eros Ramazzotti & Antonella Bucci |
| Ballo ballo | Raffaella Carrà |
| Vacanze romane | Matia Bazar |
| Cheek to Cheek | Fred Astaire |
| Bye Bye Baby | Marilyn Monroe |
| Gold | Spandau Ballet |
| Gloria | Umberto Tozzi |
| Metti una sera a cena | Ennio Morricone |
| Adesso tu | Eros Ramazzotti |
| Alghero | Giuni Russo |
| Lamette | Donatella Rettore |
| Sabato pomeriggio | Claudio Baglioni |
| Sempre libera | Giuseppe Verdi; CANTANTE: Maria Callas |
| Cuore | Rita Pavone |
| Lady Marmalade | Labelle |
| I dubbi dell'amore | Fiorella Mannoia |
| Guapparia | Diego Giannini |
| Ascolta il tuo cuore | Laura Pausini |
| Tra te e il mare | Laura Pausini |
| Montagne verdi | Marcella Bella |
| Super SuperMan | Miguel Bosé |
| Quando nasce un amore | Anna Oxa |
| Allocco tra gli angeli | Ghigo |
| Single Ladies | Beyoncé |
| In ginocchio da te | Gianni Morandi |
| Il mare d'inverno | Loredana Bertè |
| Tango delle capinere | Raoul Casadei |
| Via | Claudio Baglioni |
| La stagione dell'amore | Franco Battiato |
| Io che amo solo te | Sergio Endrigo |
| Parole parole parole | Mina |
| Solo tu | Matia Bazar |
| Ti lascerò | Fausto Leali & Anna Oxa |
| Say Shava Shava | Tratta dal film Kabhi Khushi Kabhie Gham |
| Love Is in the Air | John Paul Young |

=== Third season ===
In this season the songs are sung by the actors.

| Titolo | Autore |
|---|---|
| We Are Family | Sister Sledge |
| Che m'importa del mondo | Rita Pavone |
| E dimmi che non vuoi morire | Patty Pravo |
| Alla mia età | Rita Pavone |
| Qui e là | Patty Pravo |
| Il tempo se ne va | Adriano Celentano |
| Avrai | Claudio Baglioni |
| Simpatica sei tu | Nicola Arigliano |
| Donna | Quartetto Cetra |
| Confusa e felice | Carmen Consoli |
| Soldi | Betty Curtis |
| Kobra | Donatella Rettore |
| La Notte | Salvatore Adamo |
| Un senso | Vasco Rossi |
| Non ho l'età | Gigliola Cinquetti |
| Fortissimo | Rita Pavone |
| Paradise | Phoebe Cates |
| Minuetto | Mia Martini |
| Prima di partire per un lungo viaggio | Irene Grandi |
| Senza pietà | Anna Oxa |
| Uomini soli | Pooh |
| Eternità | Camaleonti |
| Perdere l'amore | Massimo Ranieri |
| Se perdo te | Patty Pravo |
| Che sarà | Ricchi e Poveri |
| Azzurro | Adriano Celentano |

== Impact and reception ==
=== Awards ===
In 2009 Tutti Pazzi Per Amore has won the Premio Regia Televisiva in the category best fiction. For her portrayal of Lea, the actress Sonia Bergamasco has received the prize for best actress in a supporting role at the RomaFictionFest 2009.

== See also ==
- List of Italian television series
