= Sanremo Music Festival 1983 =

Italian song contest (33rd edition)

Dates and venue
- Semi-final 1: 3 February 1983
- Semi-final 2: 4 February 1983
- Final: 5 February 1983
- Venue: Teatro Ariston; Sanremo, Italy

Production
- Broadcaster: Radiotelevisione italiana (RAI)
- Director: Eros Macchi
- Presenters: Andrea Giordana, Isabel Russinova, Anna Pettinelli, Emanuela Falcetti

Vote
- Number of entries: 36
- Winner: "Sarà quel che sarà" Tiziana Rivale

The Sanremo Music Festival 1983 (Italian: Festival di Sanremo 1983), officially the 33rd Italian Song Festival (33º Festival della canzone italiana), was the 33rd annual Sanremo Music Festival, held at the Teatro Ariston in Sanremo between 3 and 5 February 1983 and broadcast by Radiotelevisione italiana (RAI). The show was hosted by the actor Andrea Giordana, assisted by the trio of presenters of the musical show Discoring, Isabel Russinova, Anna Pettinelli, Emanuela Falcetti. Daniele Piombi and Roberta Manfredi hosted the segments from the Sanremo Casino, where a number of foreign guests performed.

The winner of the festival was Tiziana Rivale with the song "Sarà quel che sarà", while Matia Bazar won the Critics Award with "Vacanze romane".

== Participants and results ==
Big Artists section
Song	Artist(s)	Songwriter(s)	Rank
"Sarà quel che sarà"	Tiziana Rivale	Roberto Ferri; Maurizio Fabrizio	1
"Volevo dirti"	Donatella Milani	Donatella Milani; Daniele Pace; Adelmo Fornaciari	2
"Margherita non lo sa"	Dori Ghezzi	Oscar Prudente; Oscar Avogadro	3
"Vacanze romane"	Matia Bazar	Carlo Marrale; Giancarlo Golzi	4 / Critics Award
"L’italiano"	Toto Cutugno	Cristiano Minellono; Toto Cutugno	5
"Oramai"	Fiordaliso	Claudio Daiano; Angelo Valsiglio; Depsa	6
"Complimenti"	Stefano Sani	Luigi Albertelli; Adelmo Fornaciari	7
"La mia nemica amatissima"	Gianni Morandi	Mogol; Gianni Bella; Gianni Morandi	8
"Working Late Tonight"	Amii Stewart	Mario Capuano; Giosy Capuano; Simon Boswell	9
"È la vita"	Marco Armani	Marco Armenise; Paolo Armenise	10
"Shalom"	Giuseppe Cionfoli	Giuseppe Cionfoli	11
"Avrò"	Giorgia Fiorio	Sergio Menegale; Raffaele Ferrato; Piero Soffici	12
"Casco blu"	Flavia Fortunato	Massimiliano Di Carlo; Paolo Masala; Elio Palumbo; Marcello Ramoino	13
"Eterna malattia"	Bertín Osborne	Enzo Malepasso; Luigi Albertelli	14
"Amare te"	Riccardo Azzurri	Riccardo Azzurri	15
"Primavera"	Sandro Giacobbe	Sandro Giacobbe; Luigi Albertelli	16
"Abbracciami amore mio"	Christian	Mario Balducci	17
"Una catastrofe bionda"	Marco Ferradini	Roberto Giuliani; Marco Ferradini; Cheope	18
"Stiamo insieme"	Richard Sanderson	Adelmo Fornaciari	19
"Nuvola"	Zucchero	Adelmo Fornaciari	20
"Mi sono innamorato di mia moglie"	Gianni Nazzaro	Daniele Pace; Michele Russo	21
"Notte e giorno"	Barbara Boncompagni	Daniele Pace; Angelo Valsiglio	22
"Movie Star"	Passengers	Celso Valli; Angelo Piccarreda	23
"Arriva arriva"	Viola Valentino	Maurizio Fabrizio; Vincenzo Spampinato	24
"Vita spericolata"	Vasco Rossi	Vasco Rossi e Tullio Ferro	25
"Cieli azzurri"	Pupo	Enzo Ghinazzi; Stefano Saturnini	26
"Dammi tanto amore"	Daniela Goggi	Maurizio Bassi; Enzo Ghinazzi	Eliminated
"Donna sola"	Pinot	Ivano Michetti	Eliminated
"E la neve scende"	Brunella Borciani	Luigi Albertelli; Adelmo Fornaciari	Eliminated
"Fammi volare"	Patrizia Danzi	Cavaros; Michele Violante	Eliminated
"Il mio treno"	Gloriana	Silvio Subelli; Giancarlo Nisi; Guido Natili; Silvio Aloisio; Fabio Anfuso	Eliminated
"Nuovo amore"	Nino Buonocore	Nino Buonocore	Eliminated
"Oppio"	Sibilla	Franco Battiato; Giusto Pio; Mostert	Eliminated
"Scatole cinesi"	Alessio Colombini	Adelio Cogliati; Alessio Colombini	Eliminated
"Solo con te"	Manuele Pepe	Manuele Pepe	Eliminated
"1950"	Amedeo Minghi	Gaio Chiocchio; Amedeo Minghi	Eliminated

== Broadcasts ==
=== Local broadcast ===
All shows were broadcast live on Rete Uno.

=== International broadcast ===
Known details on the broadcasts in each country, including the specific broadcasting stations and commentators are shown in the tables below.

International broadcasters of the Sanremo Music Festival 1983
Country	Broadcaster	Channel(s)	Commentator(s)	Ref(s)
Yugoslavia	JRT	TV Beograd 1, TV Zagreb 1		
