= Solo tu (disambiguation) =

"Solo tu" is a 1977 song by Matia Bazar.

"Solo tu" or "Sólo tú" may also refer to:

- "Solo tu", a 1965 song by Rita Pavone
- "Sólo tú", a 1976 song by Camilo Sesto
- Sólo tú", a 1997 song by Grupo Exterminador
- "Sólo tú", a 1999 song by Jací Velásquez from the album Llegar a ti
- "Sólo tú", a 2009 song by Sergio Vallín
- "Sólo tú", a 2014 song by Zion & Lennox
- "Sólo tú", a 2019 song by Akon from the album El Negreeto

== See also ==
- "Tú, sólo tú", song by Selena
