= Vacanze romane =

Single by Matia Bazar

from the album Tango
- B-side: "Palestina"
- Released: February 1983
- Label: Ariston Music
- Songwriter(s): Aldo Stellita, Carlo Marrale
- Producer(s): Roberto Colombo

Matia Bazar singles chronology
"Fantasia" (1982)	"Vacanze romane" (1983)	"Aristocratica" (1984)

Audio
- "Vacanze romane" on YouTube

"Vacanze romane" (transl. "Roman holidays") is a 1983 single composed by Aldo Stellita (lyrics, even if credited to Giancarlo Golzi) and Carlo Marrale (music) and performed by Matia Bazar. The song premiered at the 33rd edition of the Sanremo Music Festival, where it ranked fourth, winning the critic's award. It eventually became one of the band's signature songs.

== Background ==
The band, which in 1981 had undergone the first line-up change in its history with the departure of Piero Cassano and the entry of Mauro Sabbione, starting from the 1982 album ...Berlino ...Parigi ...Londra had turned its style towards a decidedly electro-pop sound, with tepid reception from critics and public alike. Eager for a relaunch, they decided to participate in the Sanremo Music Festival (already won by the band in 1978), but their first choice, "Palestina" ("Palestine"), was rejected on political grounds. They then opted for "Vacanze romane", a song characterized by the meeting of apparently antithetical sound elements, i.e. the classical melody and the retro feel given by Antonella Ruggiero's vocal performance versus the electronic arrangements.

== Lyrics ==
Starting from its title (a reference to the 1953 William Wyler's film Roman Holiday) the song is a melancholic hommage to Rome, from the point of view of the unmatched splendour it had reached and that had lost through the time.

== Track listing ==
- 7" single (AR/00943)
1. "Vacanze romane" (Aldo Stellita, Carlo Marrale)
2. "Palestina" (Mauro Sabbione, Aldo Stellita)

== Charts ==
Chart	Peak position
Italy (Musica e dischi)	1
