= Roberta Faccani =

Italian singer and actress

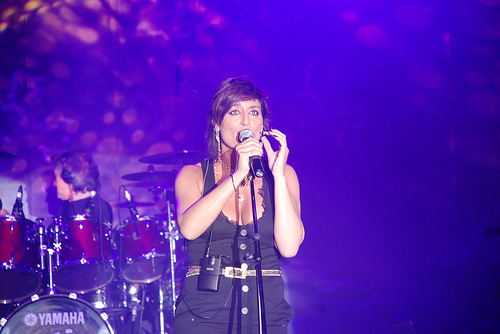
- Faccani singing with Matia Bazar in 2007

Background information
- Also known as: Mata
- Born: 1 July 1968 (age 58); Ancona, Italy
- Genre: Pop rock
- Occupations: Singer; songwriter; actress
- Instrument: Vocals
- Years active: 1989–present
- Formerly of: Matia Bazar (2004–2010)

Roberta Faccani (born 1 July 1968) is an Italian singer and actress.

== Early career ==
After placing second at the Castrocaro Music Festival in 1990, Faccani studied at the Centro Europeo di Toscolano (C.E.T.) led by famed lyricist Mogol, graduating in 1995.

In 2001, she released her first single, Rido, under the stage name Mata Faccani.

A musical theatre actress, Faccani played the role of Joanne in the Italian production of Rent from 1999 to 2000, before being cast in Pinocchio il grande musical, directed by Saverio Marconi with music by Pooh in 2002.

== With Matia Bazar ==
In late 2004 Roberta replaced Silvia Mezzanotte as the lead singer of the famed group Matia Bazar, after signing a five-year contract; her first album with the band was Profili svelati (2005), preceded by the single Grido d'amore which earned the band the third place in the Group section at the Sanremo Music Festival 2005.

Two albums revisiting Matia Bazar's earlier repertoire, One1 Two2 Three3 Four4 (2007) and One1 Two2 Three3 Four4 – Volume 2, followed; on 29 April 2010, Faccani departed from the group due to the expiry of her contract.

== Later solo career ==
After leaving Matia Bazar, Faccani resumed her career as a musical theatre actress. In 2007, she wrote lyrics and music (with composer Stefano Calabrese) for Streghe, un musical magico, while in 2010–11 she performed as the Queen of Hearts in Alice nel Paese delle Meraviglie – Il musical, to rave reviews.

Other highlights of Roberta's acting career are her roles as Lady Montague in the Italian adaptation of Roméo et Juliette (from 2013 to 2015 and again in 2018) and as Life and Death (double role) in Renato Zero's play Zerovskij, Solo per amore (2017).

Apart from acting, Faccani released three solo albums, Un po' matt(i)a, un po' no…controtempo live tour (live, 2012), Stato di grazia (2013) and Matrioska italiana (2017), performing at several venues with her group, Mataband.

== Other activities ==
In 2013, Faccani founded her music academy in Castelplanio, La fabbrica del cantante-attore, and a recording label, Bandidos Records (with Giordano Tittarelli), under which she released the single Lazio Generazione (2014) as a tribute to the football team managed by her late grand-uncle Augusto Faccani.

On 28 November 2014, she sang for Pope Francis in Rome before a worldwide audience during the Terram in pacis event.

== Discography ==
=== With Matia Bazar ===
- Profili svelati (2005)
- One1 Two2 Three3 Four4 (2007)
- One1 Two2 Three3 Four4 – Volume 2 (2008)

=== Solo ===
- Un po' matt(i)a, un po' no…controtempo live tour (live, 2012)
- Stato di grazia (2013)
- Matrioska italiana (2017)
