= Museo Rosenbach =

Italian progressive rock band

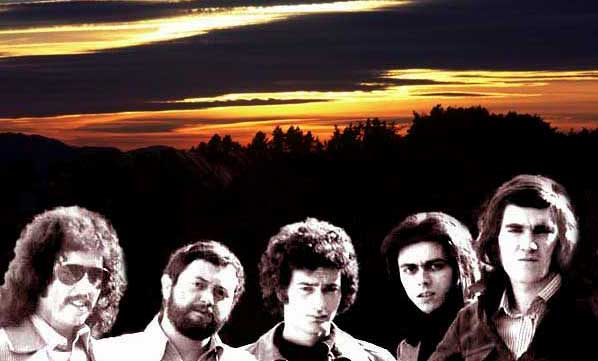
- Museo Rosenbach in the 1970s.

Background information
- Origin: Bordighera, Italy
- Genres: Italian progressive rock
- Years active: 1971–1974, 1999–present
- Labels: Dischi, BMG, Carisch, Musea
- Members: Giancarlo Golzi; Alberto Moreno; Stefano "Lupo" Galifi; Andy Senis; Fabio Meggetto; Max Borelli; Sandro Libra
- Past members: Andrea Pavan; Sergio Cossu; Pit Corradi; Stefano Galifi; Enzo Merogno

Museo Rosenbach are an Italian progressive rock band whose album Zarathustra, in spite of the limited success it scored in the 1970s, is today considered a cornerstone of the genre.

== History ==
Museo Rosenbach were formed around 1971 as Inaugurazione del Museo Rosenbach ("The Inauguration of Rosenbach Museum") when two bands, La Quinta Strada and Il Sistema joined forces. La Quinta Strada and Il Sistema had played mostly songs by other popular artists like Jimi Hendrix and rock groups such as The Kinks, The Animals and Steppenwolf and by Rhythm & Blues stars like Otis Redding and Wilson Pickett.

The band name may have been inspired by Premiata Forneria Marconi and Banco del Mutuo Soccorso. If these other bands had named themselves after a bakery and a bank, the band thought it was reasonable to create a "Museum" dedicated to the German publisher Otto Rosenbach. Other possible inspirations for the name may have come from the eclectic collections of the Rosenbach Museum & Library in Philadelphia, Pennsylvania, or simply the poetic name "Rosenbach", which means "brook of roses" in German.

Influenced by Pink Floyd and Banco del Mutuo Soccorso (among others), Museo Rosenbach released their first and most well-known album Zarathustra in April 1973. The songs on Zarathustra displayed the influence of classical music and the heavy keyboard passages (synthesizer, mellotron and Hammond organ) typical of other Italian progressive rock groups of the time and of progressive rock in general. Vocalist Stefano Galifi's distinctive voice and keyboard player Pit Corradi added originality to the band sound.

The band provoked controversy for their supposed right-wing inclinations stemming from the image of Mussolini found in the collage on the album cover, and the Nietzsche-inspired lyrics.

Drummer Giancarlo Golzi later joined the pop band Matia Bazar.

In the early 1990s Alberto Moreno, the bass player and founder of the Museo, proposed a new album to Giancarlo Golzi, made of totally new tracks. Merogno, Galifi and Corradi did not join in. In 2000, the band released the concept album EXIT with Marco Balbo (guitar), Marioluca Bariona (keyboards) and Andrea Biancheri (vocals).

In 2002, the Museo accepted the offer from the Finnish magazine "Colossus" to participate to the transposition in rock music of the poem Kalevala. The same band members from the album Exit with a new member, Andrea Pavan (bass), recorded the short suite "Fiore di vendetta".

In 2012, Moreno and Golzi were joined by Galifi, singer of the 1970s' band, guitarists Max Borelli and Sandro Libra, and keyboardist Fabio Meggetto. Moreno worked at mellotron and synthesizer sounds, leaving the bassist role to Andy Senis. This band released the album Zarathustra – Live in studio in October 2012. April 2013: Museo Rosenbach played for the first time the new concept album Barbarica, in Tokyo, at the "Italian Progressive Festival". From this performance, in March 2014 the band released the live album Live In Tokyo.

== Lineups ==
=== 1973 lineup ===
- Stefano Galifi – vocals
- Enzo Merogno – guitar, vocals
- Pit Corradi – keyboards
- Alberto Moreno – bass, piano, mellotron
- Giancarlo Golzi – drums, percussion, vocals

=== Current lineup ===
- Alberto Moreno – bass and mellotron
- Giancarlo Golzi – drums
- Stefano Galifi – lead vocals
- Andy Senis – bass, vocals
- Fabio Meggetto – keyboards
- Max Borelli – guitar
- Sandro Libra – guitar

== Discography ==
- Zarathustra (1973)
- Live '72 (1992 – live)
- Rare and Unreleased (1992 – demos and some previously unreleased tracks)
- Rarities (1992 – same as the previous entry)
- Exit (2000)
- "Fiore di Vendetta" song in Kalevala (2003)
- Zarathustra Live in Studio (04-12-2012 – with then-new lineup)
- Barbarica (2013)
- Live in Tokyo (2014)
