= Da Manuela a Pensami =

Compilation album by Julio Iglesias
- Released: 1978
- Length: 70:11

Da Manuela a Pensami is a 1978 compilation album by Spanish singer Julio Iglesias. It contains a collection of songs from Iglesias' previous three albums: Manuela (1975), Se mi lasci non vale (1976) and Sono un pirata, sono un signore (1978). The album was certified platinum by the Federation of the Italian Music Industry.

== Track listing ==
1. Manuela (Italian) – 3:21
2. Da quando sei tornata – 3:04
3. Bimba – 4:00
4. Quella di sempre – 3:28
5. Caminito – 3:32
6. Se mi lasci non vale – 3:00
7. A Eleonora perchè è un fiore – 4:00
8. Anima ribelle – 3:16
9. Non rimane che un addio – 3:34
10. Solamente una vez – 3:37
11. Sono un pirata, sono un signore – 3:00
12. Un amore a matita – 3:02
13. Restiamo ancora insieme – 4:07
14. Passar di mano – 3:42
15. Guantanamera – 3:45
16. Pensami – 4:04
17. Piccole grandi cose – 3:41
18. La ragazza di Ypacarai – 3:59
19. Quel punto in più – 2:52
20. De un mundo raro – 3:12

== Certifications ==
| Region | Certification | Certified units/sales |
|---|---|---|
| Italy (FIMI) since 2009 | Platinum | 50,000^{‡} |
^{‡} Sales+streaming figures based on certification alone.
