= Gazosa =

- Origin: Rome, Italy
- Genres: Pop-rock
- Years active: 1998–2003; 2009–2010; 2022–present
- Labels: Sugar Music; Universal Music Group
- Members: Vincenzo Siani; Federico Paciotti; Valentina Paciotti
- Past members: Jessica Morlacchi

Gazosa (Italian pronunciation: [ɡadˈdzoːza, -oːsa]; denoting a type of fizzy drink) are an Italian musical group which started as a teen band, best known for the song "www.mipiacitu".

== Career ==
The band formed in 1998 as Eta Beta and then Zeta Beta, and originally consisted of Jessica Morlacchi (b. 1987, vocalist and bass guitar), Vincenzo Siani (b. 1986, drums), and the brothers Federico Paciotti (b. 1987, guitar) and Valentina Paciotti (b. 1985, keyboards). Put under contract by Caterina Caselli, they made their official debut in 1999, with the ABBA cover "Mamma Mia". Their self-titled debut album was released in 2000 and it mixed new songs and covers.

In 2001, the band entered the 51st edition of the Sanremo Music Festival and won the newcomers' competition with the song "Stai con me (Forever)". In the summer they got a large commercial success with "www.mipiacitu", which became theme song of a series of Omnitel commercials and peaked at the fourth place on the Italian hit parade. In 2002, the group returned to the Sanremo Festival, this time competing in the Big Artists section, and placed tenth with the song "Ogni giorno di più". After releasing a cover version of Caselli's "Nessuno mi può giudicare", the group disbanded in 2003, with Jessica Morlacchi and Federico Paciotti starting their solo careers.

In 2009, the musical project was briefly restarted, being active only in live events. After disbanding once again in 2010, the band reunited (except for Morlacchi) in 2022.

== Discography ==
=== Albums ===
- 2000 – Gazosa
- 2001 – www.mipiacitu
- 2002 – Inseparabili
- 2022 – Gentleman

=== Singles ===
- 1999 – "Mamma Mia"
- 2001 – "Stai con me (Forever)"
- 2001 – "www.mipiacitu"
- 2002 – "Ogni giorno di più"
- 2003 – "Nessuno mi può giudicare" (ft. Tormento)
- 2022 – "L'italiano"
- 2022 – "Gentleman"

Awards and achievements
Preceded by Jenny B with "Semplice sai"	Sanremo Music Festival; Winner (Newcomers section); 2001	Succeeded by Anna Tatangelo with "Doppiamente fragili"
