= Sarà quel che sarà =

Single by Tiziana Rivale

from the album Sarà quel che sarà
- Released: February 1983
- Genre: Pop
- Length: 3:24
- Label: WEA
- Songwriters: Maurizio Fabrizio; Roberto Ferri

Tiziana Rivale singles chronology
"L'amore va" (1982)	"Sarà quel che sarà" (1983)	"Questo mondo è una baracca" (1983)

Audio
- "Sarà quel che sarà" on YouTube

"Sarà quel che sarà" (transl. "It will be what it will be") is a 1983 Italian song composed by Maurizio Fabrizio and Roberto Ferri and performed by Tiziana Rivale.

This song won the 33rd edition of the Sanremo Music Festival. The victory was so unexpected that Rivale did not yet had an album ready for release and her record company WEA had produced only 3,000 copies of the single.

The song has been described as "composed entirely with innovative synthetic textures that highlight Caribbean-tinged verses, that explodes into an anthem-style chorus, whose epic tones emerge through martial rhythms and the clever use of electric guitar".

== Track listing ==
No.	Title	Writer(s)	Length
1.	"Sarà quel che sarà"	Maurizio Fabrizio, Roberto Ferri	3:24
2.	"Serenade"	Claudio Gizzi, Tiziana Rivale	2:41

== Charts ==
Chart (1983)	Peak position
Italy (Musica e dischi)	5
