= Marina Donato =

Italian television producer and author (1949–2025)

Marina Donato (4 July 1949 – 30 July 2025) was an Italian television producer and author.

== Life and career ==
Donato was born in Rome on 4 July 1949. She was the producer of the television program La Corrida and as of 2002, was its director. Throughout her career, she worked on a number of television shows, including Ciao gente! (1983), Sì o no? (1993), Il gatto e la volpe (1997) and Forum (2008–2025).

She was married to Italian television host Corrado Mantoni.

Donato died on 30 July 2025, at the age of 76.
