= Se mi lasci non vale (film) =

2016 Italian comedy film

- Theatrical Release Poster
- Directed by: Vincenzo Salemme
- Written by: Martino Coli; Paolo Genovese; Vincenzo Salemme
- Produced by: Federica Lucisano; Fulvio Lucisano
- Starring: Vincenzo Salemme; Paolo Calabresi; Carlo Buccirosso; Serena Autieri; Tosca D'Aquino; Carlo Giuffrè
- Cinematography: Alessandro Pesci
- Edited by: Patrizio Marone
- Music by: Antonio Boccia
- Production companies: Italian International Film; Warner Bros. Entertainment Italia
- Distributed by: Warner Bros. Pictures
- Release date: 21 January 2016
- Country: Italy
- Language: Italian
- Box office: $2.4 million

Se mi lasci non vale is a 2016 Italian comedy film directed by Vincenzo Salemme. The film was released on January 21, 2016, by Warner Bros. Pictures. It was titled after a popular 1976 song by Julio Iglesias.

== Cast ==
- Vincenzo Salemme as Vincenzo
- Carlo Buccirosso as Alberto
- Paolo Calabresi as Paolo
- Serena Autieri as Sara
- Tosca D'Aquino as Federica
- Carlo Giuffrè as Paolo's Father
- Domenico Aria as Stage Actor
- Veronica Mazza as Mara
- Rosa Miranda as Stage Actress
- Ciro Capano as Theatre Director
