= Teorema (song) =

Song by Marco Ferradini

from the album Schiavo senza catene
- Released: 1981
- Genre: Pop
- Length: 4:53
- Label: Spaghetti Records
- Songwriter(s): Marco Ferradini, Herbert Pagani
- Producer(s): Alessandro Colombini

Audio
- "Teorema" on YouTube

"Teorema" (transl. "Theorem") is a 1981 Italian song composed by Marco Ferradini and Herbert Pagani and performed by Marco Ferradini. It is part of his 1981 EP Schiavo senza catene.

== Overview ==
The song was composed by Ferradini and Pagani in September 1980, in the mountain village of Macugnaga, at the base of Monte Rosa. The song's opening include a citation of Christopher Cross' "Sailing", which Ferradini intended as an hommage to the trip in the United States he made the same year. It is part of the concept EP Schiavo senza catene, which recounts a painful breakup, loosely based on the one Ferradini had recently experienced. Producer Alessandro Colombini was initially skeptic about the song, to the point that he tried to not include it in the tracklist.

Initially Ferradini promoted the EP with the title song "Schiavo senza catene", with whom he took part in Un disco per l'estate and Festivalbar, gathering lukewarm results. In October 1981, Ferradini was a guest in the Rai 1 show Domenica in, in which he performed a fragment of "Teorema"; since then, gradually, radio stations began playing up the track, driving EP sales and turning it into both a classic and Ferradini's signature song. In a 2025 interview, reflecting on the song's success, Ferradini said that "it solved my life".

The song was featured prominently in the Aldo, Giovanni e Giacomo's comedy film Ask Me If I'm Happy. In 1993, Mina recorded the song for the album Lochness. Artists who recorded the song also include Spagna, Wilma De Angelis, Fiorello and Giorgia.

== Certifications ==
| Region | Certification | Certified units/sales |
|---|---|---|
| Italy (FIMI) Sales from 2009 | Gold | 50,000^{‡} |
^{‡} Sales+streaming figures based on certification alone.
