= Piero Cassano =

Italian musician and composer

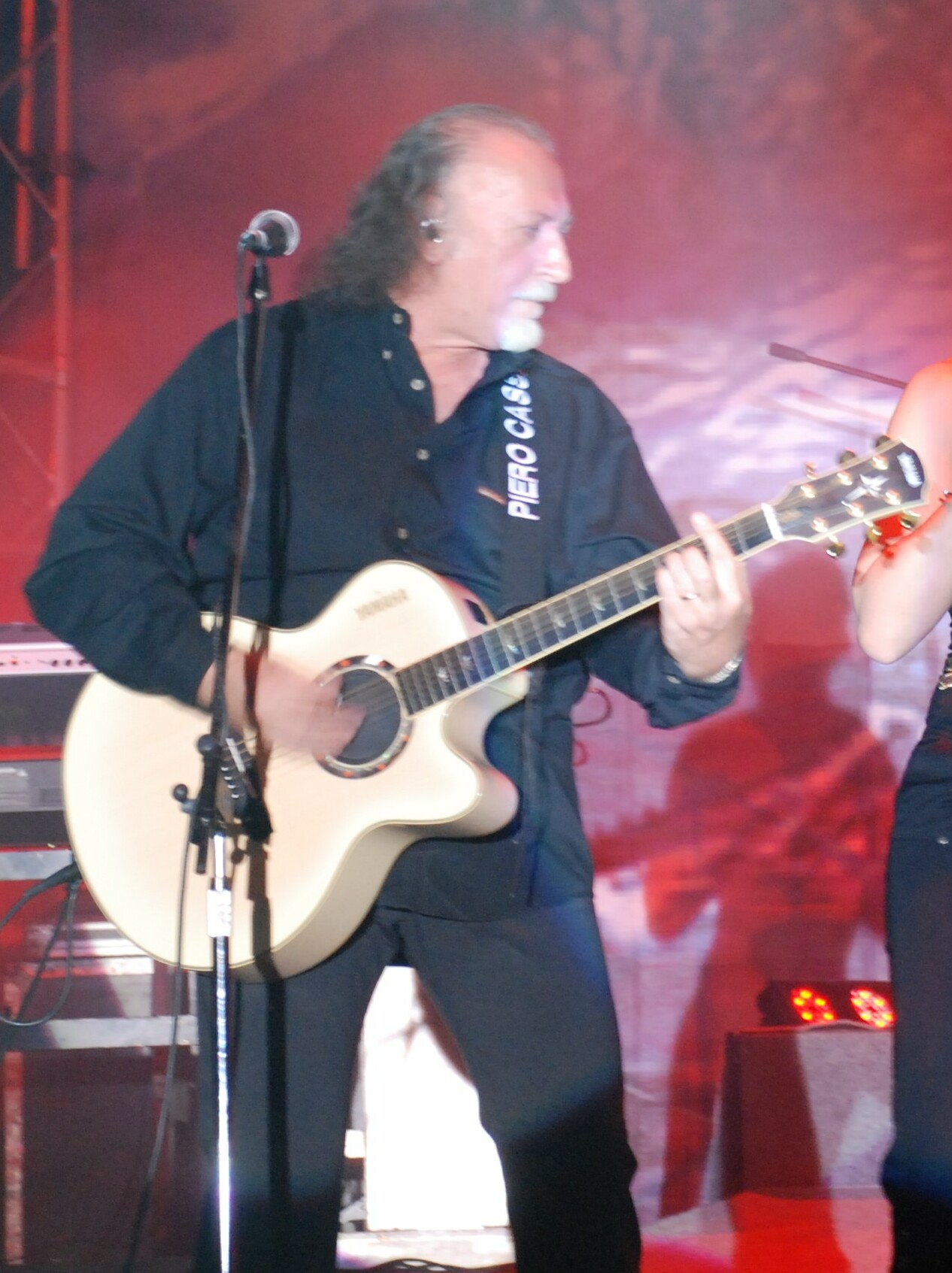
- Cassano in 2007

Background information
- Born: 13 September 1948 (age 77); Genoa, Italy
- Genres: Synth pop, prog rock, pop rock
- Occupations: Musician, composer, singer
- Instruments: Keyboards, guitar
- Years active: 1971–present

Piero Cassano (born 13 September 1948) is an Italian keyboardist, singer and composer, a founding member of the Genoan band Matia Bazar.

== Early career and Jet ==
Cassano started playing the piano at a young age. In 1971 he founded the progressive rock band JET with fellow musicians Aldo Stellita and Carlo Marrale. The band released an album, Fede, speranza, carità and unsuccessfully participated to the Sanremo Music Festival 1973 with the song Anika na-o.

== Matia Bazar: first stint ==
In 1975 vocalist Antonella Ruggiero and drummer Giancarlo Golzi joined Jet, resulting in a new band: Matia Bazar. In a six-year span, Cassano composed many of their hits, namely Stasera...che sera! (1975), Per un'ora d'amore (1975), Cavallo bianco (1975), Solo tu (1977), ...e dirsi ciao – the winning song of the Sanremo Music Festival 1978, Raggio di luna (the Italian entry for the Eurovision Song Contest 1979) and C'è tutto un mondo intorno (1979).

In 1981 Cassano decided to leave Matia Bazar to pursue other projects.

== As a composer and producer ==
In 1983, Cassano started a collaboration with lyricist Adelio Cogliati. Together, they helped launch newcomer Eros Ramazzotti, writing for him hits like Una storia importante, Adesso tu, Questo mio vivere un po' fuori, Musica è, Ti sposerò perché, Ciao pà, Cose della vita from 1985 to 1993.

Cassano also collaborated with many other Italian and international artists like Anna Oxa, Laura Bono, Mina, Milva, Fausto Leali, Demis Roussos, Ginette Reno, Mireille Mathieu, Mocedades, Sergio Dalma.

He also composed the Italian openings of several popular anime, notably Little Pollon and Sailor Moon, sung by Cristina D'Avena.

== Second stint with Matia Bazar ==
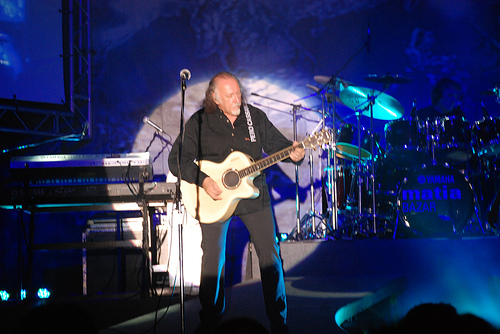
Piero Cassano performing with Matia Bazar, 2007

In 2000 Cassano rejoined Matia Bazar, releasing six more studio albums and taking part in five editions of the Sanremo Music Festival: in 2000 (with Brivido caldo, reaching the 8th place), in 2001 (with Questa nostra grande storia d'amore, ranked #3) and in 2002, this time winning the contest with Messaggio d'amore; then again in 2005 (with Grido d'amore, #3) and finally in 2012 (with Sei tu, which failed to qualify for the finals).

Following a long hiatus due to bandmate Giancarlo Golzi's unexpected death in 2015, Cassano left the band again in May 2017.

== Discography ==
=== With Jet ===
- Fede, speranza, carità (1972)

=== With Matia Bazar ===
- Matia Bazar 1 (1976)
- Gran Bazar (1977)
- Semplicità (1978)
- Tournée (1979)
- Il tempo del sole (1980)
- Brivido caldo (2000)
- Dolce canto (2001)
- Profili svelati (2005)
- One1 Two2 Three3 Four4 (2007)
- One1 Two2 Three3 Four4 – Volume 2 (2008)
- Conseguenza logica (2011)
