= Sanremo Music Festival 2001 =

Italian song contest (51st edition)

Dates and venue
- Semi-final 1: 26 February 2001
- Semi-final 2: 27 February 2001
- Semi-final 3: 1 March 2001
- Semi-final 4: 2 March 2001
- Final: 3 March 2001
- Venue: Teatro Ariston; Sanremo, Italy

Organisation
- Broadcaster: Radiotelevisione italiana (RAI)
- Musical director: Gianfranco Lombardi
- Presenters: Raffaella Carrà and Megan Gale, Enrico Papi, Massimo Ceccherini

Big Artists section
- Number of entries: 16
- Winner: "Luce (Tramonti a nord est)" Elisa

Newcomers' section
- Number of entries: 16
- Winner: "Stai con me (Forever)"; Gazosa

The Sanremo Music Festival 2001 (Italian: Festival di Sanremo 2001), officially the 51st Italian Song Festival (51º Festival della canzone italiana), was the 51st annual Sanremo Music Festival, held at the Teatro Ariston in Sanremo between 26 February and 3 March 2001 and broadcast by Radiotelevisione italiana (RAI). The show was presented by Raffaella Carrà, assisted by Megan Gale, Massimo Ceccherini and Enrico Papi.

The quality jury consisted of Gino Paoli (who served as president), Iva Zanicchi, Margherita Buy, Francesca Archibugi, Omar Calabrese, Piero Chiambretti, Saverio Marconi, Alberto Testa, Giovanni Veronesi and Piero Vivarelli. The winner of the Big Artists section was Elisa with the song "Luce (Tramonti a nord est)", which also won the Critics Award. The group Gazosa won the Newcomers section with the song "Stai con me (Forever)".

Every night, Enrico Papi and Raffaella Carrà hosted Dopo il festival tutti da me, a talk show about the Festival with the participation of singers and journalists.

== Participants and results ==
=== Big Artists ===
Big Artists section
Song	Artist(s)	Songwriter(s)	Rank	Notes
"Luce (Tramonti a nord est)"	Elisa	Elisa Toffoli; Zucchero Fornaciari	1	Winner of the "Big Artists" section; Mia Martini Critics Award
"Di sole e d'azzurro"	Giorgia	Zucchero Fornaciari; Mino Vergnaghi; Matteo Saggese	2	
"Questa nostra grande storia d'amore"	Matia Bazar	Giancarlo Golzi; Piero Cassano	3	
"L'acrobata"	Michele Zarrillo	Michele Zarrillo; Vincenzo Incenzo	4	
"Saluto l'inverno"	Paola Turci	Paola Turci; Carmen Consoli	5	
"Anche tu"	Jenny B	Giancarlo Golzi; Piero Cassano	6	
"Sono contento"	Alex Britti	Alex Britti	7	Volare Award for Best Music
"Tu che ne sai"	Gigi D'Alessio	Vincenzo D'Agostino; Gigi D'Alessio	8	
"Ciao Ninìn"	Fabio Concato	Fabio Concato	9	
"L'eterno movimento"	Anna Oxa	Laurex; Giuseppe Fulcheri	10	
"Pioverà (Habibi ené)"	Peppino di Capri	Franco Del Prete; Marcello Vitale; Peppino di Capri	11	
"Il profumo del mare"	Gianni Bella	Gianni Bella; Mogol	12	
"Fantasticamenteamore"	Syria	Biagio Antonacci; Saverio Lanza	13	
"Mezze verità"	Sottotono	Massimiliano Dagani; Massimiliano Cellamaro	14	
"Bentivoglio Angelina"	Quintorigo	Massimo De Leonardis; Michele Montanari; Valentino Bianchi; Stefano Ricci; Guido Facchini; Andrea Costa; Gionata Costa	15	Volare Award for Best Arrangement
"L'assenzio (The Power of Nothing)"	Bluvertigo	Marco Castoldi; Luca Urbani	16	

=== Newcomers ===
Newcomers section
Song	Artist(s)	Songwriter(s)	Rank	Notes
"Stai con me (Forever)"	Gazosa	Stefano Borzi; E. Caterini; Sandro Nasuti	1	Winner of the Newcomers' section
"Maggie"	Moses	Matteo Di Franco; Sergio Moschetto; Andrea Zuppini	2	
"Turuturu"	Francesco & Giada	Francesco Boccia; Giada Caliendo	3	
"Targato NA"	Principe e Socio M.	Mauro Spenillo; Antonio De Carmine	4	
"Promessa"	Carlotta	Luca Angelosanti; Assolo; Carla Quadraccia; Francesco Morettini; Davide Massa; Marco De Iaco; Alex Zuccaro	5	
"Raccontami"	Francesco Renga	Francesco Renga; Umberto Iervolino	6	Winner of the Mia Martini Critics Award - Newcomers' section (shared with Roberto Angelini)
"Ed io non ci sto più"	Paolo Meneguzzi	Roberto Zappalorto	7	
"Emily"	Carlito	Carlo De Bei	8	Volare Award for Best Lyrics
"Luna"	XSense	Alessandro Branca; Jacopo Monasta; Giacomo Godi; Paolo Brera	9	
"Il Signor Domani"	Roberto Angelini	Roberto Angelini	10	Winner of the Mia Martini Critics Award - Newcomers' section (shared with Francesco Renga)
"Bocca"	Sara 6	Serenella Occhipinti; Mauro Gardella; Serenella Occhipinti	11	
"Nascosto dietro un vetro"	Velvet	Pierluigi Ferrantini; Giancarlo Cornetta; Alessandro Sgreccia; Pierfrancesco Bazzoffi; Pierluigi Ferrantini	12	
"Battiti"	Stefano Ligi	Stefano Ligi; Roberto Costa	13	
"Ho vinto un viaggio"	Riky Anelli	Riky E. Anelli; Bruno Santori; C. H. Sementina	14	
"Quando io"	Pincapallina	Paolo Milzani	15	
"Grazie"	Isola Song	Salvatore Melis; Giuseppe Melis	16	

== Guests ==
Guests
Artist(s)	Song(s)
Ronan Keating	"Lovin' Each Day"
Faith Hill	"The Way You Love Me"
Eminem with D12	"I'm Back" "Purple Hills" "The Real Slim Shady"
30 Odd Foot of Grunts	"Things Have Got to Change" "Sail Those Same Oceans"
Westlife	"I Lay My Love On You"
Anastacia	"I'm Outta Love"
Placebo	"Special K"
Moby	"South Side"
Enya	"Wild Child"
Ricky Martin	"Nobody Wants to Be Lonely" "She Bangs"
