= Tiziana Rivale =

Italian singer (born 1958)

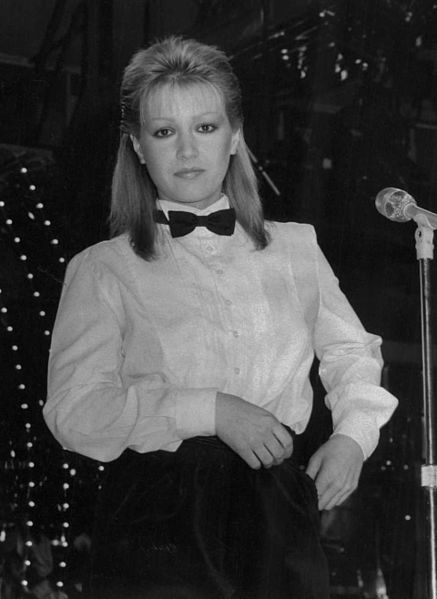
- Rivale at Sanremo 1983

Background information
- Born: Letizia Oliva; 13 August 1958 (age 67); Formia, Italy
- Genres: Pop, Italo disco
- Occupation(s): Singer, songwriter
- Years active: 1981–present
- Website: www.tizianarivale.com

Letizia Oliva (born 13 August 1958), known professionally as Tiziana Rivale, is an Italian singer primarily associated with the Italo disco style. In 1983, she won the Sanremo Music Festival with the song "Sarà quel che sarà".

== Life and career ==
Letizia Olivia was born in Formia, Italy, where by the age of eleven she had become determined to pursue a musical career. After being a vocalist in the musical group Rockollection, in 1980 Oliva debuted as a solo singer under the stage name Tiziana Ciao. After signing under contract with WEA Italiana, she adopted her career-long stage name Tiziana Rivale (occasionally shortened to just Rivale for releases) and released her debut single under this name, "L'amore va" (1983). A self-trained vocalist, around the same time she had been recording television jingles with other artists, including Ivana Spagna and Ronnie Jones.

In 1983, Rivale won a selection organized by Domenica in that put up for grabs a place in the 32nd edition of the Sanremo Music Festival, and eventually won the main competition with the song "Sarà quel che sarà". The song was also Rivale's biggest commercial success, remaining on the Italian music charts for twelve weeks and peaking at No. 5. Rivale would go on to gradually record and release three albums following the competition – the eponymous self-titled pop ballad-based Tiziana Rivale (1983) which also featured "Sarà quel che sarà", the synth-pop/Italo disco album Contatto (1986), and the Italo disco concept album Destiny (1988). Although she starred in a music video – her only one – for the titular track of Destiny, no commercial single was ever released. As the 1980s came to a close, Rivale gradually focused her attention on live musical performances, primarily performing in club venues and seldom making television appearances by the end of the decade as the popularity of the genre waned. Between 1988 and 1992 Rivale moved to Los Angeles and took a break from the music industry before moving back to Italy and resuming her musical career.

Following the release of the albums Con tutto l'amore che c'è (1996) and Angelo biondo (2000), as well as her sole compilation album Il meglio (1997), Rivale would then sign on with the retro label FlashBack Records. Off her sixth studio album Mystic Rain (2009) the lead single "Ash" (2008) was well-received upon release, and has been regarded as one of the best Italo disco songs in recent years. Rivale released two additional studio albums under similar retro labels, True (2011) and the multi-language Babylon 2015 (2015); while none of these new albums managed to chart, they were made widely available, as with her older albums (which became more widely re-released and internationally distributed upon remastering).

Rivale continues to perform in Italian retro club venues as well as record new material.

== Discography ==
All albums and single releases credited under Tiziana Rivale unless otherwise stated.

=== Albums ===
- Tiziana Rivale (1983) – Italy No. 38
- Contatto (1986) – Italy No. 80
- Destiny (1988) (as Rivale) – Italy No. 123
- Con tutto l'amore che c'è (1996) (as Rivale)
- Angelo biondo (2000)
- Mystic Rain (2009) (as Rivale)
- True (2011)
- Babylon 2015 (2015)

==== Compilations ====
- Il meglio (1997) – Italy No. 98

=== Singles ===
- "L'amore va" (1983) – Italy No. 76
- "Sarà quel che sarà" / "Serenade" (1983) – Italy No. 5
- "Questo mondo è una baracca" (1983)
- "C'est la vie" (1984) – Italy No. 115
- "Ferma il mondo" / "Moviestory" (1985)
- "È finita qui" (1994)
- "Ash" / "Flame" (2008) – Italy No. 208
- "Telephone" / "Daily Dream" (2009)
- "For Always" (2014)

Awards and achievements
Preceded by Riccardo Fogli with "Storie di tutti i giorni"	Sanremo Music Festival; Winner; 1983	Succeeded by Al Bano & Romina Power with "Ci sarà"
