= Laura Muscardin =

Italian film director and screenwriter

Laura Muscardin is an Italian film director and screenwriter.

== Life ==
Muscardin was awarded a graduate degree in modern history from the University of Rome.

== Career ==
She made her debut in the cinema industry as assistant director for the feature film Una vita scellerata (A Violent Life) by Giacomo Battiato. After directing the short Il cuore – Le coeur (The Heart) in 1998, in 2001 she directed her first feature film Giorni (Days), a romantic film about a man dying of AIDS, featuring Thomas Trabacchi and Riccardo Salerno. In 2002 the movie was awarded as Best Film at the Seattle Lesbian & Gay Film Festival and won a special mention at the Milano International Gay & Lesbian Film Festival, and the director was awarded as Emerging Talent at the L.A Outfest.

In 2007 she directed the feature film Billo: Il grand Dakhaar, a comedy about immigration about a Senegalese fashion designer, played by real-life designer Thierno Thiam, torn between women in Rome and back home. It was coproduced by Youssou N’Dour who also composed the original score. The film was awarded as Best Feature Film at the Temekula Film Festival (California) and at the Festivals of Italian Cinema in Paris and Villerupt (in the former the jury was headed by Jeanne Moreau).

Afterwards she directed in 2009 the French TV series La vie est à nous and in 2011 the third season of the Italian TV series Tutti pazzi per amore.

She has also directed a making-of documentary about Roberto Rossellini's film Rome, Open City.

== Filmography ==
- Tutti pazzi per amore 3 (All Crazy About Love 3) - d. 26 episodies (2011)
- Tutti pazzi per amore (All Crazy About Love) 1st and 2nd season – second unit d. TV series 52 episodies (2008–2010)
- La vie est à nous (France) – d. TV series, episodies (2009)
- Billo – Il grand Dakhaar – d. feature film (2007)
- Figli di Roma città aperta (Children of Rome Open City) – d. documentary (2005)
- Giorni (Days) – d. feature film (2001)
- Viva Verdi (Verdi Forever) – d. documentary (2003)
- Baci da Roma (Love and Kisses from Rome) – d. documentary (2000)
- Carla si è chiusa in bagno (Carla Has Locked Herself in the Bathroom) – d. short (1999)
- Le coeur – Il cuore (The Heart) – d. short (1998)
- Charlie e il serpente (Charlie and the Snake) – d. short (1996)
- Vernichtung Baby – co d. with Giovanni Piperno – documentary (1995)
- Tea on the Set – co d. with Giovanni Piperno – documentary (1995)
- Black Taxi – co d. with Giovanni Piperno – documentary (1993)
