= Zarathustra (album) =

Studio album by Museo Rosenbach
- Released: April 1973
- Recorded: 1972
- Genre: Progressive rock
- Length: 39:21
- Label: Ricordi

Museo Rosenbach chronology
Zarathustra (1973)	Rare and Unreleased (1992)

Zarathustra is the debut studio album by Italian band Museo Rosenbach released in 1973. It is generally regarded as one of the best Italian progressive rock works of all time.

Controversially, the lyrics compose a concept album of Friedrich Nietzsche's philosophy, particularly his 1883–1885 novel Thus Spoke Zarathustra. The song titles translate into "The Last Man", "The King of Yesterday", "Beyond Good and Evil", "Übermensch", "The Temple of Hourglasses", "Of Man", "Of Nature", and "Of the Eternal Return".

The music has been edited by bassist Alberto Moreno, texts from external collaborator Mauro La Luce. Side A is completely occupied by the long suite Zarathustra, side B includes the remaining three songs, which relate thematically to the first part by the expression of the concept album, so dear to progressive rock groups.

The cover, a human face assembled from a photographic collage, was reworked by the label from an idea of the band's and included images of a prison, of poor children and of a bust of Mussolini; the back cover showed two crossed arms, one of them with a syringe in a vein. Together with the Nietzschean title and the word superuomo, this led much of the public to label the group as pro-fascist, and RAI gave the record almost no airplay. Reviews were favourable but sales were poor, and Ricordi, which had signed the band for three albums, dropped it.

The singer, Stefano Galifi, later joined an art rock band named Il Tempio delle Clessidre ("The Temple of Hourglasses"), quoting the title of the track.

== Track listing ==
Side one

1. Zarathustra – 20:31
  - Zarathustra: L'Ultimo Uomo – 3:55
  - Zarathustra: Il Re di Ieri – 4:40
  - Zarathustra: Al di Là del Bene e del Male – 2:39
  - Zarathustra: Superuomo – 6:25
  - Zarathustra: Il Tempio delle Clessidre – 2:52

Side two

2. "Degli Uomini – 4:04
3. Della Natura – 8:28
4. Dell'Eterno Ritorno – 6:18

== Personnel ==
- Giancarlo Golzi – drums, percussion, vocals
- Alberto Moreno – bass and piano
- Enzo Merogno – guitar, vocals
- Pit Corradi – mellotron, Hammond organ, vibraphone, Farfisa electric piano
- Stefano Galifi – vocals

== Sources ==
- "Museo Rosenbach Zarathustra" at www.progreviews.com.
