= Se mi lasci non vale =

1976 song

Song by Luciano Rossi

from the album Aria pulita
- Released: 1976
- Genre: Pop
- Length: 2:56
- Label: Ariston Records; Dischi Ricordi
- Composer: Luciano Rossi
- Lyricist: Gianni Belfiore

"Se mi lasci non vale" (Italian pronunciation: [se (m)mi ˈlaʃʃi noɱ ˈvaːle]; transl. "If you leave me, it's not fair") is a 1976 Italian song written by Luciano Rossi (music) and Gianni Belfiore (lyrics).

The song was first recorded by Italian singer Luciano Rossi, who included it in his album Aria pulita of March 1976. It was brought to international success by Spanish singer Julio Iglesias, whose version became the most popular one to Italian audience and also gave the title to his album of the same year. Both versions (as well as the following ones) feature a disco-inspired strings arrangement originally ideated by composer Ruggero Cini.

Over the years, other Italian artists have reinterpreted the song, which was later also adapted into English, Greek, Spanish and Turkish.

== Song meaning and lyrics ==
In the song, a man addresses a woman he has been unfaithful to: the woman has decided to break up with him and leave (she has already packed her bags), then he tries to apologize, to justify himself and to convince her not to go away.

== Julio Iglesias version ==
"Se mi lasci non vale"

Single by Julio Iglesias

from the album Se mi lasci non vale
- B-side: "Quella di sempre"
- Released: 1976
- Genre: Disco-pop
- Length: 3:06
- Label: Ariston Records
- Composer: Luciano Rossi
- Lyricist: Gianni Belfiore

Julio Iglesias presented the song as a guest at the Sanremo Festival 1976, but his performance was not broadcast live by RAI, which gave precedence to the news broadcasting. The Madrilenian singer later also recorded a version with lyrics adapted by himself into Spanish, titled "Si me dejas, no vale"; this was included in his 1977 album A mis 33 años. The song (in Italian) was also included in Julio's 1978 compilation album Da Manuela a Pensami. Iglesias' version presents a more disco-oriented sound. It was certified gold in Italy (with over 35,000 copies sold).

=== Track listing ===
7"

| No. | Title | Writer(s) | Length |
|---|---|---|---|
| 1. | "Se mi lasci non vale" | Luciano Rossi; Gianni Belfiore | 3:00 |
| 2. | "Quella di sempre" | Ana Magdalena; Manuel Alejandro; Alberto Salerno | 3:28 |

=== Charts ===
| Chart (1976–1977) | Highest position |
|---|---|
| Italy (Musica e dischi) | 16 |

== Cover versions ==
=== Italian ===
- Victor Bach
- Rita Forte
- Tony Marlow
- Simonetta
- La Linea

=== In other languages ===
- English – "Let's Try Once Again" – adapted by Lucille Bailly, recorded by Patrick Norman.
- Greek – "Άν μια μέρα σε χάσω", adapted by Sevi Tiliakou, recorded by Paschalis Arvanitidis.
- Spanish – "Si me dejas, no vale" – adapted and recorded by Julio Iglesias.
- Turkish – "Yeniden Başlasın" – adapted by Fikret Şeneş, recorded by Ajda Pekkan and Yeşim Salkım.

== In popular culture ==
- The song is quoted in the 1979 Italian film Hot Potato, where its refrain is referenced twice by protagonist Renato Pozzetto.
- 2010 film La valigia sul letto, by Eduardo Tartaglia, is named after the first line of the song.
- The song gave title to the 2016 comedy film Se mi lasci non vale, by Vincenzo Salemme.
- Between 2017 and 2022, it was adopted as a well-wishing anthem by supporters of Potenza Calcio, and regularly played in their stadium Stadio Alfredo Viviani before home matches.
- The song was covered during the popular 1990s Italian TV show Non è la Rai.
