= Corrado Mantoni =

Italian actor

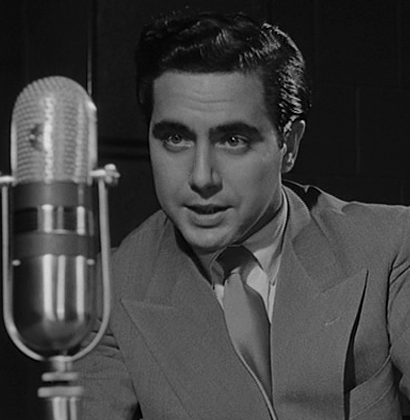
- Mantoni in the movie Bellissima (1951)
- Born: Corrado Mantoni; 2 August 1924; Rome, Italy
- Died: 8 June 1999 (aged 74); Rome, Italy
- Occupations: Television presenter; television writer; radio presenter; producer
- Years active: 1944–1999
- Height: 1.77 m (5 ft 10 in)

Corrado Mantoni (2 August 1924 – 8 June 1999), known mononymously as Corrado, was an Italian television and radio presenter, producer, and television writer.

== Biography ==
He was born in Rome, where he followed classic studies and in jurisprudence; before finishing university studies he started to work as radio speaker with EIAR, predecessor of RAI, Italian State Television. He was the first to announce to the Italian public events such as the end of World War II, the birth of the Italian Republic or the death of Trilussa. He also worked as dubber for foreign actors including Jerry Lewis.

In 1949, he was chosen by RAI as their first TV host for the Italian first experimental TV broadcasting. In the 1950s he was the foremost radio host in the country, and also took part in numerous movies as himself.

Corrado began to work for TV in the 1960s as the host of popular shows such as Canzonissima, Miss Italia, the Sanremo Festival (1974) and Domenica In, which he invented and inaugurated in 1976. Another show for which he was one of the first host was Fantastico. He also worked for the TSI, the Italian-speaking Swiss television. In 1978, together with his collaborator Dora Moroni, had a car accident which obliged her to have several operations.

In 1982 Corrado moved to the private-owner Silvio Berlusconi's network. His shows included Il pranzo è servito and, perhaps his most popular, La corrida, in which is an Italian version of The Gong Show.

He was also a speaker of songs, mainly of children songs. His 1982 song "Carletto" topped the Italian hit parade for 11 weeks, winning the Golden Disck.

Corrado was author nearly of all his shows with the pseudonym of Corima, often in collaboration with his brother Riccardo. He died of lung cancer in Rome in 1999.

== Personal life ==
He was married to Italian television producer Marina Donato.
