= Antonella Ruggiero =

Italian singer (born 1952)

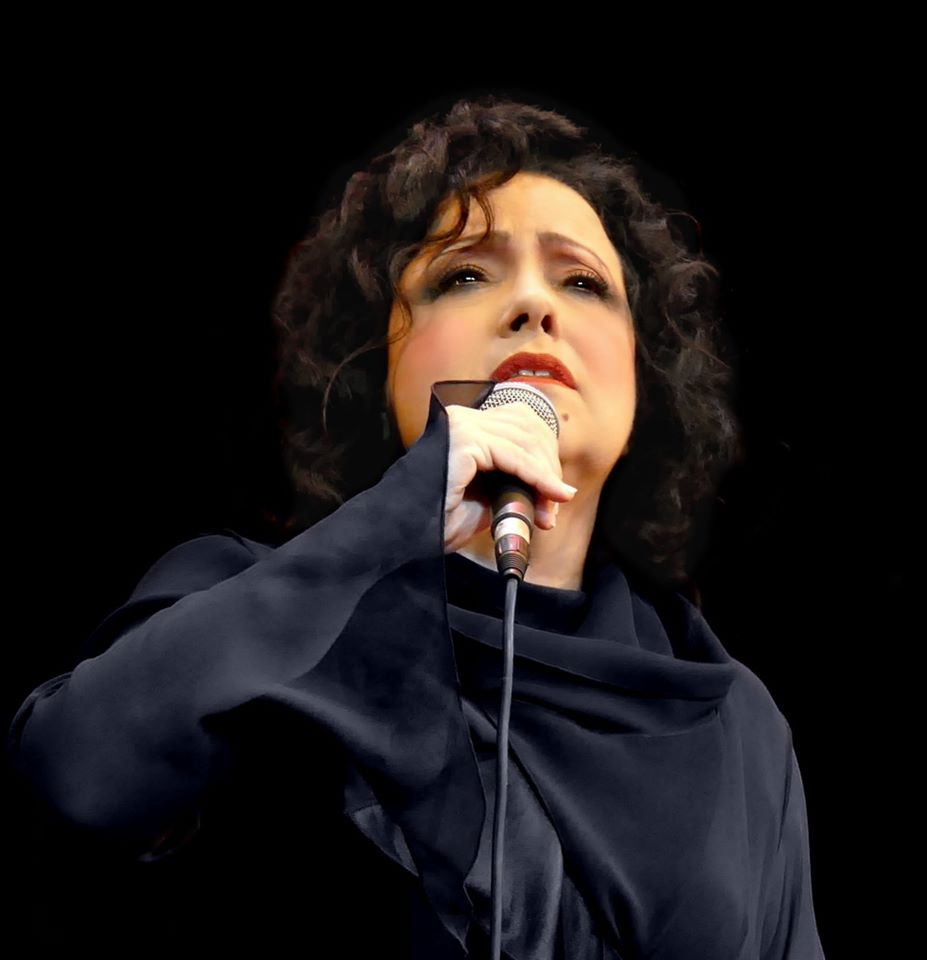
- Antonella Ruggiero in Moscow in May 2015

Background information
- Also known as: Matia
- Born: Antonella Ruggiero; 15 November 1952 (age 73); Genoa, Liguria, Italy
- Genre: Pop
- Occupation: Singer
- Instrument: Vocals
- Years active: 1974–present
- Labels: Liberamusic (her independent label); Edel Music (distribution)
- Website: antonellaruggiero.com

Antonella Ruggiero (Italian pronunciation: [antoˈnɛlla rudˈdʒɛːro]; born 15 November 1952) is an Italian singer and songwriter, mostly known as a founding member and lead singer of the pop-rock band Matia Bazar.

Ruggiero is a light soprano. Her vocal range exceeds 4 octaves thanks to the use of the whistle register.

== Early life ==
Antonella Ruggiero was born in Genoa, Liguria. She grew up in the Pegli neighbourhood, where she attended the local Art Institute. Following a brief spell as a graphic designer, she decided to embark on a music career.

== Career ==
=== 1970s ===
Ruggiero adopted the pseudonym Matia as a stage name. ("Matia" meaning "craziness" or "crazy woman" in the Genoese vernacular) In 1972 she contributed backing vocals to the prog-rock band Jet's maiden album Fede, speranza e carità. (Faith, Hope and Charity) Her debut single, Io Matia, was released in 1974.

==== Matia Bazar ====
In 1975, Ruggiero, along with drummer Giancarlo Golzi and three former members of Jet (keyboardist Piero Cassano, bassist Aldo Stellita and guitarist Carlo Marrale) formed Matia Bazar. The band established itself as one of Italy's most popular music acts from the 1970s/1980s. They won the 1978 Sanremo Music Festival with "... e dirsi ciao" and represented Italy at the Eurovision Song Contest 1979 with "Raggio di luna". Other popular hits by the band include "Ma perché", "Solo tu", "Per un'ora d’amore", "Stasera che sera", "Cavallo bianco", "Il video sono io", "Mister Mandarino", "Souvenir", "Ti sento" and "Vacanze romane".

Matia Bazar's 1985 single "Ti sento" (I Feel You) topped the charts in Belgium and Italy. In 1989, Ruggiero decided to leave the band and pursue a solo career.

=== 1990s ===
In 1996, Ruggiero released her debut solo album Libera. In 1998 she participated in the Sanremo Festival, finishing second with "Amore lontanissimo". The song won the Music Critics Award for best arrangement. In 1999 she returned to the festival with "Non ti dimentico (Se non ci fossero le nuvole)", finishing second again. The song, written together with her husband Roberto Colombo, was dedicated to Ruggiero's former bandmate in Matia Bazar, Aldo Stellita, who had died prematurely the year before. Ruggiero's third solo album, Sospesa, featured Ennio Morricone, who contributed to "And Will You Love Me", and Giovanni Lindo Ferretti, who co-wrote "Di perle e inverni".

=== 2000s ===
In 2003 Ruggiero returned to the Sanremo Music Festival with "Di un amore". She finished in ninth place.

On 4 June 2004, she performed a concert at the Brooklyn Museum in New York as a worldwide preview of her new album Sacrarmonia Live (Il viaggio). The album, a collection of religious and spiritual songs from different parts of the world, was previewed in Europe on 25 November 2004 with a gig at The Sugar Club in Dublin. On both occasions, Ruggiero was supported by Mark Harris (piano), Carlo Cantini (strings) and Ivan Ciccarelli (percussions).

In 2005, she re-entered the Sanremo Music Festival with "Echi d'infinito". She finished third and was awarded the first prize in the "Female Singers" category.

In 2005, together with the choirs of Sant'Ilario di Rovereto and Valle Dei Laghi di Padergnone, she contributed to "Echi d'infinito", a project consisting in traditional songs from the Alpine region sung a cappella.

Ruggiero's tours often presented a thematic approach. These include "Tribute to Amália Rodrigues", a tribute to the Portuguese fado and its more famous performer; "Four steps for Broadway", a recital devoted to popular Broadway musicals such as "Tonight", "Over The Rainbow" and "Summertime"); and "Stralunato Recital" where she performed her most popular songs.

In 2007, she participated once again in the Sanremo with the song "Canzone fra le guerre" (written in collaboration with Cristian Carrara), finishing tenth. During the Festival's third night, she performed a cappella with the Valle Dei Laghi and the Sant'Ilario Polyphonic Choirs.

In October 2009, the German dance act Scooter released a cover version of "Ti sento", featuring Ruggiero on vocals. She also participated to the supporting music video, playing the part of an opera singer. The single peaked at number ten on the German Singles Chart in October 2009, becoming Ruggiero's first German top ten hit in her career. (The Matia Bazar original version of "Ti sento" had peaked at number eleven in August 1986).

=== 2010s ===
In 2010, Ruggiero released two new albums – "Contemporanea tango" (a tribute to Argentine music) and "I regali di natale", a Christmas album featuring different musical atmospheres, from classical music to jazz, pop and electronica. In 2014, she participated once again in the Sanremo with two songs – "Da lontano" and "Quando balliamo". The audience voted "Da lontano" as the best of the two. Ruggiero finished twelfth. On 19 February 2014, the album "L'impossibile è certo", a collection of unreleased songs from 1989, entered the Italian charts, hitting the 18th spot.

On 18 June 2015, she collaborated with ConiglioViola on "Requiem Elettronico", a collection of ten Italian pop songs focused on the theme of death. The album was released alongside a DVD featuring the recording of two live performances and some film clips shot by ConiglioViola.

On 31 October 2015, Ruggiero sang Domenico Modugno's "Nel blu, dipinto di blu (song)" supported by a children's choir during the closing ceremony of Expo 2015 in Milan. On 13 November 2015, she released the album "Cattedrali". It features the organist Fausto Caporali and was recorded live in the Cathedral of Cremona on October 24, 2014.

On 25 November 2016, Ruggiero released "La vita imprevedibile delle canzoni", an album recorded at the Fazioli Pianoforti factory in Sacile. On the occasion, Ruggiero reworked 15 songs from her repertoire with arrangements by Stefano Barzan and classical pianist Andrea Bacchetti.

On 20 November 2018, she released the box set "Quando facevo la cantante". A total of 115 songs from 1996 to 2018, both recorded live and in studio, are divided into 6 separate albums: "Canzoni dialettali", "Le mie canzoni", "Cantautori", "Canzoni dal mondo", "Il sacro e il classico" and "Le rarità".

== Discography ==
=== With Matia Bazar ===
==== Albums ====
- Matia Bazar 1 (1976)
- Granbazar (1977)
- Semplicità (1978)
- Tournée (1979)
- Il tempo del sole (1980)
- Berlino, Parigi, Londra (1982)
- Tango (1983)
- Aristocratica (1984)
- Melanchólia (1985)
- Melò (1987)
- Red Corner (1989)

=== Solo ===
==== Albums ====
- 1996 – Libera
- 1998 – Registrazioni moderne
- 1999 – Sospesa
- 2001 – Luna crescente – Sacrarmonia
- 2003 – Antonella Ruggiero
- 2005 – Big Band!
- 2006 – L'abitudine della luce
- 2007 – Genova, la Superba
- 2008 – Pomodoro genetico
- 2010 – I regali di Natale (covers album of Christmas songs)
- 2013 – Qualcosa è nell'aria – digital album available to download via Antonella's official website (3 tracks)
- 2014 – L'impossibile è certo
- 2015 – Cattedrali
- 2016 – La vita imprevedibile delle canzoni
- 2018 – Quando facevo la cantante

==== Singles ====
- 1974 – La strada del perdono/Io, Matia (feat. Jet)
- 1996 – La filastrocca
- 1996 – La danza (radio edit, album version)
- 1997 – Per un'ora d'amore (feat. Subsonica)
- 1997 – Fantasia (feat. Bluvertigo)
- 1997 – Solo tu MIX
- 1998 – Amore lontanissimo
- 1998 – Donde estas
- 1999 – Non ti dimentico
- 1999 – Controvento
- 1999 – Non dirmi dove, non dirmi quando
- 1999 – Il sole al nadir (radio vers., jungle vers.) – soundtrack Harem Suare – Ferzan Özpetek
- 2001 – Occhi di bambino / Kyrie / Ave Maria
- 2003 – Il bosco dell'acqua (exhibition "abitare il Tempo" – XVIII Edition – Verona)
- 2003 – Il bravo giardiniere
- 2003 – Di un amore
- 2005 – Echi d'infinito
- 2009 - Ti sento (with Scooter)
- 2019 – Senza
- 2020 – Con

==== Compilation albums ====
- 2012 – Il meglio di Antonella Ruggiero ("best of" compilation – double CD)

==== Live albums ====
- 2004 – Sacrarmonia Live
- 2006 – Stralunato recital live
- 2007 – Souvenir d'Italie
- 2009 – Cjanta Vilotis
- 2010 – Contemporanea Tango (feat. "Hyperion Ensemble" orchestra)
- 2012 – Buon Natale – Live in concert (feat. "I Virtuosi Italiani" orchestra)
- 2015 – Requiem Elettronico (feat. ConiglioViola)
- 2020 – Empatia
