= Christian (singer) =

Italian singer (1943–2025)

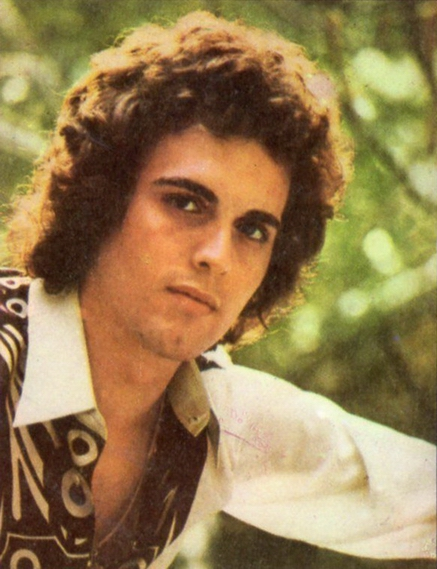
- Christian in 1972

Background information
- Born: Gaetano Cristiano Vincenzo Rossi; 8 September 1943; Palermo, Italy
- Died: 26 September 2025 (aged 82) Milan, Italy
- Occupation: Singer
- Spouse: Dora Moroni (m. 1987; div. 1997)

Gaetano Cristiano Vincenzo Rossi (8 September 1943 – 26 September 2025), best known as Christian, was an Italian singer, mainly successful in the first half of the 1980s.

== Life and career ==
Born in Palermo, the son of a policeman and a housewife, at young age Rossi was a football player for Palermo and Mantova F.C., but had to quit for a cardiac arrhythmia. He started his career as a singer in the early 1970s, and got his first hit in 1980, with the song "Daniela" which ranked at the seventh place on the Italian hit parade. Often compared with Julio Iglesias, with whom he shared some musical authors and a similar style, between 1982 and 1984 Christian had four singles peaking at first place on the Italian hit parade. Between 1982 and 1990 he also entered the main competition at the Sanremo Music Festival six times, ranking third in 1984 with the song "Cara".

Rossi married the singer Dora Moroni in 1987; the couple divorced in 1997. They had a son, Alfredo.

Rossi died at the Policlinico of Milan from an intracerebral haemorrhage on 26 September 2025, at the age of 82.

== Discography ==
Albums

- 1977 – Piccola incosciente
- 1982 – Un'altra vita un altro amore
- 1983 – Christian
- 1984 – Cara
- 1985 – Sere
- 1986 – Insieme
- 1987 – Quando l'amore...
- 1988 – Guardando il cielo
- 1990 – Se non è amore...deve essere amore
- 1990 – Canzoni di Natale
- 1991 – L'amore è una cosa meravigliosa
- 1992 – Un cielo in più ed altri successi
- 1993 – Christian 1993
- 1995 – Parlami
- 1996 – Angeli senza paradiso
- 2000 – Cuore in viaggio
- 2004 – Finalmente l'alba
- 2007 – Per amore
- 2011 – Cara mamma
- 2015 – Christian The Best of

=== Singles ===
- 1967: Ti voglio tanto bene – Hai ragione tu
- 1967: L'amore di una sola estate – Tutto finirà
- 1968: Ora sei con me – C'è tanto mare
- 1968: Tutte meno te – Una così così
- 1969: Oro e argento – Tra di noi
- 1970: Amore vero amore amaro – Sayonara
- 1971: Firmamento – Amo
- 1972: Come mai – Dai vieni con noi
- 1974: Giochi d'amore – Sole nero
- 1975: Sto con lei – Dormici sopra (Spark, SR 828)
- 1976: Dolce donna – Non so dir ti voglio bene
- 1976: Piccola Incosciente – Ma ci pensi tu
- 1977: Che sventola – Non dimenticar (Spark, SR 853)
- 1978: Parlami di lei – Colpo d'amore
- 1979: Santa Caterina – Vangelo
- 1980: Adesso amiamoci – Scusa
- 1980: Daniela – Non voglio perderti
- 1982: Un'altra vita un altro amore – Com'eri bella tu
- 1983: Abbracciami amore mio – Volare via
- 1983: Nostalgia – Solo tu
- 1984: Cara – Un giorno in più
- 1984: Se te ne vai – Solo tu
- 1985: Notte serena – Fra poco il sole è là
- 1985: Insieme – Calypso melody
- 1987: Aria e musica – Noi non cambieremo mai
- 1987: Quando l'amore se ne va
- 1988: Rimini – Rimini (versione strumentale)
- 1989: Bikini – E vola via l'età
- 1990: Amore – Una speranza
- 2016: Siamo solo uomini
