= Paolo Zavallone =

Italian singer and composer (1932–2023)

Background information
- Birth name: Paolo Zavalloni
- Also known as: El Pasador
- Born: 29 August 1932 Riccione, Italy
- Died: 20 June 2023 (aged 90)
- Genres: Disco, Pop, Funk, Soul
- Occupation(s): Bandleader, composer, artist, multi-instrumentalist
- Instrument(s): piano, singer, songwriter
- Years active: 1950s–1982

Paolo Zavalloni (29 August 1932 – 20 June 2023), best known as Paolo Zavallone (as an assonance with the surnames of singers Renato Carosone and Fred Buscaglione) and El Pasador, was an Italian singer, bandleader and composer.

== Life and career ==
Born in Riccione, Zavallone started his career in the early 1950s as the keyboardist in the orchestra of Henghel Gualdi. In 1957 he formed his own band. He became popular in the 1970s, as the bandleader in several TV shows and as the composer and singer of its theme songs. His major hit was the 1977 disco song "Amada Mia, Amore Mio", which peaked at #25 in Italian Singles Chart, #66 in Swiss Singles Chart, and #10 in German Singles Chart. Other hits include "Non stop", "Kilimangiaro" and "Papà ha la bua", a duet with his then 11 years old daughter Cristina. He also wrote songs for other artists, notably composing "Le notti lunghe" for Adriano Celentano.

In 1978 Zavallone served as conductor of the Sanremo Music Festival, and between 1989 and 2001 he was official arranger of Zecchino d'Oro.

Zavallone died on 20 June 2023, at the age of 90.

== Discography ==
=== Singles ===
Year	A-side	B-side	Label	Number	Name
1962	Cuando Calienta El Sol	Solo un'ora (Cha cha delle ore)	Club	CLS 7	Paolo Zavallone
1962	Jingle Bells Twist	Il Vagabondo	Club	CLS 8	Paolo Zavallone
1962	Daniela	Moliendo Café	Club	CLS 9	Paolo Zavallone
1962	Tango italiano	Quando Quando Quando	Club	CLS 10	Paolo Zavallone
1963	Lacrime Di Una Tromba	Gina	Club	CLS 18	Paolo Zavallone
1965	Surf Dell'Amore	Non mandarmi via	Italian Yank	IY 10002	Paolo Zavallone
1975	Madrugada	Ritratto Di Luisa	New Polaris	FK 26	El Pasador
1976	Amazonas	Tu Amor	New Polaris	FK 33	El Pasador
1977	Amada Mia, Amore Mio	Una Rosa	New Polaris	FK 44	El Pasador
1977	Non Stop	For Piano In Sol	New Polaris	FK 49	El Pasador
1978	Jeans Flower	Lo E Te	New Polaris	FK 51	Paolo Zavallone
1978	Mucho Mucho	Bamba Dadam	New Polaris	FK 52	El Pasador
1978	La Sberla	Rock Traumatologico	New Polaris	FK 54	El Pasador
1979	Kilimangiaro	Senorita C'est La Vie	New Polaris	FK 57	El Pasador
1980	Good Bye Amore I Love You	Toca... Toca...	New Polaris	FK 65	El Pasador
1980	Sbamm	Ragdo	Durium	LDAI-8096	El Pasador
1981	Mexico	Maraja	Fontana Records	6025 283	El Pasador
1981	Papà Ha La Bua	Mettiti La Maglia	Fontana Records	6025 286	El Pasador

=== Studio albums ===
Year	Title	Label	Number	Name
1974	Cocktail Di Stili	Broadway	BW 13070	Paolo Zavallone
1975	Madrugada	New Polaris	POL/BP 716	El Pasador
1976	Il Meglio De El Pasador	New Polaris	POL/BP 728	El Pasador
