= Sono un pirata, sono un signore =

Studio album by Julio Iglesias
- Released: 1978
- Genre: Latin pop
- Label: CBS
- Producer: Julio Iglesias, Manuel De La Calva, Ramon Arcusa; Italian production by Gianni Belfiore

Sono un pirata, sono un signore (I am a pirate, I am a gentleman) is a 1978 album by Julio Iglesias. The album, his first in Italian, was particularly successful in Italy and marked the start of major success for the Spanish singer in Italy. The album contains two of his most famous songs in Italy, namely "Pensami" (the Italian version of "Júrame", written in the 1920s by Mexican composer María Grever) and "Sono un pirata, sono un signore".

The album also contains "Abbracciami" ("Abrázame") and closes with a cover of the song "Limelight" by Charlie Chaplin, from the 1952 film of the same name. The adaptation of the texts in Italian and Italian production of the album was performed by Gianni Belfiore.

== Track listing ==
1. "Pensami (Júrame)" (Gianni Belfiore, Maria Grever) 4:05
2. "Sono un Pirata, Sono un Signore (Soy un Truhán, Soy un Señor)" (Julio Iglesias, Manuel De La Calva, Ramon Arcusa, Belfiore) 3:00
3. "Dove Sarai (Italian Version)" (Belfiore, Arcusa, De La Calva) 3:03
4. "Amico (Amigo)" (Rafael Perez-Botija, Belfiore) 4:38
5. "Abbracciami (Abrázame)" (Belfiore, Iglesias, Rafael Ferro) 3:45
6. "Restiamo Ancora Insieme (Para Que No Me Olvides)" (Ray Girado, Belfiore) 4:06
7. "33 Anni (33 Anos)" (Belfiore, Iglesias) 3:48
8. "Seguirò II Mio Cammino (Seguire Mi Camino)" (Belfiore, Iglesias, Dino Ramos) 3:11
9. "Sono Sempre Io (Casa Dia Mas)" (Ramos, Belfiore, Iglesias) 3:12
10. "Stai (Limelight)" (Charlie Chaplin, Decio Ardo, Belfiore) 5:02

== Sales and certifications ==
Region	Certification	Certified units/sales
Italy (AFI)	Platinum	500,000
