= Beans (band) =

Italian pop band

Beans (also spelled as I Beans) are an Italian pop band, mainly successful in the seventies.

== Career ==
The group formed in 1969 in Catania, Sicily. Under the production of singer-songwriter Gianni Bella, they got a large success with their cover of the 1918 Armando Gill's classic "Come Pioveva", which peaked at the fourth place on the Italian hit parade.

Following a number of minor hits, in 1978 the group entered the main competition at the Sanremo Music Festival with the song "Soli". The song named a RAI variety show, hosted by Patrizia Lazzari and Laura Trotter and with the participation of the same group.

== Personnel ==
- Armando Simola – lead vocalist (1967–1969)
- Pier Paolo Cristaldi – drums (1967–present)
- Tony Ranno – bass guitar, voice (1967–present)
- Salvatore Trovato – lead vocalist (1969–1972)
- Gino Finocchiaro – keyboards, voice (1969–1979)
- Giuseppe Russo – guitar (1969–1972)
- Pippo Panascì – guitar, voice (1972–present)
- Giuseppe Grillo – guitar, voice (1972–present)
- Franco Morgia – lead vocalist, guitar (1972–1979)
- Carmelo Morgia – lead vocalist, guitar (1979–present)
- Gaetano Coco – keyboards, voice (1979–1989)
- Alex Magrì – keyboards, voicei (1989–2003)

== Discography ==
Albums

- 1975: Come pioveva (CGD, 81176)
- 1976: Sto piangendo (CGD, 81732)
- 1978: Soli (CGD, 20037)
- 1983: Beans (La Ciminiera, CMR 79003)
- 1990: Ancora una volta si può (Sea Musica, ISO 0032)
- 1991: Melo Morgia canta i Beans (DV More Record, DV 1018)
- 1998: Stelle (DiscoBoom, CD 10041)
- 2001: I Beans cantano Battisti (DiscoBoom, CD 10076)
- 2005: I Beans per sempre (DiscoBoom)
- 2006: Le più belle canzoni dei Beans (Warner, 5051011-2926-2-0)
