= Un'emozione da poco =

Single by Anna Oxa

from the album Oxanna
- B-side: "Questa è vita"
- Released: February 1978
- Label: RCA Italiana
- Composer: Guido Guglielminetti
- Lyricist: Ivano Fossati

Anna Oxa singles chronology
| "Fiorellin del prato" (1976) | "Un'emozione da poco" (1978) | "Fatelo con me" (1978) |

Audio
- "Un'emozione da poco" on YouTube

"Un'emozione da poco" (transl. "An emotion of little value") is a 1978 song composed by Guido Guglielminetti (music) and Ivano Fossati (lyrics), arranged by Ruggero Cini and performed by Italian singer Anna Oxa.

== Background ==
The song premiered at the 28th edition of the Sanremo Music Festival, where Oxa performed it in a much discussed new-wave makeup conceived by Ivan Cattaneo and inspired by David Bowie, Iggy Pop and Lou Reed's look of the time. It eventually ranked second in the festival, and turned to be a surprise hit and Oxa's breakthrough.

Artists who covered the song include Paola Turci, Aram Quartet, Le Vibrazioni with Canova. The song was also featured in a scene of the film They Call Me Jeeg, in which it was performed by Luca Marinelli. At the 2023 Sanremo Music Festival, Oxa presented a new version of the song with Iljard Shaba.

== Track listing ==
| No. | Title | Writer(s) | Length |
|---|---|---|---|
| 1. | "Un'emozione da poco" | Guido Guglielminetti, Ivano Fossati | 4:12 |
| 2. | "Questa è vita" | Jeff Lynne, Maurizio Monti | 4:11 |

== Charts ==
| Chart | Peak position |
|---|---|
| Italy (Musica e dischi) | 1 |

== Certifications ==
| Region | Certification | Certified units/sales |
|---|---|---|
| Italy (FIMI) Digital sales and streaming since 2009 | Platinum | 100,000^{‡} |
^{‡} Sales+streaming figures based on certification alone.
