= Dora Moroni =

Italian singer (born 1956)

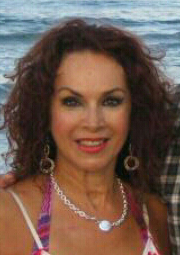
- Moroni in 2009

Background information
- Born: 14 December 1956 (age 69); Ravenna, Italy
- Genres: Pop
- Occupation: Singer
- Instrument: Vocals
- Years active: 1976 – present
- Labels: Ri-Fi; Carosello; Durium
- Spouse: Christian (m. 1987; div. 1997)

Dora Moroni (born 14 December 1956) is an Italian singer.

Dora Moroni was born in Ravenna. She demonstrated star potential very early in her life: at age 8, in 1964, after having participated in many music and singing contests, she won her first competition, in her home town.

In 1974, Moroni participated in a televised music contest, where she met famous Italian personalities, to include TV and radio host Corrado Mantoni, simply known as "Corrado" by his followers. Corrado became an active participant in Dora's career few years later in her life.

In 1975, Moroni posed for a variety magazine in Spain, where she had moved months earlier to start her acting career, however, Corrado offered Moroni the opportunity to conduct her very own show from 1976 to 1977. The show was Domenica in, and it became an instantaneous success, hitting the ratings at 18 million viewers in its first months in the air. Furthermore, while still hosting her show, Moroni started singing again, recording two songs written for her by the same Corrado. Both became top hits in the charts in 1977.

Moroni also shot many photo-romance novels, very popular in Italy at the time, and participated in various TV shows all over Italy between 1976 and 1978.

In July 1978, Corrado and Moroni were in a serious car accident, and Moroni was in a coma for two months.

She considers herself Roman Catholic.

== Discography ==
- 1977 - "Ma...se..." (45 rpm)
- 1977 - "Soli" (45 rpm)
- 1978 - "Ora" (45 rpm)
- 1978 - "Che facciamo stasera" (45 rpm)
- 1978 - "Dora Moroni in..." (33 1/3 rpm)
- 1983 - "Buona giornata" (45 rpm)
- 1995 - "Parlami" (with Italian singer Christian)
