= Solo tu =

Single by Matia Bazar

from the album L'oro dei Matia Bazar – Solo tu
- Language: Italian
- B-side: "Per un minuto e poi..."
- Released: 1977
- Label: Ariston
- Songwriter(s): Aldo Stellita; Piero Cassano; Carlo Marrale
- Producer(s): Paolo Cattaneo

Matia Bazar singles chronology
"Ma perché?" (1977)	"Solo tu" (1977)	"Mister Mandarino" (1977)

Audio
- "Solo Tu" on YouTube

"Solo tu" (transl. "Only You"), released in Spanish as "Sólo tú", is a 1977 song by the Italian pop group Matia Bazar, written by its members Aldo Stellita, Carlo Marrale and Piero Cassano.

== Background ==
One of the major hits of the band, it topped the Italian hit parade for 11 weeks. The song was also an international success, particularly in France, where the single sold over 500,000 copies.

It has been described as "easy and low-key", enhanced by a "radio-friendly sound and the vocal acrobatics of Antonella Ruggiero, who here is particularly expressive and elegant".

== Other versions ==
In 2001, Ornella Vanoni covered the song in a bossa nova style for her album Un panino una birra e poi.

== Track listing ==
No.	Title	Length
1.	"Solo tu"	3:45
2.	"Per un minuto e poi..."	5:44

== Charts ==
Chart (1977-8)	Peak position
France (SNEP)	8
Italy (Musica e dischi)	1
Spain (PROMUSICAE)	1
