= Marco Ferradini =

Italian singer-songwriter

- Born: 28 July 1949 (age 77); Como, Italy
- Occupation: Singer-songwriter
- Years active: 1978–present

Marco Ferradini (born 28 July 1949) is an Italian pop-rock singer-songwriter and musician.

== Career ==
Born in Como, Ferradini debuted as a guitarist in several groups. He started his career as a singer-songwriter in 1978, with the song "Quando Teresa verrà", which he entered the competition at the Sanremo Music Festival. His main success was the song "Teorema" (part of the EP Schiavo senza catene), which became in a short time a classic in Italy. In 1983 he competed at the Sanremo Festival with the song "Una catastrofe bionda"; the subsequent eponymous album contained the song "Lupo solitario DJ" which became during the years one another classic of his musical repertoire.

== Discography ==
Albums

- 1978 – Quando Teresa verrà (Spaghetti Records ZPLSR 34051)
- 1981 – Schiavo senza catene (Spaghetti Records ZPGSR 33415)
- 1982 – Q Concert (RCA Italiana PG 33428) (with Goran Kuzminac and Mario Castelnuovo)
- 1983 – Una catastrofe bionda (Spaghetti Records ZPLSR 34177)
- 1985 – Misteri della vita (Muvicom MULP 3001)
- 1986 – Marco Ferradini (Muvicom MULP 3002)
- 1991 – È bello avere un amico (Dischi Ricordi SMRL 6435)
- 1992 – Ricomincio da... Teorema (Dischi Ricordi SMRL 6457)
- 1995 – Dolce piccolo mio fiore (Pull 480339 2)
- 2001 – Geometrie del cuore (Hi-Lite/Ca' Bianca records HLCD 9073)
- 2005 – Filo rosso (INC/Duck DUBCD 1042)
