= Sanremo Music Festival 2002 =

Italian song contest (52nd edition)

Dates and venue
- Semi-final 1: 5 March 2002
- Semi-final 2: 6 March 2002
- Semi-final 3: 7 March 2002
- Semi-final 4: 8 March 2002
- Final: 9 March 2002
- Venue: Teatro Ariston; Sanremo, Italy

Organisation
- Broadcaster: Radiotelevisione italiana (RAI)
- Musical director: Pippo Caruso
- Artistic director: Pippo Baudo
- Presenters: Pippo Baudo and Manuela Arcuri, Vittoria Belvedere

Big Artists section
- Number of entries: 20
- Winner: "Messaggio d'amore" Matia Bazar

Newcomers' section
- Number of entries: 16
- Winner: "Doppiamente fragili" Anna Tatangelo

The Sanremo Music Festival 2002 (Italian: Festival di Sanremo 2002), officially the 52nd Italian Song Festival (52º Festival della canzone italiana), was the 52nd annual Sanremo Music Festival, held at the Teatro Ariston in Sanremo between 5 and 9 March 2002 and broadcast by Radiotelevisione italiana (RAI). The show was presented by Pippo Baudo (who also served as the artistic director of the festival), assisted by Manuela Arcuri and Vittoria Belvedere.

The winner of the Big Artists section was the band Matia Bazar with the song "Messaggio d'amore", while Daniele Silvestri won the Critics Award with the song "Salirò". Anna Tatangelo won the Newcomers section with the song "Doppiamente fragili".

After every night, Simona Ventura and Francesco Giorgino hosted Dopofestival, a talk show about the Festival with the participation of singers and journalists.

== Participants and results ==
=== Big Artists ===
Big Artists section
Song	Artist(s)	Songwriter(s)	Rank	Notes
"Messaggio d'amore"	Matia Bazar	Giancarlo Golzi; Piero Cassano	1	Winner of the "Big Artists" section
"Dimmi come..."	Alexia	Alessia Aquilani; Massimo Marcolini	2	Volare Award for Best Music
"Un altro amore"	Gino Paoli	Gino Paoli	3	Volare Award for Best Lyrics
"Ora che ho bisogno di te"	Fausto Leali & Luisa Corna	Fabrizio Berlincioni; Fausto Leali; Vladi Tosetto	4	
"Primavera a Sarajevo"	Enrico Ruggeri	Enrico Ruggeri	5	
"Il cuore mio"	Mariella Nava	Mariella Nava	6	
"Amarti sì"	Filippa Giordano	Lucio Quarantotto; Alessandro Napoletano	7	
"Tracce di te"	Francesco Renga	Francesco Renga	8	
"Accidenti a te"	Fiordaliso	Giancarlo Bigazzi; Marco Falagiani	9	
"Ogni giorno di più"	Gazosa	Maria Grazia Zenîma Granieri; Sandro Sichel; Rocco Siani	10	
"Gli angeli"	Michele Zarrillo	Vincenzo Incenzo; Michele Zarrillo; Romolo Amici	11	
"Lacrime dalla Luna"	Gianluca Grignani	Gianluca Grignani	12	
"Del perduto amore"	Alessandro Safina	Guido Morra; Maurizio Fabrizio	13	
"Salirò"	Daniele Silvestri	Daniele Silvestri	14	Mia Martini Critics Award
"Marì"	Nino D'Angelo	Nino D'Angelo; Nuccio Tortora; Philip Leon	15	
"L'immenso"	Patty Pravo	Lara Tempestini; Roberto Pacco; Fabrizio Carraresi	16	
"Dimmi che mi ami"	Loredana Bertè	Domenico Latino; Nuccio Tortora; Philip Leon	17	
"La mia canzone"	Mino Reitano	Pasquale Panella; Mino Reitano; Alterisio Paoletti	18	
"Batte forte"	Lollipop	Vanni Giorgilli; Luigi Rana; Antonio Blescia	19	
"Casa mia"	Timoria	Omar Pedrini	20	

=== Newcomers ===
Newcomers section
Song	Artist(s)	Songwriter(s)	Rank	Notes
"Doppiamente fragili"	Anna Tatangelo	Marco Del Freo; Luca Chiaravalli; David Marchetti	1	Winner of the Newcomers' section
"Il passo silenzioso della neve"	Valentina Giovagnini	Vincenzo Incenzo; Davide Pinelli	2	Volare Award for Best Arrangement
"Se poi mi chiami"	Simone Patrizi	Francesco Fiumara	3	
"Ricomincerei"	Gianni Fiorellino	Antonio Casaburi; Gianni Fiorellino	4	
"La marcia dei santi"	Archinuè	Francesco Sciacca	5	Winner of the Mia Martini Critics Award - Newcomers' section
"Fotografia"	78 Bit	Novi; Monticelli; Franco Serafini; Pasini; Dionigi; Pilato	6	
"Che ne so"	Marco Morandi	Marco Morandi; Franco Godi	7	
"Siamo treni"	Botero	Luigi Santoro; Francesco Riccardi	8	
"All'infinito"	Andrea Febo	Alessandra Carnevali; Andrea Febo; Stefano Profeta	9	
"Non finirà"	Daniele Vit	Daniele Vit; Lello Panico	10	
"Fruscio"	Plastico 6	Diana Tejera; Stefano Galafate	Eliminated	
"Ho mangiato la mia ragazza"	La Sintesi	Raffaele Battista	Eliminated	
"Odore"	Giuliodorme	Andrea Moscianese; Daniele Silvestri	Eliminated	
"Quando una ragazza c'è"	Offside	Antonello De Sanctis; Francesco Arpino	Eliminated	
"Sarà la primavera"	Dual Gang	Gino Magurno; Silvio Magurno; Paolo Bianco	Eliminated	
"You And Me"	Giacomo Celentano	Mario Ferrara; Michele Galasso; F. L. Garilli; Giacomo Celentano	Eliminated	

== Guests ==
Guests
Artist(s)	Song(s)
Kylie Minogue	"In Your Eyes"
Alanis Morissette	"Hands Clean"
Anastacia	"Paid My Dues"
Sarah Connor	"From Sarah with Love"
Gabrielle	"Out of Reach"
Shakira	"Whenever, Wherever"
Michael Bolton	"Solo una donna"
Destiny's Child	"Survivor"
Alicia Keys	"Ave Maria" "Fallin'"
Paulina Rubio	"Vive El Verano"
Britney Spears	"I'm Not a Girl, Not Yet a Woman"
The Corrs	"Breathless"
The Cranberries	"Analyse"
