= Carlo Marrale =

Italian singer, songwriter and musician

- Also known as: Bimbo
- Born: 15 March 1952 (age 73); Genoa, Italy
- Genres: Pop rock; prog rock; synth pop; jazz
- Occupations: Singer; guitarist; composer; songwriter
- Instruments: Vocals; guitar
- Years active: 1971–present

Carlo Marrale (born 15 March 1952) is an Italian singer, songwriter and musician.

== Early career and Jet ==
In 1971 Marrale co-founded with keyboardist Piero Cassano and bassist Aldo Stellita the progressive rock band Jet, in which he performed as guitarist and main vocalist. In 1972 the band released their debut album, Fede, speranza, carità (Faith, Hope and Charity). The following year they participated to the Sanremo Music Festival 1973 with the song "Anika na-o".

== Matia Bazar ==
In 1975, Jet expanded their line-up with the addition of vocalist Antonella Ruggiero and drummer Giancarlo Golzi and changed their name to Matia Bazar. Matia Bazar went on to become one the most popular Italian bands in the 1970s and the 1980s. Marrale co-wrote many of the band's songs and performed vocals duties, duetting with Ruggiero in several early hits of the group, such as "Stasera...che sera!" (1975), "Per un'ora d'amore" (1975), "Cavallo bianco" (1975), "Solo tu" (1977), "Raggio di luna" (1979), "C'è tutto un mondo intorno" (1979).

After Ruggiero's departure from Matia Bazar in 1989, Marrale continued his role as feature vocalist with the band's new lead singer Laura Valente.

== Solo career and other activities ==
In late 1993, Marrale left Matia Bazar to pursue a solo career. In 1994 he participated to the Sanremo Music Festival with "L'ascensore". On the same year, he released his first solo album Tra le dita la vita.

Marrale also wrote songs for artists like Irene Cara, Miguel Bosé, Mina, Pet Shop Boys, Queensrÿche. Marrale's song "Odissea" (2003) performed by renowned tenors Salvatore Licitra and Marcelo Álvarez peaked at No. 1 on the US charts.

In November 2007, Marrale released his second solo album, Melody Maker. It featured the track Controtendenza. The music video directed by Vince Ricotta.

Marrale is also a painter and a photographer.

== Discography ==
=== With Jet ===
- Fede, speranza, carità (1972)

=== With Matia Bazar ===
- Matia Bazar 1 (1976)
- Gran Bazar (1977)
- Semplicità (1978)
- Tournée (1979)
- Il tempo del sole (1980)
- Berlino, Parigi, Londra (1982)
- Tango (1983)
- Aristocratica (1984)
- Melanchòlia (1985)
- Melò (1987)
- Red Corner (1989)
- Anime pigre (1991)
- Dove le canzoni si avverano (1993)

=== Solo ===
- Tra le dita la vita (1994)
- Melody Maker (2007)
