= Aldo Stellita =

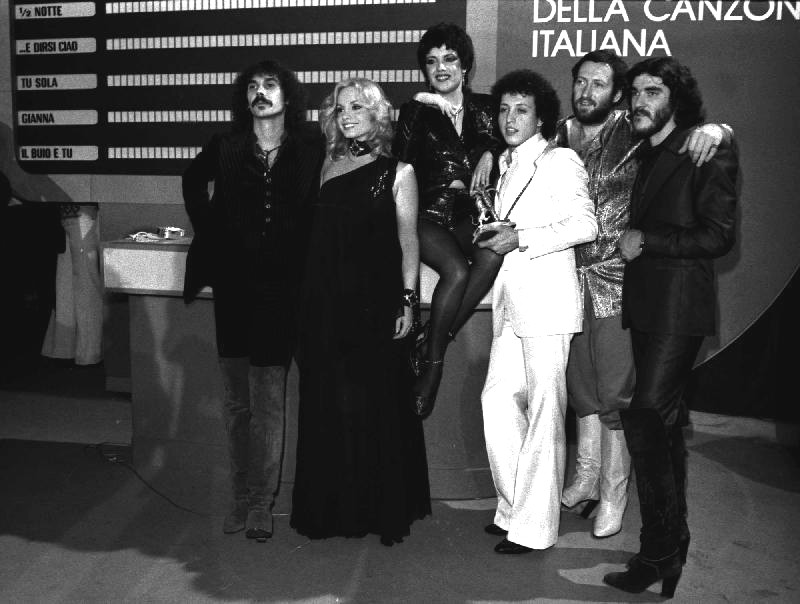

Background information
- Born: August 2, 1947; Campobello di Mazara, Italy
- Died: July 9, 1998 (aged 50) Udine, Italy
- Genres: Synth pop, Prog rock, Pop rock
- Occupations: Bassist, songwriter
- Instrument: Bass
- Years active: 1971-1998

Aldo Salvatore Stellita (August 2, 1947 – July 9, 1998), was an Italian bassist and songwriter, a founding member of the Genoan band Matia Bazar.

== Early career and Jet ==
A native of Sicily, Stellita moved to Bolzano at an early age. In 1971, shortly before getting his Chemistry degree, he founded in Genoa, with fellow musicians Piero Cassano and Carlo Marrale, the progressive rock band Jet. The band released an album, Fede, speranza, carità and unsuccessfully participated to the Sanremo Music Festival 1973 with the song Anika na-o.

== Matia Bazar ==
In 1975, vocalist Antonella Ruggiero and drummer Giancarlo Golzi joined Jet, resulting in a new band: Matia Bazar. During his two-decade journey with the band, Stellita was consistently credited for his pivotal role, writing the lyrics of virtually all the group's songs and being the overall creative force behind their musical experimentations, from progressive rock to electropop to pop rock, leading the group through fifteen studio albums, seven participations to the Sanremo Music Festival, one Eurovision Song Contest, world-wide tours, several lineup changes and national and international acclaim.

== Personal life and death ==
After a long relationship with bandmate Antonella Ruggiero (from 1981 to 1989), he married Simonetta Carri, with whom he had a son, Jodi (born 1994) .

Diagnosed with lung cancer in summer 1997, Stellita died from the disease on July 9, 1998, aged 50. He is buried in San Giorgio di Nogaro.

His place as a bassist in Matia Bazar was vacant for almost twenty years after his death, until Paola Zadra took it over in 2017.

== Discography ==
=== With Jet ===
- Fede, speranza, carità (1972)

=== With Matia Bazar ===
- Matia Bazar 1 (1976)
- Gran Bazar (1977)
- Semplicità (1978)
- Tournée (1979)
- Il tempo del sole (1980)
- Berlino, Parigi, Londra (1982)
- Tango (1983)
- Aristocratica (1984)
- Melanchòlia (1985)
- Melò (1987)
- Red Corner (1989)
- Anime pigre (1991)
- Dove le canzoni si avverano (1993)
- Radiomatia (1995)
- Benvenuti a Sausalito (1997)
