= Ariston Records =

- Founded: 1964
- Founder: Alfredo Rossi
- Defunct: 1989
- Genre: Pop
- Country of origin: Italy
- Location: Milan

Ariston Records was a record company established in Milan, Italy, by Alfredo Rossi (1925–2008). It was active from 1964 to 1989. It was part of the larger Ariston Group, which was founded in 1949 by Alfredo and his brother, the composer Carlo Alberto Rossi (1921–2010), and which included several publishing firms, recording studios, and a record pressing plant.

== Recording artists with the label and subsidiaries ==
Musicians who recorded for the label included I Corvi, Bruno Lauzi, Ornella Vanoni, Mino Reitano, Franco Califano, Tony Renis, Claudio Rocchi, and Donatella Rettore.

== Ariston labels ==
- Victory (it)
- First (it)
- Jet (it)
- Victory (it)

== Ariston's music publishing imprints ==
- Edizioni musicali Ariston (it)
- Santa Cecilia (namesake of Accademia Nazionale di Santa Cecilia, a music conservatory)
- Pettirosso
- M.E.C. [Music European Co.]
- Accademia
- First
- Formidable
- Regent
- Palace
