= Giancarlo Golzi =

- Born: February 10, 1952; Sanremo, Italy
- Died: August 12, 2015 (aged 63); Bordighera, Italy
- Genres: Prog rock, Synth pop, Pop rock
- Occupation(s): Drummer, songwriter, singer
- Instrument: Drums
- Years active: 1971–2015

Giancarlo Golzi (February 10, 1952 – August 12, 2015) was an Italian drummer and songwriter, a founding member of the Genoan band Matia Bazar.

== Early career and Museo Rosenbach ==
Golzi began his career in music as a drummer and percussionist for the Genoan band La Quinta Strada, which covered songs by artists like Jimi Hendrix and rock groups such as The Kinks, The Animals and Steppenwolf and by Rhythm & Blues stars like Otis Redding and Wilson Pickett.

In 1971, La Quinta Strada merged with Il Sistema into the progressive rock band Museo Rosenbach, whose first album Zarathustra (1973), while well received by fans, sold poorly because of controversy surrounding its alleged pro-Fascist lyrics.

== Matia Bazar ==
In 1975 Golzi joined forces with Genoan band JET and singer Antonella Ruggiero, resulting in a new band: Matia Bazar. During his forty-year-long journey with the band, Golzi not only acted as a drummer, but also wrote the lyrics for many of the band's hits, notably Vacanze romane, which earned them the Critics Award at the Sanremo Music Festival 1983.

The longest-tenured member of Matia Bazar, he was a pillar of the band, especially so after bandmate Aldo Stellita's death in 1998.

== Reunion with Museo Rosenbach and other projects ==
Alongside his work with Matia Bazar, in 1999 Golzi resumed his collaboration with newly-reformed Museo Rosenbach, releasing two more albums, Exit (2000) and Barbarica (2013).

He was artistic director of the Sanremo Academy, a contest aimed at young singers willing to participate to the Sanremo Music Festival.

In 2003 he was awarded the Lamezia Terme Prize for his text adaptation for the Italian-French musical Les Dix Commandements, by Elie Chouraqui.

== Death ==
On August 8, 2015, while on a tour with Matia Bazar to celebrate the band's 40th anniversary, Golzi performed for the last time at the Outlet Village Cilento in Eboli. On the night of August 12–13, he died of a heart attack in his home in Bordighera, aged 63.

Following Golzi's unexpected death, Matia Bazar temporarily disbanded, coming back with a new lineup in 2017.

== Discography ==
=== With Museo Rosenbach ===
- Zarathustra (1973)
- Exit (2000)
- Barbarica (2013)

=== With Matia Bazar ===
- Matia Bazar 1 (1976)
- Gran Bazar (1977)
- Semplicità (1978)
- Tournée (1979)
- Il tempo del sole (1980)
- Berlino, Parigi, Londra (1982)
- Tango (1983)
- Aristocratica (1984)
- Melanchòlia (1985)
- Melò (1987)
- Red Corner (1989)
- Anime pigre (1991)
- Dove le canzoni si avverano (1993)
- Radiomatia (1995)
- Benvenuti a Sausalito (1997)
- Brivido caldo (2000)
- Dolce canto (2001)
- Profili svelati (2005)
- One1 Two2 Three3 Four4 (2007)
- One1 Two2 Three3 Four4 – Volume 2 (2008)
- Conseguenza logica (2011)
