= Matia Bazar =

Italian pop band

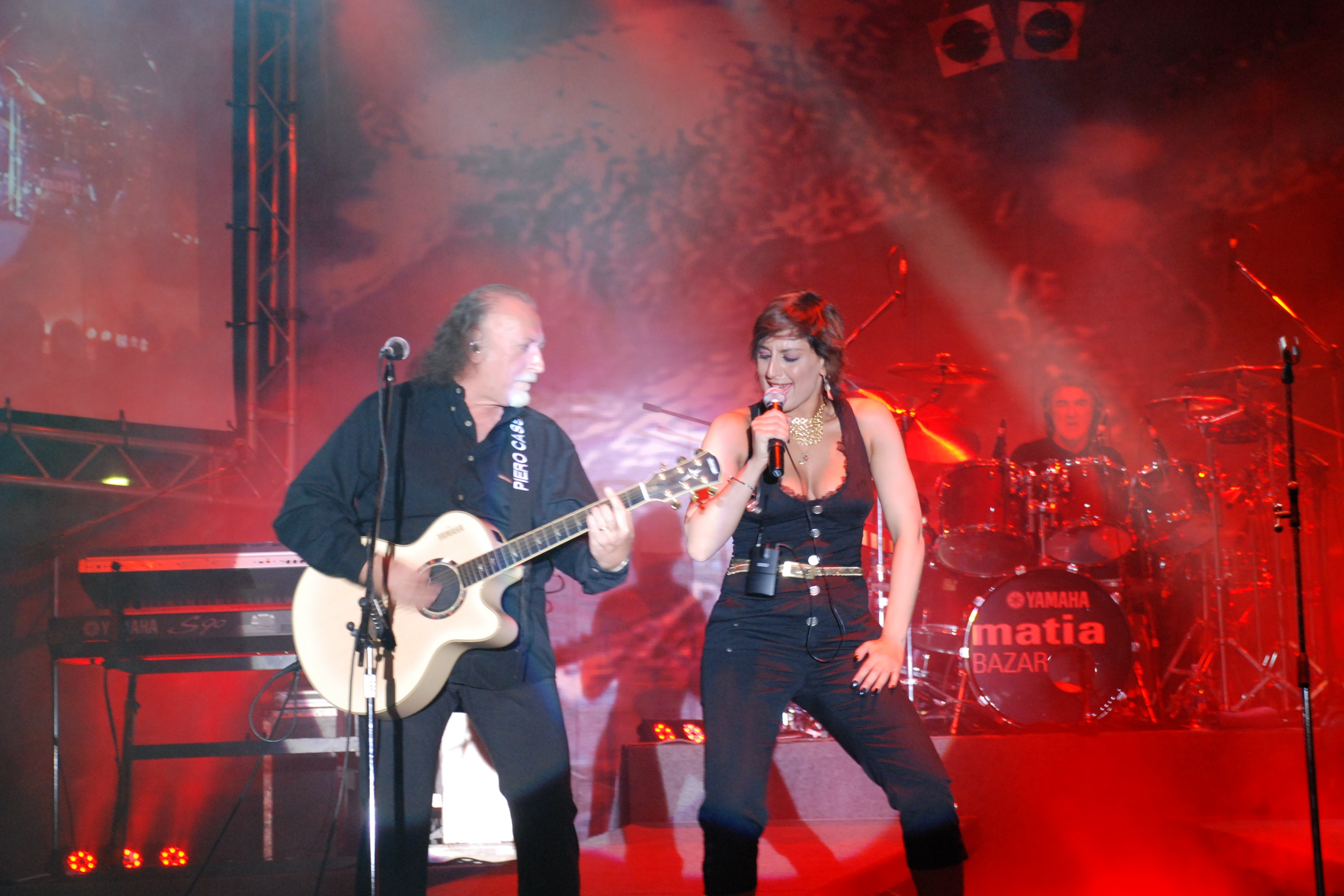
- Matia Bazar performing in June 2007. From left to right: Piero Cassano, Roberta Faccani, and Giancarlo Golzi

Background information
- Origin: Genoa, Italy
- Genres: Pop rock; synth-pop; new wave
- Years active: 1975–present
- Labels: Ariston; CGD
- Members: Fabio Perversi; Silvia Dragonieri; Silvio Melloni; Gino Zandonà; Piercarlo Tanzi
- Past members: see below
- Website: matiabazarofficial.com

Matia Bazar (Italian: [maˈtiːa badˈdzar, - baˈzar]) is an Italian pop band formed in Genoa in 1975. The original members of the group were Piero Cassano (keyboards), Aldo Stellita (bass), Carlo Marrale (guitar, vocals), Giancarlo Golzi (drums), and Antonella Ruggiero (vocals). They represented Italy in the Eurovision Song Contest 1979 with a song called "Raggio di luna". They are known for the quality of their female vocalists; after Ruggiero, vocalists included Laura Valente, Silvia Mezzanotte, Roberta Faccani, and Luna Dragonieri. Their major hits were "Solo tu" (1977), "Vacanze romane" (1982), and "Ti sento" (1985), which peaked on the charts in Belgium, Netherlands, and Italy. The group achieved several major successes, amongst which the win of two Sanremo Music Festivals in 1978 and in 2002.

Ruggiero and Marrale, the two main vocalists of the original line-up, left respectively in 1989 and 1994 to pursue solo careers. Main lyricist and bassist Stellita died in 1998 and drummer/writer Golzi in 2015. Cassano, the last original founding member, left in May 2017. As of 2024, none of the band’s original surviving members is part of the current lineup. The band is now led by keyboardist and multi-instrumentalist Fabio Perversi, who had joined in 1998 and has been endorsed by Cassano and Golzi to continue. According to Cassano, Matia Bazar "should survive to their original members".

== Personnel ==
=== Current members ===
- Fabio Perversi – vocals, keyboards, violin (1998–)
- Silvia Dragonieri – vocals (2017–)
- Silvio Melloni – bass (2021–)
- Gino Zandonà – guitars (2021–)
- Piercarlo Tanzi – drums (2021–)

=== Past members ===
- Piero Cassano – vocals, guitars, keyboards (founder, 1975–1981, 1999–2017)
- Giancarlo Golzi – drums (founder, 1975–2015 died 8.12.2015)
- Carlo Marrale – guitars, vocals (founder, 1975–1994)
- Antonella Ruggiero – vocals (founder, 1975–1989)
- Aldo Stellita – bass (founder, 1975–1998 died 7.9.1998)
- Mauro Sabbione – keyboards (1981–1984 died 12.21.2022)
- Sergio Cossu – keyboards (1984–1998)
- Laura Valente – vocals (1990–1998)
- Silvia Mezzanotte – vocals (1999–2004, 2010–2016)
- Roberta Faccani – vocals (2005–2010)
- Piero Marras – guitars (2017–2021)
- Paola Zadra – bass (2017–2021)
- Fiamma Cardani – drums (2017–2021)

== Discography ==
- Matia Bazar 1 (1976)
- Granbazar (1977)
- Semplicità (1978)
- Tournée (1979)
- Il tempo del sole (1980)
- Berlino, Parigi, Londra (1982)
- Tango (1983)
- Aristocratica (1984)
- Melanchólia (1985)
- Melò (1987)
- Red Corner (1989)
- Anime pigre (1991)
- Dove le canzoni si avverano (1993)
- Radiomatia (1995)
- Benvenuti a Sausalito (1997)
- Brivido caldo (2000)
- Dolce canto (2001)
- Profili svelati (2005)
- One1 Two2 Three3 Four4 (2007)
- One1 Two2 Three3 Four4 - Volume due (2008)
- Conseguenza logica (2011)

== Citations ==
Awards and achievements
Preceded by Homo Sapiens with "Bella da morire"	Sanremo Music Festival; Winner; 1978	Succeeded by Mino Vergnaghi with "Amare"
Preceded by Ricchi e Poveri with "Questo amore"	Italy in the Eurovision Song Contest; 1979	Succeeded by Alan Sorrenti with "Non so che darei"
Preceded by Elisa with "Luce (Tramonti a nord est)"	Sanremo Music Festival; Winner; 2002	Succeeded by Alexia with "Per dire di no"
