= Under the Desert Sky =

Live album (with DVD) by Andrea Bocelli
- Released: 7 November 2006
- Recorded: Lake Las Vegas, NV
- Genre: Pop
- Label: Sugar Records
- Producer: David Foster, Humberto Gatica, Tony Renis

Andrea Bocelli DVD video chronology
Credo: John Paul II (2006)	Under the Desert Sky (2006)	Vivere Live in Tuscany (2008)

Under the Desert Sky is a live album and DVD of a classical - pop concert by classical Italian tenor Andrea Bocelli. The concert was performed on a specially built floating stage at Lake Las Vegas Resort (near Las Vegas, Nevada) and taped for American television network PBS. It mostly featured songs from Bocelli's previous album, Amore. The package was released on 7 November 2006. It debuted and peaked on the U.S. Billboard 200 at number 11.

The DVD also includes interviews about the Amore album, of Bocelli and the producers, David Foster and Humberto Gatica, and was also nominated for an Emmy.

== Track listing ==
DVD
No.	Title	Writer(s)	Length
1.	"Amapola"	José María Lacalle García	3:46
2.	"Besame Mucho"	Consuelo Velázquez	4:22
3.	"Somos Novios (It's Impossible)"	Armando Manzanero Canché	5:52
4.	"Canzoni Stonate"	Giulio Rapetti; Aldo Donati	6:00
5.	"Pero Te Extraño"	Armando Manzanero Canché	4:14
6.	"L'Appuntamento"	Roberto Carlos; Erasmo Carlos; Bruno Lauzi	4:13
7.	"Estate"	Bruno Martino; Bruno Brighetti	4:02
8.	"September Morn"	Neil Diamond; Gilbert Bécaud	1:53
9.	"Can't Help Falling in Love"	Hugo Peretti; Luigi Creatore; George David Weiss	4:22
10.	"Mi Manchi"	Fabrizio Berlincioni; Franco Fasano	3:46
11.	"Jurame"	María Grever	3:40
12.	"Solamente Una Vez"	Agustín Lara	3:57
13.	"Les Feuilles Mortes (Autumn Leaves)"	Jacques Prévert; Joseph Kosma	5:30
14.	"Porque Tu Me Acostumbraste"	Frank Domínguez	3:23
15.	"Cuando Me Enamoro"	Mario Panzeri; Roberto Livraghi; Daniele Pace; Alfonso Alpin	4:05
16.	"The Prayer"	David Foster; Carole Bayer Sager	5:12
17.	"Momentos"	Tony Renis; Julio Iglesias	4:07
18.	"Because We Believe"	Andrea Bocelli; David Foster; Amy Foster Gillies	7:26
Total length:			1:19:50

CD
No.	Title	Writer(s)	Length
1.	"Besame Mucho"	Consuelo Velázquez	3:58
2.	"Cuando Me Enamoro"	Mario Panzeri; Roberto Livraghi; Daniele Pace; Alfonso Alpin	4:03
3.	"Estate" (feat. Chris Botti)	Bruno Martino; Bruno Brighetti	3:44
4.	"September Morn"	Neil Diamond; Gilbert Bécaud	1:14
5.	"Can't Help Falling in Love" (feat. Katharine McPhee)	Hugo Peretti; Luigi Creatore; George David Weiss	3:23
6.	"Canzoni Stonate" (feat. Stevie Wonder)	Giulio Rapetti; Aldo Donati	3:45
7.	"Momentos"	Tony Renis; Julio Iglesias	3:51
8.	"Somos Novios (It's Impossible)"	Armando Manzanero Canché	4:25
9.	"The Prayer" (feat. Heather Headley)	David Foster; Carole Bayer Sager	4:35
Total length:			32:58

== Charts ==
=== Weekly charts ===
Sales chart performance for Under the Desert Sky
Chart (2006)	Peak position
US Billboard 200	11
US Top R&B/Hip-Hop Albums (Billboard)	2

=== Year-end charts ===
Year-end chart performance for Under the Desert Sky
Chart (2007)	Position
US Billboard 200	101

== Certifications ==
Region	Certification	Certified units/sales
Brazil (Pro-Música Brasil) DVD edition	Platinum	30,000^{*}
Canada (Music Canada) As an audio album	Gold	50,000^{^}
United States (RIAA) As a video longform	Gold	50,000^{^}
^{*} Sales figures based on certification alone.^{^} Shipments figures based on certification alone.

== See also ==
- Amore, the album
