= Sanremo Music Festival 1980 =

Italian song contest (30th edition)

Dates and venue
- First night: 7 February 1980
- Second night: 8 February 1980
- Final night: 9 February 1980
- Venue: Teatro Ariston; Sanremo, Italy

Organisation
- Organiser: Gianni Ravera

Production
- Broadcaster: Radiotelevisione italiana (RAI)
- Director: Antonio Moretti
- Artistic director: Gianni Naso
- Presenters: Roberto Benigni and Claudio Cecchetto, Olimpia Carlisi

Vote
- Number of entries: 30
- Winner: "Solo noi" Toto Cutugno

The Sanremo Music Festival 1980 (Italian: Festival di Sanremo 1980), officially the 30th Italian Song Festival (30º Festival della canzone italiana), was the 30th annual Sanremo Music Festival, held at the Teatro Ariston in Sanremo between 7 and 9 February 1980. It was organised by Gianni Ravera under sponsorship from the municipality of Sanremo and broadcast by Radiotelevisione italiana (RAI). The shows were presented by the comedian Roberto Benigni, assisted by Claudio Cecchetto and Olimpia Carlisi.

The competing entries were split into categories for big and newcomer artists, with big artists given an automatic qualification to the final, while newcomers faced elimination. It was the first edition not to feature an orchestra in the venue, becoming the first of ten consecutive editions to do so. The winning song was "Solo noi" written and performed by Toto Cutugno.

== Format ==
In October 1979, Sanremo's municipal entertainment and events committee unanimously approved the appointment of Gianni Ravera as the organiser of the festival's 1980 edition, over proposals from Vittorio Salvetti, Angelo Piccarreta and Carlo Siena, following unanimous support from the city's political parties. The decision was later ratified by the city's municipal council, allowing Ravera to organise the festival for the second year in a row. Gianni Naso served as artistic director.

Ravera collaborated with record companies to devise a new set of regulations for the festival in November. For the first time since the 1974 edition, the competing entries were split into sections for big and newcomer artists. Twenty newcomers performed their songs during the first two nights facing elimination from the competition, while ten big artists automatically gained a spot in the final, performing during the first two nights without facing a vote. A preliminary competition titled Ribalta per il festival – Sanremo '80 was held on 15 and 16 January 1980 to determine which twenty newcomer artists from a list of forty were admitted into the festival.

=== Venue and stage design ===
The municipality initially intended to hold the festival in the Sanremo Casino following the completion of renovations to its ballroom in November, but since the ballroom would lack a stage upon completion and only have a seat capacity of five hundred, it was deemed unsuitable to serve as the venue. In October, the Sanremo municipal council determined that the Teatro Ariston, which had hosted the event since the 1977 edition, would remain as the venue, with 7–9 February 1980 set as the festival's dates.

The stage was designed by Gian Francesco Ramacci, modelled after a discotheque with two dance floors and numerous mirrors and flashing lights. Ramacci also designed a logo for the festival, featured prominently on stage as a backdrop and used on promotional posters, that resembles a coat of arms with flower bouquets and wings supporting the words "30º Sanremo" in red, blue and yellow. The venue did not feature an orchestra for the first time in the festival's history, with competing artists required to perform their songs to a backing track. The festival's artistic director, Gianni Naso, explained that the change was made to solve acoustic and vocal problems associated with live music during television broadcasts.

=== Voting ===
The voting for the shows was conducted by eight juries stationed in as many cities across Italy each containing ten members. The precise locations of the juries were kept secret until after the shows to prevent potential influence to jury members. The eight locations were revealed to be the Felino Castle in Felino, a Pro Loco institution in Coredo, a basketball club in Forlì, a dance club in Chiesina Uzzanese, an educational institution in Rome, a nightclub in Palermo, a hotel in Porto Recanati and a club in Grottaglie. Journalists were also invited to attend the voting procedure during the final for transparency.

In each of the first two nights, the juries voted to select five songs from the newcomers section to join the ten automatically qualified songs from the big artists section in the final. At the request of record companies, only the winning song was announced, with the full results kept secret and all other finalists officially declared tied runners-up.

== Selections ==
=== Ribalta per il festival – Sanremo '80 ===
A preliminary competition titled Ribalta per il festival – Sanremo '80 was held in the opera house of the Sanremo Casino across two shows on 15 and 16 January 1980 to select twenty entries to participate in the festival's newcomers section. The festival's organisers received 120 song submissions from record companies for the competition, of which forty were selected to participate by a commission chaired by Gianni Ravera on 12 January. During the event, twenty artists performed their songs in each show. Twenty jury members across two different juries, one composed of ten randomly drawn audience members and another composed of ten members appointed by the festival's organisers, including journalists and music industry experts, gave each song a score. The twenty songs that received the most points across both shows were selected to compete in the festival.

Qualifier

Ribalta per il festival – 15–16 January 1980
Song	Artist	Points	Place
"Non ti drogare"	Alberto Beltrami	155	8
"Passerà"	Alberto Cheli	166	3
"Canterò canterò canterò"	Aldo Donati	149	12
"Fammi male"	Angela	—N/a	
"Ti desidero"	Armonium	145	14
"Mara"	Bruno D'Andrea	146	13
"Tu sei la mia musica"	Coscarella e Polimeno	130	19
"Contessa"	Decibel	156	7
"Che meraviglia è"	Dorina Dato	—N/a	
"Ti voglio bene"	Enzo Malepasso	159	6
"Animale"	Fabio Morellato	—N/a	
"Piccola donna"	Family Affair	—N/a	
"Giglio di novembre"	Francesco Grossi	—N/a	
"Voglio l'erba voglio"	Francesco Magni	182	1
"Angela"	Fratelli Balestra	—N/a	
"Non mi lasciare mai"	Geremia Blue	—N/a	
"E pensare che una volta... non era così"	Gianfranco De Angelis	127	20
"Ma vai, vai!"	Giorgio Zito and Diesel	166	3
"Dal metrò a New York"	Henry Freis	150	11
"Buon compleanno"	La Fabbrica di Stelle	—N/a	
"Ritagli di luce"	Latte e Miele	152	10
"Ma tu chi sei"	Lelio D'Aprile	—N/a	
"Va' pensiero"	Linda Lee	155	8
"Tu che fai la moglie"	Luca Cola	168	2
"Dammi le mani"	Mela Lo Cicero	143	17
"Amor mio... sono me!"	Omelet	141	18
"Il sole canta"	Orlando Johnson	144	15
"Povero Cristo"	Panorama	—N/a	
"Cavallo bianco"	Paolo Riviera	162	5
"Tu mi manchi tanto"	Pino Leggeri	—N/a	
"Sentimento"	Riccardo Azzurri	—N/a	
"Angelo di seta"	Rimmel	144	15
"Vaffalà"	Roberto Carrino	—N/a	
"Oggi il sole è alto"	Roberto Donno	—N/a	
"Fossi un poco libero"	Sempre più epoca	—N/a	
"Fagioli"	Skiantos	—N/a	
"Adelaide"	Super Guy	—N/a	
"Dove diavolo dormirò"	Superquadro	—N/a	
"Luna park"	Thor	—N/a	
"Chissà"	Tony Moore	—N/a	

== Competing entries ==
Submissions for the competition were open to record companies until 9 January, with the festival's organisers receiving a total of 151 song submissions at the close of the deadline. The submissions were divided into categories for big and newcomer artists, with 31 designated for the big artists section and 120 designated for the newcomers section. A commission appointed by the festival's organisers met to select the ten entries competing in the big artists section on 16 January, while the twenty entries competing in the newcomers section were selected during the competition Ribalta per il festival – Sanremo '80 on 15 and 16 January.

The Indian-American artist Asha Puthli was initially announced as one of the festival's competing artists, included in the big artists section with the song "Se ti va", but she withdrew from the competition at the end of January. Press speculated that she had planned to perform at the festival only as a guest and her inclusion among the competing artists was the result of a misunderstanding. She was replaced by Peppino di Capri with the song "Tu, cioè...", which was reinstated after being rejected by the song selection commission.

◇ Entry withdrawn

Competing entries – Big Artists
Song	Artist	Songwriter(s)
"Se ti va" ◇	Asha Puthli ◇	—N/a
"Gelosia"	Bobby Solo	Roberto Satti; Dancio
"Mariù"	Gianni Morandi	Rosalino Cellamare; Francesco De Gregori
"Più di una canzone"	La Bottega dell'Arte	Piero Calabrese; Romano Musumarra
"Musica regina"	Leano Morelli	Leano Morelli; Silvano Fossati
"Tu mi manchi dentro"	Leroy Gómez	Renato Brioschi; Cristiano Minellono
"Tu, cioè..."	Peppino di Capri	Giuseppe Faiella; Depsa
"Su di noi"	Pupo	Enzo Ghinazzi; Donatella Milani; Paolo Barabani
"I Sing for You"	Sally Oldfield	Popi Fabrizio; Alberto Salerno
"L'italiano"	Stefano Rosso	Stefano Rosso
"Solo noi"	Toto Cutugno	Salvatore Cutugno

Competing entries – Newcomers
Song	Artist	Songwriter(s)
"Non ti drogare"	Alberto Beltrami	Alberto Beltrami; Gaio Chiocchio
"Passerà"	Alberto Cheli	Antonio Coggio; Marco Luberti
"Canterò canterò canterò"	Aldo Donati	Aldo Donati
"Ti desidero"	Armonium	Franco Zulian; Claudio Scotti Galletta; Paolo Barabani; Piero Martoglio
"Mara"	Bruno D'Andrea	Bruno Tavernese; Luigi Albertelli
"Tu sei la mia musica"	Coscarella e Polimeno	Aldo Coscarella; Diego Polimeno; Adelio Cogliati
"Contessa"	Decibel	Fulvio Muzio; Enrico Ruggeri
"Ti voglio bene"	Enzo Malepasso	Enzo Malepasso; Depsa
"Voglio l'erba voglio"	Francesco Magni	Francesco Magni
"E pensare che una volta... non era così"	Gianfranco De Angelis	Sandro Spasiano; Amerigo Cassella
"Ma vai, vai!"	Giorgio Zito and Diesel	Giorgio Bennato
"Dal metrò a New York"	Henry Freis	Sandro Giacobbe
"Ritagli di luce"	Latte e Miele	Luciano Poltini; Luigi Albertelli
"Va' pensiero"	Linda Lee	Pippo Caruso; Rossana Barbieri; Silvestro Longo
"Tu che fai la moglie"	Luca Cola	Enrico Intra; Marinko Rigaldi
"Dammi le mani"	Mela Lo Cicero	Franco Chiaravalle
"Amor mio... sono me!"	Omelet	Pino Scarpettini; Tony Rosati; Angelo Piccarreta
"Il sole canta"	Orlando Johnson	Giovanni Ullu; Nicoletta Artom
"Cavallo bianco"	Paolo Riviera	Riccardo Aglietti; Vanya Magelli
"Angelo di seta"	Rimmel	Remy Guidè; Gianni Dell'Orso; Claudio Colitti

== Shows ==
Decibel performing their song "Contessa" during the festival

The festival consisted of three shows held between 7 and 9 February 1980. The shows were presented by the comedian Roberto Benigni, assisted by the disc jockey Claudio Cecchetto and the actress Olimpia Carlisi. The first two nights were divided into two parts; the first parts were broadcast only on radio, while the second parts were broadcast only on television and presented as a summary of the nights' results hosted solely by Claudio Cecchetto, containing the five qualifiers from the newcomers section and the five automatic qualifiers from the big artists section. A draw took place on 29 January to determine the running orders for the first two nights. The shows were directed by Antonio Moretti.

=== First night ===
The first night was held on 7 February 1980. Ten newcomers and five big artists performed their songs, with five newcomers selected for the final.

Qualifier

Newcomers – 7 February 1980
R/O	Song	Artist	Result
1	"Tu che fai la moglie"	Luca Cola	—N/a
2	"Dal metrò a New York"	Henry Freis	—N/a
3	"Il sole canta"	Orlando Johnson	Qualified
4	"Canterò canterò canterò"	Aldo Donati	Qualified
5	"Amor mio... sono me!"	Omelet	—N/a
6	"Voglio l'erba voglio"	Francesco Magni	Qualified
7	"Ti desidero"	Armonium	—N/a
8	"Contessa"	Decibel	Qualified
9	"Va' pensiero"	Linda Lee	Qualified
10	"Tu sei la mia musica"	Coscarella e Polimeno	—N/a

Big Artists – 7 February 1980
R/O	Song	Artist
1	"Solo noi"	Toto Cutugno
2	"Più di una canzone"	La Bottega dell'Arte
3	"Mariù"	Gianni Morandi
4	"I Sing for You"	Sally Oldfield
5	"L'italiano"	Stefano Rosso

=== Second night ===
The second night was held on 8 February 1980. Ten newcomers and five big artists performed their songs, with five newcomers selected for the final.

Qualifier

Newcomers – 8 February 1980
R/O	Song	Artist	Result
1	"Angelo di seta"	Rimmel	—N/a
2	"Ti voglio bene"	Enzo Malepasso	Qualified
3	"Non ti drogare"	Alberto Beltrami	—N/a
4	"E pensare che una volta... non era così"	Gianfranco De Angelis	—N/a
5	"Cavallo bianco"	Paolo Riviera	Qualified
6	"Ritagli di luce"	Latte e Miele	—N/a
7	"Passerà"	Alberto Cheli	Qualified
8	"Mara"	Bruno D'Andrea	Qualified
9	"Ma vai, vai!"	Giorgio Zito and Diesel	Qualified
10	"Dammi le mani"	Mela Lo Cicero	—N/a

Big Artists – 8 February 1980
R/O	Song	Artist
1	"Tu, cioè..."	Peppino di Capri
2	"Tu mi manchi dentro"	Leroy Gómez
3	"Musica regina"	Leano Morelli
4	"Su di noi"	Pupo
5	"Gelosia"	Bobby Solo

=== Final night ===
The final night was held on 9 February 1980. The twenty finalists performed their songs again and a winner was chosen.

Performances by guest artists during the show included Pippo Franco performing "La puntura", Sheila and B. Devotion performing "Spacer", Billy Preston and Syreeta performing "With You I'm Born Again", Suzi Quatro performing "Stumblin' In", Sylvester performing "Can't Stop Dancing", David Zed performing "R.O.B.O.T.", Dionne Warwick performing "I'll Never Love This Way Again" and Status Quo performing "Whatever You Want". Presenter Roberto Benigni also performed his song "Pantheon" during the show.

The winning song was "Solo noi" written and performed by Toto Cutugno. Although only the festival's winner was announced officially and all other finalists were declared tied runners-up, rumours spread since the event suggest "Ti voglio bene" performed by Enzo Malepasso placed second and "Su di noi" performed by Pupo placed third.

Winner

Final night – 9 February 1980
R/O	Song	Artist
	"Canterò canterò canterò"	Aldo Donati
	"Cavallo bianco"	Paolo Riviera
	"Contessa"	Decibel
	"Gelosia"	Bobby Solo
	"I Sing for You"	Sally Oldfield
	"Il sole canta"	Orlando Johnson
	"L'italiano"	Stefano Rosso
	"Ma vai, vai!"	Giorgio Zito and Diesel
	"Mara"	Bruno D'Andrea
	"Mariù"	Gianni Morandi
	"Musica regina"	Leano Morelli
	"Passerà"	Alberto Cheli
	"Più di una canzone"	La Bottega dell'Arte
	"Solo noi"	Toto Cutugno
	"Su di noi"	Pupo
	"Ti voglio bene"	Enzo Malepasso
	"Tu mi manchi dentro"	Leroy Gómez
	"Tu, cioè..."	Peppino di Capri
	"Va' pensiero"	Linda Lee
	"Voglio l'erba voglio"	Francesco Magni

== Broadcasts ==
=== Local broadcast ===
The first two nights were divided into two parts. The first parts were broadcast on Rai Radio 1, beginning at 20:30 CET during the first night and 21:03 CET during the second night, while the second parts were broadcast on Rete Uno lasting thirty minutes each, beginning at 22:00 CET during the first night and 23:00 CET during the second night. The final was broadcast in one part on both Rai Radio 1 and Rete Uno beginning at 20:40 CET. The final was broadcast on television to an estimated 18.3 million viewers in Italy.

=== International broadcasts ===
The final was broadcast abroad via the Eurovision network. Known details on the broadcasts in each country, including the specific broadcasting stations and commentators are shown in the tables below.

International broadcasters of the Sanremo Music Festival 1980
Country	Broadcaster	Channel(s)	Commentator(s)	Ref(s)
Chile	UCTV	Canal 13 (Note: Delayed broadcast on 26 February 1980 at 21:30 (CLST))		
Romania	TVR	Programul 1 (Note: Delayed broadcast in a shortened format on 23 March 1980 at 21:45 (EET))		

== Incidents and controversies ==
=== Controversial on-air remarks ===
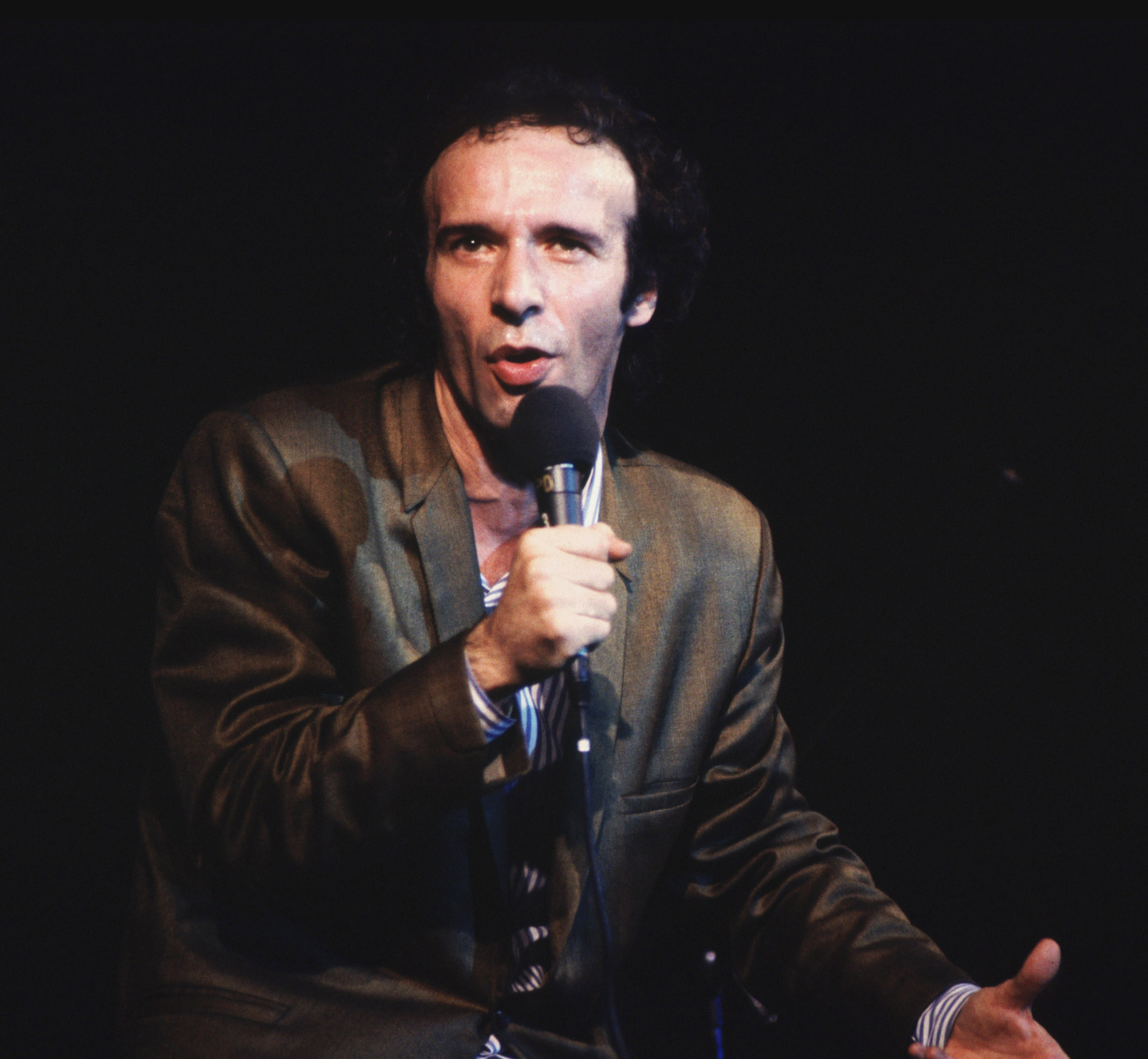
Roberto Benigni (pictured in 1990) generated controversy as the festival's main presenter

The festival's main presenter, actor and comedian Roberto Benigni, became the subject of controversy after the festival due to comedic remarks and stunts he made during the final. Among his actions while hosting the show were stealing a photographer's camera, making fun of numerous politicians, jumping on the shoulders of a cameraman and forgetting to introduce two of the artists, with the most controversial being a comedic monologue in which he spoke about making love freely, referring to Pope John Paul II by the derogatory nickname "Wojtylaccio", and proceeding to kiss his partner and co-host Olimpia Carlisi for around forty seconds, which went on to receive a mixed reaction from the audience in the hall.

Shortly after the festival, a group of christian democrat members of parliament signed a letter to the Minister of Posts and Telecommunications in protest of Benigni's remarks towards the pope during the event, also submitting a formal inquiry to the chair of the RAI supervisory commission into what measures would be taken to prevent "a recurrence of television broadcasts like the one featuring Benigni on the 9th of this month". The inquiry described his remarks during the show as "vulgar and disrespectful expressions regarding the pontiff that offended the dignity that must govern the public service provided by RAI". In April, Benigni was summoned to the Palace of Justice in Rome following an examination of public complaints against him for the remarks, in which he stated he had no intention of disrespecting the pope and explained that the "-accio" suffix is most commonly used to convey affection in Tuscany, his region of origin. In December, he was acquitted of the charge by a public prosecutor in Sanremo.

== Reception ==
The festival's 1980 edition received a mostly positive reception in comparison to preceding editions. Roberto Benigni's role as the festival's presenter received particular praise from the press, with many agreeing that he was the most memorable part of the event. The festival experienced a surge in public interest for the edition, attributed in part to the modern lyrical themes within the competing songs and Benigni's hosting, leading to the perception that the festival could undergo a revival in popularity. The edition's success also led to RAI's decision later in the year to broadcast all three nights of the festival's 1981 edition on television in full for the first time since 1972.
