= Sanremo Music Festival 1981 =

Italian song contest (31st edition)

Dates and venue
- First night: 5 February 1981
- Second night: 6 February 1981
- Final night: 7 February 1981
- Venue: Teatro Ariston; Sanremo, Italy

Organisation
- Organiser: Gianni Ravera

Production
- Broadcaster: Radiotelevisione italiana (RAI)
- Director: Antonio Moretti
- Artistic director: Gianni Naso
- Presenters: Claudio Cecchetto; Eleonora Vallone; Nilla Pizzi (final)

Vote
- Number of entries: 28
- Winner: "Per Elisa"; Alice

The Sanremo Music Festival 1981 (Italian: Festival di Sanremo 1981), officially the 31st Italian Song Festival (31º Festival della canzone italiana), was the 31st annual Sanremo Music Festival, held at the Teatro Ariston in Sanremo between 5 and 7 February 1981. It was organised by Gianni Ravera under sponsorship from the municipality of Sanremo and broadcast by Radiotelevisione italiana (RAI). The shows were hosted by the disc jockey Claudio Cecchetto and the actress Eleonora Vallone, assisted in the final by the singer Nilla Pizzi, who won the festival in 1951 and 1952. The winning song was "Per Elisa" written by Franco Battiato, Giusto Pio and Alice, and performed by Alice herself.

Following the positive reception to the previous edition, RAI returned to broadcasting the festival on television in its entirety for the first time since 1972. The decision further contributed to the event's revival in popularity and to the commercial success of several songs from the edition both in Italy and abroad, including "Sarà perché ti amo" performed by Ricchi e Poveri, the winning song, "Per Elisa" performed by Alice, and the runner-up "Maledetta primavera" performed by Loretta Goggi. The edition was also marked by two controversies, which involved the departure of Marina Occhiena from Ricchi e Poveri and the last-minute withdrawal of the comedian Massimo Troisi from the final.

== Format ==
In October 1980, both Sanremo's municipal entertainment and events committee and municipal council unanimously approved the appointment of Gianni Ravera as the festival's organiser for the 1981 edition, allowing him to serve in the role for the third consecutive year. Additionally, the Teatro Ariston was chosen as the event's venue and 5–7 February 1981 were set as the dates. Gianni Naso served as artistic director.

In December, the festival's organisers released a list of regulations for the competition. In contrast to the previous edition, which contained sections for newcomers and big artists, the competing entries were instead divided into two groups: Group A and Group B. The only requirement for Group A was that artists must have sold one record before 31 August 1980, while Group B consisted of established or well-known Italian and foreign artists. Artists from Group A performed their songs during the first two nights facing elimination from the competition, while artists from Group B automatically gained a spot in the final, performing during the first two nights without facing a vote. As in the previous edition, competing artists were required to perform their songs to a backing track.

The stage and scenography in the Teatro Ariston were designed by Enzo Somigli and Italo Bonfanti, consisting of a large metal hall with two illuminated staircases and raised platforms intended for bands to perform on. The festival's logo, which was designed to resemble a compass rose with the words "31º Sanremo" in front of palm trees and the Sanremo Casino, was placed at the back of the stage. The ballroom of the Sanremo Casino was used as a second venue for the event, intermittently shown throughout the shows with performances from guest artists and interviews with audience members. The set of the ballroom was designed by Rino Ceriolo under the theme "grand gala at the casino" featuring a backdrop with a sea, palm trees and sails.

=== Voting ===
The voting across the shows was conducted by eight juries stationed in as many locations across Italy each containing ten members. The juries were presided over by the Roman lawyer Giorgio Assumma, with their locations kept confidential until the end of the final to prevent potential influence to jury members. The locations were revealed to be in Dimaro, Tarquinia, Reggio Emilia, Imperia, Senigallia, Pistoia, Forlì and Calitri. In both of the first two nights, the juries voted to select four songs from Group A to join the twelve automatically qualified songs from Group B in the final. After the juries voted during the final, the songs that placed in the top three were revealed at the end of the show.

== Competing entries ==
Record companies were able to submit unreleased songs written by Italian songwriters for the competition until 13 January 1981, with Italian artists required to perform their songs in a language native to Italy, while foreign artists were free to perform in another languages. By the close of the deadline, 116 song submissions had been submitted by twenty-one record companies. The municipality of Sanremo entrusted the festival's organiser, Gianni Ravera, with the responsibility of selecting a total of twenty-four submissions for the competition: sixteen for Group A and eight for Group B. Ravera announced the list of twenty-eight competing entries on 19 January, increasing the number of entries in Group B from eight to twelve due to the high submission quality.

Shortly after the list of competing entries was released, the festival's organisers announced that Mia Martini, who was set to perform the song "E ancora canto" and designated into Group A, withdrew from the competition due to illness and would be replaced by Domenico Mattia with the song "Tulilemble". Additionally, the band La Bottega dell'Arte, who were set to perform the song "Vecchio rock" and also designated into Group A, were withdrawn by their record label and replaced by Orietta Berti with the song "La barca non va più".

◇ Entry withdrawn

Competing entries – Group A
| Song | Artist | Songwriter(s) |
|---|---|---|
| "Tulilemble" | Domenico Mattia | Renato Brioschi; Massimo Chiodi; Domenico Mattia |
| "Ancora" | Eduardo De Crescenzo | Claudio Mattone; Franco Migliacci |
| "Amore mio" | Enzo Malepasso | Vincenzo Malepasso; Depsa |
| "Caffè nero bollente" | Fiorella Mannoia | Mimmo Cavallo; Rosario De Cola |
| "Un'isola alle Hawaii" | Franco Fasano | Franco Fasano; Depsa |
| "Che brutto affare" | Jo Chiarello | Alberto Varano; Franco Califano |
| "Vecchio rock" ◇ | La Bottega dell'Arte ◇ | Piero Calabrese; Romano Musumarra; Massimo Calabrese; ◇ |
| "Roma spogliata" | Luca Barbarossa | Luca Barbarossa |
| "Ma chi te lo fa fare" | Marinella | Gian Pietro Felisatti; Vito Pallavicini |
| "E ancora canto" ◇ | Mia Martini ◇ | Mia Martini ◇ |
| "Su quel pianeta libero" | Michele Zarrillo | Totò Savio; Michele Zarrillo; Amerigo Cassella |
| "Guerriero" | Opera | Antonello Barrilà |
| "La barca non va più" | Orietta Berti | Pippo Caruso; Bruno Lauzi |
| "Hop, hop somarello" | Paolo Barabani | Paolo Barabani; Enzo Ghinazzi; Gian Piero Reverberi |
| "Bianca stella" | Sebastiano Occhino | Sebastiano Occhino; Luigi Albertelli |
| "Io mi..." | Stefano Tosi | Stefano Tosi; Carlo D'Apruzzo; Mirco Filistrucchi |
| "Toccami" | Tom Hooker | Gian Pietro Felisatti |
| "Mille volte ti amo" | Umberto Napolitano | Umberto Napolitano |

Competing entries – Group B
| Song | Artist | Songwriter(s) |
|---|---|---|
| "Per Elisa" | Alice | Franco Battiato; Giusto Pio; Alice |
| "Non posso perderti" | Bobby Solo | Roberto Satti; Danilo Ciotti |
| "Follow Me (Se amore vuoi)" | Carmen & Thompson | Phil Carmen; Mike Thompson; Luciano Angeleri |
| "I ragazzi che si amano" | Collage | Angelo Valsiglio; Collage; Daiano |
| "Tu cosa fai stasera?" | Dario Baldan Bembo | Dario Baldan Bembo; Amerigo Cassella |
| "Questo amore non si tocca" | Gianni Bella | Giancarlo Bigazzi; Gianni Bella |
| "Angela" | Leano Morelli | Leano Morelli; Flaviano Mologni; Manrico Mologni |
| "Maledetta primavera" | Loretta Goggi | Totò Savio; Amerigo Cassella |
| "Pensa per te" | Marcella | Giancarlo Bigazzi; Gianni Bella |
| "Midnight" | Passengers | Gesualdo Arena; Angelo Piccarreta |
| "Sarà perché ti amo" | Ricchi e Poveri | Dario Farina; Enzo Ghinazzi; Daniele Pace |
| "Tutto è blu" | Sterling St. Jacques | Vitaliano Caruso; Pier Michele Bozzetti |

== Shows ==
The festival consisted of three shows held between 5 and 7 February 1981. The shows were presented by the disc jockey Claudio Cecchetto, who served in the role for the second year in a row, and the actress Eleonora Vallone. During the final, they were assisted by the singer Nilla Pizzi, who won the festival's first two editions held in 1951 and 1952. Segments from the Sanremo Casino were hosted by Franco Solfiti. Cecchetto also wrote and recorded the song "Gioca Jouer" to serve as a theme song for the festival, featured at the start of each show accompanied by a dance routine performed on stage and in videos filmed at various locations in Sanremo. The song "Colombina" recorded by the chamber orchestra Rondò Veneziano was used as the festival's opening and closing theme. The shows were directed by Antonio Moretti.

The actor and comedian Massimo Troisi was originally slated to appear during the festival's final, having been scheduled to perform three stand-up comedy interludes and listed in the show's opening credits, but he withdrew from the role shortly before he was set to perform. Ahead of the show, RAI requested Troisi provide them with the scripts for his monologues, but he instead provided them with only the topics he planned to discuss, which included politics, religion and the 1980 Irpinia earthquake. On the day of the final, RAI informed him that after reviewing the topics he had planned, would allow him to perform only one monologue limited to topics related to music, causing him to withdraw from the event in protest. The actor and singer Telly Savalas was also scheduled to appear during the festival as a guest performer, but he withdrew before the start of the event due to an injury and was replaced with the singer Stephen Schlaks.

=== First night ===
The first night was held on 5 February 1981. Eight artists from Group A and six artists from Group B performed their songs, with four artists from Group A selected for the final.

Guest performances during the show included Mario Merola performing "Zappatore" and "Chiamate Napoli 081" from the Sanremo Casino, I Gufi performing "Pazzesco", Bad Manners performing "Lorraine", and Barry White performing "You're the First, the Last, My Everything".

Qualifier

Group A – 5 February 1981
| R/O | Song | Artist | Result |
|---|---|---|---|
| 1 | "Un'isola alle Hawaii" | Franco Fasano | —N/a |
| 2 | "Mille volte ti amo" | Umberto Napolitano | —N/a |
| 3 | "La barca non va più" | Orietta Berti | Qualified |
| 4 | "Ancora" | Eduardo De Crescenzo | Qualified |
| 5 | "Amore mio" | Enzo Malepasso | —N/a |
| 6 | "Caffè nero bollente" | Fiorella Mannoia | Qualified |
| 7 | "Bianca stella" | Sebastiano Occhino | —N/a |
| 8 | "Roma spogliata" | Luca Barbarossa | Qualified |

Group B – 5 February 1981
| R/O | Song | Artist |
|---|---|---|
| 1 | "Angela" | Leano Morelli |
| 2 | "Follow Me (Se amore vuoi)" | Carmen & Thompson |
| 3 | "Non posso perderti" | Bobby Solo |
| 4 | "Maledetta primavera" | Loretta Goggi |
| 5 | "Midnight" | Passengers |
| 6 | "Questo amore non si tocca" | Gianni Bella |

=== Second night ===
The second night was held on 6 February 1981. Eight artists from Group A and six artists from Group B performed their songs, with four artists from Group A selected for the final.

Guest performances during the show included Lio performing "Amoureux solitaires" from the Sanremo Casino, Stephen Schlaks performing "Sensitive and Delicate" from the Sanremo Casino, Lando Buzzanca performing "Ma che sei stata tu", Robert Palmer performing "Johnny and Mary", and Dire Straits performing "Romeo and Juliet".

Qualifier

Group A – 6 February 1981
| R/O | Song | Artist | Result |
|---|---|---|---|
| 1 | "Guerriero" | Opera | —N/a |
| 2 | "Io mi..." | Stefano Tosi | Qualified |
| 3 | "Hop, hop somarello" | Paolo Barabani | Qualified |
| 4 | "Tulilemble" | Domenico Mattia | —N/a |
| 5 | "Su quel pianeta libero" | Michele Zarrillo | Qualified |
| 6 | "Ma chi te lo fa fare" | Marinella | Qualified |
| 7 | "Che brutto affare" | Jo Chiarello | —N/a |
| 8 | "Toccami" | Tom Hooker | —N/a |

Group B – 6 February 1981
| R/O | Song | Artist |
|---|---|---|
| 1 | "Tu cosa fai stasera?" | Dario Baldan Bembo |
| 2 | "Pensa per te" | Marcella |
| 3 | "Sarà perché ti amo" | Ricchi e Poveri |
| 4 | "I ragazzi che si amano" | Collage |
| 5 | "Tutto è blu" | Sterling St. Jacques |
| 6 | "Per Elisa" | Alice |

=== Final night ===
Alice performing the winning song "Per Elisa" during the festival

The final night was held on 7 February 1981. The twenty finalists performed their songs again and a winner was chosen.

Guest performances during the show included Milva performing "La rossa" from the Sanremo Casino, Robert Palmer performing "Johnny and Mary", Barry White performing "Just the Way You Are", Bad Manners performing "Lorraine", Alberto Sordi performing "E va'... e va'...", Charles Aznavour performing "Poi passa", Dire Straits performing "Tunnel of Love", and Stephen Schlaks performing "Blue Dolphin" from the Sanremo Casino.

The winning song was "Per Elisa" performed by Alice, with "Maledetta primavera" performed by Loretta Goggi placing second and "Tu cosa fai stasera?" performed by Dario Baldan Bembo placing third. Only the top three songs were announced and reprised at the end of the show, however, the magazine TV Sorrisi e Canzoni later unofficially announced the rest of the top ten, placing Luca Barbarossa in fourth, followed by Ricchi e Poveri, Paolo Barabani, Marinella, Michele Zarrillo, Marcella and Passengers.

A number of the competing songs went on to achieve substantial commercial success after the festival both in Italy and abroad, including "Sarà perché ti amo" performed by Ricchi e Poveri, the winning song "Per Elisa" and the runner-up "Maledetta primavera", in addition to the festival's theme song "Gioca Jouer", which all reached number one on Italian singles charts during the year. The festival's official compilation album, titled Tutto Sanremo '81 and released by PolyGram, also experienced success and became one of the highest-selling albums of the year in Italy.

Winner

Final night – 7 February 1981
| R/O | Song | Artist | Points | Place |
|---|---|---|---|---|
| | "Ancora" | Eduardo De Crescenzo | —N/a | |
| | "Angela" | Leano Morelli | —N/a | |
| | "Caffè nero bollente" | Fiorella Mannoia | —N/a | |
| | "Follow Me (Se amore vuoi)" | Carmen & Thompson | —N/a | |
| | "Hop, hop somarello" | Paolo Barabani | —N/a | |
| | "I ragazzi che si amano" | Collage | —N/a | |
| | "Io mi..." | Stefano Tosi | —N/a | |
| | "La barca non va più" | Orietta Berti | —N/a | |
| | "Ma chi te lo fa fare" | Marinella | —N/a | |
| | "Maledetta primavera" | Loretta Goggi | 700 | 2 |
| | "Midnight" | Passengers | —N/a | |
| | "Non posso perderti" | Bobby Solo | —N/a | |
| | "Pensa per te" | Marcella | —N/a | |
| | "Per Elisa" | Alice | 736 | 1 |
| | "Questo amore non si tocca" | Gianni Bella | —N/a | |
| | "Roma spogliata" | Luca Barbarossa | —N/a | |
| | "Sarà perché ti amo" | Ricchi e Poveri | —N/a | |
| | "Su quel pianeta libero" | Michele Zarrillo | —N/a | |
| | "Tu cosa fai stasera?" | Dario Baldan Bembo | 572 | 3 |
| | "Tutto è blu" | Sterling St. Jacques | —N/a | |

== Other awards ==
=== Supergiuria ===
A unique feature of the edition was the Supergiuria, which was a jury of celebrities that conducted a non-competitive vote amongst the competing songs in the final. It consisted of five Italian celebrities from the film industry, four of which were actors invited as a way to cross-promote recently released films they were apart of. The jury included the filmmaker Sergio Leone, who served as jury president, Eleonora Giorgi promoting the film Mia moglie è una strega, Giancarlo Giannini promoting the film Lili Marleen, Ugo Tognazzi promoting the film La tragedia di un uomo ridicolo and Alberto Sordi promoting the film Io e Caterina. The jury's winner was "Ancora" performed by Eduardo De Crescenzo, while the festival's winner, "Per Elisa" performed by Alice, was placed third.

Supergiuria ranking
| Song | Artist | Place |
|---|---|---|
| "Ancora" | Eduardo De Crescenzo | 1 |
| "La barca non va più" | Orietta Berti | 2 |
| "Per Elisa" | Alice | 3 |

== Broadcasts ==
=== Local broadcast ===
During a meeting with the festival's organisers in November 1980, RAI agreed to broadcast all three nights of the festival on television in their entirety for the first time since 1972. This followed several editions where they broadcast the first two nights exclusively on radio as part of an initiative to limit their pop music programming that began in 1973. The mayor of Sanremo, Osvaldo Vento, stated that he believed RAI made the decision due to the success of the previous edition and the lack of equally popular Italian music events.

All three shows were broadcast on television via Rete Uno and on radio via Rai Radio 2. The first night was broadcast on television beginning at 21:45 CET and on radio beginning at 21:40 CET, while the second night was broadcast at 21:30 CET and the final night was broadcast at 20:40 CET. The final was broadcast on television to an estimated 22.7 million viewers in Italy.

=== International broadcasts ===
The final was broadcast abroad via the Eurovision network. Known details on the broadcasts in each country, including the specific broadcasting stations and commentators are shown in the tables below.

International broadcasters of the Sanremo Music Festival 1981
| Country | Broadcaster | Channel(s) | Commentator(s) | Ref(s) |
|---|---|---|---|---|
| Costa Rica | Canal 13 (Note: Delayed broadcast on 26 December at 21:00 (CST)) | | | |

== Incidents and controversies ==
=== Dispute over Marina Occhiena's participation ===
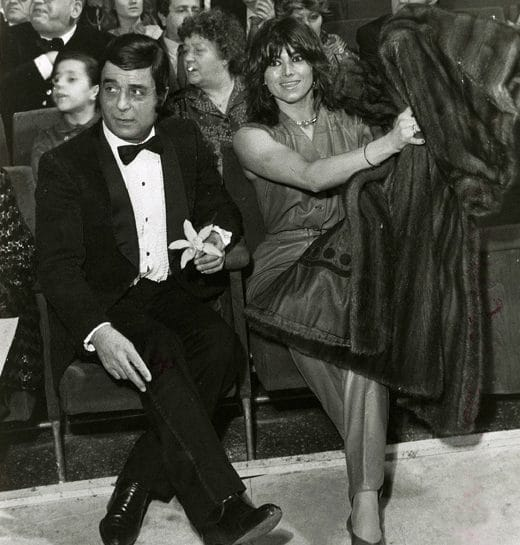
Former member of Ricchi e Poveri, Marina Occhiena (right), in the festival's audience

Prior to the announcement of Ricchi e Poveri's participation in the festival and the recording of their competing song "Sarà perché ti amo", one of their members, Marina Occhiena, unofficially departed from the group. Rumours reported by press suggest she decided to leave the group after disagreements with fellow member Angela Brambati.

On the day of the festival's second night, Occhiena and her lawyer announced their intention to request an emergency court order to prevent the group from performing the song without Occhiena during the event. She claimed that the group could not legally perform without her under the name "Ricchi e Poveri" and that they had taken advantage of the illness that caused her absence to record the song without her. The following morning, on the day of the final, a magistrate in Sanremo ordered Occhiena to perform the song as part of the group during a rehearsal to determine if she could be reinstated for their performance in the show. Following the rehearsal, the magistrate determined that nothing prevented her from performing with the group and mandated her inclusion in their performance. However, later in the day, she chose to decline the opportunity after financial negotiations with the group's record producer that concluded shortly before the show began.
