= Sanremo Music Festival 1993 =

Italian song contest (43rd edition)

Dates and venue
- Semi-final 1: 23 February 1993
- Semi-final 2: 24 February 1993
- Semi-final 3: 25 February 1993
- Semi-final 4: 26 February 1993
- Final: 27 February 1993
- Venue: Teatro Ariston; Sanremo, Italy

Organisation
- Broadcaster: Radiotelevisione italiana (RAI)
- Artistic director: Adriano Aragozzini, Carlo Bixio, Marco Ravera
- Presenters: Pippo Baudo and Lorella Cuccarini

Big Artists section
- Number of entries: 24
- Winner: "Mistero"; Enrico Ruggeri

Newcomers' section
- Number of entries: 18
- Winner: "La solitudine" Laura Pausini

The Sanremo Music Festival 1993 (Italian: Festival di Sanremo 1993), officially the 43rd Italian Song Festival (43º Festival della canzone italiana), was the 43rd annual Sanremo Music Festival, held at the Teatro Ariston in Sanremo between 23 and 27 February 1993 and broadcast by Radiotelevisione italiana (RAI). The show was presented by Pippo Baudo and Lorella Cuccarini.

The winner of the Big Artists section was Enrico Ruggeri with the rock-pop song "Mistero", while Cristiano De André ranked second and won the Critics Award with the ballad "Dietro la porta". Laura Pausini won the Newcomers section with the song "La solitudine".

After every night Rai 1 broadcast DopoFestival, a talk show about the Festival with the participation of singers and journalists. It was hosted by Alba Parietti and Pippo Baudo with Giancarlo Magalli, Marta Marzotto and Roberto D'Agostino. The theme song of the talk show was "Papà" by Mino Reitano and Gianni Ippoliti.

== Participants and results ==
=== Big Artists ===
Big Artists section
Song	Artist(s)	Songwriter(s)	Rank
"Mistero"	Enrico Ruggeri	Enrico Ruggeri	1
"Dietro la porta"	Cristiano De André	Daniele Fossati; Cristiano De André	2 / Mia Martini Critics Award
"Gli amori diversi"	Rossana Casale & Grazia Di Michele	Rossana Casale; Giorgio Restelli; Grazia Di Michele	3
"Dedicato a te"	Matia Bazar	Laura Valente; Maurizio Bassi; Sergio Cossu; Aldo Stellita	4
"Ave Maria"	Renato Zero	Renato Fiacchini; Renato Serio	5
"Figli di chi"	Mietta & I Ragazzi di Via Meda	Daniela Miglietta; Antonello de Sanctis; Giuseppe Isgrò; Filippo Neviani	6
"Stato di calma apparente"	Paola Turci	Paola Turci; Gaio Chiocchio	7
"Non so più a chi credere"	Biagio Antonacci	Biagio Antonacci	8
"Notte bella, magnifica"	Amedeo Minghi	Amedeo Minghi	9
"Un anno di noi"	Francesca Alotta	Giancarlo Bigazzi; Marco Falagiani; Giuseppe Dati	10
"Sogno"	Andrea Mingardi	Andrea Mingardi	11
"L'Italia è bella"	Roberto Murolo	Carlo Faiello	12
"Qui gatta ci cova"	Tullio De Piscopo	Mario & Giosy Capuano; Tullio De Piscopo	13
"Stiamo come stiamo"	Loredana Bertè & Mia Martini	Maurizio Piccoli; Loredana Bertè	14
"Una canzone d'amore"	Nino Buonocore	Michele De Vitis; Nino Buonocore	15
"Balla italiano"	Jo Squillo	Jo Squillo	Eliminated
"Cambiamo musica"	Ladri di Biciclette ft. Tony Esposito	Tony Esposito; Enrico Prandi; Giorgio Verdelli; Gianluigi Di Franco	Eliminated
"Come passa il tempo"	Maurizio Vandelli, Dik Dik & I Camaleonti	Giancarlo Bigazzi; Riccardo Del Turco; Giuseppe Dati	Eliminated
"Dammi 1 bacio"	Francesco Salvi	Francesco Salvi; Mario Natale; Roberto Turatti	Eliminated
"L'alba"	Peppino Gagliardi	Sergio Cirillo; Peppino Gagliardi	Eliminated
"La voce delle stelle"	Peppino di Capri	Giuseppe Faiella; Mimmo Di Francia; Fabrizio Berlincioni	Eliminated
"Sulla strada del mare"	Schola Cantorum	Antonello de Sanctis; Alberto Cheli	Eliminated
"Tu tu tu tu"	Alessandro Canino	Giancarlo Bigazzi; Paolo Hollesch; Alessandro Baldinotti; Giuseppe Dati	Eliminated
"Uomini addosso"	Milva	Roby Facchinetti; Valerio Negrini	Eliminated

=== Newcomers ===
Newcomers section
Song	Artist(s)	Songwriter(s)	Rank
"La solitudine"	Laura Pausini	Pietro Cremonesi; Angelo Valsiglio; Federico Cavalli	1
"Ma non ho più la mia città"	Gerardina Trovato	Gerardina Trovato; Donatella Milani; Mauro Malavasi	2
"In te"	Nek	Filippo Neviani; Antonello de Sanctis; Giuseppe Isgrò	3
"Guardia o ladro"	Bracco Di Graci	Bracco Di Graci	4
"L'amore vero"	Erminio Sinni	Erminio Sinni; Riccardo Cocciante	5
"Non volevo"	Rosario Di Bella	Rosario Di Bella	6
"Non è tardi"	Marco Conidi	Marco Conidi; Massimo Mastrangeli	7
"Non ci prenderanno mai"	Fandango	Lidia Fiori; Roberto Lanzo	8
"Quello che non siamo"	Tony Blescia	Tony Blescia	9
"A piedi nudi"	Angela Baraldi	Angela Baraldi; Marco Bertoni; Enrico Serotti	Eliminated / Mia Martini Critics Award
"Caramella"	Leo Leandro	Salvatore Jovine; Leopoldo D'Angelo	Eliminated
"Ci vuole molto coraggio"	Luca Manca, Luca Virago, Emanuela & Gabriele Fersini	Alberto Salerno; Maurizio Fabrizio	Eliminated
"Femmene"	Niné	Giulia Guido; Matteo Bonsanto; Stefano Pulga, Maurizio Preti	Eliminated
"Femmina"	Marcello Pieri	Marcello Pieri	Eliminated
"Finché vivrò"	Lorenzo Zecchino	Lorenzo Zecchino	Eliminated
"Il mare delle nuvole"	Antonella Bucci	Eros Ramazzotti; Adelio Cogliati	Eliminated
"Non dire mai"	Cliò	Elio Palumbo; Vania Magelli	Eliminated
"Tu con la mia amica"	Maria Grazia Impero	Enrico Riccardi	Eliminated
