= Gelato al cioccolato =

Studio album by Pupo
- Released: July 1979
- Recorded: 1977; 1978; March – April 1979
- Studio: Country Lane, Munich; Stone Castle, Carimate
- Genre: Dance-pop
- Length: 31:02
- Label: Baby

Pupo chronology
Come sei bella (1976)	Gelato al cioccolato (1979)	Più di prima (1980)

Singles from Gelato al cioccolato
- 1. "Io solo senza te" Released: 1977; 2. "Sempre tu" Released: 1977; 3. "Ciao" Released: 1978; 4. "Forse" Released: 1979

Gelato al cioccolato is the second studio album by Italian singer Pupo, released in 1979 through Baby Records.

== Background ==
It includes the singles "Forse" and "Gelato al cioccolato". Regarding the title track, a light and carefree song, years later Ghinazzi revealed that it was actually inspired by a passionate adventure that the lyricist, Cristiano Malgioglio, had in North Africa with a local boy. However, Malgioglio later denied this version. Malgioglio, already known as a songwriter for artists like Mina and Ornella Vanoni, did not want to publicly appear as the author for Pupo, so he had himself credited under the pseudonym "Miozzi".

== Track listing ==
Gelato al cioccolato track listing
No.	Title	Writer(s)	Length
1.	"Forse"	Pace; Barbarani	3:05
2.	"Atomino"	Vanni; Tinti; Barbarani	3:17
3.	"Gabriella"	Pace	2:20
4.	"Io solo senza te"	La Bionda	3:08
5.	"Ti ricordi"	Balducci	3:00
6.	"Gelato al cioccolato"	Malgioglio	3:32
7.	"Cercami ancora"	Tinti; Cavallina	2:50
8.	"Sempre tu"	Barbarani	3:02
9.	"A volte"	Thatcher; Minniti; Tinti	3:08
10.	"Ciao"	Pace; Tinti	3:40
Total length:			31:02

== Personnel ==
- Pupo – vocals
- Todd Canedy – drums, electronic drums
- Michael Tatcher – keyboard
- Stephan Diaz – guitar
- Joseph Spector – percussion
- Kelly Bryan – bass
- Dave Inker – mandolin
- James Polivka – trumpet
- Scot Newton – trumpet
- Hermann Breuer – trombone
- Giuseppe Solera – saxophone, flute
- Lance Burton – saxophone, flute
- Gabriele Balducci, Mario Balducci, Marco Ferradini, Silver Pozzoli – backing vocals

Production

- Uli Ullmann – mixing
- Harry Thumann – mixing
- Ruggero Penazzo – mixing

== Charts ==
Chart performance for Gelato al cioccolato
Chart (1979–1980)	Peak position
Italian Albums (Musica e dischi)	22
