= Umui Kaji =

Studio album by Rimi Natsukawa
- Released: March 9, 2007
- Recorded: 2006–2007
- Genre: J-pop, Shima uta, traditional
- Length: 44:57
- Label: Victor Entertainment

Rimi Natsukawa chronology
Rimi Natsukawa Selection (2006)	Umui Kaji (2007)	Uta Sagashi: Request Cover Album (2007)

Singles from Umui Kaji
- 1. "Sayōnara Arigatō (Ama no Kaze)/Mirai" Released: August 23, 2006; 2. "Furusato" Released: February 7, 2007

Umui Kaji (想い風, Okinawan: Thought Wind) is Rimi Natsukawa's fifth original album, released on March 9, 2007. According to Natsukawa, title was chosen for the album as it gave an image of "so many thoughts put into song. Of course, it's not a strong wind, but a fresh wind I want to reach the listeners."

== Background ==
"Umui Kaji" was released after two singles. "Sayōnara Arigatō (Ama no Kaze)/Mirai" in August 2006 was a re-arrangement of her song "Sayōnara Arigatō" (a single from Ayakaji no Ne) by the song's writer, Kentarō Kobuchi of Kobukuro. The second A-side, "Mirai," did not feature on the album. "Furusato" was written by singer Noriyuki Makihara, and was used as the theme song for the drama Asakusa Fukumaru Ryokan.

== Collaborations ==
Many of the tracks feature collaborations with popular musicians or high-profile composers/lyricists. "Matsuri no Ato Kaze" is a collaboration with Okinawan singer Isamu Shimoji and Begin guitarist Hitoshi Uechi. "Eisa no Yoru" was performed by Okinawan band Parsha Club was the backing band, and was composed by member Masaaki Uechi.

The bonus track is a collaboration with Andrea Bocelli that featured on the Japanese release of his album Amore (also as a bonus track there).

== Track listing ==
No.	Title	Writer(s)	Arranger(s)	Length
1.	"Furusato (フルサト, Hometown)"	Noriyuki Makihara	Makihara	4:28
2.	"Sanctuary (サンクチュアリ, Sankuchuari)"	Yūko Ebine, Hideo Saitō	Seiichi Kyōda	4:54
3.	"Toki no Kawa (時の河, River of Time)"	Chokkyū Murano, Takuya Harada	Kyōda	5:35
4.	"Anata to Tomo ni (あなたとともに, Together with You)"	Yoshiyasu Ichikawa, Hideo Saitō	Saitō	4:42
5.	"Matsuri no Ato Kaze (祭りのあと風, Wind After the Festival)"	Isamu Shimoji, Hitoshi Uechi	Uechi	5:11
6.	"Eisa no Yoru (エイサーの夜, Eisa Night)"	Maya Nekoda, Masaaki Uechi	Parsha Club	5:05
7.	"Hanagasumi (花霞, Flower Haze)"	Takeshi Senno	Senno	5:52
8.	"Sayōnara Arigatō (Ama no Kaze) (さようなら ありがとう～天の風～, Good-Bye, Thank You (Sky Wind))"	Kentarō Kobuchi	Kobuchi	4:47
9.	"Somos Novios (Ai no Yume) (ソモス・ノビオス～愛の夢, It's Impossible (Dream of Love))" (Andrea Bocelli feat. Rimi Natsukawa)	Armando Manzanero	Bill Ross	4:23

== Japan sales rankings ==
Release	Chart	Peak position	First week sales	Sales total
Oricon Weekly Albums Chart	76	2,641	6,416	4 weeks
