= Passione (Andrea Bocelli album) =

Studio album by Andrea Bocelli
- Released: 29 January 2013
- Recorded: January–February, Record Plant Studios, Hollywood, CA, Los Angeles, California
- Genre: Pop; traditional pop; vocal; Latin American
- Length: 52:01
- Language: Italian, Spanish, Portuguese, English, French
- Label: Universal, Verve, Decca, Universal Latino, Sugar
- Producer: David Foster

Andrea Bocelli chronology
Opera (2012)	Passione (2013)	Cinema (2015)

Singles from Passione
- 1. "Quizás, Quizás, Quizás" Released: December 3, 2013

Passione is the fourteenth studio album by Italian tenor Andrea Bocelli, released on 29 January 2013. The album is a collection of Mediterranean love songs featuring duets with Jennifer Lopez, Nelly Furtado and a virtual duet with the late French cabaret singer Édith Piaf (who died in 1963). It was produced by multiple Grammy-winning producer and Verve Music Group Chairman David Foster, who co-produced Bocelli's 2006 Latin album Amore. A Spanish version of the album titled Pasión is set to be released through Universal Latino label.

== Background ==
The album features a collection of Mediterranean love songs featuring duets with Jennifer Lopez, Nelly Furtado and the late French cabaret singer Édith Piaf who died in 1963. Bocelli sings in six languages, Italian, English, French, Spanish, Portuguese, and Neapolitan. Instrumentalists include Foster on piano, along with Peruvian guitarist Ramon Stagnaro, trumpeter Chris Botti, and a 63-piece orchestra.

Passione includes Elvis Presley's “Love Me Tender”, “The Girl from Ipanema”, “Sarà Settembre”, a version of Neil Diamond’s “September Morn” with Italian lyrics written by Bocelli and Kenny Loggins and Stevie Nicks'. Bocelli sings “Quizás Quizás Quizás” with Jennifer Lopez and “Corcovado” with Nelly Furtado, and a virtual duet of "La Vie en rose" with the late French cabaret singer Edith Piaf is also included who died in 1963.

== Promotion and release ==
Bocelli released the studio album on January 29 on the Sugar, Decca, and Verve music labels.

Germany

In December 2012, Bocelli performed "When I Fall in Love" and The Prayer with Helene Fischer on her German show, and on RTL's Ultimative Chart Show.

France

On January 9, Bocelli appeared on the magazine C a Vous on France 5, and sang "La Vie en rose". On the 12, he was interviewed on the radio show On Repeint la Musique on France Bleu.

On February 1, Bocelli gave an interview to the radio show Passion Classique on the Radio Classique station.

On February 3, Bocelli took part in an episode of Là où je t'emmènerai on TF1

On February 8, "Laissez-vous tenter" on RTL radio featured a short interview with Bocelli and played selections of Passione.

On March 31, Michel Drucker's Vivement Dimanche featured a performance of Bocelli singing "La vie en rose".

Spain

Bocelli gave an interview about Passione in his home for María Teresa Campos's show "¡Qué tiempo tan feliz!" on Telecinco.

United Kingdom

On January 23, Bocelli performed on ITV's This Morning and was interviewed by Becky Want on her radio show on BBC Radio Manchester.

On January 25, Bocelli and his partner Veronica were both interviewed by Alan Titchmarsh on the Alan Titchmarsh Show.

On February 6, Bocelli was interviewed by Bill Turnbull and Susanna Reid on BBC Breakfast.

United States

On January 27, Bocelli began promoting the album in the States on QVC. He sang ten songs from the album, including "Quizás, Quizás, Quizás" and "Corcovado" with Natalie Cole filling in for Jennifer Lopez and Nelly Furtado. The standard edition of Passione, along with a bonus cd with 6 tracks from Bocelli's 2006 album Amore was offered to QVC viewers.

On January 28, Bocelli performed songs from the album at the iHeart Radio theater presented by P. C. Richard & Son, in 32 Avenue of the Americas, in New York City. The concert was streamed live on the Internet radio platform iHeartRadio.

On January 29, Bocelli performed accompanied on piano by David Foster a solo version of "Quizás, Quizás, Quizás" and "Love Me Tender" on ABC's Good Morning America.

On January 30, Bocelli and Foster performed "Sara' Settembre" on The View following a brief interview with Whoopi Goldberg and Sherri Shepherd.

On February 1, Bocelli performed "Quizás, Quizás, Quizás" on NBC's Late Night with Jimmy Fallon.

On February 12, Bocelli was interviewed about the album, by María Celeste Arrarás, on Telemundo's Al Rojo Vivo.

On April 9, Bocelli sang “Quizás Quizás Quizás” with Jennifer Lopez on Dancing with the Stars.

=== Passione Tour ===
Tour dates

Date	City	Country	Venue
First Leg: Valentine Concert
February 8, 2013	Fort Lauderdale, Florida	United States	BankAtlantic Center

Box office score data

Venue	City	Tickets sold / available	Gross revenue
BankAtlantic Center	Fort Lauderdale, Florida	11,920 / 12,402 (96%)	$1,990,015
Total		11,920 / 12,402 (96%)	$1,990,015

== Critical reception ==
Professional ratings
Review scores
Source	Rating
BBC	Favorable
Daily Express	4/5 stars
The Independent	3/5 stars

The album was well received by critics.

Adrian Edwards, of the BBC, praised Bocelli for "his relaxed manner belying an innate artistry as he moves from the classical style into a popular vein with consummate ease. His delivery is such that we hear his core feeling for each language, which colours his special timbre." He also complemented Foster for "the employment of instrumental colours from saxophone, guitar, flute and accordion across the palette, played by distinguished instrumentalists, adds variety to deft arrangements of some very familiar songs." However, regarding the virtual duet with "Piaf", he said "not even modern studio techniques can disguise the shortcomings of the original recording."

Stephen Unwin, of the Daily Express, gave the album 4/5, stating that Bocelli "proves yet again that his voice is universal and his song choices commercially palatable." He also said that "a more interesting duet is La Vie En Rose with the late French cabaret singer Edith Piaf, (who died in 1963), though production from multi-Grammy winner David Foster ensures a meticulously romantic collection of slushy international classics."

Andy Gill, The Independent's music critic, gave the album 3 out of 5 stars, mainly praising Bocelli's delivery in “Era Gia' Tutto Prevista”, “Perfidia” and “Roma Nun Fa' La Stupida Stasera”.

== Commercial performance ==
Passione entered the UK album charts at No.9, making it his eighth album to reach the top ten in the country. The following week, the album jumped two spots to No.7.

Passione become Bocelli's seventh top 10 set on the Billboard 200 chart, by debuting at No. 2 with 94,000 copies sold. Thus the set ties Bocelli's earlier runner-up title, 2009's My Christmas, which spent five consecutive weeks stuck at No. 2, as his highest charting Billboard 200 album to date. Passione was however the top selling physical album in the States, seeing as only 10% of its total sales were from Digital downloads. The following week, with three new entries to the chart, the album dropped three spots to No. 5 with 51,000 copies sold, making it the No. 2 holdover of the week. The album remained in the top 10, at No. 9, on its third week, with 48,000 copies sold, down just 6%, perhaps owing to gift purchases made for Valentine's Day.

Pasion, the Spanish version of the album, also debuted at No. 59 on the Billboard 200, with 7,000 sold. The album also topped the Latin Albums chart, Bocelli's second No. 1, following 2009's Mi Navidad, the Spanish version of My Christmas.

== Track listings ==
Passione standard edition
No.	Title	Writer(s)	Producer(s)	Length
1.	"Perfidia"	Alberto Domínguez	David Foster	4:08
2.	"Roma Nun Fa' La Stupida Stasera"	Armando Trovaioli	Foster	4:14
3.	"Champagne"	Depsa, Jodice, Di Francia	Foster	3:49
4.	"Anema e core"	Salvatore d'Esposito	Foster	4:10
5.	"Quizás, Quizás, Quizás" (Jennifer Lopez)	Osvaldo Farrés	Foster	3:18
6.	"Era già tutto previsto"	Riccardo Cocciante	Foster	3:43
7.	"Tristeza"	Haroldo Lobo, Niltinho Tristeza	Foster	3:24
8.	"La Vie en rose" (Virtual duet with Édith Piaf)	Louis Guglielmi, Édith Piaf	Foster	3:08
9.	"Corcovado - Quiet Nights Of Quiet Stars" (Nelly Furtado)	Antônio Carlos Jobim	Foster	3:36
10.	"Sara' Settembre (September Morn)"	Gilbert Bécaud, Andrea Bocelli, Neil Diamond	Foster	3:42
11.	"Love In Portofino"	Ferdinando "Fred" Buscaglione	Foster	3:01
12.	"Garota De Ipanema"	Antônio Carlos Jobim, Vinicius de Moraes	Foster	3:38
13.	"Malafemmena"	Totò	Foster	4:18
14.	"Love Me Tender"	Elvis Presley, George R. Poulton, Ken Darby	Foster	3:52

Passione deluxe edition bonus tracks
No.	Title	Writer(s)	Producer(s)	Length
1.	"Il Nostro Incontro" (Chris Botti)	Andrea Morricone	Foster	4:33
2.	"Senza fine"	Gino Paoli	Foster	3:18
3.	"A mano a mano"	Riccardo Cocciante	Foster	4:19
4.	"When I Fall in Love" (Botti, Helene Fischer)	Victor Young, Edward Heyman	Foster	4:41

Passione super deluxe edition bonus disc
No.	Title	Writer(s)	Producer(s)	Length
1.	"Smile"	Charlie Chaplin, John Turner, Geoffrey Parsons	Foster
2.	"A mano a mano"	Cocciante	Foster	4:19
4.	"Senza fine"	Paoli	Foster	3:18
5.	"Il Nostro Incontro" (Botti)	Morricone	Foster	4:33
6.	"Extraños en la Noche"		Foster
7.	"When I Fall in Love" (Botti, Fischer)	Young, Heyman	Foster	4:41
8.	"Champan"		Foster
9.	"El Primer Beso"		Foster
10.	"Era Ya Todo Previsto"		Foster	3:43
11.	"Chica De Ipanema"		Foster	3:38
12.	"Septiembre Amor"		Foster	3:42

Pasión (Spanish version) standard listing
No.	Title	Writer(s)	Producer(s)	Length
1.	"Perfidia"	Domínguez	Foster	4:08
2.	"Roma Nun Fa' La Stupida Stasera"	Trovaioli	Foster	4:14
3.	"Champagne"	Versi: Depsa - Jodice Musica: Mimmo Di Francia	Foster	3:49
4.	"Anema e core"	d'Esposito	Foster	4:10
5.	"Quizás, Quizás, Quizás" (Lopez)	Farrés	Foster	3:18
6.	"Era Ya Todo Previsto"	Cocciante	Foster	3:43
7.	"Tristeza"		Foster	3:24
8.	"La Vie en rose" (Piaf)	Guglielmi, Piaf	Foster	3:08
9.	"Contingo en la Distancia"		Foster
10.	"Corcovado" (Furtado)		Foster	3:36
11.	"Septiembre Amor"		Foster	3:42
12.	"El Primer Beso"		Foster
13.	"Chica De Ipanema"	de Moraes	Foster	3:38
14.	"Malafemmena"	Totò	Foster	4:18
15.	"Love Me Tender"	Presley	Foster	3:52

== Love In Portofino ==
Andrea Bocelli: Love In Portofino was released in cinemas on February 14, 2013.

The movie is of a Bocelli concert in Portofino, Italy, recorded in August 2012, where he performed songs from Passione, with an ensemble of supporting artists, including violinist Caroline Campbell, German star Helene Fischer, Brazilian singer-songwriter Sandy, trumpeter Chris Botti, and Bocelli's partner Veronica Berti joining him for a duet of "Somethin' Stupid", all backed by a 40 piece orchestra.

The world premiere of the release, with Andrea Bocelli in attendance, took place in London on January 21, 2013.

On March 3, 2013, the film aired continuously on PBS stations nationwide as part of Great Performances.

=== Credits ===
- Director: David Horn
- Executive Producers: Filippo Sugar and David Horn
- Executive Producer for Additional Footage: Alfred Chubb
- Producers: Andrea Cotromano and Mitch Owgang
- Music Production: David Foster

=== Featured songs ===
- Cinema Paradiso (featuring Chris Botti)
- Senza fine
- Anema e core (featuring Caroline Campbell)
- Quizás, quizás, quizás (featuring Jennifer Lopez)
- A mano a mano
- Perfidia
- Champagne
- Corcovado (featuring Sandy)
- Tristeza
- La vie en rose
- Something Stupid (featuring Veronica Berti)
- Besame mucho
- Love Me Tender
- September Morn
- When I Fall in Love (featuring Helene Fischer, Chris Botti)
- Roma nun fa' la stupida stasera
- Era già tutto previsto
- Love in Portofino (featuring Caroline Campbell)
- My Way

== Charts and certifications ==
=== Weekly charts ===
Chart (2013–14)	Peak position
Australian Albums (ARIA)	33
Austrian Albums (Ö3 Austria)	11
Belgian Albums (Ultratop Flanders)	12
Belgian Albums (Ultratop Wallonia)	29
Canadian Albums Chart	4
Czech Albums (ČNS IFPI)	4
Danish Albums (Hitlisten)	11
Dutch Albums (Album Top 100)	5
Estonian Albums Chart	1
Finnish Albums (Suomen virallinen lista)	13
French Albums (SNEP)	33
German Albums (Offizielle Top 100)	40
Greek Albums (IFPI Greece)	18
Hungarian Albums (MAHASZ)	2
Irish Albums (IRMA)	3
Italian Albums (FIMI)	3
Mexican Albums (Top 100 Mexico)	8
New Zealand Albums (RMNZ)	8
Norwegian Albums (VG-lista)	2
Polish Albums (ZPAV)	1
Portuguese Albums (AFP)	9
Scottish Albums (OCC)	8
South African Albums (RISA)	4
Spanish Albums (PROMUSICAE)	9
Swedish Albums (Sverigetopplistan)	3
Swiss Albums (Schweizer Hitparade)	34
Taiwanese Albums (Five Music International Album Chart)	12
UK Albums (OCC)	7
US Billboard 200	2
US Classical Albums	1
US Digital Albums Chart	15

=== Year-end charts ===
Chart (2013)	Position
Belgian Albums (Ultratop Flanders)	155
Dutch Albums (Album Top 100)	85
US Billboard 200	71
US Classical Albums (Billboard)	2
US Top Latin Albums (Billboard)	1
US Latin Pop Albums	1

== Certifications ==
Region	Certification	Certified units/sales
Canada (Music Canada)	Gold	40,000^{^}
Colombia (ASINCOL)	Gold	
Hungary (MAHASZ)	Gold	1,000^{^}
Italy (FIMI)	Gold	30,000^{*}
Poland (ZPAV)	Platinum	20,000^{‡}
Portugal (AFP)	Gold	7,500^{^}
United States (RIAA)	Gold	500,000^{^}
^{*} Sales figures based on certification alone.^{^} Shipments figures based on certification alone.^{‡} Sales+streaming figures based on certification alone.
