= Chiarello =

Chiarello is a surname. Notable people with the surname include:

- Francesco Domenico Chiarello (1898–2008), Italian WWI and WWII veteran
- Jo Chiarello (born 1963), Italian singer
- Mark Chiarello, American painter, art director and editor
- Michael Chiarello (1962–2023), American celebrity chef
