= Cinema (Andrea Bocelli album) =

Studio album by Andrea Bocelli
- Released: 23 October 2015
- Genres: Traditional pop; vocal
- Languages: English; French; Italian; Spanish
- Labels: Sugar, Universal, Decca (UK), Verve (US)
- Producers: David Foster, Humberto Gatica, Tony Renis

Andrea Bocelli chronology
Passione (2013)	Cinema (2015)	Romanza (20th Anniversary Edition) (2016)

Singles from Cinema
- 1. "E più ti penso" Released: 1 October 2015

Cinema is the fifteenth studio album by Italian classical tenor recording artist Andrea Bocelli. The album, featuring renditions of classic film soundtracks and scores, was released on 23 October 2015 through Sugar Music and Universal Music Group. A Spanish-language version of the album was also released and has been nominated Album of the Year at the 17th Annual Latin Grammy Awards. Cinema received a nomination for Best Traditional Pop Vocal Album at the 59th Annual Grammy Awards held in February 2017.

== Background ==
The album was produced by David Foster, Humberto Gatica, and Tony Renis who also worked together on Bocelli's Amore in 2006.

Bocelli said of Cinema: "With the album Cinema, I'm fulfilling a wish that I've harboured for decades. I've never made a secret of my dream of bringing to life a recording project associated with soundtracks, as I truly believe that it's an exceptional artistic treasure trove."

== Commercial performance ==
Cinema entered the Official UK Albums Chart at No. 3, behind 5 Seconds of Summer's Sounds Good Feels Good and Bryan Adams's Get Up!. The tally was Bocelli's highest UK chart position in over a decade, since 2001's Cieli di Toscana, and his tenth Top 10 album on the UK album chart, a record for a classical music artist.

The album also debuted at No. 10 on the Billboard 200, with 30,000 units sold, marking his eighth Top 10 effort. In addition, the album topped the Classical Crossover Albums chart, making Cinema Bocelli's 11th No. 1, and extending his record for the most chart-topping albums among all artists on that chart.

== PBS special ==
Cinema was also made into a PBS special, filmed on 18 September 2015 at the Dolby Theatre in Los Angeles.

The program began airing on THIRTEEN's Great Performances series on 27 November 2015 on PBS stations nationwide, featuring Bocelli and Foster with additional guests including Nicole Scherzinger, as well as film stars John Travolta, Ali MacGraw, Ryan O'Neal and Andy García. The Blu-ray was released on 29 April 2016.

== Singles ==
"E più ti penso", a song written by Italian composer Ennio Morricone from the film Once Upon a Time in America, was re-recorded as a duet between Bocelli and American singer Ariana Grande. The song debuted at No. 1 on the Billboard Classical Digital Songs chart. A music video for the song was released on 13 October 2015.

== Track listing ==
Standard version
No.	Title	Lyrics	Music	Length
1.	"Maria" (from West Side Story)	Leonard Bernstein, Stephen Sondheim	Bernstein	3:13
2.	"La chanson de Lara" (from Doctor Zhivago)	Paul Francis Webster, Ithier Hubert	Maurice Jarre	3:15
3.	"Moon River" (from Breakfast at Tiffany's)	Johnny Mercer	Henry Mancini	3:49
4.	"E più ti penso" (duet with Ariana Grande) (from Once Upon a Time in America and Malèna)	Mogol, Tony Renis	Ennio Morricone	4:28
5.	"Be My Love" (from The Toast of New Orleans)	Sammy Cahn	Nicholas Brodszky	2:54
6.	"The Music of the Night" (from The Phantom of the Opera)	Charles Hart, Richard Stilgoe	Andrew Lloyd Webber	3:57
7.	"Por una cabeza" (from Scent of a Woman)	Alfredo Le Pera	Carlos Gardel	3:22
8.	"Sorridi amore vai" (from Life Is Beautiful)	Noa, Gil Dor, Roberto Benigni	Nicola Piovani	3:22
9.	"Mi mancherai" (from Il Postino)	Marco Marinangeli	Luis Bacalov, Riccardo Del Turco, Paolo Margheri	5:06
10.	"Cheek to Cheek" (duet with Veronica Berti) (from Top Hat)	Irving Berlin	Berlin	2:56
11.	"Brucia la Terra" (from The Godfather)	Giuseppe Rinaldi	Giovanni Rota	4:16
12.	"No Llores Por Mi Argentina" (duet with Nicole Scherzinger) (from Evita)	Webber, Tim Rice, J. Carreras, I. Artime Granda, J. Azpilicuieta Perez	Webber, Tim Rice	4:24
13.	"Nelle tue mani (Now We Are Free)" (from Gladiator)	Matteo Curallo	Lisa Gerrard, Klaus Badelt, Hans Zimmer	4:21

Deluxe version
No.	Title	Lyrics	Music	Length
1.	"Maria" (from West Side Story)	Leonard Bernstein, Stephen Sondheim	Bernstein	3:13
2.	"La chanson de Lara" (from Doctor Zhivago)	Paul Francis Webster, Ithier Hubert	Maurice Jarre	3:15
3.	"Moon River" (from Breakfast at Tiffany's)	Johnny Mercer	Henry Mancini	3:49
4.	"E più ti penso" (duet with Ariana Grande) (from Once Upon a Time in America)	Mogol, Tony Renis	Ennio Morricone	4:28
5.	"Be My Love" (from The Toast of New Orleans)	Sammy Cahn	Nicholas Brodszky	2:54
6.	"The Music of the Night" (from The Phantom of the Opera)	Charles Hart, Richard Stilgoe	Andrew Lloyd Webber	3:57
7.	"Brucia la Terra" (from The Godfather)	Giuseppe Rinaldi	Giovanni Rota	4:16
8.	"Por una cabeza" (from Scent of a Woman)	Alfredo Le Pera	Carlos Gardel	3:22
9.	"No Llores Por Mi Argentina" (duet with Nicole Scherzinger) (from Evita)	Webber, Tim Rice, J. Carreras, I. Artime Granda, J. Azpilicuieta Perez	Webber, Tim Rice	4:24
10.	"L'amore è una cosa meravigliosa" (from Love Is a Many-Splendored Thing)	Paul Francis Webster, Alberto Curci	Sammy Fain	3:24
11.	"Mi mancherai" (from Il Postino)	Marco Marinangeli	Luis Bacalov, Riccardo del Turco, Paolo Margheri	5:06
12.	"Cheek to Cheek" (duet with Veronica Berti) (from Top Hat)	Irving Berlin	Berlin	2:56
13.	"Sorridi amore vai" (from La vita è bella)	Noa, Gil Dor, Roberto Benigni	Nicola Piovani	3:22
14.	"Historia de Amor" (from Love Story)	Francis Lai, Andy Williams	Lai	4:29
15.	"Ol' Man River" (from Show Boat)	Oscar Hammerstein II	Jerome Kern	4:07
16.	"Nelle tue mani (Now We Are Free)" (from Gladiator)	Matteo Curallo	Lisa Gerrard, Klaus Badelt, Hans Zimmer	4:21

Cinema (Edición en Español)
No.	Title	Lyrics	Music	Length
1.	"Maravilloso Amor" (from Love Is a Many-Splendored Thing)	Paul Francis Webster, Alberto Curci	Sammy Fain	3:24
2.	"Lara" (from Doctor Zhivago)	Paul Francis Webster, Ithier Hubert	Maurice Jarre	3:15
3.	"Brucia la Terra" (from The Godfather)	Giuseppe Rinaldi	Giovanni Rota	4:16
4.	"E più ti penso" (duet with Ariana Grande) (from Once Upon a Time in America)	Mogol, Tony Renis	Ennio Morricone	4:28
5.	"Historia de Amor" (from Love Story)	Francis Lai, Andy Williams	Lai	4:29
6.	"Me Faltarás" (from Il Postino)	Marco Marinangeli	Luis Bacalov, Riccardo del Turco, Paolo Margheri	5:06
7.	"La Vida es Bella" (from La vita è bella)	Noa, Gil Dor, Roberto Benigni	Nicola Piovani	3:22
8.	"No Llores Por Mi Argentina" (duet with Nicole Scherzinger) (from Evita)	Webber, Tim Rice, J. Carreras, I. Artime Granda, J. Azpilicuieta Perez	Webber, Tim Rice	4:24
9.	"Maria" (from West Side Story)	Leonard Bernstein, Stephen Sondheim	Bernstein	3:13
10.	"Por una cabeza" (from Scent of a Woman)	Alfredo Le Pera	Carlos Gardel	3:22
11.	"Moon River" (from Breakfast at Tiffany's)	Johnny Mercer	Henry Mancini	3:49
12.	"Nelle tue mani (Now We Are Free)" (from Gladiator)	Matteo Curallo	Lisa Gerrard, Klaus Badelt, Hans Zimmer	4:21

Cinema (Versión Deluxe en Español)
No.	Title	Lyrics	Music	Length
1.	"Maravilloso Amor" (from Love Is a Many-Splendored Thing)	Paul Francis Webster, Alberto Curci	Sammy Fain	3:24
2.	"Lara" (from Doctor Zhivago)	Paul Francis Webster, Ithier Hubert	Maurice Jarre	3:15
3.	"Brucia la Terra" (from The Godfather)	Giuseppe Rinaldi	Giovanni Rota	4:16
4.	"E più ti penso" (duet with Ariana Grande) (from Once Upon a Time in America)	Mogol, Tony Renis	Ennio Morricone	4:28
5.	"Historia de Amor" (from Love Story)	Francis Lai, Andy Williams	Lai	4:29
6.	"Me Faltarás" (from Il Postino)	Marco Marinangeli	Luis Bacalov, Riccardo del Turco, Paolo Margheri	5:06
7.	"La Vida es Bella" (from La vita è bella)	Noa, Gil Dor, Roberto Benigni	Nicola Piovani	3:22
8.	"No Llores Por Mi Argentina" (duet with Paty Cantú) (from Evita)	Webber, Tim Rice, J. Carreras, I. Artime Granda, J. Azpilicuieta Perez	Webber, Tim Rice	4:24
9.	"Maria" (from West Side Story)	Leonard Bernstein, Stephen Sondheim	Bernstein	3:13
10.	"Por una cabeza" (from Scent of a Woman)	Alfredo Le Pera	Carlos Gardel	3:22
11.	"The Music of the Night" (from The Phantom of the Opera)	Charles Hart, Richard Stilgoe	Andrew Lloyd Webber	3:57
12.	"Moon River" (from Breakfast at Tiffany's)	Johnny Mercer	Henry Mancini	3:49
13.	"Be My Love" (from The Toast of New Orleans)	Sammy Cahn	Nicholas Brodszky	2:54
14.	"Nelle tue mani (Now We Are Free)" (from Gladiator)	Matteo Curallo	Lisa Gerrard, Klaus Badelt, Hans Zimmer	4:21
15.	"No Llores Por Mi Argentina" (duet with Nicole Scherzinger) (from Evita)	Webber, Tim Rice, J. Carreras, I. Artime Granda, J. Azpilicuieta Perez	Webber, Tim Rice	4:24

Cinema (Versión Japanese Bonus)
No.	Title	Length
14.	"Don't Cry for Me, Argentina" (duet with Sarah Àlainn) (from Evita)	4:24

Cinema (Versión Taiwanese Bonus)
No.	Title	Length
14.	"Cheek to Cheek" (duet with Karen Mok) (from Top Hat)	2:55

== Charts ==
=== Weekly charts ===
Chart (2015–2016)	Peak position
Australian Albums (ARIA)	7
Austrian Albums (Ö3 Austria)	45
Belgian Albums (Ultratop Flanders)	12
Belgian Albums (Ultratop Wallonia)	39
Canadian Albums (Billboard)	18
Danish Albums (Hitlisten)	13
Dutch Albums (Album Top 100)	17
Finnish Albums (Suomen virallinen lista)	45
French Albums (SNEP)	146
Hungarian Albums (MAHASZ)	9
Irish Albums (IRMA)	3
Italian Albums (FIMI)	4
New Zealand Albums (RMNZ)	6
Norwegian Albums (VG-lista)	30
Polish Albums (ZPAV)	2
Portuguese Albums (AFP)	9
Scottish Albums (Official Charts)	4
Spanish Albums (Promusicae)	21
Swiss Albums (Schweizer Hitparade)	33
Taiwanese Albums (Five Music)	1
UK Albums (Official Charts)	3
US Billboard 200	10
US Top Classical Albums (Billboard)	1
US Top Latin Albums (Billboard) Edicion en Español	5

=== Year-end charts ===
Chart (2015)	Position
Belgian Albums (Ultratop Flanders)	146
UK Albums (OCC)	41
US Top Classical Albums (Billboard)	6

Chart (2016)	Position
Belgian Albums (Ultratop Flanders)	132
Italian Albums (FIMI)	86
Polish Albums (ZPAV)	48
US Top Classical Albums (Billboard)	2
US Top Latin Albums (Billboard) Edicion en Español	19

Chart (2017)	Position
US Top Classical Albums (Billboard)	11

Chart (2021)	Position
Polish Albums (ZPAV)	47

== Certifications and sales ==
Region	Certification	Certified units/sales
Canada (Music Canada)	Gold	40,000^{^}
Hungary (MAHASZ)	Platinum	2,000^{^}
Italy (FIMI)	Platinum	50,000^{*}
Poland (ZPAV)	3× Platinum	60,000^{‡}
United Kingdom (BPI)	Gold	177,609
Summaries
Worldwide	—	700,000
^{*} Sales figures based on certification alone.^{^} Shipments figures based on certification alone.^{‡} Sales+streaming figures based on certification alone.
