= E più ti penso =

Song written in 1984 by Ennio Morricone, Mogol, and Tony Renis

Song by Il Volo

from the album Il Volo
- Language: Italian
- English title: The more I think of you
- Written: 1984
- Released: 30 November 2010
- Genre: Pop; pop-opera
- Length: 4:47
- Label: Geffen
- Songwriters: Ennio Morricone; Mogol; Tony Renis
- Producers: Humberto Gatica, Tony Renis

"E più ti penso"

Single by Andrea Bocelli and Ariana Grande

from the album Cinema
- Language: Italian
- Released: 1 October 2015
- Genre: Classical
- Length: 4:28
- Label: Sugar; Universal; Decca (UK); Verve (US)
- Songwriters: Ennio Morricone; Mogol; Tony Renis
- Producers: David Foster; Humberto Gatica; Tony Renis

Andrea Bocelli singles chronology
"Quizás, Quizás, Quizás" (2013)	"E più ti penso" (2015)	"Perfect Symphony" (2017)

Ariana Grande singles chronology
"Adore" (2015)	"E più ti penso" (2015)	"Focus" (2015)

Music video
- "E più ti penso" on YouTube

"E più ti penso" (English: "The more I think of you"), alternatively titled "E più ti penso (from Once Upon a Time in America)", is an Italian song originally written by Ennio Morricone, Mogol, and Tony Renis for the movie Once Upon a Time in America. The song was recorded by the Italian operatic-pop trio Il Volo in 2010 in their first album Il Volo. It was also recorded by Italian singer Andrea Bocelli and American singer-songwriter Ariana Grande. The song was released on 1 October 2015, and served as the lead single from Bocelli's album, Cinema.

== Music video ==
The video, featuring Bocelli and Grande, was released on 13 October 2015, on Bocelli's official Vevo channel.

== Track listing ==
- Digital download
1. "E più ti penso" (From Once Upon a Time in America) – 4:27

== Chart performance ==
The song debuted at number one on the Billboard Classical Digital Songs chart, consequently becoming Grande's first appearance on the chart as well.

Chart (2015)	Peak position
US Classical Digital Songs (Billboard)	1

== Release history ==
Region	Date	Format	Label	Ref.
Various	1 October 2015	Digital download	Sugar	
