= Aldo Donati (singer) =

Italian singer

- Born: 2 September 1947; Rome, Italy
- Died: 24 August 2014 (aged 66); Rome, Italy
- Occupations: Singer, composer and television personality

Aldo Donati (2 September 1947 – 24 August 2014) was an Italian singer, composer and television personality.

Born in Rome, he started his career at very young age as a member of the blues-rock group "Gli Arciduchi". In 1974 he was one of the co-founder and a stable member of the vocal group Schola Cantorum, that had a consistent success for the whole decade.

As a solo singer, his main hits are the songs "Canterò canterò canterò", which ranked fourth at the 1980 Sanremo Music Festival, and "Cantando", which entered the competition at the 1982 Festivalbar.

Donati was also very active as a composer, signing among others several songs for Mina. Among his compositions, the most successful was "Canzoni stonate", a 1981 hit by Gianni Morandi which was later covered by several artists, including Andrea Bocelli and Stevie Wonder in a Spanish adaptation ("Cançion desafinada") for the album Amore.

A supporter of S.S. Lazio, for which he composed the hymn "So' già du ore", in the 2000s he was active in television sport programs as an opinionist and occasionally a presenter. In 2009 he suffered a cerebral hemorrhage, due to an aneurysm, for which he fell into a coma. Never fully recovered, he died on 24 August 2014, aged 66.
