= Alberto Cheli =

Italian singer-songwriter and composer

- Born: 2 November 1951 (age 74); Florence, Italy
- Occupations: Singer; Songwriter

Alberto Cheli (born 2 November 1951) is an Italian singer-songwriter and composer.

== Life and career ==
Born in Florence into a wealthy family, Cheli studied music from an early age. After graduating from the conservatory, he moved to Milan where he joined several rock groups and eventually co-founded with the guitarist Tony Sydney the band Le Madri. Put under contract by record label RCA Italiana, he became a member of the vocal group Schola Cantorum.

In 1978, Cheli left the band to start a solo career, and the same year he participated to the Festivalbar with the song "Cavalli alati". In 1980, he entered the main competition at the 30th edition of the Sanremo Music Festival. In 1986, he rejoined the newly reformed Schola Cantorum. Cheli also worked as a composer for other artists, notably Dalida, Jo Chiarello and Flavia Fortunato.
