= Opera (Andrea Bocelli album) =

Compilation album by Andrea Bocelli
- Released: 3 November 2012 (UK and Ireland only)
- Genre: Opera
- Label: Sugar, Decca

Andrea Bocelli chronology
iTunes Festival: London 2012 (2012)	Opera (2012)	Passione (2013)

Opera is the first compilation album of opera arias by Italian tenor Andrea Bocelli. The album was released only in the United Kingdom and Ireland on 3 November 2012 through Sugar Music and Decca Records. It peaked at number ten on the UK Albums Chart, becoming the singer's seventh top-ten album, and was certified gold by the British Phonographic Industry.

== Background ==
The album is a compilation of arias from Bocelli's previously recorded classical albums.

== Track listing ==
Standard listing
No.	Title	Writer(s)	Opera	Length
1.	"La donna è mobile"	Giuseppe Verdi	Rigoletto, Act III	2:07
2.	"Vesti la giubba"	Ruggero Leoncavallo	Pagliacci, Act I	3:56
3.	"Amor ti vieta"	Umberto Giordano	Fedora, Act II	1:49
4.	"Ingemisco"	Giuseppe Verdi	Messa da Requiem	4:07
5.	"Addio, fiorito asil"	Giacomo Puccini	Madama Butterfly, Act II	1:51
6.	"Celeste Aida"	Verdi	Aida, Act I	4:04
7.	"Brindisi - Viva, il vino spumeggiante"	Pietro Mascagni	Cavalleria rusticana	2:52
8.	"Mamma, quel vino è generoso"	Mascagni	Cavalleria rusticana	3:58
9.	"Au fond du temple saint" (with Bryn Terfel)	Georges Bizet	Les pêcheurs de perles, Act I	5:53
10.	"Una furtiva lagrima"	Gaetano Donizetti	L'elisir d'amore, Act II	4:13
11.	"Lamento di Federico"	Francesco Cilea	L'arlesiana, Act II	4:39
12.	"O mio rimorso!""	Verdi	La traviata, Act II	2:49
13.	"Che gelida manina"	Puccini	La bohème, Act I	4:19
14.	"O soave fanciulla" (with Barbara Frittoli)	Puccini	La bohème, Act I	4:04
15.	"Di quella pira"	Verdi	Il trovatore, Act III	3:12
16.	"Recondita armonia"	Puccini	Tosca, Act I	2:57
17.	"E lucevan le stelle"	Puccini	Tosca, Act III	2:51
18.	"Pourquoi me réveiller"	Jules Massenet	Werther, Act III	3:06
19.	"Pour mon âme"	Donizetti	La fille du régiment, Act I	2:16
20.	"Come un bel dì di maggio"	Giordano	Andrea Chénier, Act IV	3:18
21.	"Nessun dorma"	Puccini	Turandot, Act III	3:11

== Commercial performance ==
The album debuted at No. 10 on the UK Albums Chart, following Bocelli's performance of "Nessun dorma" on the Strictly Come Dancing results show the day before. With 14,577 copies sold, it became Bocelli's 16th Top 40 album and seventh Top 10 entry since his 1997 breakthrough, Romanza, while lifting his career sales to a 4,964,058 total in the United Kingdom.

=== Weekly charts ===
Chart (2012)	Peak position
Irish Albums (IRMA)	19
Scottish Albums (OCC)	12
UK Albums (OCC)	10

=== Year-end charts ===
Chart (2012)	Position
UK Albums (OCC)	102

== Certifications and sales ==
Region	Certification	Certified units/sales
United Kingdom (BPI)	Gold	100,000^{‡}
^{‡} Sales+streaming figures based on certification alone.
