= Lo devo solo a te (song) =

Single by Pupo

from the album Lo devo solo a te
- B-side: "Lidia a Mosca"
- Released: 1981
- Studio: Sound Emporium (Nashville, Tennessee); Country Lane (Munich, Germany); Arco (Munich, Germany)
- Label: Baby Records
- Songwriter(s): Enzo Ghinazzi

Pupo singles chronology
"Cercami ancora" (1980)	"Lo devo solo a te" (1981)	"Nashville" (1982)

"Lo devo solo a te" (transl. "I owe it all to you") is a 1981 song by Italian singer Pupo.

== Track listing ==
No.	Title	Writer(s)	Length
1.	"Lo devo solo a te"	Ghinazzi	3:01
2.	"Lidia a Mosca"	Ghinazzi	3:28

== Charts ==
Chart (1981–1682)	Peak position
Italy (Musica e dischi)	8
Switzerland (Schweiz Hitparade)	6
