= Su di noi =

1980 song performed by Pupo

Single by Pupo

from the album Più di prima
- B-side: "Lucia"
- Released: 7 February 1980
- Studio: Stone Castle Studio, Carimate; Studios 92, Paris
- Label: Baby Records
- Songwriters: Enzo Ghinazzi; Paolo Barabani; Donatella Milani

Pupo singles chronology
"Forse" (1979)	"Su di noi" (1980)	"Cosa farai" (1980)

"Su di noi" (transl. "Above us") is a 1980 song performed by Italian singer Pupo. It placed third in the 30th edition of the Sanremo Music Festival.

It has been covered in different languages, by artists such as Howard Carpendale, Nino de Angelo Emmanuel and more. This song remains Ghinazzi's most popular.

The song was re-recorded in 1998 for the release of Pupo's album Tornerò.

"Su di noi '98"

Song by Pupo

from the album Tornerò
- Released: 18 May 1998
- Genre: Europop
- Length: 3:46
- Label: BMG
- Songwriters: Enzo Ghinazzi; Paolo Barabani; Donatella Milani

== Track listing ==
No.	Title	Length
1.	"Su di noi"	3:17
2.	"Lucia"	3:04

== Charts ==
Chart (1980)	Peak position
Italy (Musica e dischi)	4
West Germany (Media Control)	38
