= Phil Carmen =

Swiss musician (born 1953)

Phil Carmen (born Herbert Hofmann, 14 February 1953) is a Swiss musician and producer.

== Early career ==
Born in Lucerne, Switzerland, Carmen grew up in Frankfurt am Main, Germany and Lucerne. In Lucerne, he went to the Conservatory, but later studied bookkeeping. In 1975, he decided to turn to music. With bassist Mike Thompson (born Marcel Caluzzi), he founded the duo Carmen & Thompson, playing especially country music. The single "Time Moves On" reached #31 on the Italian charts in 1980, and in 1981 they appeared at the Sanremo Festival performing the song "Follow Me".

== Solo career ==
After seven years of stage experience, Carmen founded the Picar Studios in Stein am Rhein, Switzerland in 1982 and recorded two solo albums which attracted little attention until 1985, when he had a hit with the LP Walkin' the Dog, which reached #3 in the Swiss charts. The single "On My Way In LA" was his greatest success and climbed in the summer of 1985 to #18 in Germany and #9 in Switzerland. "On My Way In LA" was also used in the television series Wild West in 1988. His 1986 album Wise Monkeys hit #1 on the Swiss charts, while the single "Moonshine Still" reached #10. His last successful album as a solo artist was City Walls (1987), which went to #10 in Switzerland. The corresponding promotional tour led to the Live in Montreux album with the same band line up of Brian Auger on organ, Pick Withers and Larry E. Van on drums, Dick Morrissey on sax, Steve Dawson on trumpet, Steve Evens on bass, Alexander Leon on bassoon and Sabine van Baaren, backing vocals.

In 1986 he founded the country band Clover Leaf. His 1993 album Skyline again featured Dick Morrissey and also Richard Tee. In 1996 he released an album of Bob Dylan covers, Bob Dylan's Dream, as well as the album Drive and a greatest hits compilation, Cool & Collected: Best of Phil Carmen and Mike Thompson. His subsequent releases include On My Way to L.A. (1999), Back from L.A. Live (1999), No Sweat (2007), and two greatest hits collections, Millennium Collection (2002) and My Way: Hits & Rarities (2007).

== Discography ==
=== Carmen & Thompson ===
- 1979 Time moves on (album)
- 1981 No chance romance (Album)
- 1994 Greatest Hits
- 1980 "Time Moves On" (Single)
- 1980 "Indian Queens" (Single)
- 1981 "Follow Me" (Single)
- 1987 "The Sun Goes Down" (Single)

=== Phil Carmen (solo) ===
==== Albums ====
- 1982 Phrases, Patterns an' Shades
- 1982 Backfire
- 1985 Walkin' the Dog
- 1986 Wise Monkeys
- 1987 City Walls
- 1987 Live in Montreux
- 1988 Changes
- 1991 Drive
- 1992 The Best of 10 Years 1982–1992, Cool & Collected
- 1993 No Strings Attached
- 1993 Skyline
- 1993 Great Hits (Live)
- 1994 Back From L.A. Live
- 1995 No sweat
- 1996 Bob Dylan's Dream
- 1999 Back from L.A. Live

==== Singles ====
- 1985 "On My Way in LA "(Germany #18, Austria #23, Switzerland #9)
- 1986 "Moonshine Still" (Germany #33, Switzerland #10)
- 1987 "Workaholic Slave" (Maxi Single)
- 1988 "God's Creation"
- 1991 "Borderline Down" (Germany #52)
- 1993 "One Foot in Heaven"
- 1995 "No Sweat"

=== Clover Leaf ===
- 1986 Clover Elixier (Album)
- 1992 Born a Rider (Album)
