= Decibel (band) =

Italian band

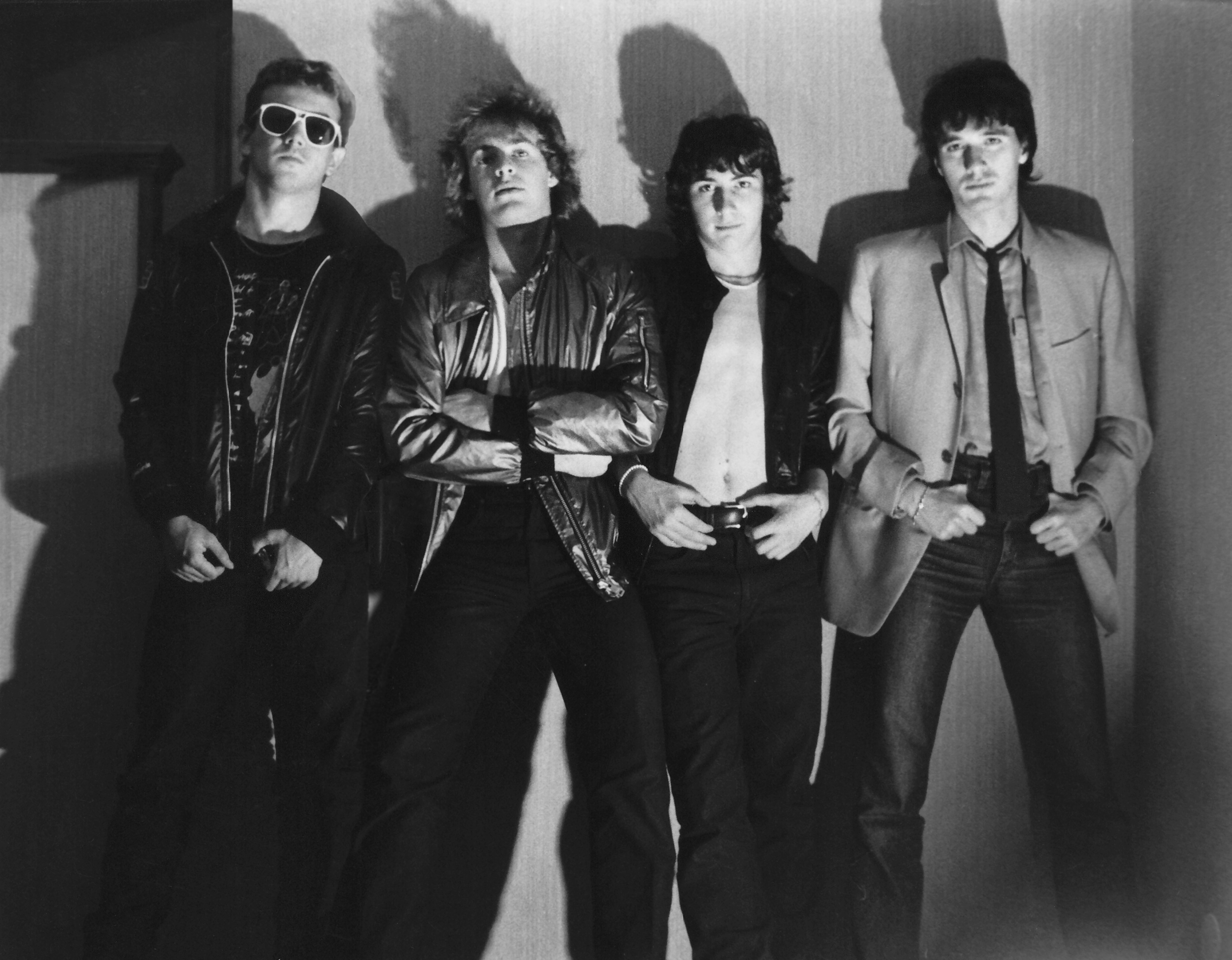
- Decibel in Milan (1979). L-R, Enrico Ruggeri, Fulvio Muzio, Mino Riboni, Silvio Capeccia

Background information
- Origin: Milan, Italy
- Genres: Punk rock New wave Alternative rock
- Years active: 1977–1998; 2016–present
- Members: Enrico Ruggeri; Fulvio Muzio; Silvio Capeccia
- Past members: Mino Riboni; Pino Mancini; Erri Longhin; Roberto Turatti

Decibel is an Italian punk rock band formed in 1977.

They debuted in 1978 with the album Punk and participated at the Sanremo Music Festival 1980 with the song "Contessa". Lead singer Enrico Ruggeri left the band at the end of the year to pursue a successful solo career. Capeccia, Muzio and Riboni continued until the end of the 1990s before disbanding.

The band reformed in 2016 and released their first album of new material in almost twenty years, Noblesse oblige. In 2018 they returned to the Sanremo Music Festival with the song "Lettera dal Duca".

== Members ==
Current

- Enrico Ruggeri – vocals (1977-1980, 2016-present)
- Fulvio Muzio – guitar, keyboards, vocals (1978-1998, 2016-present)
- Silvio Capeccia – keyboards, vocals (1978-1998, 2016-present)

Former members

- Mino Riboni – bass, vocals (1978–1985)
- Pino Mancini – guitar (1977-1978)
- Erri Longhin – bass (1977-1978)
- Roberto Turatti – drums (1977-1978)

== Discography ==
=== Studio albums ===
- Punk (1978)
- Vivo da re (1980)
- Novecento (1982)
- Desaparecida (1998)
- Noblesse oblige (2017)
- L'anticristo (2018)

=== Live albums ===
- Punksnotdead (2019)

== Bibliography ==
- Logan, Nick; Woffinden, Bob (1978). The Illustrated New Musical Express Encyclopedia of Rock. London: Hamlyn.
- Rizzi, Cesare (1993). Enciclopedia del rock italiano. Milan: Arcana. pp. 571–573.
