= Solo noi =

Single by Toto Cutugno

from the album Voglio l'anima (re-issue)
- B-side: "Liberi"
- Released: 7 February 1980
- Label: Carosello
- Songwriter(s): Toto Cutugno
- Producer(s): Cristiano Minellono

Toto Cutugno singles chronology
"Voglio l'anima" (1979)	"Solo noi" (1980)	"Innamorati" (1980)

Audio
- "Solo noi" on YouTube

"Solo noi" (transl. "Only us") is a 1980 song composed and performed by Toto Cutugno. It won the 30th edition of the Sanremo Music Festival.

== Background ==
The song marked Cutugno's solo debut at the Sanremo Music Festival, following two participations with the band Albatros. It was Cutugno's only victory in 13 participations.

In spite of being poorly received by critics, the song was a major international hit, being recorded in several languages including French, Spanish, German, Russian and Flemish. Artists who covered the song include Michèle Torr, Nino de Angelo, Willy Sommers, Peter Orloff, Diana Gurtskaya.

== Track listing ==
- 7" single - CI 20483
1. "Solo noi" (Toto Cutugno) 4:04
2. "Liberi" (Toto Cutugno) 4:03

== Charts ==
Chart (1980–81)	Peak position
Argentina (CAPIF)	1
Italy (Musica e dischi)	2
Switzerland (Schweizer Hitparade)	2
