= Canzoni stonate =

Single by Gianni Morandi
- B-side: "Immaginando"
- Released: 1981
- Genre: Pop
- Length: 4:03
- Label: RCA Italiana
- Songwriter(s): Mogol, Aldo Donati
- Producer(s): Mogol, Shel Shapiro

Gianni Morandi singles chronology
"Mariù" (1980)	"Canzoni stonate" (1981)	"Marinaio" (1982)

Audio
- "Canzoni stonate" on YouTube

"Canzoni stonate" (transl. "Off-key songs") is a 1981 Italian song composed by Mogol (lyrics) and Aldo Donati (music), arranged by Celso Valli and performed by Gianni Morandi.

== Overview ==
After a long period of professional crisis and a poorly received professional comeback at the Sanremo Music Festival 1980 with "Mariù", "Canzoni stonate" proved to be Morandi's true career revival. The song was originally composed by Aldo Donati as "Canzone per chi la vuole" ("Song for those who want it"), with lyrics by veteran songwriter Silvestro Longo. Morandi and his production team found the music effective but considered the lyrics too banal, so Mogol quickly reworked them during a phone call with Donati. The launch of the song proved to be difficult, as RCA Italiana's artistic director initially preferred the B-side of the single "Immaginando".

The song marked the return to hit parade for Morandi, and while it failed to enter the top ten, it became a long-seller and eventually a classic, especially after entering the repertoire of nightclubs and piano bars.

== Track listing ==
No.	Title	Writer(s)	Length
1.	"Canzoni stonate"	Aldo Donati, Mogol	4:03
2.	"Immaginando"	Aldo Azzaro, Mogol, Gianni Morandi	3:52

== Charts ==
=== Weekly charts ===
Chart (1981)	Peak position
Italy (Billboard)	18
Italy (Musica e dischi)	24

== Other versions ==
In 1988, Mina recorded the song for the album Ridi pagliaccio. Andrea Bocelli and Stevie Wonder recorded the song for Bocelli's 2006 album Amore.
