= Enrico Ruggeri =

Italian singer-songwriter

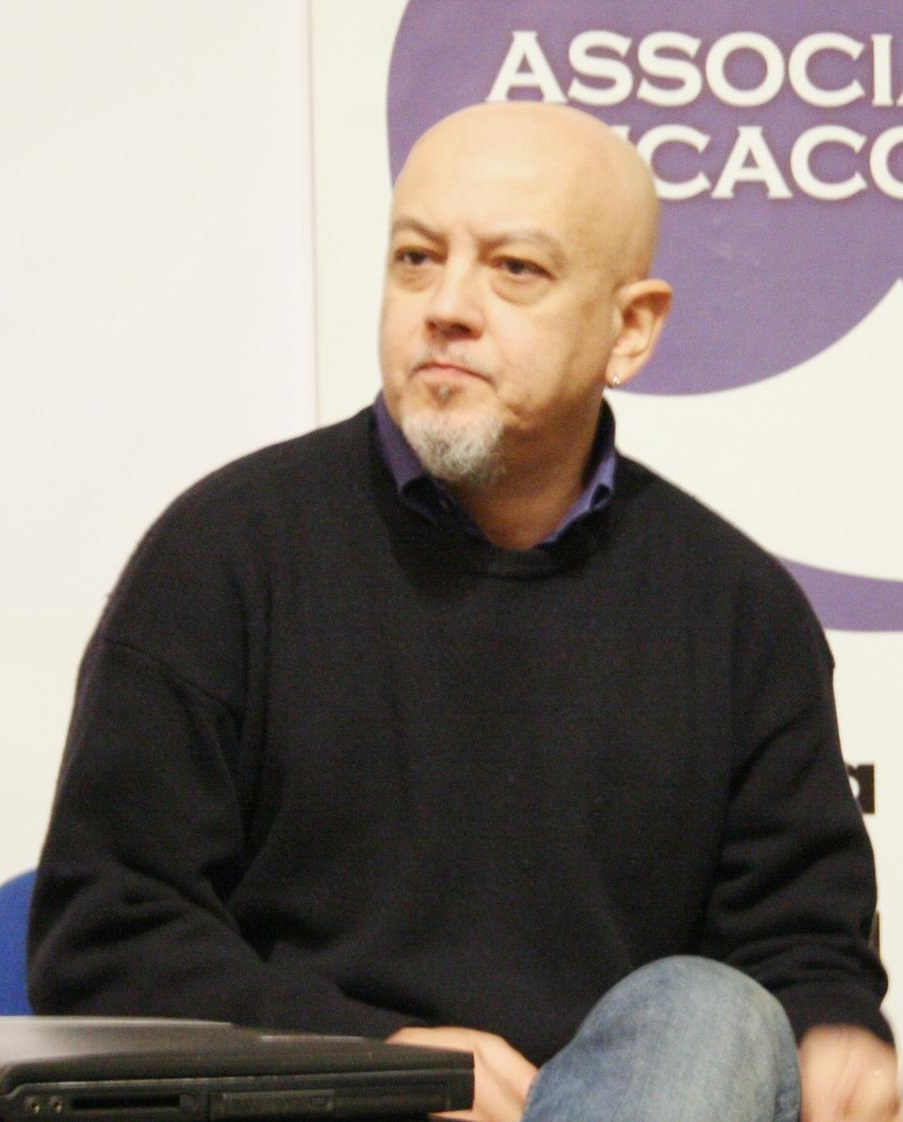
- Enrico Ruggeri in 2006

Background information
- Born: 5 June 1957 (age 69); Milan, Italy
- Genres: Rock
- Occupations: Singer; songwriter
- Instruments: Vocals, guitar
- Years active: 1972–present
- Member of: Decibel

Enrico Ruggeri (born 5 June 1957) is an Italian singer-songwriter.

== Biography ==
A native of Milan, Ruggeri made his debut in the 1970s with the punk band Decibel. In 1981 he began his solo career and established himself as a songwriter: his most famous success in this latter role is "Il mare d'inverno" ("The winter sea"), brought to chart by Loredana Bertè.

He won the Sanremo Music Festival twice: in 1987 with "Si può dare di più" ("You can give more") together with Gianni Morandi and Umberto Tozzi, and in 1993 with "Mistero" ("Mystery"). He represented Italy at Eurovision Song Contest 1993 with the song "Sole d'Europa" ("Sun of Europe").

In 2016 Ruggeri re-joined the newly reformed Decibel and went on to participate in the 2018 edition of the Sanremo Music Festival. A special performance of their song "Lettera dal Duca" during one of the festival nights featured Midge Ure on vocals and guitar.

Ruggeri is a well-known supporter of Inter Milan.

== Discography ==
=== Solo albums ===
- 1981: Champagne molotov
- 1983: Polvere
- 1984: Presente
- 1985: Tutto scorre
- 1986: Difesa francese
- 1986: Enrico VIII
- 1987: Vai Rouge (live)
- 1988: La parola ai testimoni
- 1989: Contatti
- 1990: Il falco e il gabbiano
- 1991: Peter Pan
- 1993: La giostra della memoria
- 1994: Oggetti smarriti
- 1996: Fango e stelle
- 1997: Domani è un altro giorno
- 1998: La gente con alma (in Spanish)
- 1999: L' isola dei tesori
- 2000: L' uomo che vola
- 2001: La vie en rouge (live)
- 2002: La vie en rouge (re-packaging with two new songs)
- 2003: Gli occhi del musicista
- 2004: Punk prima di te
- 2005: Amore e guerra
- 2006: Cuore muscoli e cervello
- 2007: Il regalo di Natale
- 2008: Rock show
- 2009: L'ultima follia di Enrico Ruggeri
- 2009: Il regalo di Natale (re-packaging of "L'ultima follia di Enrico Ruggeri" with three new songs)
- 2010: La ruota
- 2012: Le Canzoni Ai Testimoni
- 2013: Frankenstein
- 2014: Frankenstein 2.0
- 2015: Pezzi di vita
- 2016: Un viaggio incredibile

=== With Decibel ===
- 1977: Punk
- 1980: Vivo da re
- 2017: Noblesse Oblige
- 2018: L'anticristo
- 2019: Punksnotdead (live)

Awards and achievements
| Preceded by Eros Ramazzotti with "Adesso tu" | Sanremo Music Festival; Winner; 1987 | Succeeded by Massimo Ranieri with "Perdere l'amore" |
| Preceded by Luca Barbarossa with "Portami a ballare" | Sanremo Music Festival; Winner; 1993 | Succeeded by Aleandro Baldi with "Passerà" |
| Preceded by Mia Martini with Rapsodia | Italy in the Eurovision Song Contest; 1993 | Succeeded by Jalisse with Fiumi di parole |
