= Passengers (Italian band) =

- Origin: Italy
- Genres: Pop; Italo disco
- Years active: 1979 – 1987
- Labels: DME; London; UAR
- Past members: Kim Arena; Chuck Rolando; Mary Shay Collen; Elwanda Contreras

Passengers (also spelled as I Passengers or The Passengers) were an Italian-American pop/italo disco band, mainly successful in the early eighties.

== History ==
The group formed in 1979, and consisted of two male vocalists (Gesualdo "Kim" Arena, already active from the late 1960s, and Chuck Rolando) and two female vocalists (Mary Shay Collen and Elwanda Contreras).

Produced by Angelo and Felice Piccaredda, Passengers got their first hits in 1980 with the single "He's Speedy Like Gonzales", which ranked tenth at the Italian hit parade, and a cover version of "The Lion Sleeps Tonight". In 1981 and in 1983 they entered the Sanremo Music Festival, respectively with the songs "Midnight" (which peaked at 25th position at the Italian hit parade) and "Movie Star". The group disbanded in 1987.

Chuck Rolando carried on in the music business and in 1992 he became CEO and Managing Director of Sony ATV Music Publishing (Italy), overseeing the administration and creative development of song catalogues for artists such as The Beatles, Bob Dylan and Leonard Cohen.

Kim Arena died in 2004.

== Past members ==
- Gesualdo "Kim" Arena - vocals
- Chuck Rolando - vocals
- Mary Shay Collen - vocals
- Elwanda Contreras - vocals

== Discography ==
Album

- 1979 - Girls Cost Money (Durium, DAI 30334)
- 1980 - Passengers (Durium, DAI 30363)
- 1981 - Casinò (Durium, DAI 30380)
- 1982 - Parade (Durium, LP.S 40159)
- 1983 - Sound Adventure (Durium, DAI 30409)
- 1984 - Buon Compleanno TV (Durium)
- 1985 - New Album (Delta, DEL 8027)
