= Latte e Miele =

- Genre: progressive rock
- Labels: Polydor Records, Magma, Mellow Records

Latte e Miele is an Italian progressive rock musical group.

The group formed in 1971 in Genoa. In 1972 they realized their most famous work, the concept album Passio secundum Mattheum, with part of music inspired by Johann Sebastian Bach and recitatives from the Gospel of Matthew. After having opened the concerts of Van der Graaf Generator, in 1973 they released another concept album, Papillon, and disbanded in 1974.

The group reformed in 1976, with only Alfio Vitanza from the original line-up, and with the name of the group spelled as "LatteMiele". After the album Aquile e scoiattoli, best known for its 23-minutes-suite "Pavana", they gradually abandoned the progressive style and approached pop-rock. After disbanding in the early 1980s, the original line-up reunited in 2008.

== Members ==
=== Current members ===
- Oliviero Lacagnina - keyboards, piano, vocals (1972-1975, 2008–present)
- Giancarlo Marcello Dellacasa - guitar, bass guitar, vocals (1972-1975, 2008–present)
- Alfio Vitanza - drums, flute, vocals (1972-1980, 2008–present)
- Massimo Gori - bass guitar, guitar, vocals (1975-1980, 2008–present)

=== Former Members ===
- Mimmo Damiani - keyboards, guitar, vocals (1975-1976)
- Luciano Poltini - keyboards, vocals (1975-1980, 2011)
- Dario Carlevaro - bass guitar (1980)
- Pino Nastasi - keyboards, programming, backing vocals (2008-2011)

== Discography ==
Albums

- 1972 - Passio Secundum Mattheum
- 1973 - Papillon
- 1976 - Aquile e scoiattoli
- 1992 - Papillon: English version - recorded in 1973
- 1992 - Latte e Miele Live - recorded in 1974
- 1992 - Vampyrs - recorded in 1979
- 2008 - Live Tasting
- 2009 - Marco Polo - Sogni e viaggi
- 2014 - Passio Secundum Mattheum - The Complete Work

Singles

- 1972 - Getzemani/Il re dei Giudei
- 1974 - Rimani nella mia vita/Patetica
- 1974 - Mese di maggio/Tanto amore
- 1976 - Un silenzio diviso in due/Per poter vivere
- 1976 - Un mattino/Pavana
- 1978 - Sto volando con te/Restiamo insieme
- 1979 - Fiore di strada/Severamente proibito
- 1980 - Ritagli di luce/Metro
