= Credo: John Paul II =

- Directed by: Alberto Michelin
- Produced by: Caterina Caselli
- Starring: Andrea Bocelli
- Distributed by: Warner Music
- Release date: 6 July 2006
- Running time: 63 minutes
- Country: Italy
- Languages: English, Italian

Credo: John Paul II is the fourth DVD released by Italian tenor, Andrea Bocelli, celebrating the life of pope John Paul II.

Throughout the DVD, Bocelli sings, in the background, songs from his 1999 album Sacred Arias.

== Overview ==
The DVD contains footage of highlights of John Paul II's pontificate, his spiritual heritage, his most significant meetings with heads of states, but also his contact with people from all over the world, from the day of his election to his funeral.

== Track listing ==
1. Ave Verum Corpus, K. 618 - Mozart
2. Ave Maria - Caccini/Mercurio
3. Sancta Maria - Mascagni, Arr. Mercurio
4. Ave Maria (Arr. Bach's Prelude No.1Bwv 846) - Bach/Gounod
5. Panis Angelicus - Franck, Orch. Michelot
6. Domine Deus (from Petite messe solennelle, Gloria) - Rossini
7. Pietà, Signore - Niedermeyer, Arr. Reynolds
8. Gloria a Te Cristo Gesù (the Hymn of the Great Jubilee)
9. Proteggimi - Orch. Serio/Sartori - F.Sartori/L.Quartotto
10. Frondi tenere...Ombra mai fu (Serse/Act 1) - Händel
11. Mille cherubini in coro - Schubert, Arr. Mercurio
12. Ingemisco (Messa da Requiem) - Verdi
13. Ave Maria "Ellens Gesang III, D839" - Schubert, Orch. Weingartner
14. Agnus Dei - Bizet, Arr. Guiraud
15. Cujus Animam Gementem (Stabat Mater) - Rossini
16. I Believe - Levi
17. Adeste Fideles (O come, all ye faithful) - Trad. Arr. Mercurio
