= Schola Cantorum (Italian vocal group) =

Italian band

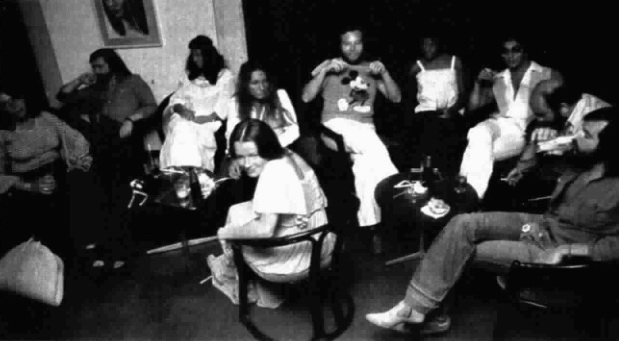
Schola Cantorum in 1975

Schola Cantorum was an Italian vocal group, active between 1974 and 1995.

== Career ==
The group was formed in 1974 by record label RCA Italiana with the double aim of launching some promising performers and exploiting songs they held the rights by producing new, rearranged cover versions of them. Sergio Rendine, Paolo Dossena and Marco Luberti served as producers, with Rendine also serving as arranger.

After taking part to the RAI musical variety Senza Rete, they got their first hit in 1975, with the song "Le tre campane", a cover version of "Les trois cloches" which peaked 7th on the Italian hit parade. The group disbanded in 1980, with several members starting solo careers and some others going on permanent hiatus. It reformed in 1986 with a slightly different line-up, first renaming themselves as Nova Schola Cantorum and later reprising their original name.

== Personnel ==
- Enrico "Kiko" Fusco (1974–95)
- Edoardo De Angelis (1974–78)
- Aldo Donati (1974–78)
- Eddy Viola (1974–95)
- Luisella Mantovani (1974–95)
- Gianna Giovannini (1974–95)
- Marina Arcangeli (1974–86)
- Mimi "Merrill" Gates (1974–86)
- Annie Robert (1974–80)
- Alberto Cheli (1978–95)
- Stefania La Fauci (1993–95)

== Discography ==
Albums

- 1975 – Coromagia (RCA Italiana TPL 1–1108)
- 1975 – Le tre campane (RCA Italiana TPL 1–1182)
- 1976 – Coromagia vol. 2 (RCA Italiana TPL 1–1217)
- 1979 – Il mondo in tasca (RCA Italiana PL-31454)
- 1995 – Schola Cantorum (BMG, 8027428000377)
- 2010 – Ora (Helikonia)
