= Forse (Pupo song) =

Single by Pupo

from the album Gelato al cioccolato
- B-side: "Cercami ancora"
- Released: August 1979
- Recorded: March 1979
- Studio: Country Lane Studios, Munich
- Label: Baby Records
- Songwriter(s): Enzo Ghinazzi; Daniele Pace; Paolo Barabani

Pupo singles chronology
"Ciao" (1978)	"Forse" (1979)	"Su di noi" (1980)

"Forse" (transl. "Maybe") is a 1979 song performed by Italian singer Pupo.

== Track listing ==
No.	Title	Length
1.	"Forse"	3:05
2.	"Cercami ancora"	2:50

== Charts ==
Chart (1979)	Peak position
Italy (Musica e dischi)	4
Switzerland (Schweizer Hitparade)	2
