= Malgioglio =

Malgioglio (pronounced [malˈdʒɔʎʎo]) is an Italian surname from Catania. Notable people with the surname include:

- Astutillo Malgioglio (born 1958), Italian footballer
- Cristiano Malgioglio (born 1945), Italian composer and singer-songwriter
- Isabella Malgioglio, Australian cricketer
