= Enzo Ghinazzi =

Italian singer & lyricist (born 1955)

Pupo
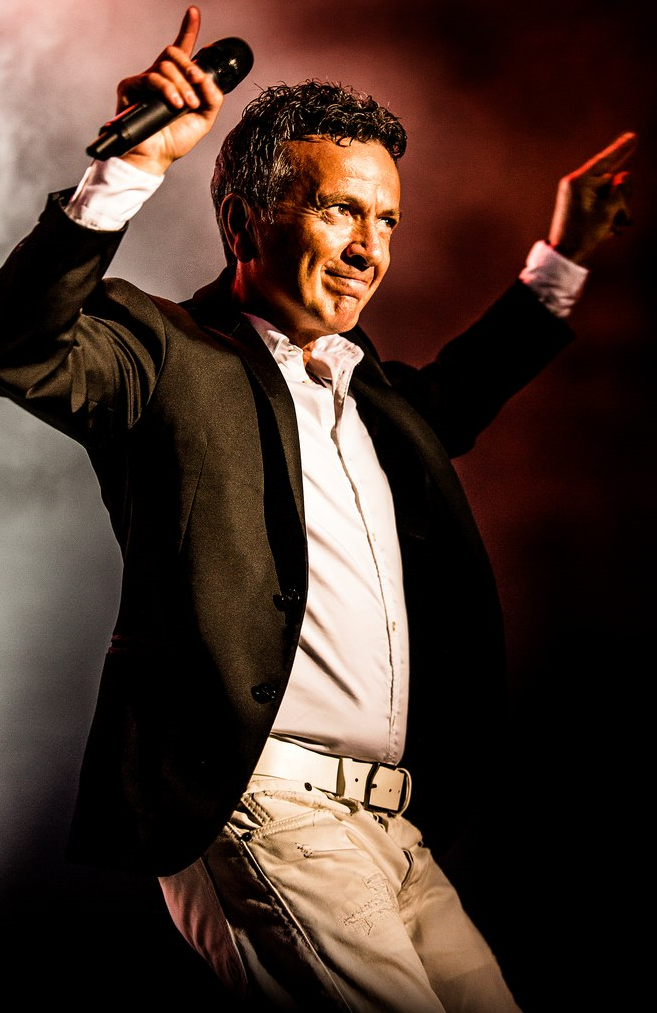
- Pupo in 2015

Background information
- Born: Enzo Ghinazzi; 11 September 1955 (age 70); Ponticino, Tuscany, Italy
- Genres: Pop
- Occupations: Singer; songwriter; television presenter; writer
- Instruments: Vocals; piano
- Years active: 1975–present
- Labels: Baby Records; CGD; Discomagic Records; Ariola Records; Pull; Jolly (record company); UMG
- Website: pupo.tv

Enzo Ghinazzi (Italian pronunciation: [ˈɛntso ɡiˈnattsi]; born 11 September 1955), best known as Pupo (pronounced [ˈpuːpo]), is an Italian singer, lyricist, television presenter and writer.

== Life and career ==
Enzo Ghinazzi was born in Ponticino, a frazione of Laterina Pergine Valdarno in the Tuscan province of Arezzo. His father was a mailman and his mother was a housewife, but they both cultivated interests in singing and acting. In 1975 he debuted as a singer-songwriter under the stage name Pupo with "Ti scriverò" ("I will write to you").

Pupo's first album release, Come sei bella ("You are so beautiful"), came in 1976. His second album, Gelato al cioccolato, was his first major success, containing the hit singles "Ciao" and "Gelato al cioccolato", written with Cristiano Malgioglio; the album was the artist's first of 11 gold records. In 1980 Pupo competed for the first time in the Sanremo Music Festival with the gold record winning song "Su di noi" ("Above us"): the song was included in his third album Più di prima ("More than before"), which was Pupo's best selling record and also included "Firenze Santa Maria Novella", a love letter to the city of Florence.

In 1981 he wrote his first hit for another artist, "Sarà perché ti amo", sung by Ricchi e Poveri at the Sanremo Festival that year. Pupo competed again in the Festival in 1983 with "Cieli azzurri" ("Blue skies") and in 1984 with "Un amore grande" ("A big love"), written by Umberto Tozzi and Giancarlo Bigazzi. In 1986 he released the album Pupo in the USSR, a major success that sparked his fame in Eastern Europe. The following year he won the international children's song festival Zecchino d'Oro as the author of "Canzone amica" ("Friend song"). Pupo toured extensively on international stages, and in 1991 he released his first and to date only live album, Canada's Wonderland, recorded in Toronto. In 1992 he competed for the fourth time at the Sanremo Music Festival, this time under his birth name, with the spiritual "La mia preghiera" ("My prayer").

After spending some years out of the national spotlight (while maintaining a solid international fanbase) and then devoting himself to his television career, Pupo rose back to musical stardom with his consecutive appearances at the Sanremo Music Festival in 2009 and 2010. In 2007, the Dutch singer André Hazes covered his song "Forse" ("Maybe") with the title "Blijf bij mi" ("Stay with me"). In 2009 he competed with "L'opportunità" ("The opportunity"), singing alongside Paolo Belli and Youssou N'Dour, reaching the finals. The year after, he came second in the Festival singing "Italia amore mio" with tenor Luca Canonici and Emanuele Filiberto of Savoy, member of the former Italian royal family; in the "guest night" of the Festival, World Cup winning football coach Marcello Lippi was invited on stage.

Following a two-year hiatus due to the COVID-19 pandemic, Pupo resumed international touring in 2022 with his "40 Anni Su Di Noi" live show. This initial concert series included performances across Australian cities like Perth, Sydney and Melbourne, alongside European theaters throughout Switzerland, Belgium, Germany and Luxembourg as well as outdoor summer venues across Italy. Because of steady ticket demand, the tour expanded with global itineraries, extending through 2023.

== Television career, voice acting and writing ==
Pupo started working in television in 1989, when he was called to host Domenica In on Rai 1. In the 2000s he appeared often in football shows, as a supporter of the Serie A club Fiorentina. Pupo focused fully on his television career starting from 2005, starting with the reality show La fattoria on Canale 5 as a reporter from the Brazilian set.

He achieved great success hosting game shows on Rai 1, the Italian public broadcaster's main channel: from Affari Tuoi (the Italian edition of Deal or No Deal) to Reazione a Catena, the Italian adaptation of Chain Reaction. He then hosted the Italian edition of The Singing Bee, called Chi fermerà la musica, and three editions of the talent show I raccomandati on Rai 1. Since 2010, Pupo hosts the annual festival of Neapolitan music Napoli prima e dopo, which under his tenure has averaged over three million viewers with a 20% audience share on Rai 1.

He also featured as an announcer on Sky Sports with La notte del poker, and he competed in the celebrity edition of the championship.

Meanwhile, Pupo started voice acting in Italian: he played Hammy in the DreamWorks animated movie Over the Hedge and the titular character in the 2010 comedy Marmaduke. He also hosted radio shows on Rai Radio 1, such as Attenti a Pupo and Passato contro futuro.

Pupo also wrote three books. His first autobiography, Un enigma chiamato Pupo ("A mystery named Pupo"), was published in 2001 by Rai Eri (the publishing branch of the Italian public broadcaster). His second autobiography, Banco Solo! Diario di un giocatore chiamato Pupo ("Only bank! Diary of a player called Pupo"), deals with his troubled history with gambling. Pupo then wrote a noir novel, La confessione ("The confession"), published by Rizzoli in 2012.

Pupo admitted in March 2016 that he has had sex with men and transgender people. He also confirmed having both a wife and a partner, although he said he rejects the label of being bigamist, since bigamy is illegal and his wife and his mistress do not live together. He's an atheist, but sometimes goes to church because he considers religion part of Italian popular culture.

== Controversy relating to Russian war against Ukraine ==
In January 2022, a month before the Russian invasion of Ukraine, Ghinazzi announced that he had been notified by the Ministry of Foreign Affairs that he had been banned from entering Ukraine. This ban came as a result of Ghinazzi, a year prior, performing at a Russian war song festival in Yalta, Crimea.

After initially withholding concert performances in Russia in 2023, Ghinazzi returned to Moscow in 2024. On March 15, 2024 Ghinazzi performed a concert together with Russian artists at the Kremlin Palace where he declared:"Enough with this war between Russian and Ukrainian brothers. I will go to Kyiv if they want me." After the Moscow concert Ghinazzi was banned from entering Lithuania.

== Awards ==
- 11 gold records
- Gondola d'Oro ("Golden gondola")

== Discography ==
=== Albums ===
- Come sei bella (1976)
- Gelato al cioccolato (1979)
- Più di prima (1980)
- Lo devo solo a te (1981)
- Cieli azzurri (1983)
- Malattia d'amore (1984)
- Change generation (1985)
- La vita è molto di più (1986)
- Quello che sono (1989)
- Canada's Wonderland (1991)
- Enzo Ghinazzi 1 (1992)
- Pupo 1996 (1995)
- Tornerò (1998)
- Sei caduto anche tu (2000)
- I grandi successi originali (2004)
- L'equilibrista (2004)
- Porno contro amore (2016)
- Insieme (2025)

=== Singles ===
- "Ti scriverò" (1975)
- "Come sei bella" (1977)
- "Io solo senza te" (1977)
- "Sempre tu" (1977)
- "Ciao" (1978)
- "Forse" (1979)
- "Su di noi" (1980)
- "Cosa farai" (1980)
- "Cercami ancora" (1980)
- "Lo devo solo a te" (1981)
- "Nashville" (1982)
- "Ancora io" (1982)
- "E va bene così" (1983)
- "Cieli azzurri" (1983)
- "Un amore grande" (1984)
- "Change generation" (1985)
- "La vita è molto di più" (1986)
- "Amore italiano" (1987)
- "Dove sarai domani" (1989)
- "Bambina" (1991)
- "La mia preghiera" (1992)
- "Senza fortuna" (1995)
- "La notte" (1996)
- "In eternità" (1997)
- "Non è un addio" (1998)
- "È Fiorentina" (1999)
- "Sei caduto anche tu" (2001)
- "L'opportunità" (2009)
- "Italia amore mio" (2010)
- "Il rischio enorme di pedersi" (2020)
- "Avere vent'anni" (2020)
- "Fuori dal gregge" (2021)
- "I colori della tua mente" (2021)
- "Centro del mondo" (2023)
- "Tricolore" (2024)

== Bibliography ==
- Un enigma chiamato Pupo (2001)
- Banco Solo! Diario di un giocatore chiamato Pupo (2005)
- La confessione (2011)

== See also ==
- List of best-selling music artists
