= La Bottega dell'Arte =

Italian pop music group

- Origin: Rome, Italy
- Genres: Pop
- Years active: 1974–1985
- Past members: Piero Calabrese; Massimo Calabrese; Romano Musumarra; Fernando Ciucci; Alberto Bartoli

La Bottega dell'Arte (also spelled just as Bottega dell'Arte) were an Italian pop band active between 1974 and 1985.

== Career ==
The group formed in 1974 in Rome. Between 1976 and 1977 they had three singles charting between the fifth and the seventh place on the Italian hit parade. In 1980 the group entered the main competition at the Sanremo Music Festival with the song "Più di una canzone". The group disbanded in 1985, with the members pursuing solo careers as producers, composers and musicians.

== Members ==
- Piero Calabrese (1958–2016) – keyboards, vocals
- Massimo Calabrese (1955–) – bass guitar, guitar, vocals
- Romano Musumarra (1956–) – keyboards, flute, guitars and vocals
- Fernando Ciucci (1952–2011) – guitars and vocals
- Alberto Bartoli (1955–) – drums

== Discography ==
Albums

- 1975: La Bottega dell'Arte (EMI Italiana, 3C-064-18106)
- 1977: Dentro (EMI Italiana, 3C-064-18248)
- 1979: L'avventura (EMI Italiana, 3C064-18423)
- 1980: La Bottega dell'Arte (EMI Italiana, 3C-064-18493)
- 1984: Forza 4 (New Sound, NWLP 1701)
