= Jo Chiarello =

Italian singer

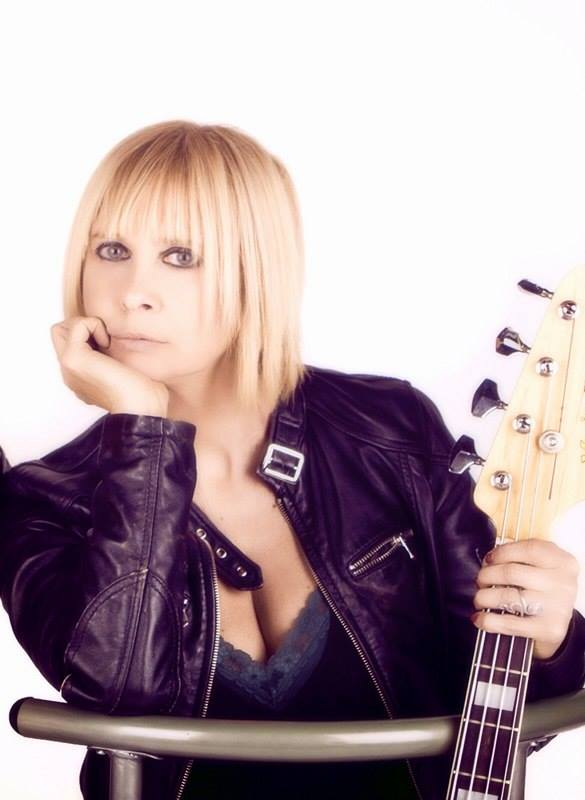
- Born: Maria Concetta Chiarello; 14 May 1963 (age 62); Palermo, Italy
- Occupation: Singer

Maria Concetta Chiarello (born 14 May 1963), known as Jo Chiarello, is an Italian singer, mainly active in the 1980s.

== Life and career ==
Born in Palermo, at sixteen years old Chiarello won a beauty contest, Miss Teenager, being noted by one of the juror, the singer-songwriter Franco Califano, who decided to produce her as a singer. She entered the competition at the 31st edition of the Sanremo Music Festival, with the song "Che brutto affare".

After a series of singles characterized by ironical and mischievous lyrics, in the second half of the 1980s Chiarello opted for a more mature repertoire, and in 1988 she won the Un disco per l'estate festival with the song "Ma che bella storia d'amore". In 1989 she returned to compete at the Sanremo Music Festival, placing second in the Newcomers section with the song "Io e il cielo". Following the release of her 1993 album Prima le donne e i bambini she significantly slowed her activities.
