= Amore (Andrea Bocelli album) =

2006 studio album by Andrea Bocelli

Studio album by Andrea Bocelli
- Released: 31 January 2006
- Recorded: Record Plant Studios, Hollywood, CA; Chartmaker Studios, Los Angeles, CA; Andrea Bocelli Studio Pierpaolo Guerrini, Tuscany, Italy; Sony Studios, Culver City, CA; Westlake Audio, Hollywood, CA
- Genres: Ballad; classical; pop
- Length: 57:32
- Labels: Sugar; Universal; Decca
- Producers: David Foster; Humberto Gatica; Tony Renis

Andrea Bocelli chronology
Andrea (2004)	Amore (2006)	The Best of Andrea Bocelli: Vivere (2007)

Amor

Studio album by Andrea Bocelli
- Released: 28 February 2006
- Genres: Ballad, Pop, Latin
- Length: 57:32
- Label: Universal Latino
- Producers: David Foster, Humberto Gatica

Andrea Bocelli chronology
Andrea (the spanish version) (2004)	Amor (2006)	Lo Mejor de Andrea Bocelli: Vivire (2007)

Amore is the eleventh studio album by Italian tenor Andrea Bocelli, released on 31 January 2006, for the Valentine's Day season. This album features a remake of Elvis Presley's "Can't Help Falling in Love"; "Because We Believe", the closing song of the 2006 Winter Olympics in Turin, Italy, which Bocelli wrote and performed; "Somos Novios (It's Impossible), a duet with American pop singer Christina Aguilera; and his first recording of Bésame Mucho, which eventually became one of his signature songs.

== Releases ==
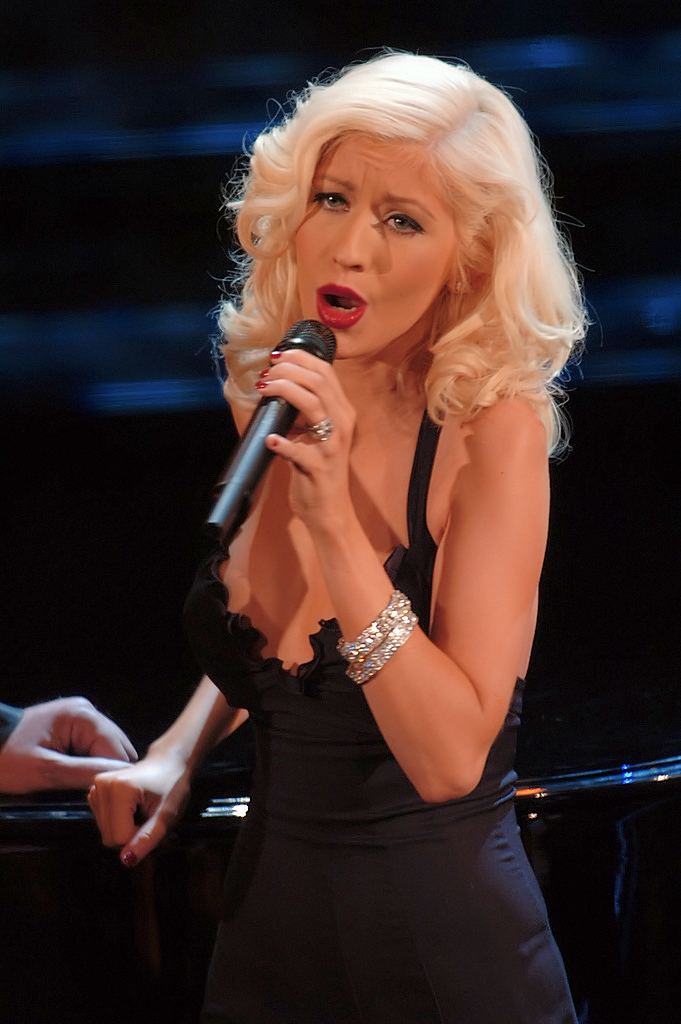
Aguilera performing "Somos Novios" with Bocelli during the Sanremo Music Festival, 2006

Amore was released internationally beginning on 28 February 2006.

A Spanish version of the album was also released in the same year, called Amor.

In Japan it was released on 18 October 2006 as Anata ni Okuru Ai no Uta (貴方に贈る愛の歌; A Love Song I Send to You) and featured a bonus track.

== Track listing ==
=== For Amore ===
1. "Amapola" – 3:43
2. "Besame Mucho" – 4:01
3. "Les Feuilles Mortes (Autumn Leaves)" – 4:49
4. "Mi Manchi" (feat. Kenny G) – 3:35
5. "Somos Novios (It's Impossible)" (feat. Christina Aguilera) – 4:22
6. "Solamente Una Vez" – 3:29
7. "Jurame" – 3:22
8. "Pero te Extraño" – 4:06
9. "Canzoni Stonate" (feat. Stevie Wonder) – 5:17
10. "L'Appuntamento (Sentado à Beira do Caminho)" – 4:08
11. "Cuando Me Enamoro (Quando m'innamoro)" – 3:56
12. "Can't Help Falling in Love" – 3:25
13. "Because We Believe" – 4:37
14. "Ama Credi e Vai (Because We Believe)" – 4:41

Japan bonus track

15. "Somos Novios (It's Impossible)" (feat. Rimi Natsukawa)

=== For Amor, the Spanish version of the album ===
1. "Besame Mucho"
2. "Cancion Desafinada" (Spanish version of Canzoni Stonate with Stevie Wonder)
3. "Solamente Una Vez" (Original version in Spanish of You Belong To My Heart)
4. "Somos Novios (It's Impossible)" (with Christina Aguilera)
5. "Jurame" (with Mario Reyes) – 3:22
6. "Pero te Extraño"
7. "Las Hojas Muertas" (Spanish version of Autumn Leaves)
8. "Momentos"
9. "Me Faltas "Mi Manchi" (with Kenny G)
10. "Cuando Me Enamoro" (Spanish version of Quando m'innamoro)
11. "Porque Tu Me Acostumbraste"
12. "Amapola"
13. Verano Estate (with Chris Botti)
14. "Nuestro Encuentro" (Spanish version of L'Appuntamento)

== Commercial performance ==
With 113,000 units sold in its first week of release, Amore debuted at No. 3 on the Billboard 200 chart, which at the time was Bocelli's highest chart position in America yet, only to be surpassed by his 2009 release My Christmas, which reached No. 2. It went on to sell 1.66 million copies in the United States and was certified Platinum by the RIAA. Bocelli was the seventh best-selling artist of 2006, in the United States, with 2,524,681 copies of his albums sold that year. The Spanish version, Amor, was also certified Album Multi-Platino (Double Platinum) by the RIAA. Both versions were also certified Gold and Platinum in several other countries.

== Charts ==
=== Weekly charts ===
Chart (2006)	Peak position
Australian Albums (ARIA)	5
Austrian Albums (Ö3 Austria)	4
Belgian Albums (Ultratop Flanders)	2
Belgian Albums (Ultratop Wallonia)	10
Canadian Albums (Billboard)	3
Croatian International Albums (HDU)	1
Danish Albums (Hitlisten)	15
Dutch Albums (Album Top 100)	1
Finnish Albums (Suomen virallinen lista)	1
French Albums (SNEP)	14
German Albums (Offizielle Top 100)	23
Hungarian Albums (MAHASZ)	1
Irish Albums (IRMA)	2
Italian Albums (FIMI)	2
Japanese Albums (Oricon)	39
Mexican Albums (Top 100 Mexico)	1
New Zealand Albums (RMNZ)	13
Norwegian Albums (VG-lista)	3
Portuguese Albums (AFP)	2
Scottish Albums (Official Charts)	6
Spanish Albums (Promusicae)	4
Swedish Albums (Sverigetopplistan)	2
Swiss Albums (Schweizer Hitparade)	8
UK Albums (Official Charts)	4
US Billboard 200	3
US Top Classical Albums (Billboard)	1
US Top Latin Albums (Billboard) Amore	2

=== Year-end charts ===
Chart (2006)	Position
Australian Albums (ARIA)	80
Austrian Albums (Ö3 Austria)	59
Belgian Albums (Ultratop Flanders)	26
Dutch Albums (Album Top 100)	4
French Albums (SNEP)	129
Hungarian Albums (MAHASZ)	8
Italian Albums (FIMI)	25
Mexican Albums (Top 100 Mexico) Amor	14
Swedish Albums (Sverigetopplistan)	12
UK Albums (OCC)	60
US Billboard 200	30
US Top Latin Albums (Billboard) Amor	16

== Certifications and sales ==
Region	Certification	Certified units/sales
Argentina (CAPIF) Spanish edition	Platinum	40,000^{^}
Austria (IFPI Austria)	Gold	15,000^{*}
Brazil (Pro-Música Brasil)	Platinum	60,000^{*}
Canada (Music Canada)	Platinum	100,000^{^}
Ecuador	—	9,000
Finland (Musiikkituottajat)	Platinum	49,369
Hungary (MAHASZ)	Platinum	10,000^{^}
Ireland (IRMA)	Platinum	15,000^{^}
Mexico (AMPROFON) for Amor	Platinum	100,000^{^}
Netherlands (NVPI)	Platinum	70,000^{^}
New Zealand (RMNZ)	Gold	7,500^{^}
Norway (IFPI Norway)	Platinum	40,000^{*}
Poland (ZPAV)	Platinum	20,000^{*}
Portugal (AFP)	Gold	10,000^{^}
Russia (NFPF)	Platinum	20,000^{*}
Spain (Promusicae)	Gold	40,000^{^}
Switzerland (IFPI Switzerland)	Gold	15,000^{^}
United Kingdom (BPI)	Platinum	300,000^{^}
United States (RIAA)	Platinum	1,660,000
United States (RIAA) for Amor	2× Platinum (Latin)	200,000^{^}
Summaries
Europe (IFPI)	Platinum	1,000,000^{*}
^{*} Sales figures based on certification alone.^{^} Shipments figures based on certification alone.

== Personnel ==
- Veronica Berti: Vocals on "Les Feuilles Mortes (Autumn Leaves)"
- Kenny G: Saxophone on "Mi Manchi"
- Christina Aguilera: Vocals on "Somos Novios (It's Impossible)"
- Marco Borsato: Vocals on "Because We Believe"
- Mario Reyes: Flamenco guitar on "Jurame"
- Stevie Wonder: Harmonica and additional vocals on "Canzoni Stonate"
- David Foster and Randy Waldman: Acoustic piano and keyboards
- Nathan East: Bass
- Russell Powell: guitars
- Vinnie Colaiuta: Drums
- Dean Parks, Ramon Stagnaro, Michael Thompson, Corrado Sgandurra, Michael Landau: Guitars
- Paulinho Da Costa and Rafael Padilla: Percussion
- Dan Higgins: Flute
- David Foster: Arrangement
- Jorge Calandrelli and David Foster: Arrangement on " Amapola"
- Humberto Gatica, Chartmaker Studios: Mixing
- Hernan Gatica, Pierpaolo Guerinni, Valerio Calisse, Jochem van der Saag, and Alejando Rodriguez: Recording
- Neil Devor and Chris Brooke: Additional engineering
- Oscar Ramirez: Additional Pro-Tools engineering on "Somos Novios (It's Impossible)"
- Jochem van der Saag: Programming and sound design

== See also ==
- Under the Desert Sky the CD/DVD package of a pop concert for the album
