= 1977 in Italian television =

This is a list of Italian television related events from 1977.

== Events ==
=== RAI ===
- 1 January. Last airing of Carosello (Carousel), the advertising program broadcast by RAI every evening since 1957. The final show is a dancing and singing exhibition by Raffaella Carrà, sponsored by Fernet Stock. Despite the popularity of Carosello, its formula (mini-films and cartoons, about two minutes long) is considered obsolete by the advertising agencies, which by now prefer the spots, as they are shorter (thirty seconds) and more effective.
- 20 January. The socialist Paolo Grassi, former director of Piccolo Teatro and La Scala, is nominated as the new RAI president. Under his leadership, the company enjoys for three years a freedom from political authorities. The experiment would never be repeated.
- 1 February. RAI begins, after six months of experimentation, the official broadcastings in color. The first shows aired, on RAI 1, are the television film The suicide club, of the series Mystery and Imagination, and an ABBA concert. The next day, RAI 2 airs the first film in color, The Arrangement. Followed by the turn of the first TV journal (21 February) and of the first RAI fiction (The fatal eggs, 27 February, see below). However, the complete switch-off of black and white will need two years. In a time of deep economic crisis, the color sets are above the means of many Italian families.
- 5 March – Homo Sapiens wins the Sanremo festival with Bella da morire. For the first time the event, hosted by Mike Bongiorno and Maria Giovanna Elmi, is broadcast in colors.
- 26 March - on Easter evening, RAI broadcasts the first episode of Jesus of Nazareth by Franco Zeffirelli. On Italy, it's the TV event of the year and the first great success of the TV in colors, getting an average of 26,7 million viewers for episode (record of the year).
- 22 April. - Fifteen years after the Canzonissima scandal, Dario Fo and Franca Rame come back in RAI with an anthology of their most famous pieces. The first play, Mistero Buffo, arouses the protests of the Vatican and a complaint for contempt of religion. Nonetheless, the cycle goes on regularly and without censures.
- 27 May. - The RAI production Padre Padrone by the Taviani brothers, is the first television film to win the Cannes festival.
- 3 June. - Emilio Rossi, director of TG1, is shot in the legs by the Red Brigades.

=== Private channels. ===
In Italy, 256 private channels are registered, but only 80 are really active; they are reunited in two organizations, the National Consortium of Free TV and the catholic FIEL.

- 17 April. In Abruzzo, Teleadriatica is the first Italian private channel to broadcast live a football match (the regional derby Pescara-Sanbenedettese, shoot from the balcony of a private house). The next week, the Lega Nazionale Professionisti authorizes Teleadriatica to air a synthesis of the Pescara's matches.
- 2 May. In Milan, Antenna Nord, owned by the right-wing editor Edilio Rusconi, begins to broadcast. Rusconi, proprietary of other TV channels in Rome, Florence and Veneto, is, by now, the most potent tycoon of the Italian private television.
- 21 October. Tele Torino International airs Let's strip together ("Spogliamoci insieme"), a sexy quiz with strip-teases performed by amateurish housewives; the program gets wide resonance on the press, also outside Italy, and is largely imitated by other local televisions. The Turin channel is known for another trash show, Tomorrow we die, with surgeries executed on air.
- 3 November. In Legnano, the channel Antenna 3, with Enzo Tortora as vice-president, begins to broadcast.

== Debuts ==
=== Variety ===
- Portobello – with Enzo Tortora, who comes back in RAI after eight years of "exile" for contrasts with the company. In Portobello, as in an ideal street market, collectors or sellers, eccentric inventors, lonely hearts, people looking for lost friends, are put in contact with the public at home that intervenes by phone; mascot of the show is a mute parrot, become proverbial. The show, also if often accused of sentimentalism, is for years one of the most loved by the Italian public, till the Tortora's judiciary troubles, and then his death, cause his suspension.
- Apriti, sabato (Saturday, open) – talk show on Saturday afternoon, hosted by Paolo Frajese.
- Buonasera con... (Good evening with) – show for children, including cartoons and sitcoms; it introduces in Italy the mecha cartoons.
- Discoring – musical show, ideated and hosted, in the first editions, by Gianni Boncompagni; it's, till to Eighties, the most popular TV show of it its kind.
- Piccolo slam (Little slam) – musical show, aimed to the young public, with Stefania Rotolo and Sammy Bardot; 2 seasons. The program introduces the disco music in the Italian television; among the special guests, there is also a young Jodie Foster in a dancing performance.
- Gioco città (City game) – show for children, with Claudio Sorrentino and the Miracles Alley Cats.
- Non stop – by Enzo Trapani. The show is innovative for the absence of a presenter, the fast pace and the use of the color; it reveals many young comic actors as Carlo Verdone and groups as The grimace (with a debuting Massimo Troisi), The Miracle Alley cats and The Giancattivi (with Francesco Nuti).

=== News and educational ===
- Check-up – medicine magazine.
- Spazio libero (Free space) – "access programs" broadcast by RAI but autonomously produced by cultural, political or religious associations.
- Eurogol – sport magazine about the UEFA cups.
- Sereno variabile (Serene Variable) – travel magazine, again on air in 2019; entered in the Guinness World Records because hosted for 42 years by the same person, Osvaldo Bevilacqua.
- Dolly - cinema column, care of Claudio G. Fava.
- Tam tam – in-depth magazine, care of Arrigo Petacco.

=== Serials ===
In 1977, RAI increases considerably the importation of American serials.

- United States Happy days
- United States Fury; the "Western horse" becomes the Italian children's favorite, also if his adventures are in black and white and twenty years old.

=== For children ===
- Supergulp! – show of cartoons and semi-animated comcis, care of Giancalro Governi and Guido De Maria; 4 seasons.

=== Foreign and private channels ===
- Montecarlo sera (Montecarlo evening) – news magazine on Telemontecarlo.
- Paroliamo – quiz on Telemontecarlo, hosted by Lea Pericoli.
- Quelli della girandola (The Catherine wheel people) – tutorial show on RSI
- Superclassifica show (Super hit parade show) – musical show on Telemilano, care of the magazine TV Sorrisi e canzoni and hosted by Maurizio Seymandi; migrated on Canale 5, it becomes one of the most popular show of the Fininvest network and goes on till 2001.
- Gran Prix (Antenna Nord, then Italia 1) – motorsport magazine, hosted by Andrea de Adamich; lasted till 2015.

== Television shows ==
=== Drama and comedy ===
- Oedipus rex, from the Sophocles' tragedy, directed and interpreted by Vittorio Gassman, with Lea Massari, Tino Buazzelli, Adolfo Celi and Gigi Proietti. The tragedy is sided by a making-of, aired the previous evening (Gassmann, una bottega per il teatro), precious witness about the great actor's working methods.
- Il gabbiano (The seagull) – by Marco Bellocchio, from the Chekhov's play, with Remo Girone, Laura Betti and Pamela Villoresi.
- Richard III – by Carmelo Bene (also protagonist), from the Shakespeare's play.
- Bene! Quattro modi diversi di morire in versi (Four different ways of dying in verses) – Carmelo Bene's recital, reading verses of four Russian poets (Mayakovsky, Blok, Yesenin and Pasternak).
- La mossa del cavallo (The knight’s move) by Giacomo Colli; – cycle of six chamber dramas, each with a twisted ending.
- Gli ultimi tre giorni (The last three days) – by Gianfranco Mingozzi; reconstruction of the Anteo Zamboni's assassination attempt to Benito Mussolini.

=== Comedy ===
- Il teatro di Dario Fo (see over)
- L’hotel du libre èchange by Georges Feydeau, directed by Flaminio Bollini, with Franco Parenti and Scilla Gabel.
- Valentina una ragazza che ha fretta (Valentina, hurry girl) – by Vito Molinari, with Elisabetta Viviani; remake of the musical comedy of 1959 about time travels by the same Molinari.
- La granduchessa e i camerieri (The noblewoman and the servants) – musical comedy by Garinei and Giovannini, directed by Gino Landi, with Valentina Cortese and Franco e Ciccio.

=== Miniseries ===
==== Period dramas ====
- Il fauno di marmo (The marble faun) – by Silverio Blasi, with Donato Placido and Marina Malfatti, from the Hawthorne's novel; in three episodes.
- Castigo (Punishment) – by Anton Giulio Majano, from the Matilde Serao's novel, with Eleonora Giorgi, in five episodes; period drama with paranormal implications.
- Processo a Maria Tarnowska (The Maria Tarnowska trial) – by Claudio Fina, with Rada Rassimov and Umberto Orsini; 3 episodes.
- Un anno di scuola (A school year) – by Franco Giraldi, from a Giani Stuparich's tale; two episodes. In Trieste, at the eve of the First World War, the story of a non-conformist girl, the only female student of her class.
- Una donna (A woman) – by Gianni Bongioanni, with Giuliana De Sio (in her first starring role), from the Sibilla Aleramo's autobiographic novel, in six episodes; at the beginning of the century, a woman fights for freedom by an oppressive marriage. It's the first RAI fiction with an explicitly feministic message.
- Don Giovanni in Sicilia (A Sicilian Don Juan) – by Guglielmo Morandi, with Domenico Modugno and Rosanna Schiaffino, from the Vitaliano Brancati's novel.
- La paga del sabato (Saturday's pay) – from Beppe Fenoglio's novel, by Sandro Bolchi, with Lino Capolicchio; in the after-war Piedmaont, a former partisan becomes a robber.

==== Bipiscs and historical dramas ====
- Jesus of Nazareth – by Franco Zeffirelli, with Robert Powell in the title role and a stellar cast, in five episodes. It's acclaimed by the Church and by the general public while the critics generally consider it a spectacular but stereotyped work, without any deep spirituality.
- Il passatore (The smuggler), by Pietro Nelli, with Luigi Diberti in the title role, script by Tonino Guerra, in three episodes; the true story of a brigand in the nineteenth-century Romagna.
- Lo scandalo della banca romana (The Banca romana scandal) – by Luigi Perelli, with Ivo Garrani, in three episodes.
- Sacco e Vanzetti – by Giacomo Colli, with Achille Millo and Franco Graziosi in the title roles, from Reginald Rose's The Sacco-Vanzetti story, in two episodes.
- Ligabue – by Salvatore Nocita, from a Cesare Zavattini's script, with Flavio Bucci, in three episodes; the life of the mad painter Antonio Ligabue, considered the Italian Van Gogh.
- Non ho tempo (I don't have time) –with Fabio Gamba as Evariste Galois and Elogio di Gaspard Monge, fatto da lui stesso (Gaspard Monge's eulogy, by hiimself) with Piero Vida; the director applies the Brecht’s technique of the distancing effect to the TV biopic .
- Spia – Il caso Philby (Spy, the Philby affair) by Gian Pietro Calasso, with Luigi Pistilli in the title role.

==== Comedy ====
- Il superspia (The super-spy) detective comedy by Eros Macchi, with Renzo Montagnani as a barber would-be detective; 3 episodes.

==== Mystery and fantastic ====
- Uova fatali (The fatal eggs) – by Ugo Gregoretti, with Gastone Moschin, from the Michail Bulgakov's novel, in two episodes; the first RAI fiction aired in colors, with special effects, as the Chroma key, by then forefront.
- La gabbia (The cage) – by Carlo Tuzi, with Miguel Bosè, in two episodes; inspired by the Stanford prison experiment.
- Il nero muove (Black moves) – by Gianni Serra, in two episodes; about the right-wing terrorism.
- Gli occhi del drago (The dragon's eyes) – by Piero Schivazappa, in two episodes; a Japanese motorcycle leads its owners to madness.
- Traffico d'armi nel golfo (Arms traffic in the Gulf) – by Leonardo Cortese, with Giancarlo Zanetti and Lorenza Guerrieri, from Francis Durbridge's The World of Tim Frazer it ends the long row of Italian adaptations from the English mystery writer.
- Chiunque tu sia (Whoever you are) history of industrial espionage by Mario Foglietti, with Giuseppe Pambieri and Paola Pitagora.
- L’ultimo aereo per Venezia (Last airplane for Venice) – by Daniele D’Anza, with Nando Gazzolo, Marina Malfatti and Massimo Girotti; 8 episodes. Crime story with a rather original construction (each episode is told from the point of view of a different character).

==== For children ====
- Orzowei, il figlio della savana (Orzowei, the savannah's son) by Yves Allegret, with Peter Marshall and Stanley Baker in his last role, from the Alberto Manzi's novel, in thirteen episodes.
- Saturnino Farandola – by Raffaele Meloni, with Mariano Rigillo, in thirteen episodes, from Albert Robida's Saturnin Farandoul, parody of the Jules Verne's novels.
- Porfirio e Pepe – cartoon by Toni Pagot, with the Peppino De Filippo voice, about a gang of merry Neaples cats.

=== Variety ===
- Automobili (Cars) – musical variety ideated and hosted by Lucio Dalla, inspired by his passion for the motors, and directed by Luigi Perelli.
- L'amico della notte (The friend of the night) – musical show with Gigliola Cinquetti.
- A modo mio (On my way) – with Memo Remigi and a different female guest star for every episode.
- Arrivano i mostri (The monsters are comning) - summer variety set in a circus, with Coch Ponzoni, Lino Banfi and the two giant animals (a snake and an iguana) realized for The fatal eggs (see over).
- Auditorio A (Auditorium A) – musical show; it reveals to the wide public the singers of the "New Naples sound", as Pino Daniele.
- Bambole, non c'è una lira (Dolls, there is not a lira) – by Antonello Falqui, with Pippo Franco, Christian De Sica and Isabella Biagini; the story of Italy from 1935 to 1960, through the performances of a down-at-heel avanspettacolo company.
- Il borsacchiotto - game show with Carlo Croccolo.
- C’era una volta (Once upon a time) – celebrative program about the most famous show of italian television, hosted by Alberto Lupo.
- E adesso andiamo a incominciare (And now, let’s begin) – show set in a circus, with Luigi Pistilli and Gabriella Ferri.
- Il guazzabuglio (The hodgepodge) – comic variety with Aroldo Tieri, Giuliana Lojodice and Giampiero Albertini.
- Noi no (We not) – by Romolo Siena, with Raimondo Vianello and Sandra Mondaini; the Sandra's show (a traditional variety, in color) is constantly alternated to the Raimondo's one (a parody of the intellectualistic cabaret, in black and white).
- Quantunque io (Notwithstanding I) – satiric show by Romolo Siena, with Enrico Montesano; the Roman comedian, beyond to perform some irreverent impersonation of politicians, creates here his most famous character, the "romantic Englishwoman", naively enthusiast of Italy. It's the first RAI variety aired in colors.
- Rita ed io (Rita and me) – by Eros Macchi, with Rita Pavone.
- Scuola serale per aspiranti italiani (Evening school for aspirant Italians) – satire of custom by Enzo Trapani.
- Secondo voi (You think) – show combined with the Lotteria Italia, hosted by Pippo Baudo; remembered for the debut of Tullio Solenghi and Beppe Grillo.

=== News and educational ===
- Concerto per Michelangelo (Concert for Michelangelo), last direction by Roberto Rossellini; documentary about the Sistine Chapel.
- La forza della democrazia (The power of democracy) – enquiry in three episodes, by Corrado Stajano and Marco Fini, about the Piazza Fontana bombing and the strategy of tension.
- Si dice donna (You say woman) – enquiry by Tilde Capomazza about female condition in Italy.
- Il petrolio e la vita nuova (Petrolium and the new life) – in four episodes, by Alberto Moravia and Goffredo Parise, reportage about the Persian Gulf states.
- Viaggio in seconda classe (Travel in economic class) – by Nanni Loy. Fourteen years after Specchio segreto, the director goes back to the candid camera, but now with a more accentuated sociologic purpose (to study the Italians as appear in the popular trains.)
- Testimoni oculari (Eyewitness), care of Gianni Bisiach, reckoning of witnesses about recent history; in the most significant episode, two Italian presidents (Saragat and Pertini) relives their escape from the Nazi jail in Rome.
- Il ventre di Napoli – Una giornata nella città del sole (The belly of Naples, a day in the city of the sun) – documentary by Marisa Malfatti and Riccardo Tortora.

==== Music and entertainment ====
- Teatro musica (Theatre and music) – entertainment magazine.
- La Scala e i suoi protagonisti (La Scala and its protagonists) - in six episodes, by Dora Ossenska.
- Sergio Endrigo, Diario veneto – by Carlo Tuzii; documentary about the Veneto places bound to the life and the music of Sergio Endrico.

==== Talk shows ====
- Match, domande incrociate (Match, crossed questions) – talk-show hosted by Alberto Arbasino, with two adversaries, working in the same field (journalists, directors, writers) but by opposite ideas or divided by a generation gap; the debates are sometimes friendly, other times on the verge of the brawl.
- Proibito (Forbidden) – by Enzo Biagi, who questions his guests about by then thorny matters, as the tax evasion and the eroticism.
- Ping-pong, hosted by Bruno Vespa.

== Ending this year ==
- Carosello
- Il commissario De Vincenzi

== Deaths ==
- 26 April: Sandro Giovannini, 61, author and producers of musical comedies and variety shows together with Pietro Garinei.
- 3 June: Roberto Rossellini, 71, director; in his last years, worked mostly for the television and theorized its didactic function.
