= Sanremo Music Festival 1977 =

Italian song contest (27th edition)

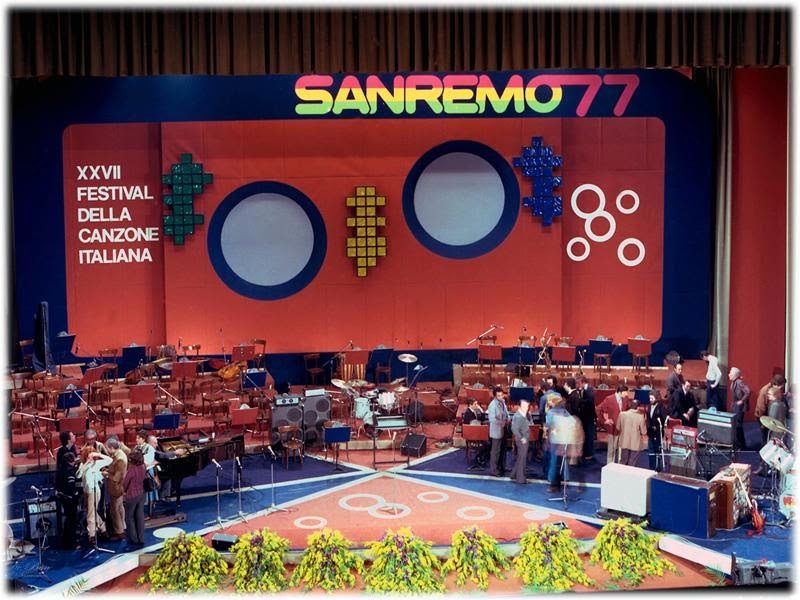

Dates and venue
- First night: 3 March 1977
- Second night: 4 March 1977
- Final night: 5 March 1977
- Venue: Teatro Ariston; Sanremo, Italy

Organisation
- Organiser: Vittorio Salvetti

Production
- Broadcaster: Radiotelevisione italiana (RAI)
- Directors: Adriana Parrella; Antonio Moretti
- Presenters: Maria Giovanna Elmi; Mike Bongiorno (final)

Vote
- Number of entries: 12
- Winner: "Bella da morire" Homo Sapiens

The Sanremo Music Festival 1977 (Italian: Festival di Sanremo 1977), officially the 27th Italian Song Festival (27º Festival della canzone italiana), was the 27th annual Sanremo Music Festival, held at the Teatro Ariston in Sanremo between 3 and 5 March 1977. It was organised by Vittorio Salvetti under sponsorship from the municipality of Sanremo and broadcast by Radiotelevisione italiana (RAI). The first two nights were presented by Maria Giovanna Elmi, who joined Mike Bongiorno in presenting the final.

It was the first edition to take place at the Teatro Ariston instead of the Sanremo Casino, and the format uniquely involved the competing songs eliminated through a series of duels during the final night. The winning song was "Bella da morire" performed by the band Homo Sapiens.

== Format ==
The municipality of Sanremo received seven different proposals to organise the festival's 1977 edition. In January 1977, after narrowing down the list of proposals to two submitted by the festival's former organisers Vittorio Salvetti and Gianni Ravera, the Sanremo municipal council voted in favour of entrusting the event's organisation to Salvetti for the second year in a row, receiving twenty-three votes in comparison to nine for Ravera. As part of the agreement, the municipality provided Salvetti with funding for the venue, while he was given the responsibility of financing the rest of the event's expenses.

The municipality's agreement with Salvetti also included a stipulation he include an orchestra in the event with a minimum of forty members that would accompany the competing songs, as apposed to having artists perform solely to a backing track like the previous year.

The festival's usual venue, the ballroom of the Sanremo Casino, underwent renovations starting in 1976 that prevented it from hosting the event in 1977. Therefore the Teatro Ariston was chosen as the venue for the first time in the festival's history. In comparison to the casino, the theatre was able to house around two thousand seats and featured less expensive ticket prices. Although intended to be temporary, the theatre would go on to serve as the festival's permanent venue in subsequent years. The stage was designed by Milos Anelli Monti.

In a change from previous years, the festival's first two nights did not function to eliminate any of the competing songs. Instead, the first two nights were titled Sanremo Incontro and featured the competing artists performing songs from their repertoire alongside their entry for the festival, without being subject to a vote. The artists were divided equally between the two nights and given a fifteen-minute time slot to perform during the show, also free to be introduced on stage by a guest of their choice.

=== Voting ===
The final night contained a series of competitions across three rounds to select a winning song. For the first round, the twelve artists were divided into six duels, randomly drawn before the final in accordance with record companies, and performed consecutively with both artists positioned on a side of the stage. A jury with twenty-five members, consisting of sixteen randomly drawn audience members and nine randomly drawn telephone subscribers, were situated under the stage and watched the performances via television monitors, voting immediately after each pair of artists performed. Jurors indicated their preference for one of the songs by pressing a button that illuminated a box on a scoreboard above the stage on the side of their preferred artist. The song that garnered the most votes in each duel advanced to a semi-final, where the six remaining songs were divided into new duels and shortened versions of the songs were performed. The three duel winners from the semi-final advanced to a final, also containing shortened performances, in which the jury voted to decide the winning song.

For the first time, the festival concluded with a concert tour titled Sanremo in tournée, which consisted of the competing artists performing their entries in various Italian cities throughout March. The tour was presented as a chance for the public to determine their own ranking of the songs, with a vote taking place in each city. After the tour's conclusion, the results were added together and the final ranking was announced during a show held in April.

== Competing entries ==
The festival's organiser, Vittorio Salvetti, chose artists for the competition in collaboration with record companies, specifically selecting artists that were established, but had yet to have major success, labeling them as "big artists of tomorrow". As specified by the regulations, only twelve entries were selected, which makes the edition hold the record for the fewest competing songs in the festival's history. The participating artists and their songs were announced on 16 February.

Competing entries
Song	Artist	Songwriter(s)	Conductor
"Bella da morire"	Homo Sapiens	Renato Pareti; Alberto Salerno	Ezio Leoni
"Carmela"	Donatella Rettore	Claudio Rego; Donatella Rettore	Natale Massara
"Con te ci sto"	Umberto Napolitano	Umberto Napolitano	Massimo Salerno
"Dedicato a te"	Santino Rocchetti	Santino Rocchetti; Andrea Lo Vecchio	Rodolfo Grieco
"E invece con te…"	Daniela Davoli	Andrea Zarrillo; Daniela Davoli	Marcello Faneschi
"Gran Premio"	Albatros	Salvatore Cutugno; Michelle Vasseur; Vito Pallavicini	Victor Bach
"Io ti porterei"	Leano Morelli	Leano Morelli	Pinuccio Pirazzoli
"Ma perché?"	Matia Bazar	Carlo Marrale; Piero Cassano; Salvatore Stellita	No conductor
"Miele"	Il Giardino dei Semplici	Giancarlo Bigazzi; Gaetano Savio	Renato Angiolini
"Monica"	I Santo California	Giacomo Simonelli; Angela Bini; Paolo Pinna	Giacomo Simonelli
"Tesoro mio"	La Strana Società	Corrado Conti; Franco Cassano; Luigi Albertelli	Alberto Baldan Bembo
"Tu mi rubi l'anima"	Collage	Gabriella Padovan; Antonello De Sanctis	Marcello Faneschi

== Shows ==
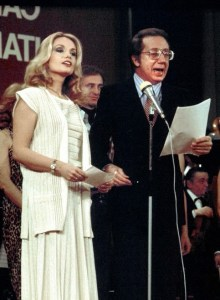
The festival's presenters, Maria Giovanna Elmi and Mike Bongiorno

The festival consisted of three shows held between 3 and 5 March 1977. The first two nights were broadcast only on radio and presented by Maria Giovanna Elmi, who assisted Mike Bongiorno in presenting the final night. The radio director for the shows was Adriana Parrella, while the television director was Antonio Moretti. The song "Theme from King Kong (Pt. II)" recorded by The Love Unlimited Orchestra was used as the festival's opening theme. Rehearsals began in Milan on 28 February at a recording studio and moved to the Teatro Ariston on 2 March.

After the broadcast portion of the first two nights, guest artists performed on stage and were recorded as part of television specials intended to be aired at a later date, with Chocolat's, Daniel Sentacruz Ensemble and Asha Puthli performing during the first night, and Rick Dees, Wess Machine and John Miles, performing an extended set of songs from his album "Stranger in the City", during the second night.

A gala dedicated to celebrating the centenary of Thomas Edison's invention of the phonograph was held at the Teatro Ariston on 6 March, organised as a collateral event to the festival by Vittorio Salvetti. It was hosted by the actor Alberto Lupo and featured performances from both Italian and international artists, including Gigliola Cinquetti, Roberto Murolo, Nicolai Ghiaurov, Roberto Cappello, Paco de Lucía, Gianni Basso, Chet Baker, Domenico Modugno and Barry White, who performed an extended 40-minute set, in addition to the festival's winners, Homo Sapiens performing their winning song. The event was recorded to be aired on television in different countries, with RAI broadcasting it on 30 June.

=== First night ===
The first night was held on 3 March 1977. The first set of six artists performed their entries alongside other songs from their repertoire. The guests that introduced the artists were the impressionist Franco Rosi for La Strana Società, the actress Marina Fabbri for Santino Rocchetti, the singer Loretta Goggi for Il Giardino dei Semplici, the actor Duilio Del Prete for Donatella Rettore, the singer Franco Simone for the Homo Sapiens and the two groups Paco Andorra and Pennsylvania for I Santo California.

First night – 3 March 1977
R/O	Song	Artist
1	"Tesoro mio"	La Strana Società
2	"Dedicato a te"	Santino Rocchetti
3	"Miele"	Il Giardino dei Semplici
4	"Carmela"	Donatella Rettore
5	"Bella da morire"	Homo Sapiens
6	"Monica"	I Santo California

=== Second night ===
The second night was held on 4 March 1977. The second set of six artists performed their entries alongside other songs from their repertoire. Only one of the artists opted to be introduced by a guest, Albatros, who chose Tony Martucci.

Second night – 4 March 1977
R/O	Song	Artist
1	"Con te ci sto"	Umberto Napolitano
2	"Gran Premio"	Albatros
3	"E invece con te…"	Daniela Davoli
4	"Tu mi rubi l'anima"	Collage
5	"Io ti porterei"	Leano Morelli
6	"Ma perché?"	Matia Bazar

=== Final night ===
The final night was held on 5 March 1977. The twelve competing songs were performed again, divided into six duels, with six songs qualifying to the semi-final. The semi-final was divided into three duels, with three songs further qualifying to the final where a winner was chosen. During the show, technical issues occurred with the mechanism used by jury members to display their votes on the scoreboard, causing the results for the first four duels to total 24 points and the fifth duel to total 26 points.

Guest appearances during the show included Domenico Modugno performing his song "Il vecchietto", Love Unlimited performing their song "I Did It for Love", Barry White performing his song "I'm Qualified to Satisfy You", Wess and Dori Ghezzi performing their song "Amore bellissimo", Iva Zanicchi performing her song "Arrivederci padre", Rick Dees performing his songs "Disco Duck" and "Dis-Gorilla", John Miles performing his song "Remember Yesterday", Daniel Sentacruz Ensemble performing their song "Allah, Allah", Marcella performing her song "Abbracciati" and Chocolat's performing their song "King of Clubs".

The winning song was "Bella da morire" written by Renato Pareti and Alberto Salerno, performed by the band Homo Sapiens.

Qualified for the semi-final

First round – 5 March 1977
Duel	R/O	Song	Artist	Points	Place
I	1	"Tesoro mio"	La Strana Società	8	2
I	2	"Io ti porterei"	Leano Morelli	16	1
II	3	"Bella da morire"	Homo Sapiens	13	1
II	4	"E invece con te…"	Daniela Davoli	11	2
III	5	"Ma perché?"	Matia Bazar	10	2
III	6	"Miele"	Il Giardino dei Semplici	14	1
IV	7	"Con te ci sto"	Umberto Napolitano	8	2
IV	8	"Monica"	I Santo California	16	1
V	9	"Gran Premio"	Albatros	18	1
V	10	"Carmela"	Donatella Rettore	8	2
VI	11	"Dedicato a te"	Santino Rocchetti	6	2
VI	12	"Tu mi rubi l'anima"	Collage	19	1

Qualified for the final

Semi-final – 5 March 1977
Duel	R/O	Song	Artist	Points	Place
I	1	"Tu mi rubi l'anima"	Collage	14	1
I	2	"Miele"	Il Giardino dei Semplici	11	2
II	3	"Gran Premio"	Albatros	4	2
II	4	"Monica"	I Santo California	21	1
III	5	"Io ti porterei"	Leano Morelli	8	2
III	6	"Bella da morire"	Homo Sapiens	17	1

Winner

Final – 5 March 1977
R/O	Song	Artist	Points	Place
1	"Tu mi rubi l'anima"	Collage	7	2
2	"Monica"	I Santo California	1	3
3	"Bella da morire"	Homo Sapiens	17	1

== Other awards ==
=== Sanremo in tournée ===
The concert tour Sanremo in tournée was held after the festival between 9 and 31 March 1977 in the Italian cities of Ferrara, Bologna, Modena, Ravenna, Ancona, Mantua, Parma, Padua, Modena, Florence, Magliano Alpi, Pistoia and Teramo.

Votes between the festival's competing songs were held in cities throughout the tour and added together to form a new ranking, announced during a show held in the opera house of the Sanremo Casino on 6 April titled Il festival un mese dopo. The winning song was "Ma perché?" written and performed by the band Matia Bazar, while the festival's winners, Homo Sapiens, finished in fourth place.

Results of Sanremo in tournée
Song	Artist	Place
"Ma perché?"	Matia Bazar	1
"Tu mi rubi l'anima"	Collage	2
"Miele"	Il Giardino dei Semplici	3
"Bella da morire"	Homo Sapiens	4
"Dedicato a te"	Santino Rocchetti	5
"Io ti porterei"	Leano Morelli	6
"Con te ci sto"	Umberto Napolitano	7
"Carmela"	Donatella Rettore	8
"Gran Premio"	Albatros	9
"Tesoro mio"	La Strana Società	10
"E invece con te…"	Daniela Davoli	11
"Monica"	I Santo California	12

== Broadcasts ==
=== Local broadcast ===
The first two nights were broadcast on Rai Radio 1 beginning at 21:05 CET. The final was broadcast on both Rete Uno and Rai Radio 1 beginning at 20:40 CET. A complementary radio commentary track for the television broadcast of the final was provided by actress Adriana Asti and philosopher Umberto Eco, broadcast on Rai Radio 3. Although RAI had produced the festival in colour since the 1973 edition, this was the first edition broadcast in colour on Rete Uno. The final was broadcast on television in Italy to an estimated 16.4 million viewers.

=== International broadcasts ===
The final was broadcast abroad via the Eurovision and Intervision networks. It was reportedly broadcast in over twenty countries, including the Soviet Union, Spain, the Netherlands, Turkey, Tunisia, Lebanon, Libya, and Czechoslovakia. Known details on the broadcasts in each country, including the specific broadcasting stations and commentators are shown in the tables below.

International broadcasters of the Sanremo Music Festival 1977
Country	Broadcaster	Channel(s)	Commentator(s)	Ref(s)
Chile	UCTV	Canal 13 (Note: Delayed broadcast on 27 March at 21:30 (CST))		
Greece	EIRT	EIRT		
