= Tom Mandrake =

American comic artist (born 1956)

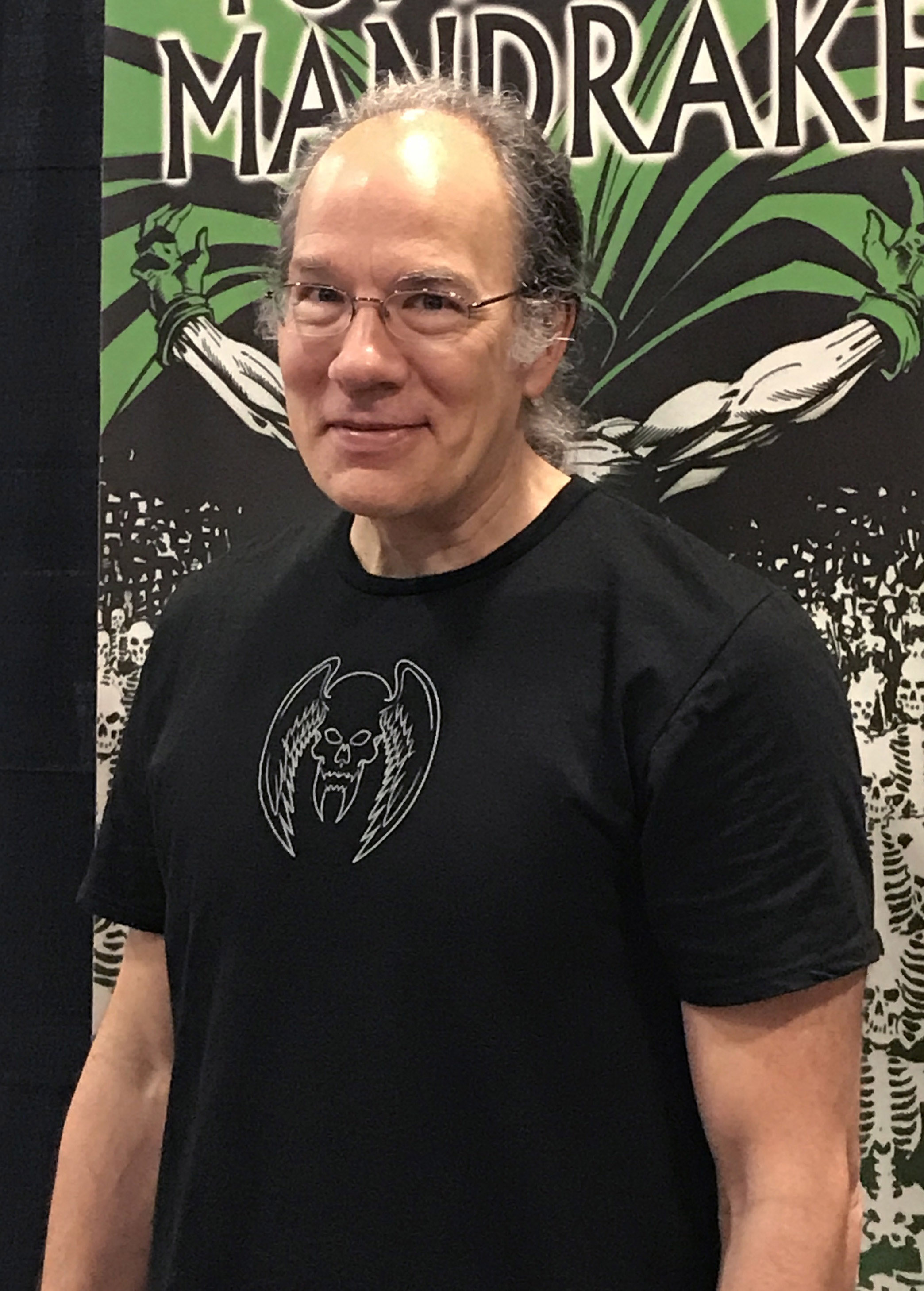
- Mandrake at the 2017 East Coast Comicon
- Born: May 26, 1956 (age 70)
- Areas: Writer, Penciller, Inker
- Notable works: Grimjack; The Spectre; Martian Manhunter
- Awards: Don Thompson Award, 1992, 1993
- Spouse: Jan Duursema

Tom Mandrake (born 1956) is an American comics artist known for his collaborations with writer John Ostrander on several series, including Grimjack (from First Comics) and Firestorm, The Spectre, and Martian Manhunter from DC Comics.

== Early life ==
Mandrake grew up as a fan of Marvel Comics of the 1960s, as well as painters of the Brandywine School, particularly Maxfield Parrish and Howard Pyle. Together with his friend L.B. Kellogg, he created a fanzine titled First Flight while in high school. Mandrake spent two years at Cleveland's Cooper School of Art, and then two more years at The Kubert School, where he earned his degree.

== Career ==
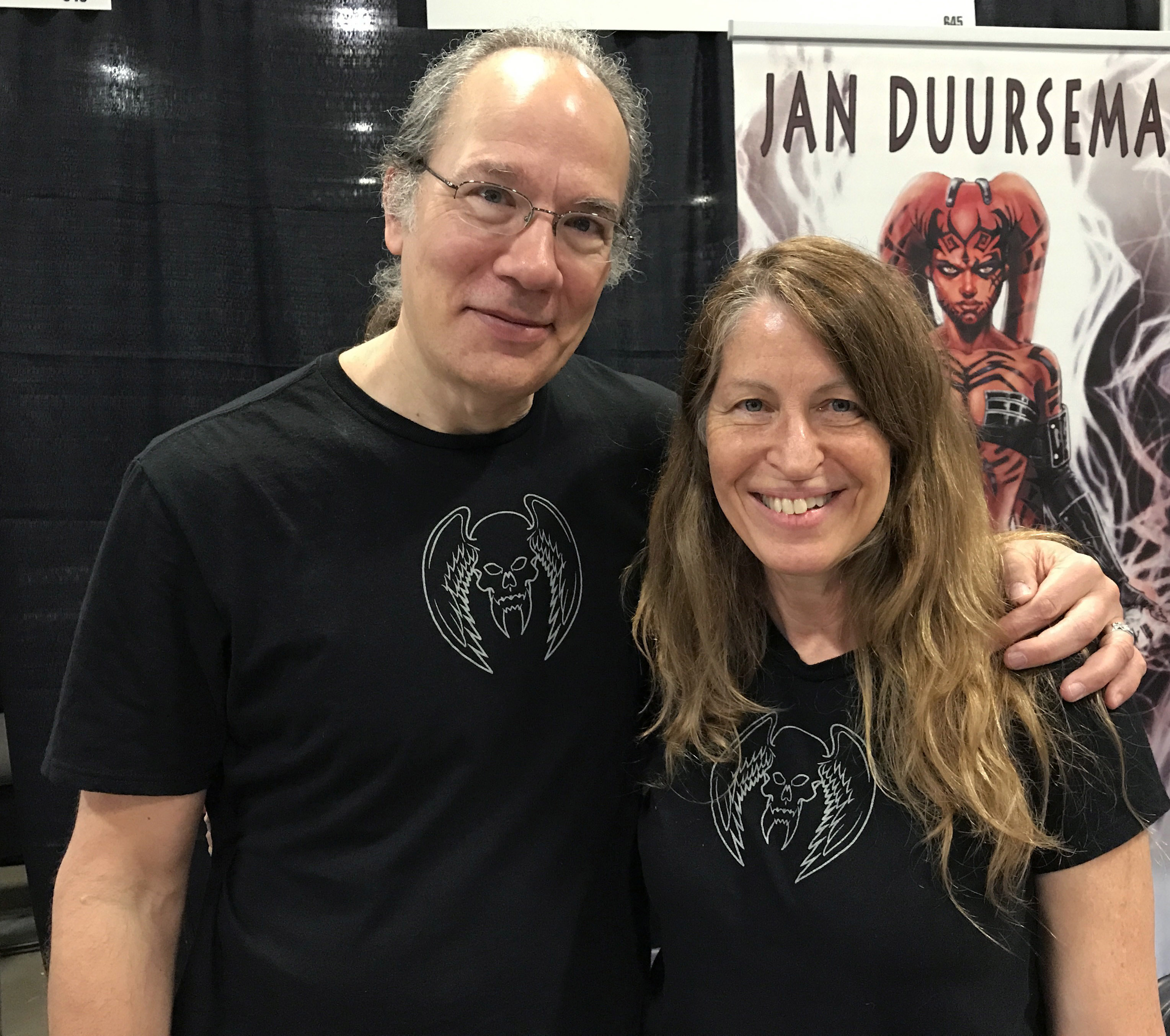
Mandrake with his wife, fellow comics artist Jan Duursema

Mandrake began working for DC Comics where he drew backup stories for the Sgt. Rock title. In a 2001 interview, he recalled "finally landing my first real work, that was a two part story in DC's New Talent Showcase. Once again with my old buddy L.B. at the writers helm on our pirate epic 'Skydogs'." For Marvel Comics, Mandrake provided finished art over layouts by Sal Buscema on the New Mutants title. Back at DC, he and writer Doug Moench created Black Mask in Batman #386 (August 1985) and the Film Freak in Batman #395 (May 1986). Mandrake was one of the contributors to the DC Challenge limited series in 1986 after finishing his run on Batman. In 1992, Mandrake and writer John Ostrander launched The Spectre series at DC Comics. In issue #54 (June 1997), the creative team introduced the character Michael Holt as a new version of Mister Terrific. Following the end of The Spectre series, they moved onto a Martian Manhunter series. In 2001, he worked with writer Dan Mishkin on the short lived series Creeps and in 2006 on the children's book The Forest King: Woodlark's Shadow. In 2007, a story-arc titled "Grotesk" reuniting Ostrander and Mandrake appeared in Batman issues #659-662. An X-Files/30 Days of Night crossover in 2010 was drawn by Mandrake and co-written by 30 Days creator Steve Niles and Adam Jones, the guitarist for the band Tool. Mandrake drew the DC Retroactive: Batman - The '70s one-shot (Sept. 2011) and a revival of Marv Wolfman's Night Force series (May–Nov. 2012). He collaborated with J. Michael Straczynski on the Sidekick series in 2013–2014.

== Awards ==
Mandrake received the Don Thompson Award in 1992 and 1993.

== Personal life ==
Mandrake is married to fellow comic book artist Jan Duursema, whom he met while both were students at The Kubert School. Their wedding was held on the school's grounds. The couple have two children, Jack Moses Mandrake, and Sian Mandrake, who is also a Kubert School-trained comics illustrator.

== Bibliography ==
=== DC Comics ===
- 52 #33 (2007)
- 9-11 - The World's Finest Comic Book Writers & Artists Tell Stories to Remember Volume Two (2002)
- Action Comics Weekly #627–630, 633–634 (Nightwing and Speedy) (full art); #631–632 (inks over Vincent Giarrano) (1988–1989)
- Advanced Dungeons and Dragons #23, 31–32, Annual #1 (full art); Annual #1 (inks over Jan Duursema) (1990–1991)
- Animal Man #39 (1991)
- Arion, Lord of Atlantis #5–13, 33–34 (inks over Jan Duursema) (1983–1985)
- Armageddon: Inferno #1, 4 (1992)
- Batman #386–392, 395–399, 479, 659–662 (full art); #494 (inks over Jim Aparo) (1985–1986, 1992–1993, 2007)
- Batman Confidential #44–48 (2010)
- Batman Villains Secret Files and Origins #1 (1998)
- Batman: Battle for the Cowl: Commissioner Gordon #1 (2009)
- Blackest Night: Tales of the Corps #2 (2009)
- Convergence Suicide Squad #1–2 (2015)
- Countdown #11 (2008)
- Crime Bible: The Five Lessons #1 (2007)
- DC Challenge #12 (1986)
- DC Comics Presents #75, 94 (1984–1986)
- DC Retroactive: Batman – The '70s #1 (2011)
- DCU Heroes Secret Files #1 (1999)
- DCU Villains Secret Files (1999)
- Detective Comics #633, 656, 835–836, Annual #5, 11 (1991–1993, 2007–2009)
- Firestorm, the Nuclear Man #86–100 (1989–1990)
- Fringe #1–6 (2008–2009)
- Ghosts #93, 98 (1980–1981)
- Green Lantern Secret Files #1 (1998)
- Hawkworld #13 (1991)
- Heroes Against Hunger #1 (1986)
- JLA / JSA Secret Files & Origins #1 (2003)
- JLA: Destiny #1–3 (2002)
- JSA #60–62 (2004)
- JSA Secret Files #1 (1999)
- Justice League of America #240 (inks over Mike Sekowsky) (1985)
- The Kents #9–12 (1998)
- Legends of the Dark Knight 100-Page Super Spectacular #1 (2014)
- Legends of the DC Universe 3-D Gallery #1 (1998)
- Lobo Gallery: Portraits of a Bastich #1 (1995)
- Martian Manhunter #1–4, 6–9, 12–20, 22–23, 25–32, #0, #1,000,000 (1998–2001)
- New Talent Showcase #1–2 (1984)
- The New Teen Titans vol. 2 #22 (1986)
- Night Force vol. 3 #1–7 (2012)
- The Saga of Swamp Thing #9 (inks over Jan Duursema) (1983)
- Scooby Apocalypse #26, 28 (full art); #14 (inks over Jan Duursema) (2017–2018)
- Secret Origins #8 (Shadow Lass) (1986)
- Sgt. Rock #349, 352–354, 359, 361–363, 365–366, 369, 371, 376, 378 (1981–1983)
- Shazam!: The New Beginning #1–4 (1987)
- Showcase '95 #8 (1995)
- Spanner's Galaxy #1–6 (1984–1985)
- The Spectre vol. 3 #1–13, 15, 17–19, 21–22, 0, 23, 25, 27–31, 35–44, 46–62 (1992–1998)
- Suicide Squad #56 (inks over Geof Isherwood) (1991)
- Superman and Batman vs. Vampires and Werewolves #1–6 (2008–2009)
- Swamp Thing vol. 2 #50, 77–78, 83–85, 110–111, 114–115 (1986–1992)
- Tales of the Unexpected vol. 2 #6 (2007)
- The Unexpected #213 (1981)
- Unknown Soldier #247 (1981)
- Victorian Undead #4 (inks over Davide Fabbri) (2010)
- Victorian Undead II #1 (inks over Davide Fabbri) (2011)
- The Warlord #62, 123–128 (inks over Jan Duursema) (1982–1988)
- Weird War Tales #104 (1981)
- Who's Who in the DC Universe #2, 10 (1990–1991)
- Who's Who in the DC Universe Update 1993 #1 (1992)
- Who's Who: The Definitive Directory of the DC Universe #5, 8, 12, 14, 17, 19, 21 (1985–1986)
- Who's Who: Update '87 #1, 5 (1987)
- Wonder Woman #300 (inks over Jan Duursema) (1983)
- The X-Files / 30 Days of Night #1–6 (2010–2011)

=== Eclipse Comics ===
- Scout #10 (1986)

=== First Comics ===
- Classics Illustrated #5 (Hamlet) (1990)
- Grimjack #31–54, 75 (1987–1990)

=== Image Comics ===
- The Safest Place (with co-authors Victor Riches and Steven Grant 2008)
- Sidekick #1–6 (2013–2014)

=== Marvel Comics ===
- Call of Duty: The Precinct #1–5 (2002–2003)
- Exiles #33 (2003)
- G.I. Joe: A Real American Hero #143 (1993)
- Ghost Rider/Blaze: Spirits of Vengeance #4 (inks over Adam Kubert) (1992)
- Hulk: Unchained #1–3 (2004)
- The Incredible Hulk Annual #19 (inks over Paul Pelletier) (1993)
- Marvel Holiday Special #4 (Captain America) (1995)
- New Mutants #9–17 (inks over Sal Buscema) (1983–1984)
- The Punisher vol. 6 #24–27 (2003)
- Star Wars #81 (inks over Ron Frenz); #92 (inks over Jan Duursema) (1984–1985)
- Thor vol. 2 #66 (2003)
- Weapon X #23–28 (2004)
- X-Men 2 Movie Prequel: Wolverine #1 (2003)
- X-Men Annual #7 (inks) (1984)
- X-Men Unlimited #1 (2004)

Preceded by Bob McLeod	New Mutants inker 1983–1984	Succeeded by Bill Sienkiewicz
Preceded by Rick Hoberg	Batman artist 1985–1986	Succeeded by various
Preceded by Timothy Truman	Grimjack artist 1987–1989	Succeeded by Flint Henry
Preceded by n/a	Martian Manhunter artist 1998–2001	Succeeded by Eduardo Barreto
