= I Santo California =

Italian musical group

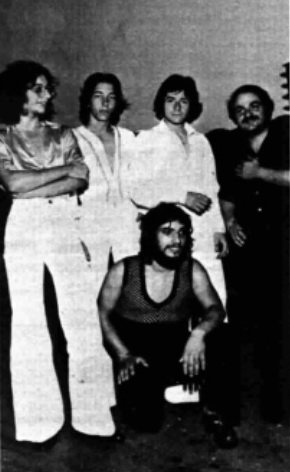
I Santo California, c. 1970

I Santo California are an Italian musical group active since 1974. They are best known for their debut single "Tornerò" which became an international no. one hit in 1975.

== History ==
The group was founded by five musicians originating from Campania, Southern Italy. Originally called La Nuova Frontiera, the band initially performed in clubs and beach resorts in the Amalfi Coast. In 1974, during a concert in Nocera Inferiore, they caught the attention of Elio Palumbo who helped them sign a contract with the Italian label Yep Record in Rome. At that point, the band changed the name to I Santo California.

They released their debut single, "Tornerò", at the end of 1974. A sentimental love ballad, "Tornerò" was a major hit in Italy and Switzerland where it spent several weeks at no. one in 1975. In Switzerland, "Tornerò" became the best-selling single of the year. It also peaked at number five in Germany and Austria. The band's debut album charted within the top twenty in Italy.

The follow-up single, "Un angelo", peaked at no. two in the Italian charts and no. ten in Switzerland in the spring of 1976. The band continued the international success with "Dolce amore mio" which reached no. six in Italy and no. three in Switzerland. In 1977, I Santo California took part to the Sanremo Music Festival with the song "Monica", finishing third. The song quickly turned into another international hit for the band. In 1978, they scored their last top ten hit in Italy with "Manuela, amore!". After that, I Santo California's popularity decreased. The band continued to record and perform but struggled to maintain the same degree of commercial success.

Following a break of fourteen years, in 1994 the band released a new album 1994 Per un mondo migliore.

== Members ==
- Pietro Paolo Barbella - vocals, keyboard (1974 – present)
- Donato Farina - drums (1974 – present)
- Domenico "Mimmo" Aiello - bass (1974 – present)
- Ninni Gibboni - chitarre

Former members

- Massimo Caso - guitar (1974 – 1979)
- Gianni Galizia - chitarre, keyboard (1974 – 1990)

== Discography ==
=== Albums ===
==== Studio albums ====
Title	Album details	Peak chart positions
Title	Album details	IT
Se davvero mi vuoi bene... Tornerò	Released: 1974; Label: Yep; Formats: LP	19
Un angelo	Released: October 1975; Label: Yep; Formats: LP	22
Venus serenade	Released: 1979; Label: Yep; Formats: LP	—
Ti perdono amore mio	Released: 1980; Label: Yep; Formats: LP	—
1994 Per un mondo migliore	Released: 1994; Label: PBR; Formats: CD	—
"—" denotes releases that did not chart.

==== Compilation albums ====
Title	Album details
Torneró	Released: 1975; Label: Philips, Decca; Formats: LP, MC
Hits in the World	Released: 1976; Label: Yep; Formats: LP
Die großen Erfolge. Grandi successi. Les grands succès	Released: 1976; Label: Ariola; Formats: LP
The Best of I Santo California	Released: 1977; Label: Philips; Formats: LP
Il meglio de I Santo California	Released: 1978; Label: Yep; Formats: LP
Tornerò – The Very Best	Released: 1993; Label: Arcade; Formats: CD
Tornerò – Best Of	Released: 1996; Label: ZYX Music; Formats: CD
The World of I Santo California	Released: 2002; Label: ZYX Music; Formats: CD
Tornerò – I Grandi Successi	Released: 2005; Label: ZYX Music; Formats: CD
The Best of I Santo California	Released: 2007; Label: Trecolori Media; Formats: CD

=== Singles ===
Title	Year	Peak chart positions					
Title	Year	IT	AUT	BE (FL)	GER	SPA	SWI
"Tornerò"	1974	2	4	4	2	3	1
"Un angelo"	1974	4	—	—	—	—	9
"Dolce amore mio"	1976	6	—	—	—	—	3
"Ave Maria... No! No!"	1976	9	—	—	—	—	11
"Fenesta vascia"	1977	—	—	—	—	—	—
"Monica"	1977	14	—	—	—	—	9
"Gabbiano"	1977	—	—	—	—	—	—
"Manuela, amore!"	1978	—	—	—	—	—	—
"Venezia"	1979	—	—	—	—	—	—
"Butterfly 2000"	1979	—	—	—	—	—	—
"Ti perdono amore mio"	1980	—	—	—	—	—	—
"Aspettandoti"	1981	—	—	—	—	—	—
"Questa melodia"	1982	—	—	—	—	—	—
"Amore fragile"	1982	—	—	—	—	—	—
"Lassù"	1983	—	—	—	—	—	—
"Maledetto cuore"	1984	—	—	—	—	—	—
"Caro compagno Joe" (Belgium-only release)	1991	—	—	—	—	—	—
"Tornerò 2007" (Clamore Project vs. I Santo California; Germany-only release)	2007	—	—	—	—	—	—
"—" denotes releases that did not chart or were not released in that territory.
