= List of 30 Days of Night comics =

The 30 Days of Night franchise includes the following comics.

== Main series ==
=== 30 Days of Night ===
This was a three-issue miniseries that jump-started the careers of writer Steve Niles and artist Ben Templesmith. Vampires flock to Barrow, Alaska, where the sun sets for about 30 days, allowing them to feed without the burden of sleep to avoid lethal sunlight. When the vampire elder Vicente learns of this plan, he travels to Barrow to end the feeding, in order to preserve the secrecy of vampires. Because of the cold, the vampires' senses are weakened and a few of the town's residents are able to hide. One such resident is Sheriff Eben Olemaun, who saves the town by injecting vampire blood into his veins. He uses his enhanced strength to fight Vicente, saving the lives of the few remaining townspeople, including his wife Stella. Suffering the same weakness as all vampires, Eben dies and turns to ash when the sun rises.

=== Dark Days ===
This was the follow-up to 30 Days of Night, featuring the original creative team. Beginning in June 2003, this series featured the exploits of Stella Olemaun after surviving the attack on Barrow in the original series. After publishing an account of the attack (30 Days of Night), Stella attempts to spread the word of what happened by giving lectures to audiences. Even when she fights off a vampire attack at one lecture, her stories are not believed as her publisher lists her book as fiction. Stella draws the attention of the Los Angeles vampire population, as well as the lover of Vicente, the head vampire from the original series. Learning that there may be a way to bring back her former husband Eben, Stella strikes a deal with vampire Dane, who seeks revenge for the murder of his mentor by Vicente. The two form a brief romantic relationship. Stella exchanges proof of the existence of vampires for her husband's remains, in the hope of bringing him back from the dead. She double-crosses the vampire party, blowing up a large number of them in a house, before successfully resurrecting Eben. The two reconcile for a moment before the still-vampiric Eben lunges, fangs bared, for her throat.

This series also serves as an introduction to the vampiric FBI agent, Norris.

=== Annual 2004 ===
A 48-page one-shot released in January 2004 by regular 30 Days of Night publisher IDW. The issue features four short stories, each written by Steve Niles, but featuring different illustrators.

- "The Book Club", illustrated by co-creator and original 30 Days of Night artist Ben Templesmith. It involves a suburban book club's discussion of Stella Olemaun's book (also titled 30 Days of Night). This arouses suspicion about a shut-in neighbor, leading to his murder by the unruly book club.
- "The Hand That Feeds", illustrated by Szymon Kudranski. It features Dane seeking a hand transplant from an eccentric doctor.
- "Agent Norris: MIA", pencilled by Brandon Hovet. It depicts agent Norris's transformation from a "scout" or "bug eater" to a full-blown vampire.
- "The Trapper", illustrated by Josh Medors. This story introduces John Ikos, a Barrow resident turned vampire hunter (and a main character in later series).

=== 30 Days of Night: Return to Barrow ===
Return to Barrow is another sequel to the original series by Steve Niles and Ben Templesmith. It features Brian Kitka, the brother of a victim of the attack on Barrow in the original miniseries. Kitka becomes Barrow's new sheriff after moving there with his son to investigate his brother's demise. Kitka's skepticism about the claims of a vampire attack disappears when he discovers his deceased brother's journal, which includes a full account of the attack. He finds himself protecting the town along with John Ikos. This story features the return of several characters from the previous series, including Eben and Stella who save Brian's son from the vampires.

=== 30 Days of Night: Bloodsucker Tales ===
Bloodsucker Tales marked the first time a writer other than Niles would work on the series. Throughout its 8 issues, two stories were told.

- "Dead Billy Dead", written by Steve Niles and illustrated by Kody Chamberlain. This serialized story featured a young man named Billy who was turned into a vampire and later kidnapped, along with his girlfriend Maggie, by a vampire-obsessed scientist. Meanwhile, Goodis, a police officer whom Maggie had called when approached by the vampiric Billy, discovers Stella Olemaun's book.
- "Juarez or Lex Nova and the Case of the 400 Dead Mexican Girls", written by Matt Fraction and illustrated by Ben Templesmith. This story depicted Lex Nova's investigation of the disappearance of hundreds of girls in Juarez, Mexico. A group of vampires called the Zero Family Circus arrives in Mexico at the same time, believing the deaths to be caused by an estranged vampire.

=== Annual 2005 ===
A 48-page one-shot titled "The Journal of John Ikos" released in December 2005 by IDW. It tells the story of John Ikos leaving Barrow and going to Los Angeles in search of Agent Norris. While in Los Angeles, John Ikos meets Billy (from the "Dead Billy Dead" story in Bloodsucker Tales) and Dane, and does battle with a gang of vampires going by the name The Night Crew led by a vampire called Santana. Written by Steve Niles and illustrated by Nat Jones.

=== 30 Days of Night: Dead Space ===
After a self-imposed hiatus following the tragic events of the last shuttle mission, NASA prepares to launch the Icarus on a simple mission to help restore the nation's confidence in the space program. But their worst fears are realized when it is discovered that something has gotten aboard the shuttle, something ferocious, something with fangs and a taste for blood. Written by Steve Niles and Dan Wickline, it was drawn by Milx.

=== 30 Days of Night: Spreading the Disease ===
This new series picks up with Agent Michael Henson from the Dead Space series being sent off to exile in Alabama after trying to get people to take the vampire threat seriously. He is contacted by a mysterious caller who suggests the question of "why someone would want to put a vampire in space" still needed to be answered. So Henson takes the time he has before checking in at his new office to try to follow the fangs. This leads him into a much bigger and more dangerous situation. Written by Dan Wickline and illustrated by Alex Sanchez and Tony Sandoval.

=== 30 Days of Night: Eben and Stella ===
In the waning moments of Dark Days, Stella managed to bring her vampire husband Eben back from beyond, only he came back hungry. Afterward, he turned Stella into a vampire, therefore reuniting them. This miniseries fills in the black gaps between that tale and Return to Barrow. It is co-written by Steve Niles and Kelly Sue DeConnick and illustrated by Justin Randall.

=== 30 Days of Night: Red Snow ===
It is 1941 and Hitler's Operation Silver Fox has failed, but the war on the Eastern Front drags on as the Russian winter starts to bite. British military attaché Corporal Charlie Keating observes the war from the Soviet side, making sure crucial supplies get through to aid Stalin's front in the battle against the Nazis. With luck, he too will survive to see the end of the war. But something else is out there, and they are not the Nazis. No matter how hard humanity tries to kill itself, something else does it better. Written and illustrated by Ben Templesmith.

=== 30 Days of Night: Beyond Barrow ===
After years of attacks and then several without, the citizens of Barrow have become united against random attacks on their city by the undead. Unfortunately, the same does not apply outside of Barrow or the rest of the mysterious Arctic Circle. Written by Steve Niles and illustrated by Bill Sienkiewicz.

=== 30 Days of Night: 30 Days 'Til Death ===
The events of Barrow have rippled throughout the world, causing a death squad of elders to "thin the herd" of America's troublesome new breed. Trying not to be found, Rufus attempts to hide by getting a dog, and a girlfriend, pretending to like his neighbors, and going to extreme lengths to hide his insatiable craving for blood. Written and illustrated by David Lapham.

=== 30 Days of Night: Night, Again ===
Fleeing the site of a secondary vampire infestation in the cold wilds of Alaska, a band of survivors arrive at a climate change facility during the final days of a long period of extended daylight. The inhabitants of the research compound are trying to determine the nature of a strange object found in the ice when the survivors arrive, leading to a frightening and bloody confrontation between humans and vampires and an odd and unexpected guest. Written by Joe R. Lansdale and drawn by Sam Kieth.

=== 30 Days of Night, Vol. 1: The Beginning of the End (#1-4) ===
For an all-new 30 Days of Night series, fright-master Steve Niles returns to the invention that launched his career, with art by warped genius Sam Kieth. For the first time, a brand-new cast of characters is introduced to the universe of 30 Days of Night! The reverberations of a vicious vampire attack on Barrow, Alaska, may still be felt as far away as sunny Los Angeles, where a curious lady known as Alice Blood strives to locate confirmation of vampire existence.

=== 30 Days of Night, Vol. 2: Blood-Stained Looking Glass (#5-8) ===
As the sun sets over a small Alaskan village, never to rise again for a month, a new evil emerges from the shadows to frighten the residents... However, after a succession of bizarre occurrences and gruesome murders, the question becomes: what lurks in the shadows? 30 Days of Night is back in an all-new reworking that will titillate the imagination while terrifying the senses!

=== 30 Days of Night, Vol. 3: Run, Alice, Run (#9-12) ===
To conclude the series all must embrace who and what they are as a war between the living and the undead has begun. Armies are being raised and targets being set. All that stands between life and chaos are a handful of Federal agents.

=== 30 Days of Night: Falling Sun (#1-3) ===
A revival and return to Barrow story written by Rodney Barnes and designed by Chris Shehan with story consultation done by Steve Niles. The town of Barrow, Alaska, has survived vampires before. But over two decades after the first terrifying vampire attack, when the long polar night falls, it's no longer just vampires stalking the darkness for revenge…and no one is safe in this horror graphic novel.

=== 30 Days of Night ===
2017 6-issue reimagining of the series.

== Other ==
=== 30 Days of Night: Film Tie-In ===
This is a novelization of the film based on the comic series. This release closely follows the story as it is told in the film.

=== The X-Files/30 Days of Night ===
In July 2010, Wildstorm and IDW published issue #1 of The X-Files/30 Days of Night to positive reviews. The six-issue limited series is written by 30 Days of Night creator Steve Niles and Tool guitarist Adam Jones and drawn by Tom Mandrake. The story follows Mulder and Scully to Alaska to investigate a series of grisly murders that may be linked to vampires.

=== Infestation 2: 30 Days of Night #1 ===
As part of the 2012 IDW crossover event Infestation 2, IDW published a one-shot which featured a story where the Great Old Ones invaded the universe of the 30 Days of Night. It was written by Duane Swierczynski and illustrated by Stuart Sayger. The one-shot came out in April, 2012.

=== Criminal Macabre: Final Night - The 30 Days of Night Crossover ===
Cal McDonald only wanted a beer, but what he got was a jaded federal agent and a story about vampires up in Barrow, Alaska. There's a new vamp in LA, and he's hell bent on escalating his attacks. When Mo'Lock's sometimes ghoul-friend is murdered, Cal's on the hunt . . . for Eben—the longtime protagonist/antagonist of 30 Days of Night.
