= Alien vs. Predator: Sand Trap =

Comic book series

Publication information
- Publisher: Dark Horse Comics
- Schedule: Monthly
- Format: Limited series
- Genre: Science fiction
- Publication date: November 27, 2007
- No. of issues: 1

Creative team
- Written by: Mike Kennedy
- Artist(s): Davide Fabbri

Alien vs. Predator: Sand Trap is a comic book series by Mike Kennedy. It was released as a one-shot comic issue published by Dark Horse Comics, on November 27, 2007. This series was included on the Alien vs. Predator: The Ultimate Showdown DVD box set.

== Description ==
An unfortunate desert platoon gets more war than they bargained for when they unwittingly end up in the middle of a battle where the warriors are not human. The soldiers soon discover that this chaotic region has proven to be an ideal hunting ground for the Predators' latest conquest, and even Blackwater was no match for the forces unleashed in the thrill of the game. Will the new squad fare any better than the band of brothers before them? In space, nobody can hear you scream. On Earth, it won't matter.
