= Anna-Maria Zimmermann =

German singer

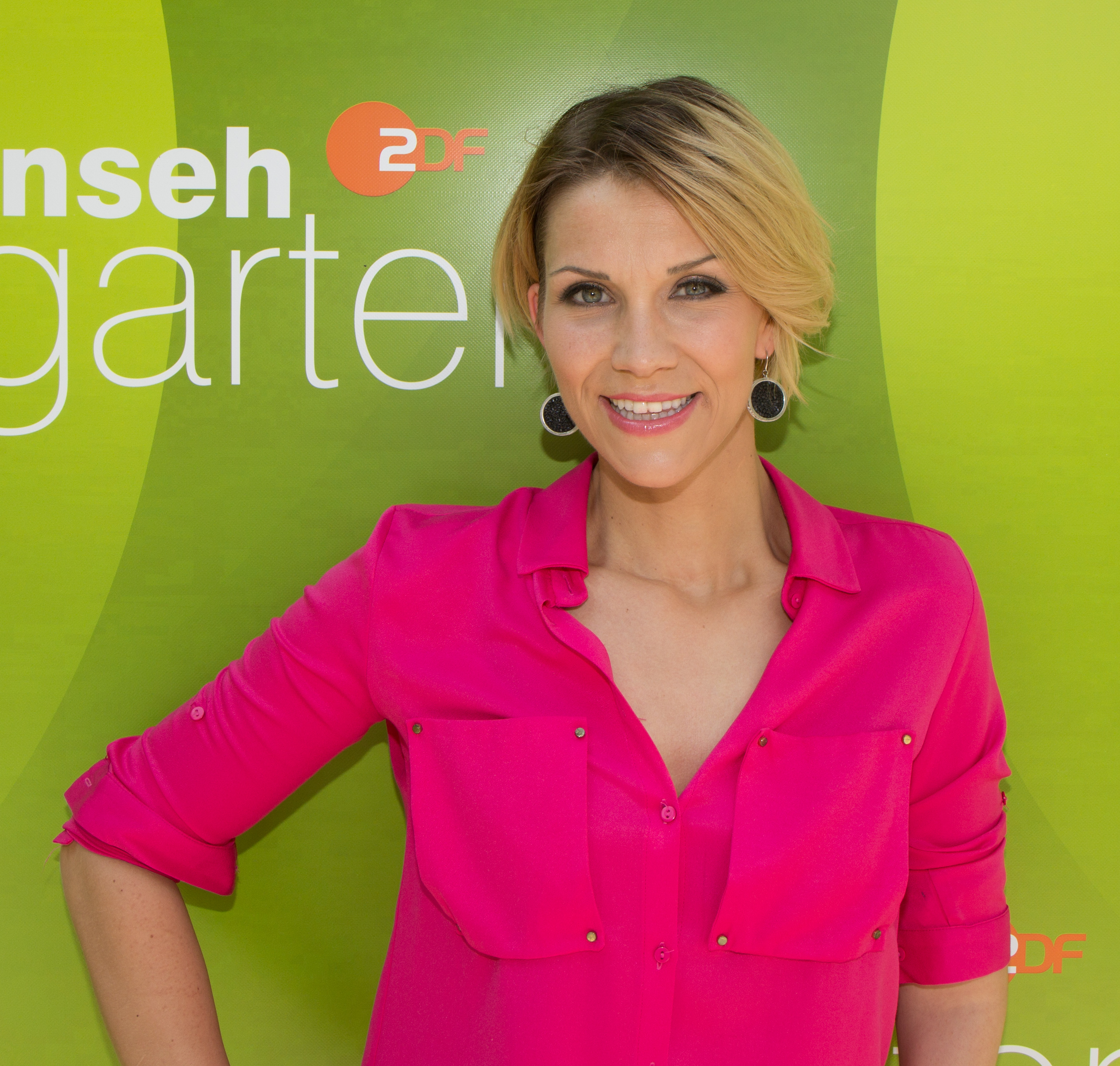
Zimmermann in 2018

Anna-Maria Zimmermann (born 14 December 1988 in Gütersloh, North Rhine-Westphalia) is a German singer and a Deutschland sucht den Superstar participant in 2006. Zimmermann was injured in a helicopter accident when a Robinson R44 type helicopter crashed into the ground on 24 October 2010.

== Discography ==
=== Albums ===
- 2010: Einfach Anna!
- 2012: Hautnah
- 2013: Sternstunden
- 2015: Bauchgefühl
- 2017: himmelbLAu
- 2018: Sorgenfrei

=== Singles ===
- 2007: "Der erste Kuss" (Jojos feat. Anna-Maria Zimmermann)
- 2008: "Wer ist dieser DJ?"
- 2009: "1000 Träume weit (Tornerò)"
- 2010: "Hurra wir leben noch"
- 2010: "Frei sein"
- 2010: "7 Wolken"
- 2011: "100.000 leuchtende Sterne"
- 2012: "Leben"
- 2012: "Mit dir"
- 2012: "Freundschaftsring" (Duet with Olaf Henning)
- 2013: "Non plus ultra"
- 2014: "Tanz"
- 2014: "Die Tanzfläche brennt"
- 2014: "Nur noch einmal schlafen"
- 2014: "Letzte Weihnacht"
- 2015: "Du hast mir so den Kopf verdreht"
- 2016: "Tinte" (Duet with Achim Petry)
- 2016: "Frohe Weihnacht" (Duet with Achim Petry)
- 2017: "Himmelblaue Augen"
- 2017: "Verheddert"
- 2018: "Scheiß egal"
- 2022: "So vermisst"
- 2024: "Liebelei"
