= Tornerò (I Santo California song) =

1974 song by I Santo California

Single by I Santo California

from the album Se davvero mi vuoi bene... Tornerò
- B-side: "Se davvero mi vuoi bene"
- Released: 1974
- Genre: Pop
- Length: 4:07
- Label: Yep, Philips, Ariola
- Songwriters: Ignazio Polizzy, Claudio Natili, Marcello Ramoino, Elio Palumbo

I Santo California singles chronology
"Tornerò" (1974)	"Un angelo" (1975)

"Tornerò" (Italian for "I Will Return") is a song by the Italian musical group I Santo California, released in 1974 as their debut single. The following year, the down-tempo love ballad became a number-one hit in Italy as well as a top five hit in German speaking countries. In Italy, it spent three consecutive weeks at no. 1 in June and July 1975, and was certified gold. In Switzerland, it remained at the top for 6 consecutive weeks in September and October 1975, and was the best-selling single of the year there. The song has been covered by numerous artists in various languages.

== Track listing ==
- 7" single

A. "Tornerò" – 4:07
B. "Se davvero mi vuoi bene" – 3:25

== Chart performance ==
Chart (1975–76)	Peak position
Austria	4
Belgium (Wallonia)	4
France	44
West Germany	2
Italy	1
Spain	4
Switzerland	1

== "Volveré" ==
"Volveré"

Single by Diego Verdaguer

from the album Volveré
- B-side: "Partiré en Una Vieja Barca"
- Released: 1976
- Length: 3:58
- Label: Music Hall
- Songwriters: Ignazio Polizzy, Claudio Natili, Marcello Ramoino, Elio Palumbo

Diego Verdaguer singles chronology
"Volveré" (1976)	"Yo pescador de amor" (1976)

Music video
- "Volveré" on YouTube

"Volveré" (Spanish for "I Will Return") is the Spanish-language version of the Italian song “Torneró” from the group I Santi California, first sung by Argentine singer, Diego Verdaguer. It was included on the album Volveré (1976). It debuted and peaked at number 5 on Billboard's Latin Digital Song Sales following his death in 2022.

His version was later covered by K-Paz de la Sierra for their album Pensando En Ti (2004). It peaked at number 6 in the same year on Billboard's Hot Latin Tracks chart. The song was nominated for Song of the Year at the 2006 Premio Lo Nuestro Awards.

=== Chart performance ===
Diego Verdaguer version
Chart (2022)	Peak position
Billboard Latin Digital Song Sales	5

K-Paz de la Sierra version
Chart (2004)	Peak position
Billboard Hot Latin Tracks	6

== Other cover versions ==
- In 1975 Michael Holm recorded the song in German as Wart' auf mich (Du, wenn ich dich verlier') (Ariola, 16 225 AT) for his album Wenn ein Mann ein Mädchen liebt (Ariola, 55 606 DT). The song charted at no. 4 in Germany and no. 7 in Switzerland.
- Flemish singer Willy Sommers recorded the single of the song in Dutch as Kom terug text by Jan De Vuyst, (Philips Records, 856 780-2) for the 1995 album Profumo d'amore (Scent of love) (Philips Records, 526 590-2). His version reached no. 30 in Belgium.
- Amanda Lear covered the song as "I'll Miss You" for her 1995 album Alter Ego.
- In 2009, Austrian singer Sandra Stumptner contributed lyrics to a new German-language cover of the song, "1000 Träume weit (Tornerò)". The single, released under the pseudonym Antonia aus Tirol, charted at no. 89 in Germany. She re-recorded the song in duet with Sascha Heyna in 2013.
- Anna-Maria Zimmermann covered Antonia aus Tirol's version of the song reaching no. 68 in Germany in 2009.
