= Davidé Fabbri =

Italian comic book artist

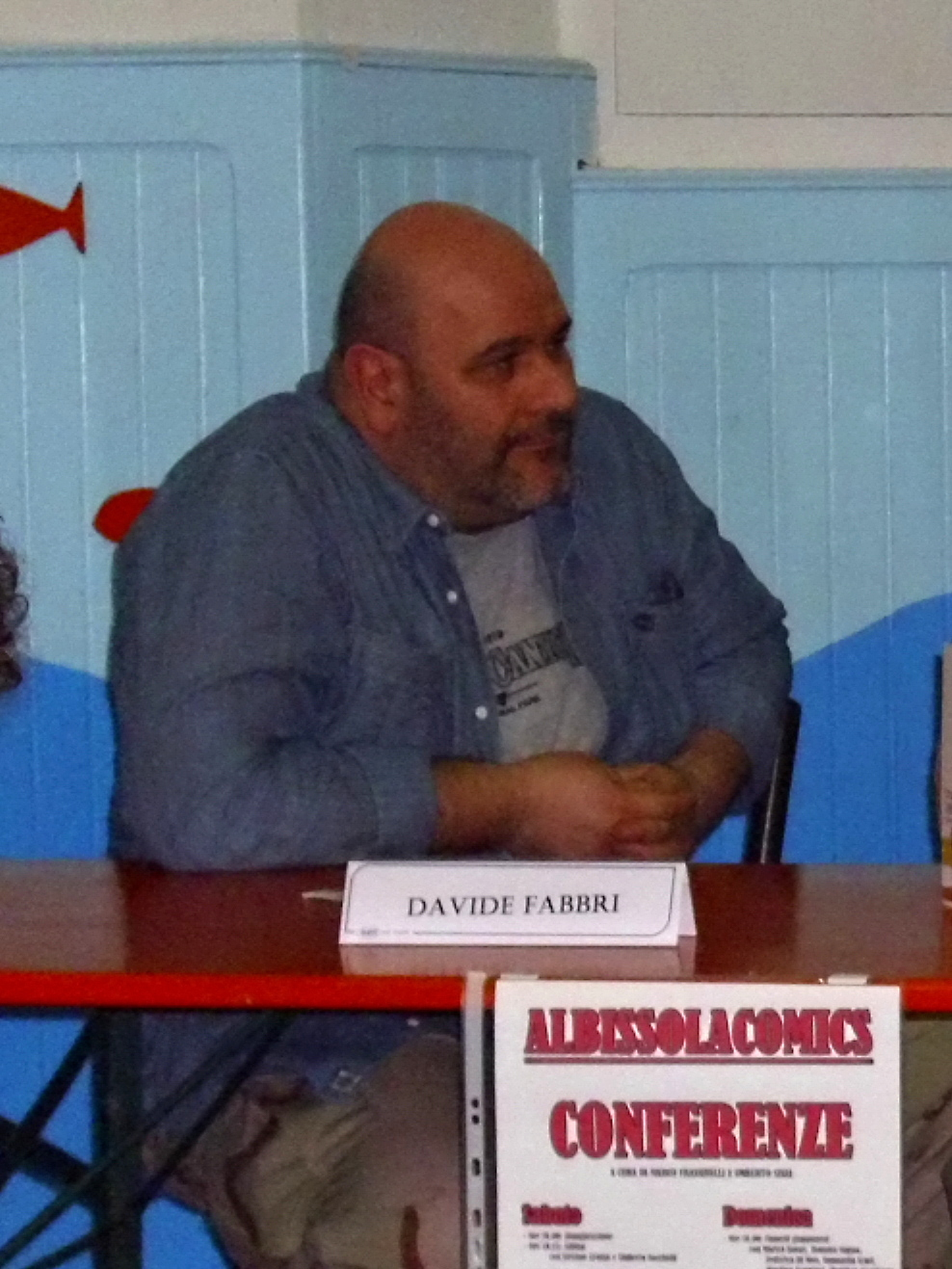
- Davidé Fabbri at Albissola Comics 2014
- Area: Penciller
- Notable works: Victorian Undead, Star Wars and Starship Troopers
- Awards: Nominee for a Rondo Hatton Classic Horror Awards in 2010 (for Victorian Undead)

Davidé Fabbri is an Italian comic book artist. He has worked mainly for Dark Horse Comics on various Star Wars series. He also worked for Dynamite and recently for DC Comics. In 2010, he worked on Victorian Undead, written by Ian Edginton for WildStorm. This series pitted Sherlock Holmes and Dr Watson against a legion of undead zombies. It was nominated for a Rondo Hatton Classic Horror Awards in 2010.

"Being a fan of science fiction, and doing my work almost entirely abroad, I found it enjoyable the idea of returning from Italian readers with a publication of this kind." Davidé Fabbri talking to 'Marcello "Mars" During' about Kepher, an Italian comic series he illustrated all the covers for, published by Star Comics in 2012.

== Published work ==
=== Writer ===
- 9-11: Artists Respond, Volume One (2002)

=== Penciller and Inker ===
- Batman: Arkham Unhinged #15 (for DC Comics) Jun 12 2013 written by Derek Fridolfs and Karen Traviss.
- Operation Overlord #1-4 (2014-2015) #1 written by Michaël Le Galli, #2-4 written by Bruno Falba for Glénat Éditions

=== Penciller ===
- Mutant Chronicles Golgotha #1-4 (1996) Acclaim Comics, written by William King
- Mutant Chronicles Sourcebook (1996), #5 of the above series for Acclaim Comics
- Starship Troopers: Insect Touch #2-3 (1997) with co-writer Warren Ellis with art by Fabbri and Paolo Parente for Dark Horse Comics. Collected in Starship Troopers (1998) ISBN 1-56971-314-6
- Starship Troopers: Dominant Species #1-4 (1998) for Dark Horse Comics, written by Jan Strnad
- Starship Troopers (1998), a collected trade paperback of above ISBN 978-1569713143
- Star Wars Vol 5, 7, 28, 29, 30, 31 and 36-41 (1998) for Dark Horse Comics
- Star Wars (1999) for Dark Horse Comics #36,37,40,42,46 and 47
- Star Wars Sonderband #10 (1999) for Dark Horse Comics, written by Randy Stradley
- Star Wars Tales #5 and #17 (1999) for Dark Horse Comics
- Xena: Warrior Princess Blood and Shadows (1999) for Dark Horse Comics, written by John Wagner with pencils by Fabbri and Mike Deodato. A trade paperback collects Xena #7-10 (2001) ISBN 1-56971-521-1
- Star Wars: Jedi Council: Acts of War #1-4 (2000) for Dark Horse Comics, written by Randy Stradley. Collected into a trade paperback ISBN 978-1840232868
- Planet of the Apes (movie adaptation) (2001) for Dark Horse Comics, written by Scott Allie
- Star Wars: Empire #3-6, 16-18 and 36-40 (2002) for Dark Horse Comics
- Star Wars: Infinities - The Empire Strikes Back #1-4 (2002) for Dark Horse Comics. Collected into a trade paperback ASIN: B00BHM8B7Y
- 9-11 Respond, Volume One (2002)
- Star Wars Omnibus #8,10 and 17 (2006) for Dark Horse Comics
- Alien vs. Predator: Sand Trap (2007) for Dark Horse Comics, written by Mike Kennedy
- Paolo Parente's Dust (2007) for Image Comics #1, with others ISBN 978-1582409535
- Jusqu'au Dernier (Star Wars Rébellion, Vol 1 'Until the Last') (2007) by Delcourt, written by Welles Hartley ISBN 9782756008165
- Brothers in Arms #1-4 (2008) Gearbox Software and Dynamite Entertainment, written by Mike Neumann. Fabbri helped with plotting
- Star Wars: Luke Skywalker: The Last Hope for the Galaxy (2008) for Dark Horse, a trade paperback of various Star Wars comics ISBN 978-1595821515
- Red Faction: Guerrilla Book #1 A Fire on Mars (2009) for Wildstorm Comics, written by Paul De Meo
- Star Wars: Halloween Special 2009 "Planet of the Dead" (2009) for Dark Horse, written by Steve Niles. It reprints Star Wars #17 and was a give-away issue
- Dust Wars #1-3 (2010) for Image Comics, written by Christopher Morrison
- Victorian Undead #1-6 (2010) for WildStorm, written by Ian Edginton. Trade paperback - ISBN 978-1401228408
- Victorian Undead II: Sherlock Holmes vs. Dracula #1-5 (2011) for WildStorm, written by Ian Edginton. Trade paperback - ISBN 978-1401232689
- Aliens: Colonial Marines - No Man Left Behind (2012) for Dark Horse Comics, written by Joshua Williamson. Fabbri and others provided pin-up art to this freebie given away at San Diego Comic-Con 2012
- Free Comic Book Day - Serenity/Star Wars (2012) for Dark Horse Comics, written by Zack Whedon
- Star Wars: Agent of the Empire - Hard Targets (2012) for Dark Horse Comics, written by John Ostrander, Haden Blackman, Jeremy Barlow, Chuck Dixon

=== Inker ===
- Starship Troopers: Insect Touch (1997)
- Starship Troopers (1998)
- Starship Troopers: Dominant Species (1998)
- SpyBoy (1999)
- 9-11 (2002)
- Brothers in Arms (2008)
- Victorian Undead (2010)
- Victorian Undead II (2011)
- Batman: Arkham Unhinged (2011)
- Batman: Arkham Unhinged (2012)
- Star Wars: Agent of the Empire - Hard Targets (2012)

=== Colorist ===
- Starship Troopers: Insect Touch (1997)
- Starship Troopers (1998)
- Star Wars (1999)
- Star Wars: Empire (2002)
- Star Wars: Luke Skywalker: The Last Hope for the Galaxy (2008)

== Cover artist ==
- Star Wars: Jedi Council: Acts of War (2000)
- Alien vs. Predator: Sand Trap (2007)
- Brothers in Arms (2008)
- Kepher (2011) Star Comics (#1-8 written by Roberto Cardinal and Stefano Nocilli)
- Operation Overlord (2014-2015) Glénat Éditions (#1 written by Michaël Le Galli, #2-4 written by Bruno Falba)

== Other work ==
- Provided art for Orzowei graphic novelisation by Alberto Manzi in June 1984.
- Provided art for Asimov's Science Fiction magazine #2 - 18 (1994)
- Provided the Italian cover for The Crack in Space novel by Philip K. Dick in 1995.
- Provided art for the cover of Niccolò Ammaniti's book Fa un po' male (It's a little bad) on 1 June 2004 by Giulio Einaudi ISBN 9788806168155.
- Provided pencilled art for The Lord of the Rings Masterpieces (sketch cards) - Topps (2006)
- Provided pencilled art for Star Wars Heritage sketch cards (2004)
- Provided pencilled art for Star Wars: Clone Wars sketch cards (2004)
- Provided pencilled art for Star Wars: Episode III – Revenge of the Sith sketch cards (2004)
- Provided art for Indiana Jones Masterpieces trading cards - Topps (2008)
