= Orzowei =

First edition (publ. Bompiani)

Orzowei is a 1955 novel by Italian writer Alberto Manzi. It is an anti-racist educational story set in Southern Africa. Adaptations of the novel include a movie (Orzowei, il figlio della savana, 1976) and a popular TV series (1977).

== Plot ==
Isa is a white boy who is abandoned in the jungle somewhere in Southern Africa. He is found and adopted by an old couple of a Swazi tribe. Isa is somewhat isolated in the tribe because of his white skin, and gets nicknamed "Orzowei", "the foundling"; his main antagonist is Mesei, the chief's son. Also because of his white skin, Isa is not accepted in the warrior society, despite successfully completing a painful initiation rite. He ultimately chooses to leave the village, and later joins a tribe of Bushmen. The wise Bushman Pao accepts him in his family and teaches him love and respect for all people, independent of colour. When the Swazi and Bushmen get on a war footing, Pao's teachings help Isa put an end to the conflict, thereby beating his all-time enemy Mesei.

== Adaptation ==
Orzowei
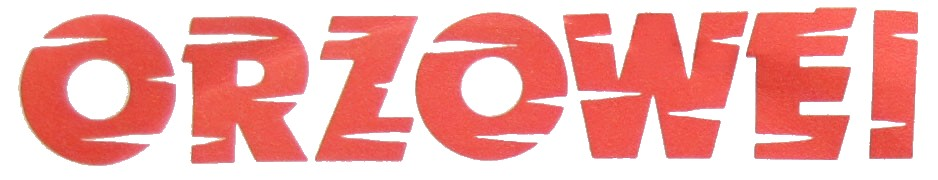
- Also known as: Son of the Savannah
- Based on: Orzowei by Alberto Manzi
- Written by: Alberto Manzi
- Story by: Alberto Manzi
- Directed by: Yves Allégret
- Starring: Peter Marshall; Bonne Lundberg; Stanley Baker; Doris Kunstmann; Vincenzo Crocitti
- Music by: Oliver Onions
- Country of origin: Italy; Germany
- Original languages: Italian; German; English; Spanish

Production
- Running time: 22 minutes

Original release
- Network: Rai 1
- Release: 1976 – 1977

The novel was first adapted as a movie in a 1976 Italian/German production entitled Orzowei, il figlio della savana ("Orzowei, Son of the Savannah"). In 1977, the TV series Orzowei was aired on RAI 1 (Italy's primary national television) featuring Peter Marshall as Orzowei. The TV series was very popular, partly due to a very successful soundtrack by Oliver Onions.

Davide Fabbri provided a drawn cover for an edition of the book published in June 1984.
