= Collage (Italian band) =

Italian pop music group

Collage (also spelled as I Collage) are an Italian pop music group, mainly successful in the 1970s.

== Career ==
The group formed in 1971 in Olbia, Sardinia, as the result of the merging of two previous groups, MAL P2 and The Angels. In 1976 they won the Castrocaro Music Festival with the romantic "Due ragazzi nel sole", which turned to be a hit and peaked at third place on the Italian hit parade.

The following year the group entered the main competition at the Sanremo Music Festival ranking second with the song "Tu mi rubi l'anima", which also charted #2 on the Italian hit parade. Following a series of minor hits, starting from the second half of the 1980s the band mainly devoted themselves to live performances and concerts.

== Members ==
- Tore Fazzi – bass guitar, lead vocalist (1971 – present)
- Piero Fazzi – guitar, voice (1971 – present)
- Masino Usai – drums (1971 – 1990)
- Piero Pischedda – guitar (1971 – 1990)
- Pino Ambrosio – keyboards, voice (1971 – 1990)
- Luciano Degortes – voice (1971 – 1974)
- Mario Chessa – keyboard, violin, voice (1992 – present)
- Francesco Astara – drums (1992 – present)

== Discography ==
Albums

- 1976 – Due ragazzi nel sole
- 1978 – Piano piano m'innamorai di te
- 1979 – Concerto d'amore
- 1980 – Donna musica
- 1982 – Stelle di carta
- 2000 – Settantaseiduemila
- 2003 – Abitudini e no
- 2010 – Non ti dimenticherò
