= Gianni Bisiach =

Italian journalist, writer, and film director (1927–2022)

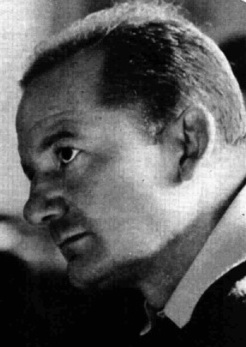
- Bisiach in 1965
- Born: 7 May 1927; Gorizia, Italy
- Died: 20 November 2022 (aged 95); Rome, Italy
- Occupation: Writer

Gianni Bisiach (7 May 1927 – 20 November 2022) was an Italian journalist, television and radio writer, presenter, essayist, documentarist, and screenwriter.

== Biography ==
Born in Gorizia, after getting his degree in Medicine Bisiach enrolled at the Centro Sperimentale di Cinematografia. In the mid-1950s he entered RAI as a collaborator of the news program TV 7. In the late 1970s he started working on radio, where he created the long-standing Radio Uno talk show Radio anch'io, which ran between 1978 and 1992 and had a TV spin-off, also hosted by Bisiach.

In his variegated career Bisiach also directed the documentary film I due Kennedy and a segment of the anthology film I misteri di Roma, and collaborated on some screenplays. He also wrote several books, notably the interview book Pertini racconta in collaboration with Sandro Pertini.

== Death ==
Bisiach died in Rome on 20 November 2022, at the age of 95.
