= Homo Sapiens (band) =

Italian pop rock group

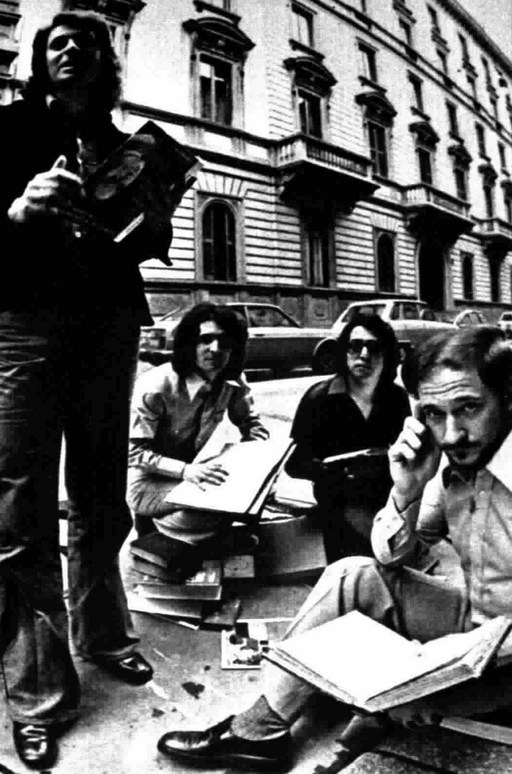
Homo Sapiens in 1975

Homo Sapiens (sometimes spelled as Gli Homo Sapiens) is an Italian pop rock group who were mainly successful in the 1970s.

== History ==
The group formed in the late 1960s as I Tarli. They adopted the current name in 1972, and had their first success in 1975 with the ballad "Tornerai tornerò", which reached the ninth place on the Italian hit parade.

The group won the 1977 Sanremo Music Festival with the song "Bella da morire", which was also a commercial success, peaking at second place on the hit parade. After a further success with the song "Io e te stasera", the group disbanded in the early 1980s, then reunited in 1990.

Bassist Marzio Mazzanti died in February 2026.

== Discography ==
Albums

- 1974 – Homo Sapiens (Ri-Fi, RDZ ST 14238)
- 1975 – Tornerai, tornerò (Ri-Fi, RDZ ST 14258)
- 1976 – Pecos Bill (Ri-Fi, RDZ ST 14269)
- 1977 – Bella da morire (Ri-Fi, RDZ ST 14278)
- 1978 – Due mele (Ri-Fi, RDZ ST 14294)
- 1980 – Homo Sapiens (Harmony)
- 1990 – Presagio di mare (Voltage, CD 57027)
- 1994 – I comandamenti e...altre storie (Duck Record, DGCD 098)
- 1998 – 30 anni in una sera (Doppio)

Awards and achievements
Preceded by Peppino di Capri with "Non lo faccio più"	Sanremo Music Festival; Winner; 1977	Succeeded by Matia Bazar with "E dirsi ciao"
