= Bella da morire =

Single by Homo Sapiens

from the album Bella da morire
- B-side: "Dolce la sera"
- Released: March 1977
- Genre: Pop ballad
- Length: 4:20
- Label: Ri-Fi
- Songwriter(s): Renato Pareti, Alberto Salerno
- Producer(s): Renato Pareti

Homo Sapiens singles chronology
"Io e te stasera" (1976)	"Bella da morire" (1977)	"Due mele" (1978)

Audio
- "Bella da morire" on YouTube

"Bella da morire" ('Drop-dead gorgeous') is a 1977 song written by Renato Pareti and Alberto Salerno and performed by pop-rock band Homo Sapiens. It won the 27th edition of the Sanremo Music Festival and was a major success, becoming the band's signature song.

== Reception ==
The song has been described as "consisting of minimalist pictorial details [...] over a subtle melody, embroidered on a light background of guitars and keyboards that serves to launch [...] a catchy refrain" and as "full of falsettos and unoriginal rhymes, for certain not shining in terms of originality".

== Track listing ==
No.	Title	Length
1.	"Bella da morire"	4:20
2.	"Dolce la sera"	3:54

== Charts ==
Chart	Peak position
Italy (Musica e dischi)	3
