= Chocolat's =

Belgian band

Chocolat's is a Belgian disco-latino group which made 12 albums between 1975 and 1981, and sold more than 6 million records.

Chocolat's was formed in 1975 by Marcel de Keukeleire and Jean Van Loo, both active in the music business in Mouscron, Belgium. Vanloo had first organised concerts featuring artists such as Jimi Hendrix to Mouscron, and De Keukeleire owned a record shop. They launched their label Elver in the early 1970s, and had already released some hitsingles by 1975, including "El Bimbo" by "Les Chocolats Boys".

They changed the name of the group to Chocolat's, and in 1975 their first single and biggest success was Brasilia Carnaval, written by de Keukeleire and sung by Jean-Luc Drion. The album of the same name sold some 5 million copies, while the successor Rythmo Tropical (also from 1975) sold 1.4 million copies.

When the group became successful, Salvatore Acquaviva was engaged as frontman, together with four "Brasilian" dancers. In 1976, they had some success in the United States as well, when King of Clubs reached #13 in the "Billboard National Disco Action Top 40" (the chart was later renamed to Dance Club Songs). Early in 1978, they again entered this chart, now with Baby, let's do it the French way.

Later albums were less successful, but in 1980 the group scored one final hit with La chatte à la voisine, which was already released in 1976 but only in 1980 became the biggest summer hit of the year in France, Italy and Germany.

The group disbanded in 1980, after having created 7 albums.

Some of the group's songs were repopularised during the 1980s by French group La Compagnie Créole.

== Discography ==
=== Albums ===
- 1975: Brasilia Carnaval
- 1975: Rythmo Tropical
- 1976: Kings of Clubs
- 1976: Donne moi un baiser
- 1977: Baby, let's do it the French way
- 1977: The Fabulous Chocolat's
- 1978: African choco

=== Singles and EPs ===
- 1975: Brasilia Carnaval (reached #4 in France, where it charted for 18 weeks in the national top 40)
- 1975: Rythmo Tropical (charted one week in France, at #35)
- 1976: Toca toca mi ré fa (charted one week in France, at #38)
- 1976: La chatte à la voisine
- 1976: King of Clubs
- 1977: Baby, let's do it the French way
- 1979: Senorita por favor
- 1977: Cubanita
