= Daniela Davoli =

Italian singer

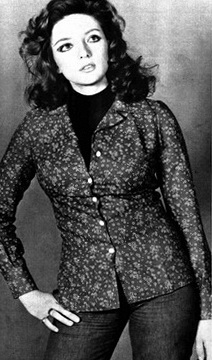
- Daniela Davoli in Radiocorriere magazine, 1975.

Background information
- Born: 5 August 1957 (age 68); Pisa, Italy
- Occupation: Singer-songwriter

Daniela Davoli (born Annamaria Fiorillo, 5 August 1957) is an Italian pop singer-songwriter, mainly successful in the second half of the 1970s.

== Life and career ==
Born in Pisa, after participating to several musical contests Davoli moved to Rome where she was put under contract by the label Aris. She made her record debut in 1974, with the double single "I ragazzi giù nel campo", a song with lyrics by Pier Paolo Pasolini and Dacia Maraini which was used for the Italian soundtrack of the film Sweet Movie.

She got her first hit in 1976, with the song "Due anni fa" which ranked seventh on the Italian hit parade. In 1977, she entered the main competition at Sanremo Music Festival with the song "Invece con te", and the single peaked at number 11 on the Italian hit parade. The same year Davoli participated at the World Popular Song Festival in Tokyo with the song "Confessioni", not reaching the finals, and had another top ten hit with the single "Se fossi come lei".

In 1979, Davoli debuted as a fotoromanzi actress for the magazines Lancio and Kiss. In 1980, she released her last single, "Incertezza d'amore"; the same year Davoli married, moving overseas and abandoning her music career.

== Discography ==
=== Album ===
- 1976 - Fra tanto amore
- 1978 - Mia
- 1978 - Jour après jour (only released in Canada)

=== Singles ===
- 1974 - "I ragazzi giù nel campo" (Aris, AN 402)
- 1975 - "Mille volte donna" (Aris, AN 407)
- 1976 - "Due amanti fa" (Aris, AN 409)
- 1976 - "Dimme perché" (Aris, AN 420)
- 1976 - "Se fossi come lei" (Aris, AN 427)
- 1977 - "E invece con te..." (Aris, AN 439)
- 1977 - "Chissà cosa cerchi" (Aris, AN 442)
- 1978 - "Diverso amore mio" (Aris, AN 447)
- 1978 - "Mia" (Aris, AN 451)
- 1980 - "Incertezza d'amore" (Discospray, AG 10151)
