= Leano Morelli =

Italian singer-songwriter and musician

- Born: Ileano Morelli; 1 October 1950 (age 75); Villa Minozzo, Reggio Emilia, Italy
- Occupation: Singer-songwriter

Leano Morelli (born Ileano Morelli, 1 October 1950) is an Italian singer-songwriter and musician.

== Life and career ==
Born in Villa Minozzo, Reggio Emilia, Morelli started composing songs at a very young age. Put under contract by Phonogram Records, he got his first hit in 1976, with the song "Un amore diverso", which ranked #18 on the Italian hit parade. Between 1976 and 1981 he entered the competition at the Sanremo Music Festival four times. His hits include "Cantare gridare sentirsi tutti uguali", which he presented at the 1978 Festivalbar, and "Io ti porterei", which peaked at seventh place on the Italian hit parade. Starting from the mid-1980s he focused his activities on live performances and concerts.

== Discography ==
Album

- 1977: Nata libera
- 1978: Leano Morelli
- 1979: Roma Londra Milano
- 1984: Dovevi amarmi così
- 1995: Il meglio
- 1997: Leano Morelli canta i successi dei I Nomadi e Guccini
- 1998: Leano Morelli canta i successi di Fabrizio De André
- 2003: Nata libera (Il meglio)
- 2012: Percorsi
