= Il Giardino dei Semplici =

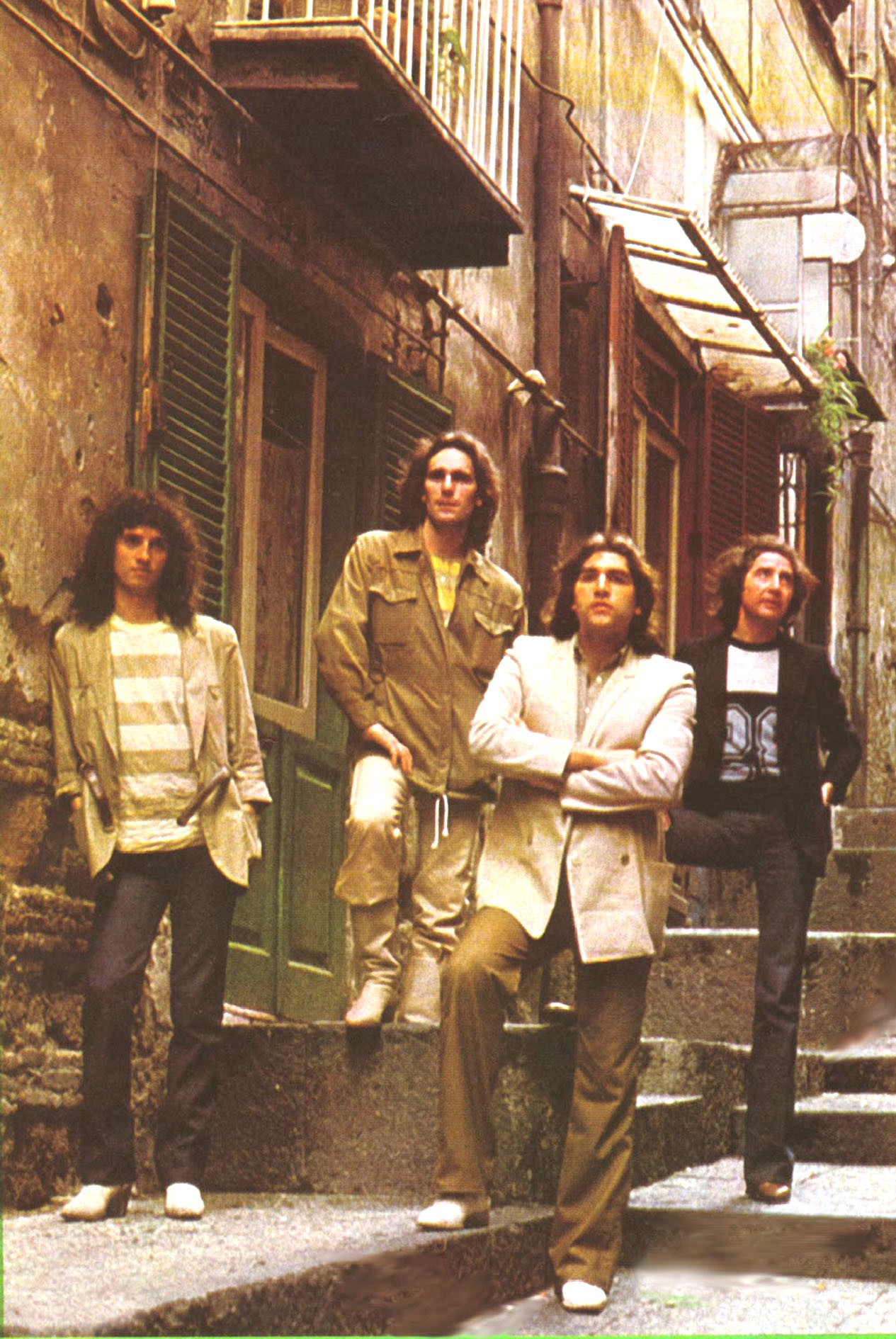
Il Giardino dei Semplici in 1979. From left to right clockwise: Gianfranco Caliendo, Andrea Arcella, Luciano Liguori, Gianni Averardi.

Il Giardino dei Semplici (also spelled just as Giardino dei Semplici and often referred as GDS) are an Italian pop-rock music group, mainly successful in the 1970s and 1980s. Formed in late 1974, throughout various decades they have released 17 studio records, 3 live albums, 18 singles and many Greatest Hits albums. They have sold 4 million records.

The group is known for its lead vocalists and singing in its signature choral falsetto; their music is a blend of genres.

== Career ==
The group was formed in Naples by Gianni Averardi and Gianfranco Caliendo, in June 1974; it was officially launched in 1975 under the production of Giancarlo Bigazzi and Totò Savio. They got an almost immediate huge success, with several singles charting on the Italian hit parade. Characterized by a style which mixes Neapolitan tradition and melodic pop-rock, they got their biggest hit in 1976, peaking at the third place on the Italian hit parade with Tu, ca nun chiagne, a cover version of a 1915 Canzone Napoletana classic. In 1977 the group entered the main competition at the Sanremo Music Festival with the song Miele, which sold 1 million copies. They attended at the popular music competition Festivalbar three times, scoring smash-hits: M'innamorai (1975); Vai (1976); Concerto in La Minore (dedicato a lei) (1978). Their 1979 song Silvie was a success in the Scandinavian countries. Later, the song was covered by artist Katri Helena with the title Helsingin helle, becoming a hit in Finland. In 1982, the group decided to self-produce their work. Their bestseller in the Eighties was the album Ed è subito Napoli, which revisited classic Neapolitan songs through acoustic, electric and electronica music arrangements. In 2001, lead singer and guitarist Gianfranco Caliendo co-wrote and co-produced the Italian hit Turuturu (often spelled as Turu Turu) - 3rd place at the Sanremo Festival in the "Young Section" - which eventually sold 2 million and 200,000 copies in the world, once being rearranged and performed by various artists as Sandy & Junior and Gisela.

In 2012, co-founder, frontman, lead singer, guitarist and composer Gianfranco Caliendo left the band to pursue a solo career, releasing three albums so far.

Il Giardino dei Semplici celebrated the 40th anniversary since the release of their first single in 2015, with the releases of an autobiographical book and a new live album. They have performed an estimate of 2,000 concerts all across Italy, as well as tours in the States and Canada in 1978 and Romania in 1992.

Tommy Esposito, drummer of the band since 1980, is one of the lyricists and composers of the smash-hit song Grande amore, performed by Il Volo in 2015.

In 2024, the two former members and founders Caliendo and Averardi will release a new record together: Liverpoolcinella.

== Personnel ==
- Andrea Arcella (keyboards, piano, synths, programming, backing and guest vocals)
- Luciano Liguori (lead vocals, backing vocals, bass guitar)
- Savio Arato (electric and acoustic guitar, backing and guest vocals)
- Tommy Esposito (drums, percussions, drum programming, backing and guest vocals)

Former members

- Gianfranco Caliendo (1974-2012; lead vocals, electric and acoustic guitar, flaute)
- Gianni Averardi (1974-1980; drums, percussions, backing and guest vocals)

== Discography ==
Albums

- 1976: Il Giardino dei Semplici (also known as Le Foglie, CBS, 81170)
- 1977: Le Favole del Giardino (CBS, 82092)
- 1979: B/N (also known as Bianco e nero, Wea, T 58089)
- 1982: ...E amiamoci (F1 Team, LP 3354)
- 1983: Giallo (F1 Team, LP 33304)
- 1985: Ed è subito Napoli (Interfonia, 352)
- 1989: Zingari (Vedette, 9336)
- 1992: Voglia Di Tenerezza (Dischi Ricordi, ORK 79315)
- 1993: Otto Quarantotto & Ventisette (Interbeat/WEA, 4509 92269-4)
- 1997: Settelune (RTI/Nemo, NR 20792)
- 2000: Canta e cammina (Celluloide, CD 307)
- 2005: Napoli unplugged (Masar, MS 3000-2)
- 2005: Trenta (Suonidelsud/Rai Trade, SS 003 ABC)
- 2010: Live Trenta (Halidon, DVD + digital live album)
- 2013: Argento vivo (Halidon, H6774)
- 2020: Concept: Aria Acqua Terra Fuoco (ALCA)
