= Victorian Undead =

2010 supernatural thriller comic by Ian Edginton and Davide Fabbri

Publication information
- Publisher: Wildstorm
- Schedule: Monthly
- Format: Limited series
- Genre: Steampunk
- Publication date: January – June 2010
- No. of issues: 6
- Main character(s): Sherlock Holmes; Doctor Watson

Creative team
- Written by: Ian Edginton
- Artist: Davide Fabbri
- Letterer: Saida Temofonte
- Colorist: Carrie Strachan
- Editor(s): Ben Abernathy; Kristy Quinn

Collected editions
- Victorian Undead: Sherlock Holmes vs. Zombies: ISBN 1-4012-2840-2
- Victorian Undead II: Sherlock Holmes vs. Dracula: ISBN 140123268X

Victorian Undead is a series of comics about Sherlock Holmes and Doctor Watson dealing with the supernatural. The first series Victorian Undead: Sherlock Holmes vs. Zombies is a six-issue American comic book limited series published by Wildstorm. The series was written by Ian Edginton, with art by Davide Fabbri. The story is set in Victorian England and follows Sherlock Holmes and Doctor Watson in the midst of a zombie outbreak. It was followed by Victorian Undead Special: Sherlock Holmes vs. Jekyll/Hyde (one issue) and a second series, Victorian Undead: Sherlock Holmes vs. Dracula (five issues), which sees Holmes and Watson helping to track down the title character (Count Dracula) before he kills Queen Victoria.

== Publication history ==
The first series ran in early 2010 and the second in early 2011 as Wildstorm folded during that period, the last three issues were published directly by the parent company, DC Comics.

== Victorian Undead: Sherlock Holmes vs. Zombies (plot) ==
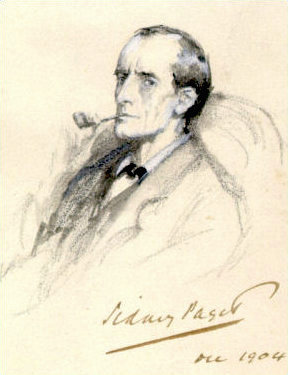
Sherlock Holmes

=== Issue 1: The Star of Ill-Omen ===
In 1854, a strange comet enters over London, releasing little fragments of which one fragment penetrated into a street pump near Broad Street in Soho. Five months later, Soho suffers what appears to be a cholera outbreak. Doctor John Snow and Reverend Henry Whitehead investigate the outbreak. While Snow postulates the cause for the outbreak, Reverend Whitehead discusses a recent confession from a tanner's apprentice about the dead coming back to life. Soon afterwards, one of Snow's deceased patients is resurrected as a zombie in front of a shocked Snow and Whitehead.

By 1898, Sherlock Holmes and Dr. John Watson investigate a charlatan who has been hypnotizing unsuspecting people into revealing their secrets. The charlatan turns out to be an advanced automaton and is disabled during a struggle with Holmes and Watson. The two are perplexed at this discovery, in which Holmes deduces that the machine was controlled by an unknown person, who personally knows Holmes. Meanwhile, two workmen at an underground railway construction yard come across a corpse. One of the workmen sees a gold ring on the corpse and greedily attempts to appropriate it, but the corpse comes to life and bites him. The zombie is decapitated by the other workman, but he is also attacked and bitten by his coworker, who turns into a zombie.

At Baker Street, Holmes and Watson later study the automaton and are then urgently summoned to Scotland Yard by Inspector Lestrade over what appears to be a murder between the aforementioned workmen before they are brought to one of the zombified workmen and a functioning head of the discovered zombie. However, Holmes and Watson are forced to call off their investigation by British Secret Service agents.

=== Issue 2: The Skull Beneath The Skin ===
Despite being warned by British Intelligence, Holmes and Watson continue their investigation and search for where the zombie was discovered. The two dig into the earthwork and find themselves in an underground city dating back to ancient London. They then find a corpse pile and look into its contents to find that some of the corpses are barely a year old. Soon they are surrounded by a horde of zombies. Being driven to a corner while learning that shooting the zombies in the head will effectively dispatch them, Holmes and Watson are saved by the arrival of heavily armed and armored Royal Marines led by the former's brother, Mycroft Holmes. After saving Holmes and Watson, Mycroft escorts them to the surface and proceeds in providing them answers.

As Holmes and Watson are being escorted, Sebastian Moran spies them from afar and travels to Whitechapel, where he reports his news to his master - an undead Professor Moriarty.

=== Issue 3: Written in Blood ===
At the Diogenes Club, Mycroft debriefs Holmes and Watson of their government's knowledge about the undead. In 1854, the Broad Street cholera outbreak was in fact a zombie outbreak, in which more than a thousand people were killed and turned into zombies in the Soho district. Initially the government failed to understand what they were dealing with until the aid of Dr. John Snow, who had prior experience with the undead, strenuously contained and culled the outbreak. In the aftermath, the entire events were covered up as a cholera outbreak and Snow kept his silence after promises were made in improving public sanitation. The source of the outbreak, however, remains unknown and there has not been any undead incidents since the last forty years until now. Holmes analyzes his brother's information and the recently discovered zombies, and believes that someone is creating and corralling the undead.

Meanwhile, Holmes' deductions are proven correct as the culprit, Professor Moriarty, has been creating an undead army in several secret locations throughout London, and releasing them to start another, but much larger, outbreak. Holmes and Watson bear witness to the outbreak and flee to the safety of Baker Street. There Holmes ties the connection of the zombies in 1854 in concurrent to a comet, as the source of the outbreak for carrying an alien disease, after reading a book written by Moriarty; concluding that his nemesis is behind this and noting that he was thought to be dead.

=== Issue 4: And Death Shall Have No Dominion ===
In a flashback to 1891, Moriarty survived his confrontation with Holmes at the Reichenbach Falls. Here Moriarty, severely wounded, is found by Sebastian Moran and inoculated with a serum based on the disease which created the undead, transforming him into a zombie but retaining his intelligence. In the present, the undead have overrun London. From Whitechapel, Moriarty reveals to Moran that he never intended to use the outbreak to force the government to yield to him, but instead desires to spread the outbreak further and forge an undead empire. Moran is morally perturbed by his master's intentions and attempts to kill him, but is infected in the process before escaping with his life.

At Baker Street Holmes and Watson, along with Mrs. Hudson, have barricaded inside. However, they are saved by the military that was sent out by Mycrroft Holmes. As they are evacuating the premise, a dying Moran finds Holmes and Watson, informing them of Moriarty before expiring.

=== Issue 5: The Earth Shall Give Up Its Dead ===
The undead have taken London with Moriarty reigning from a captured Buckingham Palace. Holmes and Watson have relocated to Windsor Castle, being used as a command center by the British government. They are granted an audience with Lord Bellinger, the Prime Minister, who informs Holmes that his government had anticipated another outbreak only because after previously discovering foreign agents were found attempting to steal the undead remains from the Soho outbreak for their respective nations in order to cultivate the undead virus as a biological weapon. As of now, Moriarty holds the ultimate deadly weapon in the world. Holmes heavily advises Lord Bellinger that the only option to contain and neutralize the exponentially growing outbreak is to scorch London at the cost of losing the nation's capital.

Holme's advisement is soon put forward as the Royal Navy is set to bombard London after the undead have broken through Westminster Bridge. However, Holmes is aghast to learn that the government intends to let Moriarty be burned along with London rather than having him dealt with directly. But thanks to Mycroft, Holmes and Watson are provided with a launch into London to face Moriarty themselves. Before leaving, Holmes implores Mycroft of how Trelawney Hope, the current Secretary of State, became tasked in tactical deployments in which his brother explains that Hope succeeded from his predecessors of the Home Secretary, who fell to the zombies, based on a contingency plan.

Holmes and Watson land in Whitechapel after deducing Moriarty's location from the clay soil found on Moran's footwear. The two enter a slaughterhouse where they are confronted by an apparently very-much alive Moriarty.

=== Issue 6: Inferno ===
Holmes confronts Moriarty's automaton about how the earlier one had mesmerized Trelawney Hope. Hope realized that his safe and the contingency plan were compromised and had engaged Holmes, who in turn was able to undo Moriarty's control of Hope's mind. Moriarty makes taunts about his reign as monarch. After blinding the automaton Holmes and Watson escape into the streets of Whitechapel. They make their way into the Underground and come out of a secret station that leads into Buckingham Palace. Holmes has deduced that is where Moriarty is based on the comments he had transmitted via the automaton. Watson separates from Holmes after being reminded to follow the plan.

Naval ships in the Thames River open fire on central London. Meanwhile upstairs in the Palace Holmes encounters Moriarty who he manages to badly burn with a grenade that also sets the room on fire. While he admits that it will be hard to kill Moriarty, Holmes says he can still break him since the "body is only a system of pulley and levers." Moriarty is beaten in the fight and Holmes beheads him. Out on a balcony Watson fires a flare and Mycroft Holmes, aboard an airship, heads for the signal. Holmes tries to finds Moriarty's head as Watson enters the burning room and says that there is no time. The two run from the Palace as the airship approaches and then begins to drop bombs. The second Great Fire of London is shown burning away the "plague." Sailors pull the last of the zombies out of the river with fishing nets.

Three months later London is being rebuilt as Holmes and Watson discuss the revenant event, with Holmes noting they are "venturing into the unknown." In the final panels Moriarty is shown in an underground lab, and he has staples in his neck as he works on the brain of a detached head on the table.

== Victorian Undead II (Plots) ==
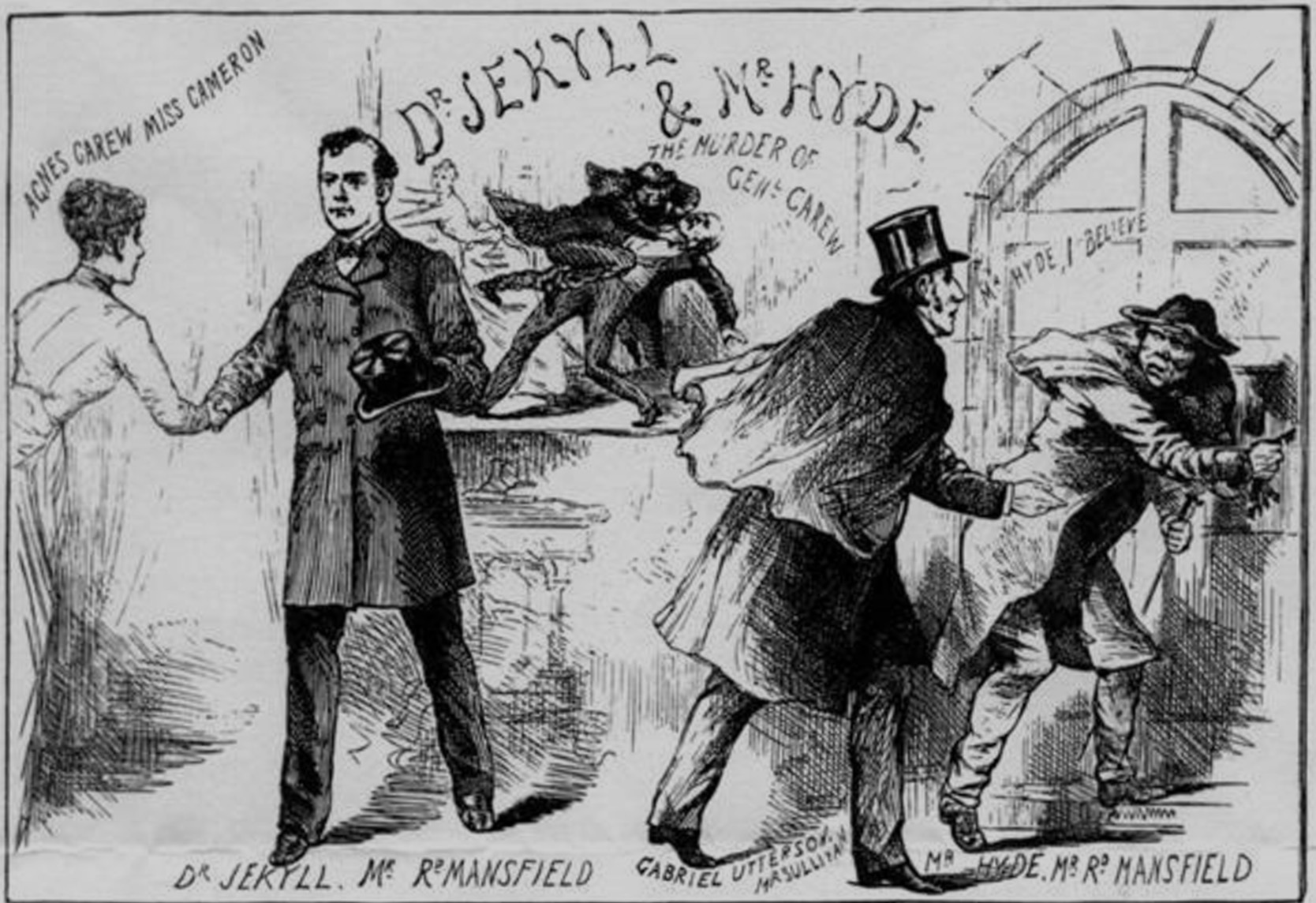
Jekyll and Hyde

=== Jekyll & Hyde ===
In 1899, nearly a year after the revenant attack on London, as the city continues to rebuild, Holmes, having completed recreating his lost files, is contacted by Mr. Utterson regarding the recent strange behavior of his friend Dr. Henry Jekyll, including his role in the death of a young girl and a mysterious assistant known only as "Edward Hyde". Investigating Jekyll's lab, Holmes and Watson's examination of the tissue consumed by dead flies in the lab reveals that Jekyll has access to a revenant, but a confrontation with Jekyll that night reveals that he is the revenant; having suffered a psychotic breakdown from stress prior to the revenant outbreak that fractured his personality, Jekyll initially maintained control through a serum provided by a Limehouse herbalist, but after he was attacked by a revenant and his supplier killed in the fire, he was forced to ration his supply and restrain himself, the infection having resulted in him retaining his own mind while under the serum's influence while occasionally reverting to his other persona and revenant instincts, as well as escaping his confinement on some occasions. With no way to contain Hyde as he escapes his house, Jekyll begs Holmes to kill him while he is still himself after being injected with the last of his serum, with Watson mercifully shooting his head off.

=== Sherlock Holmes vs. Dracula ===
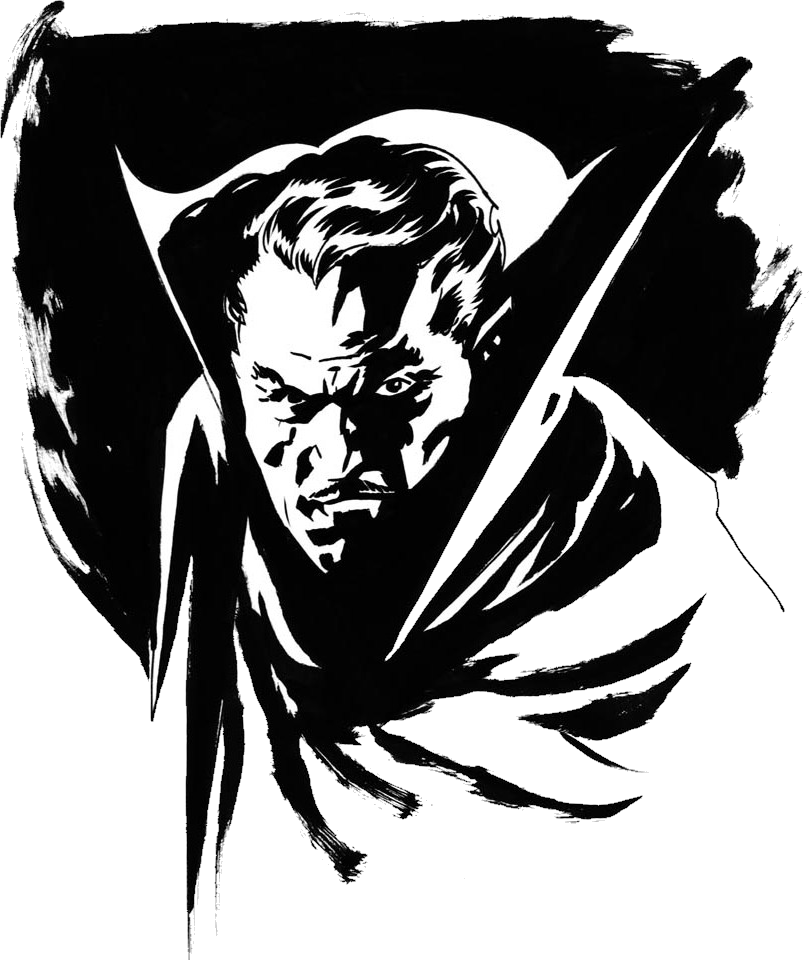
Count Dracula

It is one year later (1900), and contacted by a maritime insurance company to investigate the deaths of the crew of the schooner the Demeter, Holmes and Watson's investigation of the solicitor's office that took custody of the ship's cargo reveals that the entire household has abruptly died of the bubonic plague, and they are attacked by a group of gypsies before being saved by another group. Talking with their saviours, Holmes and Watson learn that the other group are known as the Szgany, who serve the vampire known as Count Dracula.

Meanwhile, Lord Godalmning has introduced Queen Victoria to Count Dracula, claiming that the Count is an expert in diseases of the blood and will be able to treat the condition that curtails the royal family. In reality, Dracula and Godalming intend to unleash an infection on the empire – using the diseased earth brought to Britain via the Demeter, Dracula taking the throne in the ensuing chaos. As Holmes and Watson track the boxes of earth to Carfax Abbey, they discover Professor Abraham van Helsing, Jonathan Harker, Doctor John Seward and Quincey Morris at the abbey already, the two groups exchanging information before they are attacked by the vampire Lucy Westenra and a group of Dracula's 'get', half-deads animated by his blood as plague carriers. Having destroyed the plague-carriers and driven Lucy away, the group meet up at Baker Street to discuss their separate approaches to the current investigation, including Godalming's betrayal and the suicide of Jonathan's wife Mina after Dracula bit her (Lucy escaped being staked because Godalming tipped her off). As they ponder how Dracula made contact with the firm that arranged his arrival in Britain, the group are visited by Mycroft Holmes, who reveals that Godalming was an agent of the Diogenes Club sent on a mission to investigate old legends as means of acquiring an 'alternative arsenal' for Britain after the revenant attack, only to betray his country for power.

Tracking Dracula to his new lair based on where the boxes were delivered, they discover the dead Godalming - drained by Lucy when Dracula became frustrated with him - and Dracula's brides, with Seward being killed before Lucy allows the brides to be destroyed and shield her before fleeing, dismissing Dracula as an antiquated fool for following old superstitions (apparently since she was turned in modern times, her undead form is a bit more resistant to holy symbols like crosses). Using Toby the bloodhound – wounded during the revenant attack on London but still possessing his keen nose – the group tracks Dracula to the Palace, where they manage to expose him during a royal ball. Dracula attacks and kills the Queen, then tries to escape while Holmes and Morris jump on Dracula's transformed bat-like form and force him to land in a nearby construction site. Morris dies of his injuries before Holmes manages to cut a vital rope so that the scaffolding impales Dracula, and Holmes then beheads him, thus ending his threat once and for all (it is also revealed that the "Queen" was an actress hired to impersonate her). However Holmes deduces this is just the start of the world becoming more known to supernatural forces.

== Rondo Hatton Classic Horror Awards ==
The Rondo Hatton Classic Horror Award is an annual award presented by the Classic Horror Film Board to honour outstanding works in horror in film, television, home video, and publishing, as voted on by the general public. Victorian Undead has received a nomination in 2010.

== Collected editions ==
Both series have been collected into trade paperbacks:

- Victorian Undead: Sherlock Holmes vs. Zombies (collects first series, 144 pages, Titan Books, December 2010, ISBN 0-85768-051-X, Wildstorm, October 2010, ISBN 1-4012-2840-2)
- Victorian Undead II: Sherlock Holmes vs. Dracula (collects one-shot special and second series, 144 pages, Titan Books, December 2011, ISBN 0-85768-880-4, DC Comics, October 2011, ISBN 1-4012-3268-X)
