= Santino Rocchetti =

Italian singer-songwriter and musician (born 1946)

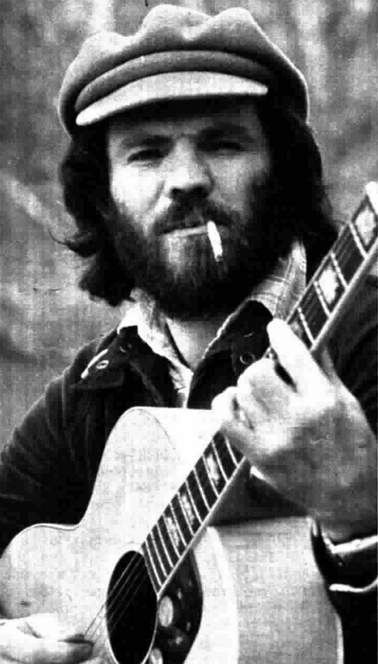
- Born: 13 July 1946 (age 80); Montalto di Castro, Viterbo, Kingdom of Italy
- Occupation: singer-songwriter

Sante "Santino" Rocchetti (born 13 July 1946) is an Italian singer-songwriter and musician.

== Life and career ==
Born in Montalto di Castro, Viterbo, Italy, Rocchetti started his career as founder and lead member of the group "I Rokketti". After a number of experiences in other groups, he started a solo career in 1975, getting an immediate hit with the song "Pelle di sole", which ranked #15 on the Italian hit parade. Between 1976 and 1978 he entered the competition at the Sanremo Music Festival three times, ranking sixth in 1978 with the song "Armonia e poesia". Starting from the 1980s he focused his activities on live performances and concerts.

== Discography ==
Album

- 1977: Dedicato a te (Fonit Cetra)
- 1978: Santino Rocchetti (Fonit Cetra)
- 1980: Santino Rocchetti (Fonit Cetra)

Singles

- 1975: "Pelle di sole" (Fonit Cetra, SP 1580)
- 1976: "E tu mi manchi" (Fonit Cetra, SP 1607)
- 1976: "Dolcemente bambina" (Fonit Cetra, SP 1618)
- 1977: "Dedicato a te" (Fonit Cetra, SP 1642)
- 1977: "Amado mio" (Fonit Cetra, SP 1661)
- 1978: "Armonia e poesia" (Fonit Cetra, SP 1675)
- 1978: "Divina" (Fonit Cetra, SP 1691)
- 1979: "Per favore Angela no" (Fonit Cetra, SP 1713)
- 1980: "Macché amore" (Fonit Cetra, SP 1737)
- 1982: "Rodaggio d'amore" (SIF, NP 10025)
