= Maria Giovanna Elmi =

Italian former television announcer, presenter, journalist, actress and singer

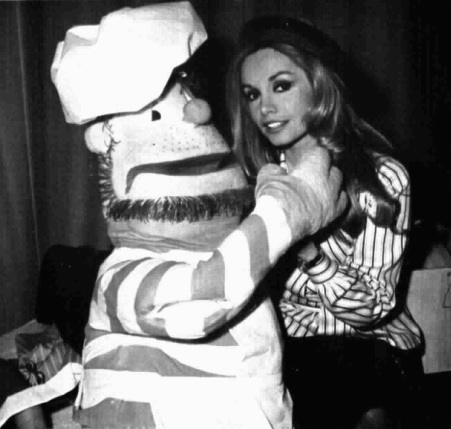
Elmi in 1975

Maria Giovanna Elmi (born 25 August 1940, in Rome) is an Italian former television announcer, presenter, journalist, actress and singer.

Born in Rome, Italy, Elmi attended the faculty of letter at the university, then in 1968 she was employed by RAI TV as an announcer. Her popularity raised in early seventies, when she hosted the children show Il dirigibile together with the singer Mal, playing the fairy Azzurrina, from which she inherited the nickname "fatina" (i.e. young fairy in Italian).

Elmi hosted two editions of the Sanremo Music Festival (in 1977 and 1978). She ranked at first place in two public polls of the most appreciated female television personalities in 1970 (Doxa) and in 1981 (Abacus).

In 1970, Elmi also became a journalist and publicist, collaborating for three years with the newspaper Il Messaggero and later with a large number of magazines and newspapers. In 2005 she took part to the reality show L'isola dei famosi, ranking third. She considers herself Roman Catholic.
