= Alberto Manzi =

Italian mayor, teacher and TV host (1924–1997)

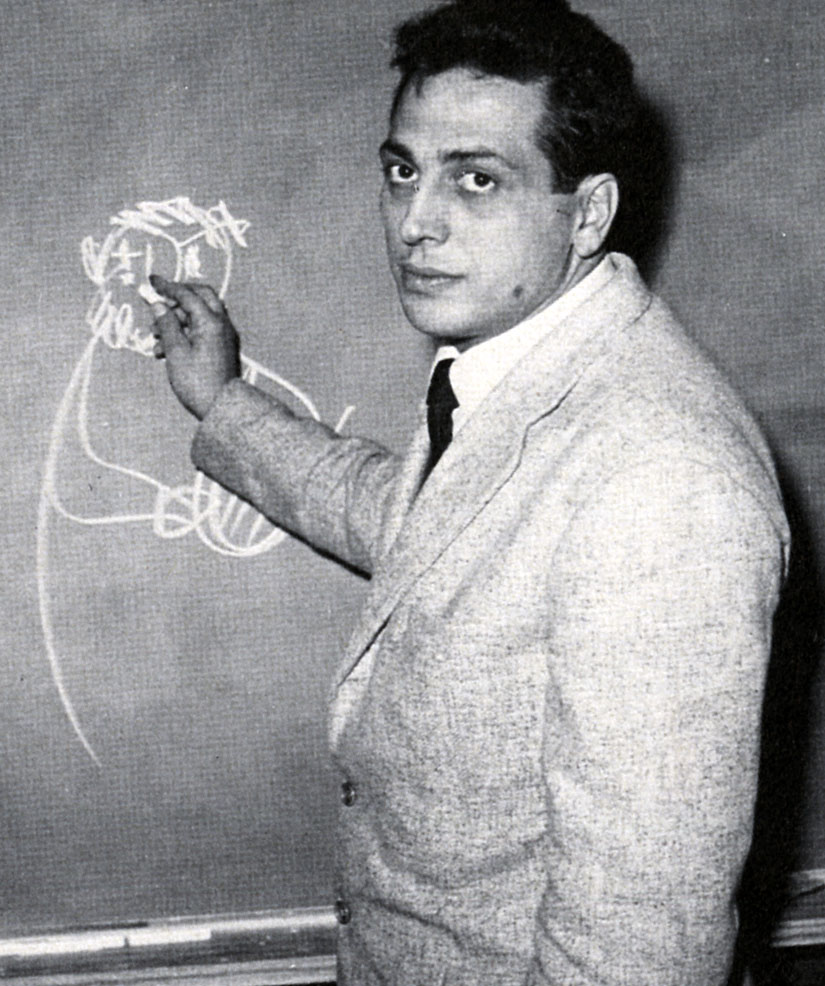
- Manzi in the 1960s

Mayor of Pitigliano
- In office 23 April 1995 – 29 October 1997

Personal details
- Born: 3 November 1924 Rome, Kingdom of Italy
- Died: 4 December 1997 (aged 73) Pitigliano, Grosseto, Italy
- Party: Democratic Party of the Left
- Occupation: Teacher; television host; writer
- Known for: Non è mai troppo tardi

Alberto Manzi (Italian pronunciation: [alˈbɛrto ˈmandzi]; 3 November 1924 – 4 December 1997) was an Italian mayor, school teacher, writer and television host, best known for his popular television show Non è mai troppo tardi (Italian for It's never too late), an educational TV programme broadcast in Italy between 1959 and 1968.

== Biography ==
Manzi was born on 3 November 1924 in Rome.

He attended navy studies before ending his primary training high school degree and followed a peculiar path of studies, achieving three academic degrees: in biology, pedagogy and philosophy.

He worked as a porter and an educator in a teenage prison in Rome before a full-time job as a primary school teacher.

He was chosen to host the TV programme Non è mai troppo tardi, which made him a celebrity, conceived as an auxiliary help in the social struggle against illiteracy; the show was broadcasting real-life primary school classroom lessons, with revolutionary concepts in didactic methods for those times. It started broadcasting in 1960.

He also published several novels, the most famous of which is Orzowei (1955), from which a serial was adapted for the Tv dei ragazzi (a now-defunct Italian "Children TV").

From 23 April 1995 to 29 October 1997, he was mayor of Pitigliano, in the province of Grosseto, Tuscany.

He died on 4 December 1997 in Pitigliano.

== Legacy ==
An open-air archaeology museum in Pitigliano is named in his honour.

== See also ==
- Adult education
- Educational television
