= Sanremo Music Festival 1989 =

Italian song contest (39th edition)

Dates and venue
- Semi-final 1: 21 February 1989
- Semi-final 2: 22 February 1989
- Semi-final 3: 23 February 1989
- Semi-final 4: 24 February 1989
- Final: 25 February 1989
- Venue: Teatro Ariston; Sanremo, Italy

Organisation
- Broadcaster: Radiotelevisione italiana (RAI)
- Artistic director: Adriano Aragozzini
- Presenters: Rosita Celentano, Paola Dominguin, Danny Quinn, Gianmarco Tognazzi

Big Artists section
- Number of entries: 24
- Winner: "Ti lascerò" Fausto Leali and Anna Oxa

Emerging Acts section
- Number of entries: 8
- Winner: "Bambini"; Paola Turci

Newcomers' section
- Number of entries: 16
- Winner: "Canzoni"; Mietta

The Sanremo Music Festival 1989 (Italian: Festival di Sanremo 1989), officially the 39th Italian Song Festival (39º Festival della canzone italiana), was the 39th annual Sanremo Music Festival, held at the Teatro Ariston in Sanremo between 21 and 25 February 1989 and broadcast by Radiotelevisione italiana (RAI). The show was presented by Rosita Celentano, Paola Dominguin, Danny Quinn e Gianmarco Tognazzi. Kay Sandvick and Clare Ann Matz hosted the segments from the Sanremo Casino where a number of foreign guests performed.

The winners of the Big Artists section were Fausto Leali and Anna Oxa with the song "Ti lascerò", and Mietta won the Newcomers section with the song "Canzoni". Leali and Oxa were then selected to represent Italy in the Eurovision Song Contest 1989, with "Avrei voluto".

Only in this edition it was introduced the "Emerging artists" category, whose members were selected through the television contest "Aspettando Sanremo" broadcast on Radio 1 and hosted by Claudio Lippi. The winner was Paola Turci with the song "Come bambini".

== Participants and results ==
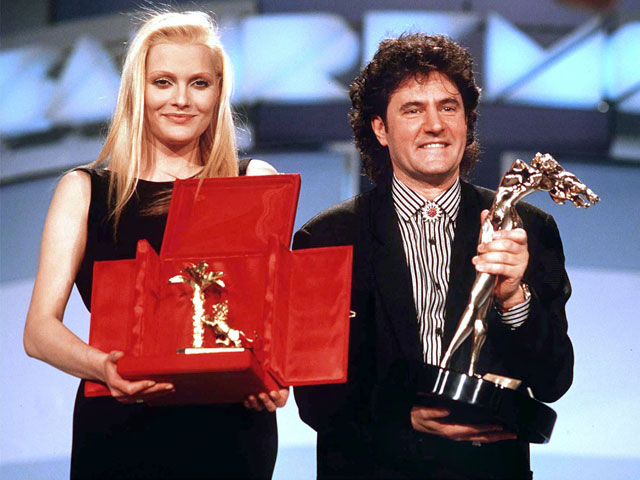
Anna Oxa and Fausto Leali holding the first prize

=== Big Artists ===
Big Artists section
Song	Artist(s)	Songwriter(s)	Rank
"Ti lascerò"	Fausto Leali and Anna Oxa	Franco Fasano; Fausto Leali; Franco Ciani; Fabrizio Berlincioni; Sergio Bardotti	1
"Le mamme"	Toto Cutugno	Toto Cutugno; Stefano Borgia	2
"Cara terra mia"	Al Bano and Romina Power	Albano Carrisi; Romina Power; Vito Pallavicini	3
"Non finisce così"	Riccardo Fogli	Laurex; Marco Patrignani; Claudio Cofani; Franca Evangelisti	4
"Vasco"	Jovanotti	Lorenzo Cherubini; Claudio Cecchetto; Luca Cersosimo	5
"Se non avessi te"	Fiordaliso	Toto Cutugno	6
"Esatto!"	Francesco Salvi	Francesco Salvi; Silvio Melloni; Mario Natale	7
"Chi voglio sei tu"	Ricchi e Poveri	Piero Cassano; Adelio Cogliati	8
"Almeno tu nell'universo"	Mia Martini	Bruno Lauzi; Maurizio Fabrizio	9 / Critics Award
"Io come farò"	Ornella Vanoni	Mauro Pagani; Gino Paoli; Sergio Bardotti	10
"Il mio pianoforte"	Peppino di Capri	Rodolfo Fiorillo; Mimmo Di Francia; Giuseppe Faiella	11
"Il babà è una cosa seria"	Marisa Laurito	Salvatore Palomba; Eduardo Alfieri	12
"Questa volta no"	Gino Paoli	Paola Penzo; Gino Paoli	13
"‘Na canzuncella doce doce"	Renato Carosone	Claudio Mattone	14
"Cosa resterà degli anni '80"	Raf	Giancarlo Bigazzi; Giuseppe Dati; Raf	15
"Il cuore delle donne"	Dori Ghezzi	Mauro Paoluzzi; Oscar Avogadro; Roberto Ferri	16
"Se me lo dicevi prima"	Enzo Jannacci	Enzo Jannacci; Maurizio Bassi	17
"Ciao"	Gigliola Cinquetti	Gepy & Gepy; Massimiliano Governi; Roberto Russo	18
"A che servono gli Dei"	Rossana Casale	Maurizio Fabrizio; Guido Morra	19
"E allora e allora"	Tullio De Piscopo	Mario Capuano; Giosy Capuano; Tullio De Piscopo	20
"Come mi vuoi"	Eduardo De Crescenzo	Mariella Nava; Eduardo De Crescenzo	21
"Scusa"	Fred Bongusto	Fred Bongusto; Emilio Campassi; Sergio Iodice	22
"La fine del mondo"	Gigi Sabani	Toto Cutugno; Franco Fasano; Depsa	23
"Rifarsi una vita"	Sergio Caputo	Sergio Caputo	24

=== Emerging artists ===
Emerging section
Song	Artist(s)	Songwriter(s)	Rank
"Bambini"	Paola Turci	Roberto Righini; Alfredo Rizzo	1 / Critics Award
"Sei tu"	Stefano Borgia	Toto Cutugno; Stefano Borgia	2
"E sia così"	Aleandro Baldi	Aleandro Civai	3
"Per lei"	Gepy & Gepy	Gepy & Gepy	4
"'Gli anni migliori"	Santarosa	Fabrizio Berlincioni; Dario Baldan Bembo	Eliminated
"Il poeta"	Marina Arcangeli	Marco Luberti	Eliminated
"Questa pappa"	Aida	Alberto Salerno; Mario & Giosy Capuano	Eliminated
"Uno di noi"	Steve Rogers Band	Massimo Riva; Maurizio Solieri	Eliminated

=== Newcomers ===
Newcomers section
Song	Artist(s)	Songwriter(s)	Rank
"Canzoni"	Mietta	Amedeo Minghi	1 / Critics Award
"Io e il cielo"	Jo Chiarello	Elio Palumbo; Alberto Cheli	2
"E quel giorno non mi perderai più"	Franco Fasano	Fabrizio Berlincioni; Franco Fasano	3
"Pelle di luna"	Gitano	Dora Vuolo Famiglietti; Mino Reitano; Antonio Fusco; Gegè Reitano	4
"Amore è"	Gianluca Guidi	Alberto Testa; Augusto Martelli	Semi-finalist
"Certi uomini"	Aida Satta Flores	Aida Satta Flores	Semi-finalist
"Se"	Élite	Bettalico; Gian Paolo Compagnoni	Semi-finalist
"Si chiama Hélène"	Stefano Ruffini	Grazia Di Michele; Marco Luberti	Semi-finalist
"'A paura"	Antonio Murro	Vito Mercurio	Eliminated
"Bastardo"	Gloria Nuti	Roberto Casini; Gloria Nuti	Eliminated
"Bocca di fragola"	Valentini	Antonio Valentini	Eliminated
"Ladri di biciclette"	Ladri di Biciclette	Paolo Belli	Eliminated
"Le ragazze come me"	Meccano	Elio Aldrighetti; Walter Bassani; Ierovante	Eliminated
"Stella"	Brigitta & Benedicta Boccoli	Lorenzo Cherubini; Matteo Bonsanto; Roberto Rossi	Eliminated
"Tentazioni"	Sharks	Dario Fochi; Vasco Rossi; Fabrizio Palermo; Mauro Palermo; Frankie Di Foggia; Andrea Ge	Eliminated
"Tutti i cuori sensibili"	Stefania La Fauci	Erminio Sinni; Stefania La Fauci	Eliminated

== Guest acts ==
- Ray Charles and Dee Dee Bridgewater
- Charles Aznavour
- Elton John
- Boy George
- Chris Rea
- Johnny Clegg
- Nick Kamen
- Roachford
- Tracy Spencer
- Europe
- Chico Buarque de Hollanda
- Toni Childs
- Belen Thomas
- Depeche Mode
- Sandie Shaw
- Little Steven
- Spagna
- Cliff Richard
- Kim Wilde
- Tanita Tikaram
- Simply Red
- Ofra Haza
- Joan Manuel Serrat
- Tuck & Patti
- Bros
- Yazz

== Broadcasts ==
=== Local broadcasts ===
All shows were broadcast on Rai Uno.

=== International broadcasts ===
Known details on the broadcasts in each country, including the specific broadcasting stations and commentators are shown in the tables below.

International broadcasters of the Sanremo Music Festival 1989
Country	Broadcaster	Channel(s)	Commentator(s)	Ref(s)
Yugoslavia	JRT	TV Beograd 1 (Note: Delayed broadcast on 6 July at 11:00 (CEST))		
Yugoslavia	JRT	TV Ljubljana 2	Neva Zajc	
