= List of Italian films of 2023 =

A list of Italian-produced and co-produced feature films released or scheduled for release in Italy in 2023.

== Films ==
| Title (Domestic title) | Cast & Crew | Release date | Co-production | Ref. |
|---|---|---|---|---|
| Scordato | Director: Rocco Papaleo Cast: Rocco Papaleo, Giorgia | 13 April | IT | |
| I Told You So (Te l’avevo detto) | Director: Ginevra Elkann Cast: Riccardo Scamarcio, Valeria Golino, Valeria Bruni Tedeschi, Danny Huston, Alba Rohrwacher, Greta Scacchi | 8 September | IT | |
| Come un fiore | Director: Benedicta Boccoli Cast: Gisella Burinato, Fulvia Lorenzetti, Gaia Zucchi | 20 October | IT | |
| La chimera | Director: Alice Rohrwacher Cast: Josh O'Connor, Carol Duarte, Vincenzo Nemolato, Alba Rohrwacher, Isabella Rossellini | 23 November | IT-FR-SW | |
