= Senza pietà =

Senza pietà (Italian for 'Mercilessly', lit. 'Without mercy') may refer to:

== Films ==
- Senza pietà (1921 film), 1921 film by Emilio Ghione
- Without Pity (1948 film), 1948 film by Alberto Lattuada

== Music ==
- "Senza pietà" (song), 1999 song by Anna Oxa
- Senza pietà (album), 1999 album by Anna Oxa
