= Franco Fasano =

Italian composer

- Born: Gianfranco Tommaso Fasano; 30 June 1961 (age 64); Albenga, Italy
- Occupations: Singer; Songwriter

Gianfranco Tommaso Fasano (born 30 June 1961), known professionally as Franco Fasano, is an Italian singer-songwriter and composer.

== Life and career ==
Born in Albenga, Fasano spent his childhood in Alassio and studied singing and composition with Pippo Barzizza. He debuted at 15 years old recording some songs for a small local label.

Starting from the 1980s Fasano established himself as a successful songwriter, composing songs for Mina, Drupi, Iva Zanicchi, Anna Oxa, Fausto Leali, Peppino di Capri, Fiordaliso and Nicola Arigliano, among others. He also recorded several albums and participated to several editions of the Sanremo Music Festival as a singer.

Since the mid-1990s Fasano specialized in songs for children, and several of his songs won the Zecchino d'Oro festival. He was also artistic director of Radio Baby, a satellite radio station entirely dedicated to music for children.

== Discography ==
Album

- 1990 - Un cielo che non sai
- 1992 - Tempo al tempo
- 1994 - Qualunque sia la verità
- 2000 - Scherzando scherzando
- 2012 - fff - FORTISSIMISSIMO
