= L'ispettore Giusti =

- Directed by: Sergio Martino
- Starring: Enrico Montesano:
- Country of origin: Italy
- Original language: Italian
- No. of seasons: 1
- No. of episodes: 6

Original release
- Network: Canale 5
- Release: May 6 – May 17, 1999

L'ispettore Giusti is an Italian television series.

== Cast ==
- Enrico Montesano as Inspector Giusto Giusti
- Mietta as Caterina Foglia
- Paola Saluzzi as Claudia Sartor
- Nicola Arigliano as Ermanno Giusti
- Sergio Sivori as Fejim Corcos
- Francesco Casale as Marco
- Bed Cerchiai as Nico

== See also ==
- List of Italian television series
