= Oggi sono io =

1999 song written and recorded by Alex Britti

Single by Alex Britti

from the album It.Pop
- Language: Italian
- Released: 26 February 1999
- Genre: Pop
- Length: 3:49
- Label: Universal
- Songwriter: Alex Britti

Alex Britti singles chronology
"Gelido" (1998)	"Oggi sono io" (1999)	"Mi piaci" (1999)

"Oggi sono io" (English: "Today it's me") is a song written and recorded by Italian singer Alex Britti. With this song, he won the 49th Italian Song Festival in 1999 in the category "newcomers". It also had great success in the charts of Italy, taking the first place.

== Track listing ==
CD single

1. "Oggi sono io" – 3:52
2. "Solo una volta" (Don Carlos Remix) – 4:08

== Charts ==
Chart performance for "Oggi sono io"
Chart (1999)	Peak position
Europe (Music & Media)	51
Italy (Musica e dischi)	1
Italy Airplay (Music & Media)	2

== Certifications ans sales ==
Certifications for "Oggi sono io" by Alex Britti
Region	Certification	Certified units/sales
Italy (FIMI)	Platinum	50,000^{‡}
^{‡} Sales+streaming figures based on certification alone.

== Mina version ==
"Oggi sono io"

Promotional single by Mina
- Language: Italian
- Released: 2001
- Genre: Pop
- Length: 3:57
- Label: GSU
- Songwriter: Alex Britti

Mina singles chronology
"Tutti gli zeri del mondo" (2000)	"Oggi sono io" (2001)	"Succhiando l'uva" (2002)

In 2001, Italian singer Mina recorded a cover version of the song. It was first introduced to the public on March 31 of the same year during the broadcast of the documentary Mina in Studio. According to Paolo Limiti, it was recorded in one take. The singer herself later confirmed this, also stating that she immediately liked the song as soon as she heard it, deciding to record a cover, but in a "heavier" manner.

=== Certifications ans sales ===
Certifications for "Oggi sono io" by Mina
Region	Certification	Certified units/sales
Italy (FIMI)	Gold	25,000^{‡}
^{‡} Sales+streaming figures based on certification alone.
