= Sergio Bardotti =

Italian lyricist, composer and record producer (1939–2007)

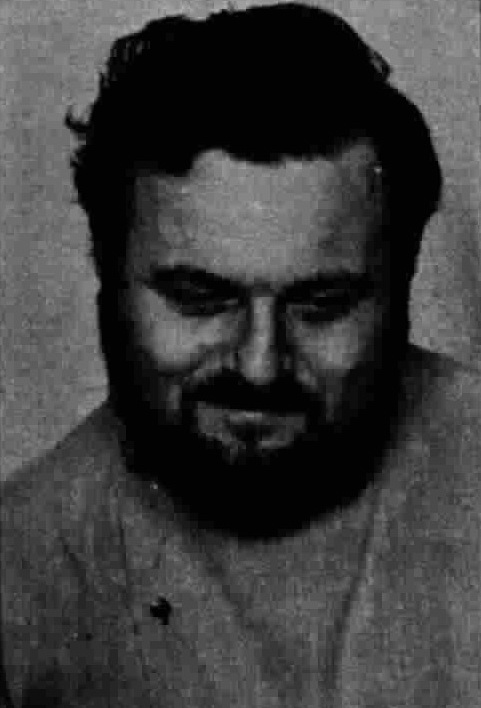
- Born: 14 February 1939; Pavia, Kingdom of Italy
- Died: 11 April 2007 (aged 68); Rome, Italy
- Occupation(s): lyricist and record producer

Sergio Bardotti (14 February 1939 – 11 April 2007) was an Italian lyricist, composer and record producer.

== Life and career ==
Born in Pavia, Bardotti studied piano for seven years and graduated from conservatory with a degree in Theory and Solfeggio. After having performed in nightclubs with the stage name Sergio Dotti, he moved to Rome, employed by RCA for his literary branch.

His first song as lyricist was "La nostra casa", which was released as B-side of the Gino Paoli's hit "Sapore di sale", launching his musical career. Shortly later Bardotti started a long collaboration with Sergio Endrigo, which among other things got them the winning of the 1968 Sanremo Music Festival with the song "Canzone per te". In the late 1960s he also started producing and collaborating as songwriter with Lucio Dalla, and since 1969 with Chico Buarque, who had fled to Italy from the Brazilian military regime. In the early 1970s he collaborated with Vinicius de Moraes in a number of albums, and with Luis Bacalov and New Trolls for Concerto grosso. With Bacalov, he was also the author of a successful musical comedy for children, The musicians.

In 1989 Bardotti won a second Sanremo Music Festival with the song "Ti lascerò", performed by Anna Oxa and Fausto Leali. Since the 1990s he worked mainly as a television writer.
