= Canzoni (song) =

Single by Mietta

from the album Canzoni
- B-side: "La mia casa"
- Released: 1989
- Genre: Pop
- Label: Fonit Cetra
- Songwriters: Amedeo Minghi, Pasquale Panella
- Producers: Gabriele Varano, Giovanni Sanjust

Mietta singles chronology
"Sogno" (1988)	"Canzoni" (1989)	"Vattene amore" (1990)

Audio
- "Canzoni" on YouTube

"Canzoni" ('Songs') is a 1989 song composed by Amedeo Minghi and Pasquale Panella and recorded by Mietta. The song won the newcomer section as well as the critics award at the 39th edition of the Sanremo Music Festival.

Corriere della Sera's music critic Mario Luzzatto Fegiz praised the song, describing it as "very charming", "melodic and dreamlike piece".

== Track listing ==
No.	Title	Writer(s)	Length
1.	"Canzoni"	Amedeo Minghi, Pasquale Panella	4:01
2.	"La mia casa"	Gioacchino Rispoli	3:43

== Charts ==
=== Weekly charts ===
Chart (1989)	Peak position
Italy (Musica e dischi)	7
Italy Airplay (Music & Media)	1
