= Gaia Zucchi =

Italian actress

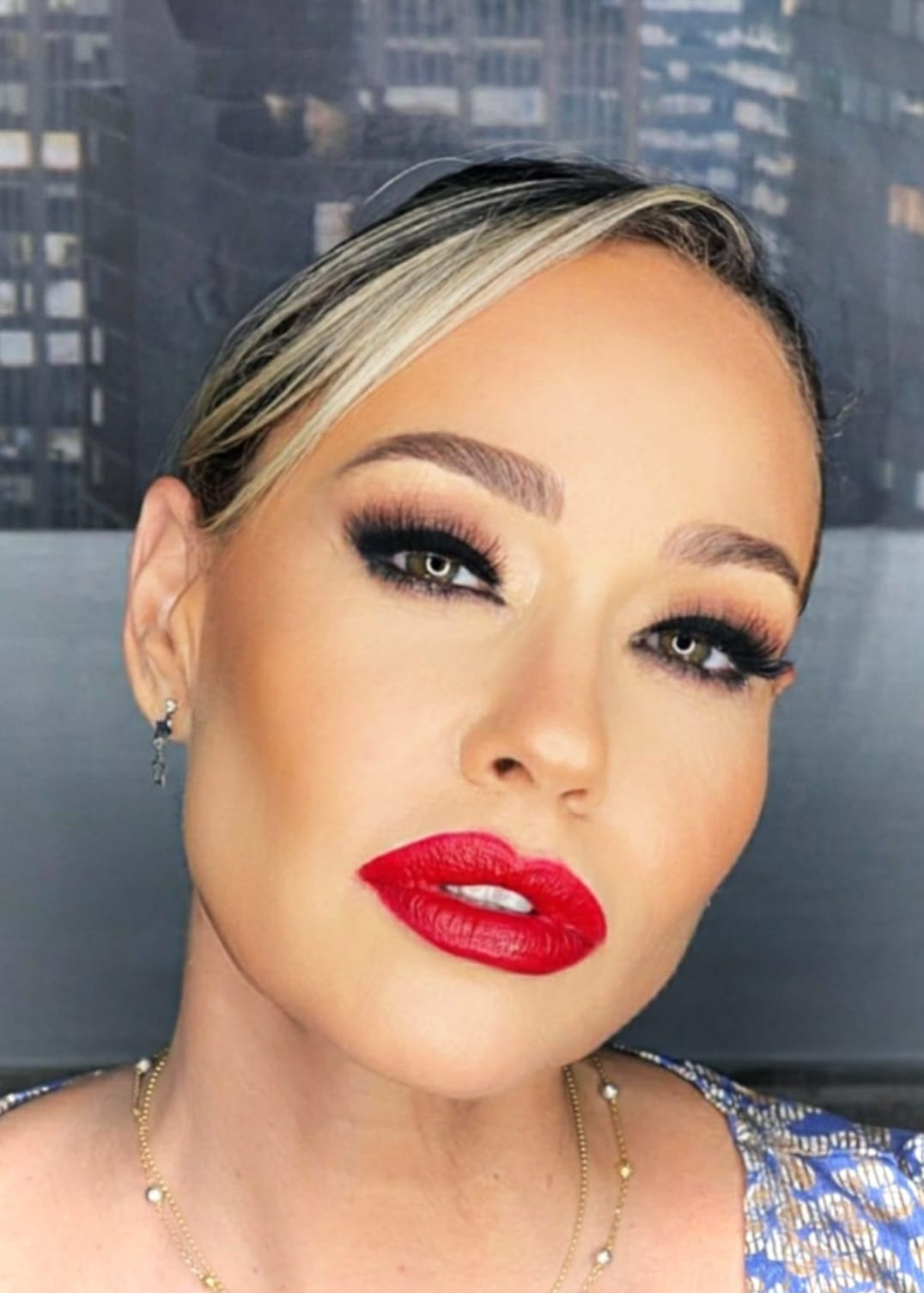
- Gaia Zucchi in Pisa, september 2023
- Born: 27 March 1970 (age 56); Rome, Italy
- Occupation: Actress
- Years active: 1989–present
- Children: Leonardo and Mia
- Website: gaiazucchi.com

Gaia Zucchi (born 27 March 1970) is an Italian theater, television and movie actress.

== Biography ==
Born in Rome in 1970, she has aristocratic origins on her mother's side. Her great-grandfather was General Rodolfo Corselli, a journalist and essayist on military arts; while her grandfather was Lieutenant of the Royal Army Aldo Zucchi, decorated with the Gold Medal of Military Valour.

She graduated from Centro Sperimentale di Cinematografia, and the same time graduated in psychology; she was active in the world of entertainment.

She began as a model and interpreted photo comics in the magazines Cioè and Lanciostory. She also acted in commercials and temporary appearances as a valet in Che tempo che fa and Scommetiiamo che...?.

While training at the CSC, directed at that time by Lina Wertmüller, her teachers included Goliarda Sapienza and Attilio Corsini.

In 2023 she published an autobiographical book, La vicina di Zeffirelli (Zeffirelli's Neighbor), which describes the friendship she had with director Franco Zeffirelli. In 2024, the book became a bestseller,; and in 18 December 2025, it was adapted into an interactive show Le vicine di Zeffirelli into Teatro Manzoni in Rome, directed by Zucchi herself and acted by Zucchi, Benedicta Boccoli, Fanny Cadeo, Alexandra Celi, Federica Cifola, Giulia Di Quilio, Daniela Fazzolari, Antonella Ponziani, Andrea Di Bella.

== Private life ==
Gaia has a brother and a sister, Marco and Simona. She was married to film producer Francesco Papa, and they had Leonardo, who also became a producer.

Later, she had a relationship with record producer Tullio Mattone; they remain good friends.

She also had a relationship with the Neapolitan entrepreneur Massimo Mignano, with whom she had her daughter Mia.

== Career highlights ==
=== Film ===
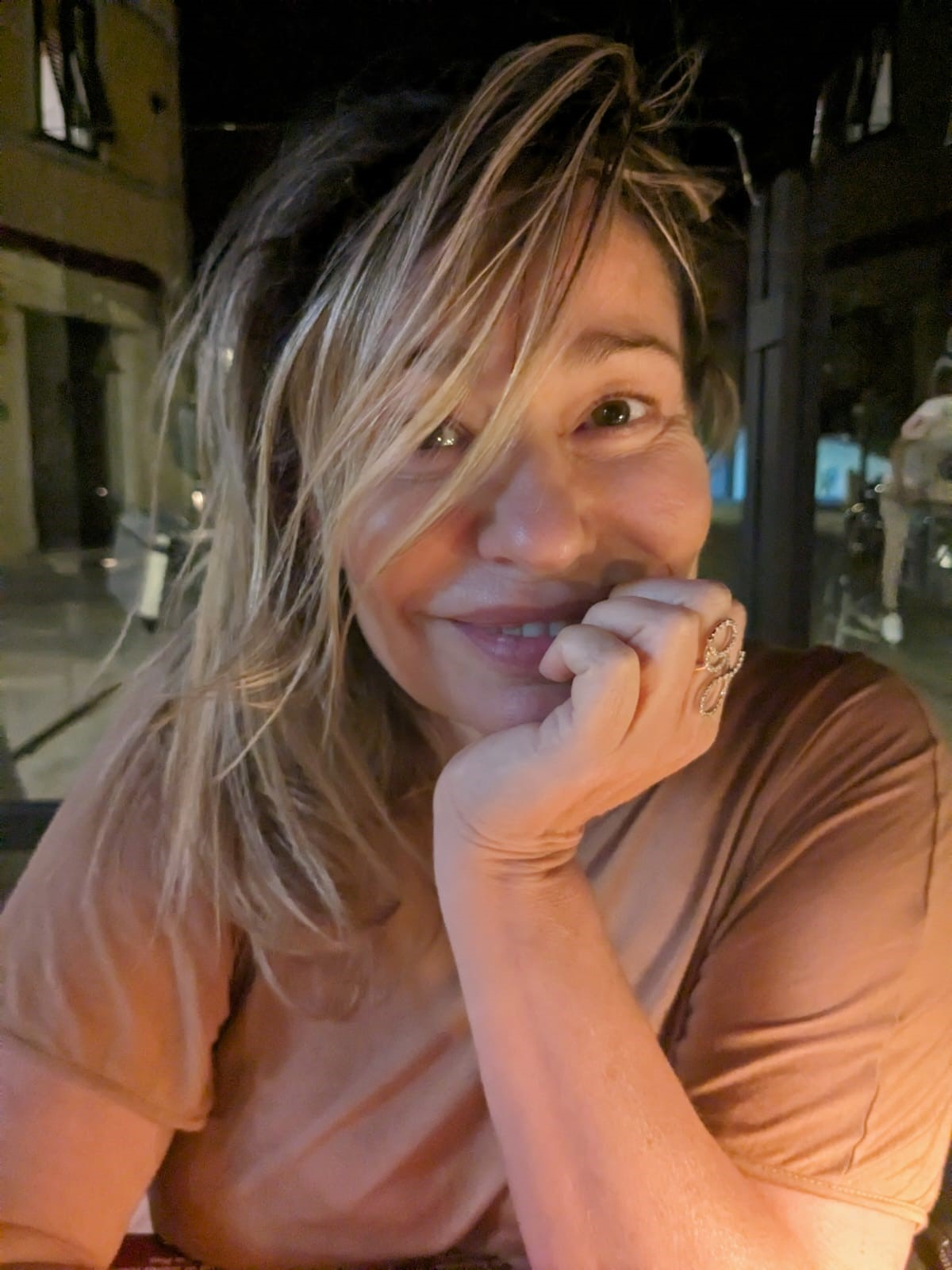
Gaia Zucchi, in Pisa, september 2023.

- Plagio (1989), dir. Cinzia TH Torrini
- Nessuno mi crede (1992), dir. Anna Carlucci
- Est (1993) (short), dir. F. Brizzi
- Caso Wanderbit (1994) (short), dir. N. Nimica
- Muccino Muccina (1994) (short), dir. G. Petitto
- Peggio di così si muore (1995), dir. Marcello Cesena
- Fermo posta Tinto Brass (1995), dir. Tinto Brass
- Bits and Pieces (1996), dir. Antonello Grimaldi
- Il tocco: la sfida (1997), dir. Enrico Coletti
- I volontari (1998), dir. D. Costanzo
- Per sempre (2003), dir. Alessandro Di Robilant
- Carrozzelle felici (2003) (short), dir. Walter Garibaldi
- Rabbia in pugno (2012), dir. Stefano Calvagna
- Come un fiore (2023) (short), dir. Benedicta Boccoli
- Jerry e Tom (2023), dir. Gianluca Ansanelli

=== Theater ===
- La crisi del teatro (1994), dir. A. Corsini
- Marasade (1996), dir. M. Garroni
- Voglia matta - anni 60 (1995 - 1997), dir. A. Corsini
- Gente soprattutto matta (1997), dir. D. Formica
- Voglia matta - anni 50 (1998), dir. A. Corsini
- Voglia matta di Roma (1999), dir. A. Corsini
- La bottega del caffè (2000), dir. M. Belli
- La giornata d'uno scrutatore (2003), dir. Luca Ronconi

=== Television ===
- Papà prende moglie (1993)
- La signora della città (1996), dir. B. Cino
- Tutti gli uomini sono uguali (1998), dir. A. Capone
- Turbo (1999), dir. A. Bonifacio
- La Squadra (2003)
- Carabinieri (2004-2005), dir. R. Mertes
- Distretto di Polizia (2005), dir. Monica Vullo
- Camera Cafè (2005)
- Prenditi cura di Me (2022) (Otto Channel Tv) dir. Andrea Bocchino

== Publications ==
- La vicina di Zeffirelli; De Nigris Editori, Napoli, Italy.

== Awards ==
- 2026 : Italy: Saint John Paul II International Award, Ambassador of Peace, for her commitment to social causes, culture, and the protection of human rights.;;
