= Pietralata =

Pietralata may refer to:

- Pietralata (Rome), the 21st quarter of Rome
- Pietralata (Rome Metro), a station on Line B of the Rome Metro
- Pietralata (film), a 2008 Italian film
