= Tutti gli uomini sono uguali =

- Genre: Comedy
- Created by: Alessandro Capone
- Starring: Enzo Decaro; Massimo Wertmüller; Maurizio Crozza; Randi Ingerman
- Country of origin: Italy
- No. of seasons: 1
- No. of episodes: 7

Original release
- Network: Italia 1
- Release: 1997

Tutti gli uomini sono uguali is an Italian comedy television series.

== Cast ==
- Enzo De Caro: Claudio
- Massimo Wertmüller: Giacomo Sacchetti
- Maurizio Crozza: Martino
- Randi Ingerman: Alison
- Francesco Salvi: psichiatra
- Alessandra Casella: Silvana
- Mariangela D'Abbraccio: Penelope
- Sabrina Salerno: Vittoria
- Gaia Zucchi

== See also ==
- List of Italian television series
