= Massimo Bonetti =

Italian actor and director

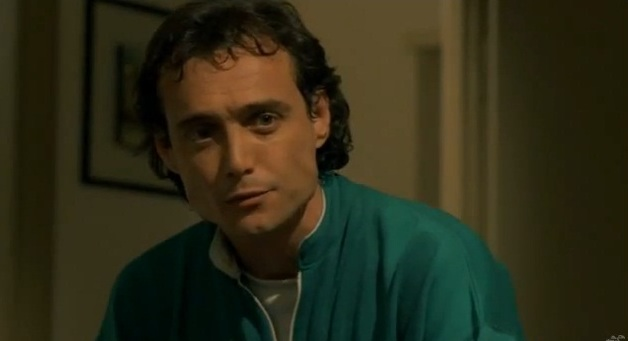
- Massimo Bonetti in 1987
- Born: 28 March 1951 (age 74); Rome, Italy
- Occupation: Actor
- Height: 1.80 m (5 ft 11 in)

Massimo Bonetti (born 28 March 1951) is an Italian actor and director.

== Life and career ==
Born in Rome, Bonetti after several years as character actor debuted in a leading role in 1981, in Aurelio Chiesa's Bim Bum Bam. Then, he obtained roles of weight for notable directors such as Paolo and Vittorio Taviani, Pupi Avati and Massimo Troisi. He is also very active in Italian television, in which he is probably best known for the main role in the crime TV-series La squadra, that he starred for eight seasons between 1999 and 2007.

In 2010 Bonetti made his directorial debut with Quando si Diventa Grandi.

== Selected filmography ==
- Free Hand for a Tough Cop (1976)
- Beach House (1977)
- The Cynic, the Rat and the Fist (1977)
- Stay as You Are (1978)
- The Night of the Shooting Stars (1982)
- Kaos (1984)
- Le vie del Signore sono finite (1987)
- The Last Minute (1987)
- The Story of Boys & Girls (1989)
- The Sun Also Shines at Night (1990)
- Faccione (1991)
- Women in Arms (1991)
- Yes, Virginia, There Is a Santa Claus (1991)
- Giovanni Falcone (1993)
- Porzûs (1997)
- Notes of Love (1998)
- Maria Goretti (2003)
- Pietralata (2008)
- The Youngest Son (2010)
- The Big Heart of Girls (2011)
- You Can't Save Yourself Alone (2015)
- Everything Calls for Salvation (2022)
- The American Backyard (2024)
