= Sanremo Music Festival 1999 =

Italian song contest (49th edition)

Dates and venue
- Semi-final 1: 23 February 1999
- Semi-final 2: 24 February 1999
- Semi-final 3: 25 February 1999
- Semi-final 4: 26 February 1999
- Final: 27 February 1999
- Venue: Teatro Ariston; Sanremo, Italy

Organisation
- Broadcaster: Radiotelevisione italiana (RAI)
- Musical director: Gianfranco Lombardi
- Artistic director: Fabio Fazio
- Presenters: Fabio Fazio and Laetitia Casta, Renato Dulbecco

Big Artists section
- Number of entries: 14
- Winner: "Senza pietà" Anna Oxa

Newcomers' section
- Winner: "Oggi sono io" Alex Britti

The Sanremo Music Festival 1999 (Italian: Festival di Sanremo 1999), officially the 49th Italian Song Festival (49º Festival della canzone italiana), was the 49th annual Sanremo Music Festival, held at the Teatro Ariston in Sanremo between 23 and 27 February 1999 and broadcast by Radiotelevisione italiana (RAI). The show was presented by Fabio Fazio (who also served as the artistic director), supported by Laetitia Casta and Renato Dulbecco.

The quality jury consisted of Ennio Morricone (who served as president), Umberto Bindi, Toquinho, Carlo Verdone, José Carreras, Maurizio De Angelis, Enrico Brizzi, Amadeus and Dario Salvatori. The winner of the Big Artists section was Anna Oxa with the song "Senza pietà", while Daniele Silvestri won the Critics Award with the song "Aria".Alex Britti won the "Newcomers" section with the song "Oggi sono io". In this edition, the "Premio Città di Sanremo", a career award, was introduced, being won by Ornella Vanoni.

In addition to musical guests, the guests of this edition also included Mikhail Gorbachev, Neil Armstrong and Buzz Aldrin, Michael Moore, Leslie Nielsen, Gustav Thöni, Silvan, Darlene Conley, Roberto Mancini, Alessandro Del Piero, Carla Fracci, Pierluigi Collina and Teo Teocoli.

After every night Rai 1 broadcast DopoFestival, a talk show about the Festival with the participation of singers and journalists. It was hosted by Orietta Berti and Teo Teocoli, with the regular participation of Fabio Fazio.

== Participants and results ==
=== Big Artists ===
Big Artists section
Song	Artist(s)	Songwriter(s)	Rank	Notes
"Senza pietà"	Anna Oxa	Alberto Salerno; Claudio Guidetti	1	Winner of the "Big Artists" section
"Non ti dimentico (se non ci fossero le nuvole)"	Antonella Ruggiero	Antonella Ruggiero; Kaballà; Roberto Colombo	2	Volare Award for Best Music tied
"Così è la vita"	Mariella Nava	Mariella Nava	3	Volare Award for Best Music tied
"Alberi"	Enzo Gragnaniello & Ornella Vanoni	Enzo Gragnaniello	4	
"Lo zaino"	Stadio	Vasco Rossi; Gaetano Curreri	5	
"Ancora in volo"	Albano Carrisi	Massimo Bizzarri; Pino Marcucci e Albano Carrisi	6	
"Un inverno da baciare"	Marina Rei	Marina Rei; Davide Pinelli	7	
"Senza giacca e cravatta"	Nino D'Angelo	Nino D'Angelo; Carmine Tortora	8	
"Aria"	Daniele Silvestri	Daniele Silvestri	9	Mia Martini Critics Award; Volare Award for Best Lyrics
"Guardami negli occhi"	Nada	Nada	10	
"Amami Lara"	Eugenio Finardi	Eugenio Finardi; Edoardo Bechis; Fabrizio Consoli	11	
"Dove dov’è"	Gatto Panceri	Gatto Panceri	12	
"Il giorno perfetto"	Gianluca Grignani	Gianluca Grignani	13	
"Come sei bella"	Massimo Di Cataldo	Massimo Di Cataldo	14	

=== Newcomers ===
Newcomers section
Song	Artist(s)	Songwriter(s)	Rank	Notes
"Oggi sono io"	Alex Britti	Alex Britti	1	Winner of the Newcomers' section
"Un giorno in più"	Filippa Giordano	Adelio Cogliati; Steve Galante; Vincenzo Thoma	2	
"Un fiume in piena"	Leda Battisti	Leda Battisti	3	
"C’è che ti amo"	Arianna	Valeriano Chiaravalle; Arianna Bergamaschi	4	
"Adesso"	Daniele Groff	Daniele Groff	5	
"Nessuno può fermare questo tempo"	Elena Cataneo	Stefano Cenci; Roberto Zappalorto	6	
"Ti amo che strano"	Francesca Chiara	Mauro Spina; Francesca Chiara Casellati; Tank Palamara	7	
"Una musica può fare"	Max Gazzè	Max Gazzè; Francesco Gazzè	8	
"Puoi fidarti di me"	Allegra	Allegra Lusini	9	
"Noi non ci capiamo"	Soerba	Luca Urbani; Gabriele D'Amora	10	
"Rospo"	Quintorigo	M. De Leonardis; V. Bianchi; S. Ricci; A. Costa; G. Costa	11	Winner of the Mia Martini Critics Award - Newcomers' section; Volare Award for Best Arrangement
"Little Darling"	Boris	Alessandro Baldinotti; Giulia Fasolino; Boris; Paolo Hollesch	12	
"Al centro del mondo"	Dr. Livingstone	Andrea Bove	13	
"Quando lei non c’è"	Irene Lamedica	Irene Lamedica; Steve Lucarelli; Roberto Baldi	14	

== Musical guests ==
Guests
Artist(s)	Song(s)
Cher	"Believe"
Blur	"Tender"
Gianni Morandi	"Lasciarsi per amore" "Vita"
Skunk Anansie	"Charlie Big Potato"
Five	"Everybody Get Up"
Ivano Fossati	"Mio fratello che guardi il mondo" "Una notte in Italia"
Riccardo Cocciante	"Margherita"
R.E.M.	"Daysleeper" "Lotus"
Emilia Rydberg	"Big Big World"
Franco Battiato	"Shock in My Town" "Vite parallele" "Il mantello e la spiga"
Ricky Martin	"Maria" "La Bomba" "La copa de la vida"
Lenny Kravitz	"Thinking of You"
Mariah Carey	"I Still Believe"
Alanis Morissette	"Joining You"
