= Fermo posta Tinto Brass =

1995 film by Tinto Brass

- Directed by: Tinto Brass
- Screenplay by: Tinto Brass; Aurelio Grimaldi; Claudio lizza
- Story by: Tinto Brass
- Produced by: Giovanni Bertolucci; Massimo Ferrero
- Starring: Tinto Brass; Cinzia Roccaforte
- Cinematography: Dante Dalla Torre
- Edited by: Tinto Brass
- Music by: Riz Ortolani
- Production company: California Film
- Release date: 30 August 1995
- Running time: 94 minutes
- Country: Italy
- Language: Italian

Fermo posta Tinto Brass is a 1995 Italian comedy film-erotic film directed by Tinto Brass and set in vignettes. The film is said to belong to a second era in Brass's work (from 1983 until 1999), characterized by an obsessive use of cartoonish erotic figures.

It was created from the content of actual letters Brass received regarding his film Cosi fan tutte (1992) and the director stated: "I filmed the stories that I received from all these women that approved of the message of my film."

== Premise ==
Tinto Brass and his secretary Lucia are in the Venice office of the director. Lucia reads letters (one accompanied by a videocassette) sent to Brass by seven of his female fans from around Italy and they reflect on these women's sexual fantasies. Tinto Brass uses his own name and is mentioned as an erotic film master.

== Cast ==
- Tinto Brass as Himself
- Cinzia Roccaforte as Lucia, Secretary of Tinto Brass
- Laura Gualtieri as Milena, Dario's Fiancee and writer of first letter
- Erika Savastani as Elena (Michelle) -Guido's Wife and writer of second letter
- Paolo Lanza as Carlo and Guido, Elena's Husband
- Alessandra Antonelli as Betta, woman in Ruins and writer of third letter
- Carla Solaro as Francesca and writer of fourth letter
- Cristina Rinaldi as Ivana
- Sara Cosmi as Sofia, Elena's Prostitute Friend
- Gaia Zucchi as Renata / Piero's Wife
- Gabriella Barbuti as Rossella
- Laura Gualtieri
- Claudia Biagiotti as Maria
- Luca Flauto
- Pascal Persiano as Paolo
- Gianni De Martiis
- Andrea Scataglini
- Ghibly F. Lombardi
- Maurizio Prudenzi as Francesca's Swap Partner
- Cristian Marazziti
- Susanna Bugatti as girl in videotape
- Anita Divizia as girl came to audition
- Stefania Corradetti
- Sabrina Romeo
- Laura Paparesta
