= Palazzolo sull'Oglio =

- Comune
- Città di Palazzolo sull'Oglio
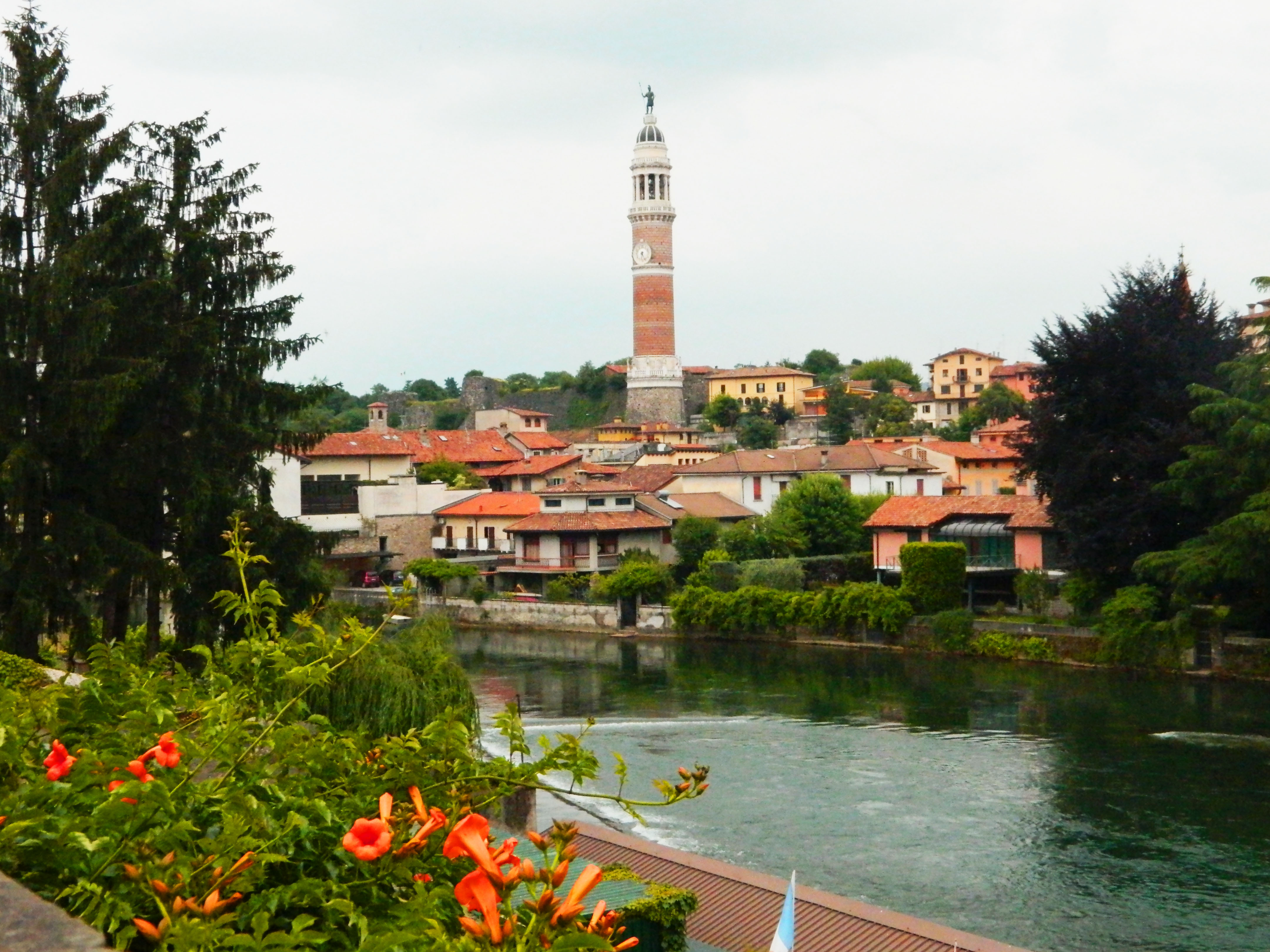
- View of the city centre.

- Coat of arms

- Location within Italy Location within Lombardy
- Coordinates: 45°36′N 9°53′E
- Country: Italy
- Region: Lombardy
- Province: Brescia (BS)
- Frazioni: San Pancrazio

Government
  - Mayor: Gianmarco Cossandi (PD)

Area
  - Total: 23.04 km^{2} (8.90 sq mi)
- Elevation: 170 m (560 ft)

Population (30 April 2022)
  - Total: 19,883
  - Density: 863.0/km^{2} (2,235/sq mi)
- Demonym: Palazzolesi
- Time zone: UTC+1 (CET)
  - Summer (DST): UTC+2 (CEST)
- Postal code: 25036
- Dialing code: 030
- Patron saint: San Fedele
- Saint day: 14 May
- Website: Official website

Palazzolo sull'Oglio (Brescian and Bergamasque: Palasöl; locally Palahöl) is a city and comune in the Province of Brescia, in the region of Lombardy in northern Italy. It is located south of Lake Iseo, bordering the Province of Bergamo, and has a population of 20,208. It is the fifth largest city in the Province, after Brescia, Desenzano del Garda, Montichiari and Lumezzane.

== History ==
The town was founded on the banks of the river Oglio. The first references to the name "Palazzolo" date to 830 AD. Palazzolo was a fundamental industrial centre of Italy at the end of the 19th century (Marzoli, Lanfranchi, Italcementi, Ferrari) and the city was known as the small Italian Manchester. On 24 August 1954, the town was celebrated as a city with a presidential decree. The Tower of the People, the symbol of the city, was built between 1813 and 1830 and today is the highest round tower in Italy, 85 metres high and 7 metres of statue on top. The Roman bridge, in the city centre, is the oldest building of Palazzolo, dating back to the 4th century.

== Main sights ==
- The Tower of the People (Torre del Popolo).
- The Castle.
- The Roman Bridge.
- The Ancient Pieve (Antica Pieve).
- The Main Church (Chiesa di Santa Maria Assunta).
- The three Kupfer villas (Le ville Kupfer).

== Transport ==
From Palazzolo, it is very easy to get to the main cities and towns throughout Italy. The train station is not far from the centre and operates on the Bergamo–Brescia railway. Milan and Venice can be reached by train changing in Bergamo or in Brescia. The A4 motorway, an important Italian route, has an exit called Palazzolo, which is actually in the north of the town. The nearest International Airport is Orio al Serio International Airport, just 15 minutes by car.

== Sports ==
Founded in 1913, the football association for the town is Associazione Calcio Palazzolo (Palazzolo Football Association). They play in the local stadium, Stadio Comunale, which holds up to 4,500 people.

== People ==
- Durante Duranti, cardinal and bishop (16th century)
- Paolo Gorini, scientist
- Maurizio Belpietro, journalist and television presenter
- Luisa Corna, singer and TV presenter
- Irene Fargo, singer
