= Ciao Brother =

- Film poster
- Directed by: Nicola Barnaba
- Produced by: Gianluca Curti per Minerva Film
- Starring: Fabrizio Nardi; Benedicta Boccoli; Mietta; David Zed
- Release date: June 9, 2016
- Running time: 90 minutes
- Country: Italy
- Language: Italian

Ciao Brother (Italian: Ciao Brother) is a 2016 Italian film directed by Nicola Barnaba.

== Plot ==
The film concerns about Angelo, who is a swindler who escapes to Los Angeles.

== Cast ==
- Fabrizio Nardi: Angelo
- Nico Di Renzo: George
- Benedicta Boccoli: Patricia
- Francesca Della Ragione: Alyssa
- Clayton Norcross: Mr. Cullinhan
- Mietta: Claire
- Emanuela Aurizi: Manila
- Ami Veevers Chorlton: Miss Brandy
- Massimo Ceccherini: Taxi driver
- Roberto Ciufoli: Private detective
- David Zed: Lawyer Welles
