= Alex Britti =

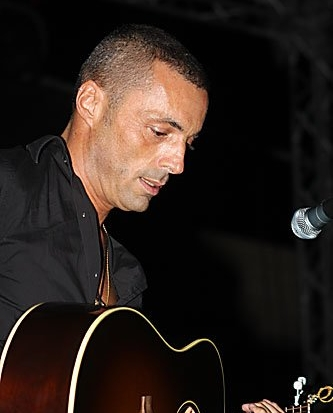

Background information
- Born: 23 August 1968 (age 58); Rome, Italy
- Genres: Pop; rock; blues; Italian singer-songwriter
- Occupations: Singer; songwriter; guitarist
- Instruments: Vocals; guitar; keyboards; violin
- Years active: 1998–present
- Labels: Universal; It.Pop
- Website: www.alexbritti.com

Alessandro "Alex" Britti (born 23 August 1968) is an Italian singer-songwriter and guitarist.

== Biography ==
When he was 17, he started his first band, playing blues at clubs in Rome, and eventually moved to Milan. In 1989, he established the Alex Britti Blues Band. He has worked with Buddy Miles, Billy Preston, Louisiana Red and has toured Europe with Rosa King.

In the mid-1990s, he toured with Francesco De Gregori. The experience prompted Britti to switch to a more soft rock-oriented sound. He had his first hit in 1998 when "Solo una volta (o tutta la vita)" made it to the top of the Italian charts. In 1999, he won in the newcomers category at the Sanremo Festival with the song "Oggi sono io".

== Discography ==
=== Albums ===
- 1998 - It.Pop
- 2000 - La vasca
- 2003 - Tre
- 2005 - Festa
- 2008 - Alex Britti MTV Unplugged
- 2009 - .23
- 2013 - Bene così
- 2015 – In nome dell'amore - Volume 1
- 2017 – In nome dell'amore - Volume 2
- 2022 – Mojo

=== Singles ===
- 1998 - "Solo una volta (o tutta la vita)"
- 1998 - "Gelido"
- 1999 - "Oggi sono io"
- 1999 - "Mi piaci"
- 2000 - "Una su 1.000.000"
- 2000 - "La vasca"
- 2001 - "Sono contento"
- 2003 - "7000 caffè"
- 2003 - "La vita sognata"
- 2003 - "Lo zingaro felice"
- 2005 - "Prendere o lasciare"
- 2006 - "Festa"
- 2006 - "Quanto ti amo"
- 2006 - "Solo con te"
- 2006 - "Notte di mezza estate"
- 2008 - "Milano"
- 2008 - "L'isola che non c'è"
- 2009 - "Piove"
- 2009 - "Buona fortuna"
- 2011 - "Immaturi"
- 2013 - "Baciami (e portami a ballare)"
- 2013 - "Bene così"
- 2014 - "Non è vero mai" (Bianca Atzei ft. Alex Britti)
- 2015 - "Ciao amore, ciao" (Bianca Atzei ft. Alex Britti)
- 2015 - "Perché?"
