= Irene Fargo =

Italian singer and actress (1962–2022)

- Fargo in 1992
- Born: Flavia Irene Pozzaglio; 1 November 1962; Palazzolo sull'Oglio, Italy
- Died: 1 July 2022 (aged 59); Brescia, Italy
- Occupations: Singer, stage actress, television personality
- Notable work: La donna di Ibsen (1991); Come una Turandot (1992)

Irene Fargo (born Flavia Irene Pozzaglio; 1 November 1962 – 1 July 2022) was an Italian singer, stage actress, and television personality.

== Life and career ==
Fargo was born as Flavia Pozzaglio in Palazzolo sull'Oglio, Brescia. She started singing as a child, and at just 11 years old she entered the Polyphonic Choir of the city of Chiari. In 1989, she participated at the Castrocaro Music Festival, with the song "Le donne dei soldati veri".

Fargo was best known for her two second places at the Sanremo Music Festival, in 1991 with the song "La donna di Ibsen" (whose lyrics are inspired by Henrik Ibsen's The Lady from the Sea), and in 1992 with "Come una Turandot" (inspired by Giacomo Puccini's Turandot). The songs reached the 14th and 5th places in the Italian singles hit parade, respectively. In 1993, she placed third at the Cantagiro festival. In 1994, she was cast in the popular variety show Domenica in. In the late 1990s, she was a regular guest in Paolo Limiti's television programs. Starting from the 2000s, she had main roles in several stage musicals. She was a popular singer at weddings in Malta.

Fargo died on 1 July 2022, at the age of 59 after a long illness.

== Discography ==
Album

- 1991: Irene Fargo (Carosello)
- 1992: La voce magica della luna (Carosello)
- 1993: Labirinti del cuore (Carosello)
- 1995: O core e Napule (Carosello)
- 1997: Fargo (Tring)
- 1999: Appunti di viaggio (Azzurra music)
- 1999: Va da lei (Saar)
- 2005: Insieme (Alta sintonia)
- 2009: Cartolina napoletana (Pressing music ltd)
- 2012: Crescendo (Pressing music ltd)
- 2016: Il cuore fa (Pressing music ltd)
