= Vattene amore =

Single by Amedeo Minghi & Mietta
- B-side: "Vattene amore" (Mietta solo version)
- Released: 1990
- Genre: Pop
- Label: Fonit Cetra
- Songwriters: Amedeo Minghi, Pasquale Panella, Augusto Martelli

Amedeo Minghi singles chronology
"Anni '60" (1987)	"Vattene amore" (1990)	"Nené" (1991)

Mietta singles chronology
"Canzoni" (1989)	"Vattene amore" (1990)	"Piccolissimi segreti" (1990)

Music video
- "Vattene amore" on YouTube

"Vattene amore" is a 1990 song composed by Amedeo Minghi, Pasquale Panella and Augusto Martelli and recorded in a duo performance by Mietta and Minghi. The song premiered at the 40th edition of the Sanremo Music Festival, where it placed third. During the festival, it was also performed in an English-language adaptation titled "All for the Love" by Nikka Costa.

The song was an immediate hit, topping the Italian singles chart for several weeks.

== Lyrics ==
The song is a classic piece of love, characterized by a strong vocal chiaroscurism. The text describes the difficulties of a couple separated by the numerous trips of him, using a very idiomatic language. If words were to be literally translated into a different language (like English), several non-sense could be in place.

The song has a very original and appealing melody and jingle ("dudu dadada"), which remained famous in Italy for many years especially among lovers who started referring to him as "trottolino" (that means my baby, honey, sweetheart, my dear).

== Charts ==
=== Weekly charts ===
Chart (1990)	Peak position
Italy	1
Italy Airplay (Music & Media)	3
Netherlands	76

Amedeo Minghi & Viktor Lazlo version

Chart (1993)	Peak position
Switzerland	17

=== Year-end charts ===
Chart (1990)	Position
Italy	2
