= Luisa Corna =

Italian television presenter, singer, model, and actress

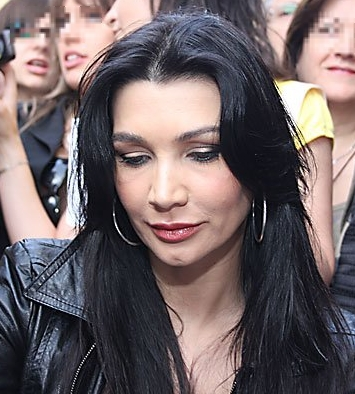
- Corna in 2008
- Born: 2 December 1965 (age 60); Palazzolo sull'Oglio, Brescia, Italy
- Occupations: Fashion model; singer; actress; TV presenter
- Height: 1.75 m (5 ft 9 in)
- Spouse: Stefano Giovino (m. 2023)

Luisa Corna (born 2 December 1965) is an Italian television presenter, singer, model, and actress.

Born in Palazzolo sull'Oglio, Brescia, at 16 years old Corna began her career as a model for, among others, Dolce & Gabbana, Missoni and Mariella Burani; she also posed for photographers Helmut Newton and Arthur Elgort. In 1992 she ranked second at the Castrocaro Music Festival with the song "Dove vanno a finire gli amori". In the late 1990s Corna began her television career, hosting several television programs such as Tira e Molla, Domenica in and Controcampo. In 2002 she entered the main competition at the Sanremo Music Festival, ranking fourth with the song "Ora che ho bisogno di te", a duet with Fausto Leali.

Corna also appeared on several films and television series, and dubbed Lola in the Italian version of the 2004 animated film Shark Tale.

== Personal life ==
She is married to Stefano Giovino, a Carabinieri officer. She identifies as Roman Catholic.
