= Mietta =

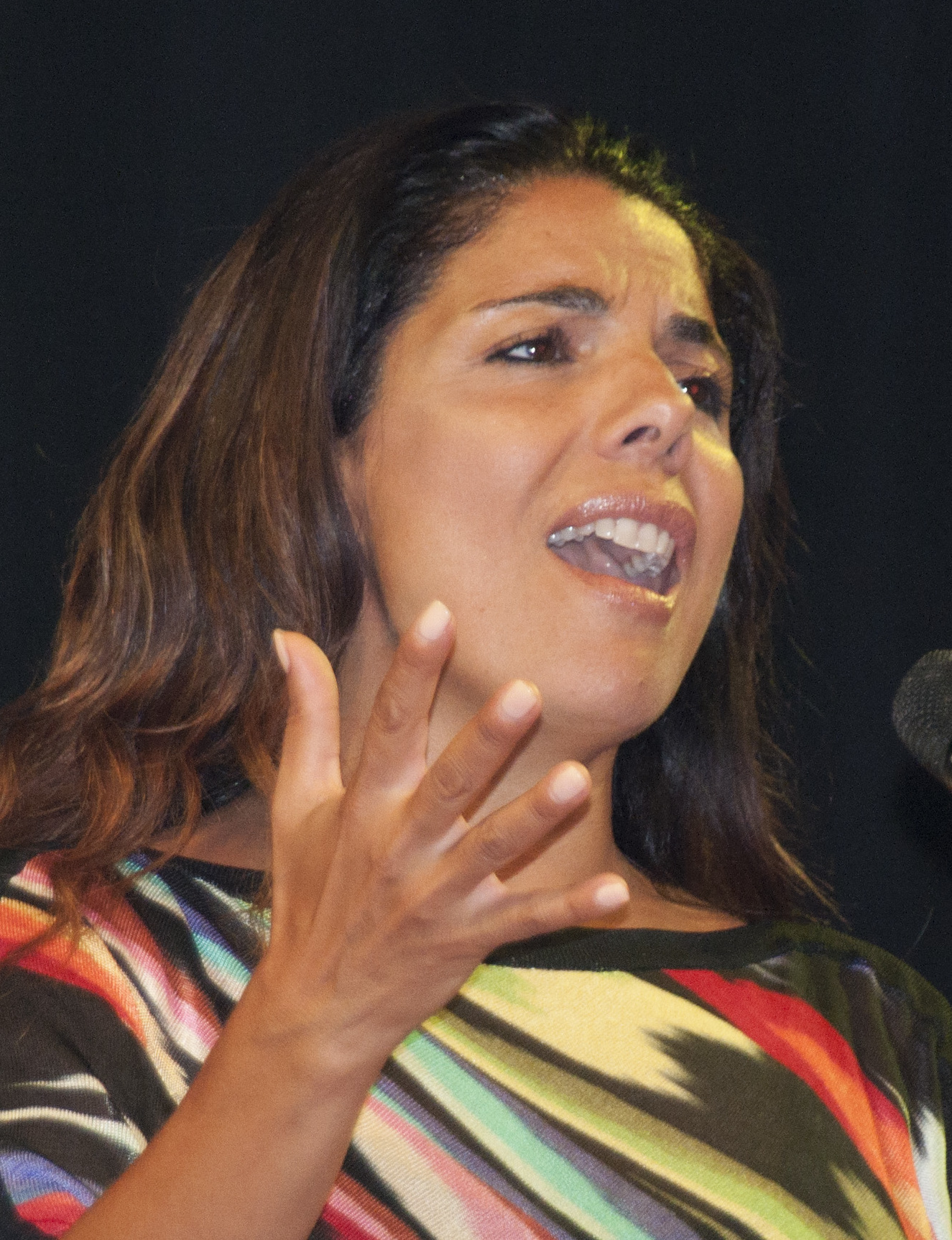
- Mietta in 2016

Background information
- Birth name: Daniela Miglietta
- Born: 12 November 1969 (age 55) Taranto, Italy
- Genres: Soul; R&B; jazz; pop rock
- Occupations: Singer; actress; author
- Years active: 1988–present
- Labels: Sony BMG; Epic Records
- Website: www.mietta.it

Daniela Miglietta (born 12 November 1969), known by her stage name Mietta, is an Italian singer, actress and novelist. She has released 11 albums in total.

== Biography ==
In 1988, Mietta took part in the Sanremo Music Festival in the Newcomers category with "Sogno". She did not win, but was noticed by the melodic songwriter Amedeo Minghi, who wrote the song "Canzoni" for her the following year. Mietta won the Newcomers category and the Critics award at the Sanremo Music Festival 1989. In the same year, she was awarded her first platinum certification and the Telegatto for Best New Artist of 1989, with the support of votes from Italians.

In 1990, she duetted with Amedeo Minghi the song "Vattene amore", which won third place in the Sanremo Festival and has been interpreted into English "All for the Love" by Nikka Costa. The song also won the OGAE, an international song contest, and became an evergreen, winning ten gold certifications. Her debut album, also entitled Canzoni, went five times platinum and was published throughout Europe. In 1990, she again won two Telegattos: one for Song of the Year and the other award for Best Female Artist of the Year.

Mietta returned to The Sanremo Festival in 1991 with "Dubbi no", sung in English by Leo Sayer, and won another Telegatto for Female Artist of the Year. Her second album Volano le pagine, which contains a cover version of "Lover Man", won two platinum certifications.

In 1992, she released the albumLasciamoci respirare and in 1994 "Cambia pelle", besides two duets with Riccardo Cocciante ( "E pensare che pensavo mi pensassi almeno un po'" and "Sulla tua pelle") from his album Un Uomo Felice. She once again took part in Sanremo with "Figli di chi", written by Nek.

In 1995, Mietta continued with musical experimentation, tackling different types of music, from soul to blues, from hip hop to the trip hop album Daniela è felice. Her music video for "Oggi Dani è più felice" won the MTV Award in England as Best Foreign Video of the Year.

In 1996, she performed the speaking and singing voice of Esmeralda in the Italian-Language dub of The Hunchback of Notre Dame, but was later replaced by Franca D'Amato in the less successful 2002 direct-to-video sequel. She soon appeared in Zucchero's video "Menta e rosmarino" and later debuted as an actress in La piovra, which was a popular Italian series.

In 1998 she was back to music with La mia anima, an album with cover songs of popular black music. In 2000, she again took part in the Sanremo Festival with "Fare l'amore", a song composed by Mango and included in her first greatest hits album Tutto o niente.

In 2002, she got a new role for dramatic actress in the TV film Donne di mafia. Electro-pop and arabesque sounds for the 2003 album Per esempio... per amore, produced and written by Mango.

In 2004, she performed a duet with Morris Albert in Sanremo Festival with "Cuore" and in 2005 she participated in a talent show hosted by Simona Ventura, titled Music Farm.

In 2006, after the R&B single "Bugiarda", she released the pop-rock album 74100, which is the postal code of Mietta's native city of Taranto. The album also featured songwriters such as Martin Briley and Deekay.

In 2008 Mietta celebrated her 20th anniversary as an artist, returning for the 8th time at the Sanremo Music Festival with Baciami adesso, a song included in the album Con il sole nelle mani.

In 2011, after becoming a mother for the first time, Mietta returned to the music scene with a new album dedicated to human frailty entitled Due soli.... The album, positioned between pop and rock, features tributes to two women: Marilyn Monroe and Sakineh Mohammadi Ashtiani. In the same year she debuted as a novelist with her first novel about women, L'albero delle giuggiole, and narrated the audiobook L'ultimo elfo, a fantasy written by Silvana De Mari. She also participated as a mentor for the talent show Star Academy Italia. In 2012, she participated in the talent show Tale e quale show, the Italian version of the Your Face Sounds Familiar franchise, where she did an imitation of Donna Summer, Jennifer Lopez and Maria Callas.

In 2016, Mietta returned to acting in two films: Ciao Brother and La fuga. In 2017, she released two new singles with the jazz band Marea: "Semplice" and the cover "Historia de un amor".

== Discography ==
- Canzoni, 1990
- Volano le pagine, 1991
- Lasciamoci respirare, 1992
- Cambia pelle, 1994
- Daniela è felice, 1995
- La mia anima, 1998
- Tutto o niente, 2000
- Per esempio... per amore, 2003
- 74100, 2006
- Con il sole nelle mani, 2008
- Due soli..., 2011

== Covers ==
- Lover Man of Sarah Vaughan / Billie Holiday, 1991
- Just the Two of Us (Dentro l'anima) of Bill Withers / Grover Washington Jr., 1995
- Watch Your Step (Un passo falso) of Anita Baker, 1998
- Hot Stuff (Musica che scoppia) of Donna Summer, 1998
- The Tracks of My Tears (Una strada per te) of Smokey Robinson and The Miracles/ Mica Paris / Aretha Franklin / Johnny Rivers, 1998
- We All Need Love (Angeli noi) of Double You, 1998
- Body Talk (Battito) of Imagination, 1998
- Second Time Around (Ancora Insieme a Te) of Shalamar, 2000

== Filmography ==
=== Films ===
Year	Title	Role	Notes
1996	The Hunchback of Notre Dame	Esmeralda (voice)	Italian voice-over role
2002	Joy - Scherzi di gioia	Gas station worker	Cameo appearance
2016	Ciao Brother	Claire	
2017	La fuga	Scaragara	
2018	Stato di ebbrezza	Rosa	

=== Television ===
Year	Title	Role	Notes
1997	La priovra 8 - Lo scandalo	Rosaria Albanese Favignana	Miniseries
1999	L'ispettore Giusti	Agent Caterina Foglia	Main role; 6 episodes
2001	Donne di mafia	Cosima Sorrentino	Miniseries
2005	Music Farm	Contestant	Talent show (season 3)
2009	Amiche per l'Abruzzo	Performer	Concert special
2011	Star Academy	Judge	Talent show (season 1)
2012	Tale e quale show	Contestant	Variety show (season 1)
2013	I migliori anni	Contestant	Game show (season 6)
2018	Sanremo Young	Judge	Talent show (season 1)
2019–2020	All Together Now	Judge	Talent show (season 2)
2021	Il cantante mascherato	Contestant	Variety show (season 2)

== Audiobooks ==
- 2011: L'ultimo elfo, written by Silvana De Mari
- 2015: Come l'ortica, written by Cristina Romano

== Novels ==
- 2011: L'albero delle giuggiole
- 2017: Tra l'acqua e l'olio
