= Gaio Chiocchio =

Italian composer and singer-songwriter

- Born: 25 May 1954; Rio de Janeiro, Brazil
- Died: 28 July 1996 (aged 42); Rome, Italy
- Occupation(s): Lyricist; Producer

Gaio Chiocchio (25 May 1954 – 28 July 1996) was a Brazilian-born Italian lyricist, record producer, composer, and singer-songwriter.

== Life and career ==
Born in Rio de Janeiro, Chiocchio was the nephew of the musicians and composers Oscar and Umberto Chiocchio. In 1974 he started his professional career co-founding the progressive band Pierrot Lunaire, where he served as composer, vocalist, guitarist and sitarist. After the group disbanded, Chiocchio became producer and artistic director of the record company IT, and collaborated with the label Una sors coniunxit.

In 1980, Chiocchio released his first solo work as singer-songwriter, the EP Londra, which was followed by the single "Piccolo fuso" and by a tour with Mario Castelnuovo, Marco Ferradini and Goran Kuzminac. In 1981, he started a 6 years-collaboration as a lyricist with Amedeo Minghi. Their songs of the time, notably "1950", received large critical acclaim. Since 1987, he collaborated with other artists, including Riccardo Cocciante and Paola Turci.

In 1989 Chiocchio collaborated with a multimedia project, Il Poliedro di Leonardo, which was screened as a Special Event at the 46th Venice International Film Festival. He died of heart failure on 28 July 1996, aged 42 years old.
