= Papà prende moglie =

- Directed by: Nini Salerno
- Country of origin: Italy
- No. of seasons: 1
- No. of episodes: 8

Original release
- Network: Canale 5
- Release: 1993

Papà prende moglie is an Italian comedy television series. The title means Dad takes a wife.

== Cast ==
- Marco Columbro: Andrea Marchi
- Nancy Brilli: Francesca Banfi
- Myriam Catania: Sara Marchi
- Simone Cipelletti: Riccardo Marchi
- Nini Salerno: Giovanni
- Marco Vivio: Giuseppe
- Franca Valeri: Andrea's Mother
- Erika Blanc: Francesca's Mother
- Gaia Zucchi

== See also ==
- List of Italian television series
