= 1950 (Amedeo Minghi song) =

Single by Amedeo Minghi

from the album 1950
- B-side: "Sottomarino"
- Released: 1983
- Length: 4:36
- Label: RCA
- Composer: Amedeo Minghi
- Lyricist: Gaio Chiocchio

Amedeo Minghi singles chronology
"Qualcuno" (1981)	"1950" (1983)	"Flash back" (1984)

audio
- "1950" on YouTube

"1950" (also spelled by its Italian reading "Millenovecentocinquanta") is a 1983 song composed by Gaio Chiocchio (lyrics) and Amedeo Minghi (music) and performed by Amedeo Minghi.

== Background ==
The song was Amedeo Minghi's entry for the 33th edition of the Sanremo Music Festival, where it was eliminated; its exclusion from the finals led the festival artistic director Gianni Ravera to publicly complain about the voting mechanism (which was eventually changed the following year) and to suggest the possible re-introduction of a recovery commission for high-quality eliminated songs (as it existed in the 1960s). Despite its poor outcome at the festival, "1950" received critical acclaim and during the years proved to be one of Minghi's signature songs. The popularity of the song was reinforced by the cover version recorded by Gianni Morandi as B-side of his 1985 single "Uno su mille".

The song, a love story set immediately after World War II in newly liberated Rome, has been described as "the best song of the year", "a masterpiece of refined beauty" characterized by "a great delicacy of poetic tones [...] that strike the heart with elegance" and "the intensity of a classically romantic melody".

== Track listing ==
No.	Title	Writer(s)	Length
1.	"1950"	Chiocchio, Minghi	4:36
2.	"Sottomarino"	Chiocchio, Minghi	3:32

== Certifications ==
Region	Certification	Certified units/sales
Italy (FIMI) Sales from 2009	Gold	50,000^{‡}
^{‡} Sales+streaming figures based on certification alone.
