= Forever (2003 film) =

- Directed by: Alessandro Di Robilant
- Written by: Maurizio Costanzo
- Cinematography: Maurizio Calvesi
- Music by: Pivio and Aldo De Scalzi
- Release date: 26 September 2003
- Country: Italy
- Language: Italian

Forever (Italian: Per sempre) is a 2003 Italian romantic drama film written and directed by Alessandro Di Robilant.

== Cast ==
- Giancarlo Giannini as Giovanni
- Francesca Neri as Sara
- Emilio Solfrizzi as Doddoli
- Elisabetta Pellini as Sabrina
- Alberto Di Stasio as Caizzi
- Sabina Vannucchi as Giovanni's wife
- Gaia Zucchi
