= Donna con te =

Single by Anna Oxa
- B-side: "Donna con te" (Instrumental)
- Released: 1990
- Genre: Pop
- Label: CBS
- Songwriters: Danilo Amerio, Luciano Boero

Anna Oxa singles chronology
| "Avrei voluto" (1989) | "Donna con te" (1990) | "Mezzo angolo di cielo" (1992) |

Audio
- "Donna con te" on YouTube

"Donna con te" ("Woman with You") is a 1990 song composed by Danilo Amerio and Luciano Boero and performed by Anna Oxa.

== Background ==
The song premiered at the 40th edition of the Sanremo Music Festival, where it was first supposed to be performed by Patty Pravo; during the rehearsals Pravo complained about the lyrics and asked major changes, and eventually refused to perform the song. After considering several replacements such as Fiordaliso, Lorella Cuccarini and Lina Sastri, Anna Oxa was eventually chosen.

During the festival, the song was also performed in a Portuguese-language adaptation by Kaoma.

== Charts ==
| Chart (1990) | Peak position |
|---|---|
| Italy (Musica e dischi) | 6 |
| Italy Airplay (Music & Media) | 2 |
