= Solo una volta (o tutta la vita) =

Single by Alex Britti

from the album It.Pop
- Released: 1998
- Length: 3:58
- Label: Universal
- Songwriter(s): Alex Britti

Alex Britti singles chronology
"Solo una volta (o tutta la vita)" (1998)	"Gelido" (1998)

Music video
- "Solo una volta (o tutta la vita)" on YouTube

"Solo una volta (o tutta la vita)" (transl. "Only once (or a lifetime)") is a single from Alex Britti's 1998 album It.Pop.

== Background ==
The tune is a post-modern Italian popular music song. It was also Britti's debut single. A Spanish promo version was released, and It.pop was released in October, 1998. In November it reached number three on the Italian pop charts. The week before Halloween it reached number two.

Notable lyrics include: C'era una volta, o forse erano due, meaning "Once upon a time, or maybe twice".

== Charts ==
=== Weekly charts ===
Chart (1998–1999)	Peak position
France (SNEP)	78
Italy Airplay (Music & Media)	9
