= Senza pietà (song) =

1999 single by Anna Oxa

Single by Anna Oxa

from the album Senza pietà
- Language: Italian
- B-side: "Che cosa dire di te"
- Released: 23 February 1999 (original release); 21 April 2018 (reissue)
- Recorded: 1998
- Genre: Pop rock
- Length: 4:42
- Label: Columbia Records; Sony Music
- Composer: Claudio Guidetti
- Lyricist: Alberto Salerno
- Producer: Fio Zanotti

Anna Oxa singles chronology
| "Come dirsi ciao" (1999) | "Senza pietà" (1999) | "Camminando camminando" (1999) |

Official music video
- "Senza pietà" on YouTube

"Senza pietà" (transl. "Mercilessly", lit. "Without mercy") is a 1999 song composed by Claudio Guidetti with lyrics by Alberto Salerno, performed by Italian singer Anna Oxa. The song won the Sanremo Music Festival 1999, reaching number 4 on the Italian charts and becoming a radio hit.

The lyrics were inspired by the war imagery portrayed in The Tartar Steppe by Dino Buzzati.

== Track listing ==
CD single, CD-maxi – Columbia 66621715, 666217 1
1. "Senza pietà" – 4:42
2. "Che cosa dire di te" – 5:07
CD single, vinyl – Sony 19075833467 (2018 reissue)
1. "Senza pietà" – 4:42
2. "Che cosa dire di te" – 5:07

== Charts ==
| Chart (1999) | Peak position |
|---|---|
| Italy (FIMI) | 4 |
| Italy (airplay) | 3 |
