= Giulia Di Quilio =

Italian actress

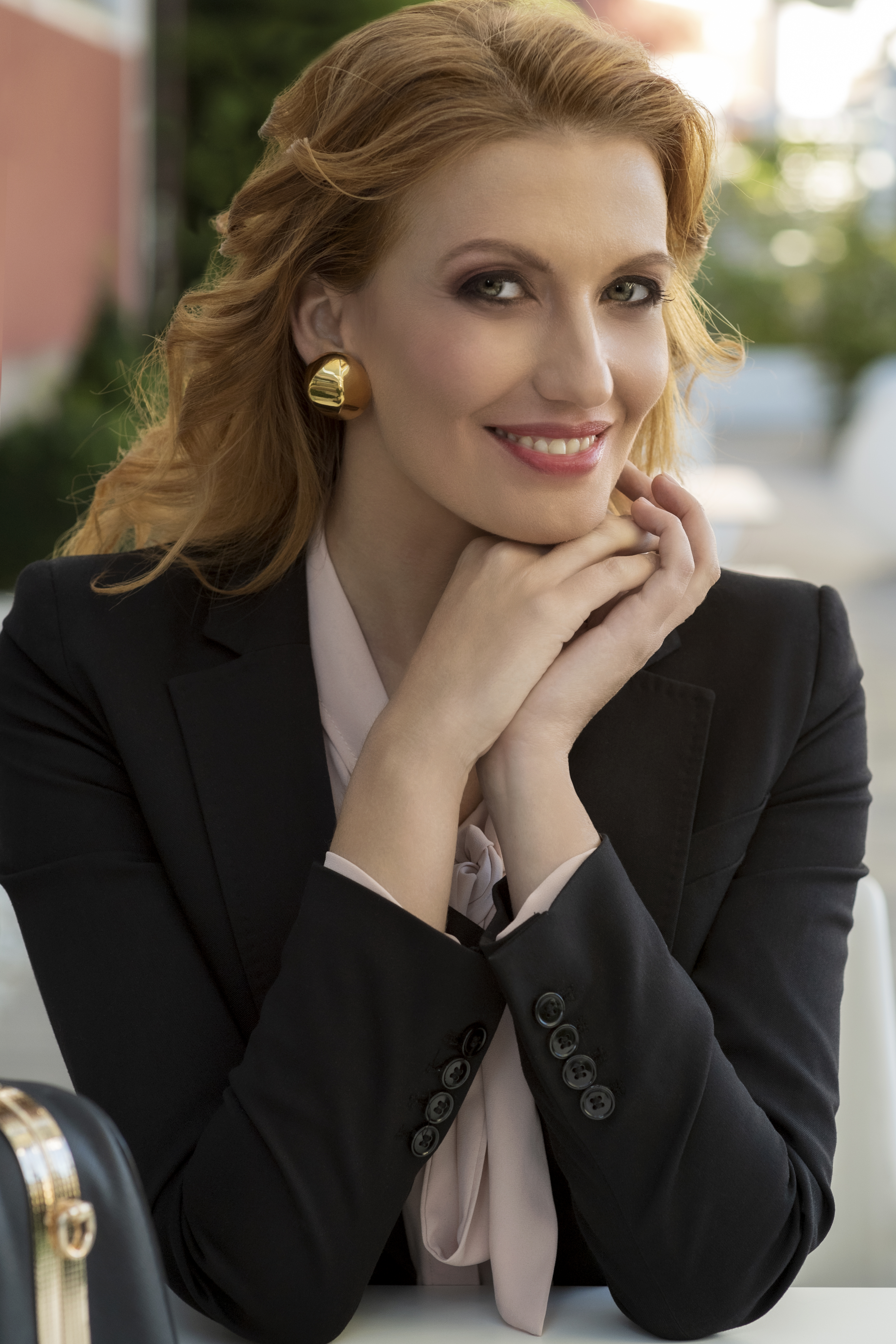
- Giulia Di Quilio
- Born: 14 November 1980 (age 45); Chieti, Italy
- Occupation: Actress
- Years active: 2005–present

Giulia Di Quilio (born 14 November 1980) is an Italian actress.

== Early life and career ==
Di Quilio moved to Rome in her adolescence to attend acting courses at Enzo Garinei's Ribalte theater laboratory. In 2005 she continued her professional training with a scholarship funded by the Lazio region for the specialization of actors for screen.

In 2011 she discovered the art of burlesque, thus starting a parallel path which led her to become one of the most recognized Italian performers in the performing art, first participating in the Sky Uno television talent broadcast Lady Burlesque (where she was one of the finalists) alongside Giampaolo Morelli. She later appeared as prima donna of the musical Burlesque Dalla foglia alla Voglia, directed by Gino Landi, staged in the spring of 2012 at the Salone Margherita (Rome), performed in major burlesque-oriented events, and at various festivals in Europe (Stockholm, Geneva, Istanbul, Nice, Berlin) and Australia (Brisbane, Melbourne, Sydney).

In 2014 Di Quilio played in the theater the role of Linda Ash, the protagonist of the theatrical adaptation of the film Mighty Aphrodite by Woody Allen, which received positive reviews.

In 2016 she published the book Eros e Burlesque for the Gremese publishing house, where she shares her experiences as a burlesque diva, together with the story of the pioneers of the art form (Gypsy Rose Lee, Lili St. Cyr, Bettie Page, etc.). The book was written under her burlesque stage name, Vesper Julie.

Di Quilio was chosen as femme fatale for the short film The Red Stain, produced by Roman Coppola for the family winery, directed by Rodrigo Savedra and premiered at the 2018 Sundance Film Festival. Also in 2018 she was among the protagonists of the comedy Non è vero ma ci credo and also appeared as a guest in Un posto al sole, playing the role of Clara Fiorito.

== Personal life ==
She is married and the mother of twins.

== Filmography ==
=== Film ===
- 13 at a Table, directed by Enrico Oldoini (2004)
- The Unknown Woman, directed by Giuseppe Tornatore (2006)
- Le ferie di Licu, directed by Vittorio Moroni (2007)
- Amore 14, directed by Federico Moccia (2009)
- The Great Beauty, directed by Paolo Sorrentino (2013)
- Mi rifaccio vivo, directed by Sergio Rubini (2013)
- Il ministro, directed by Giorgio Amato (2015)
- Non è vero ma ci credo, directed by Stefano Anselmi (2018)
- Agony, directed by Michele Civetta (2020)
- QN - Il quaderno nero dell'amore, directed by Marilù Manzini (2020)

=== Television ===
- Sottocasa, TV series (2006)
- Io non dimentico, directed by Luciano Odorisio - TV series (2007)
- I Cesaroni, directed by Francesco Vicario - TV series (2008)11
- Crimini, directed by Claudio Bonivento - TV series (2010)
- Lady Burlesque, directed by Jocelyn Hattab - TV series (2011)
- Stalk Radio, directed by Dario Cassini - TV series (2011)
- Il restauratore, directed by Giorgio Capitani - TV series (2011)
- Skin to the Max, directed by Steven Cantor - TV series (2012)
- Un posto al sole, TV series (2018)
