= Lorenza Mario =

Italian dancer, actress, and television personality

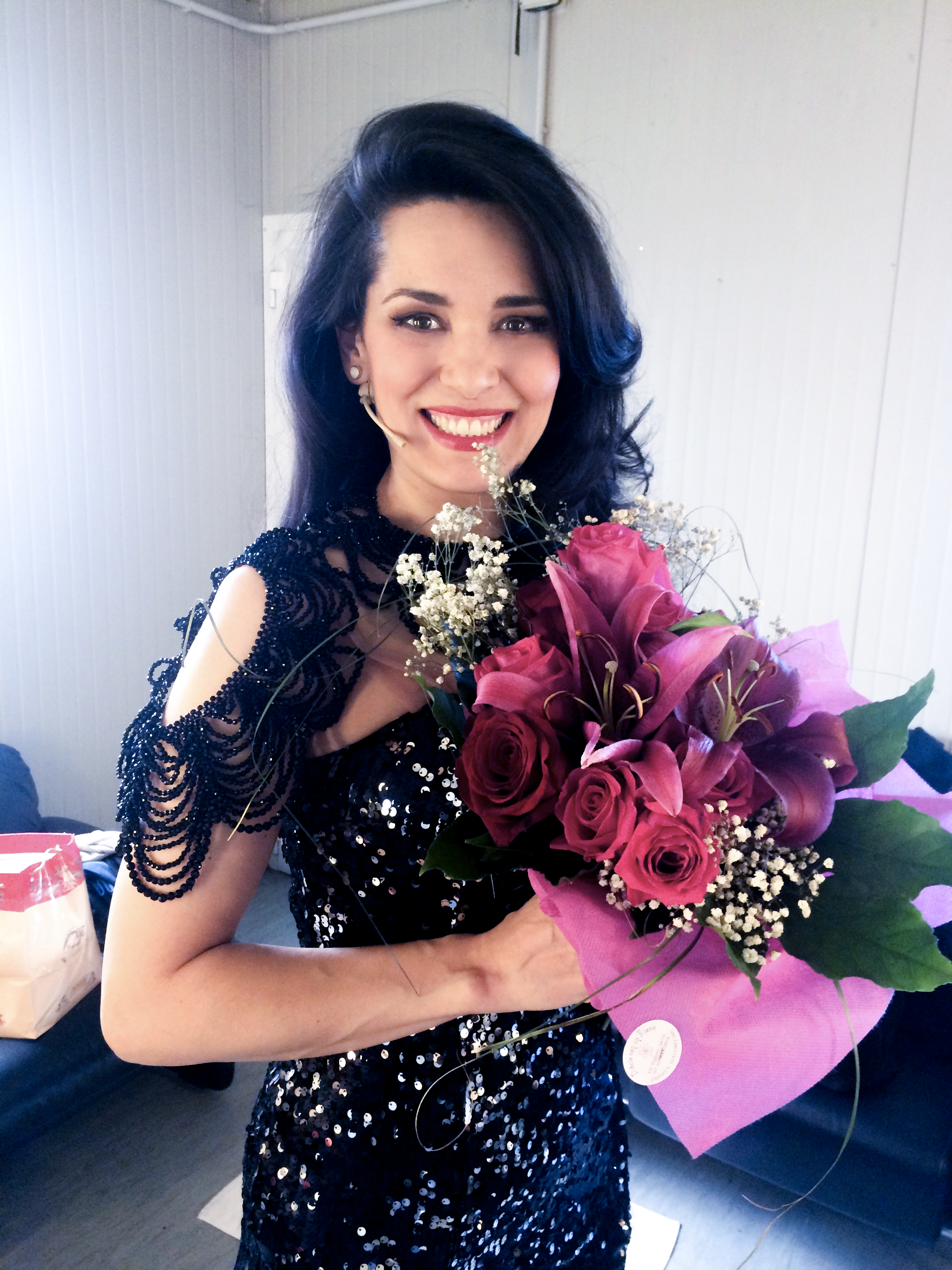
- Mario in 2015
- Born: 9 October 1969 (age 56); Camposampiero, Italy
- Occupations: Dancer; actress; television personality

Lorenza Mario (born 9 October 1969) is an Italian dancer, actress and television personality.

== Life and career ==
Born in Camposampiero, Mario began to study classical dance aged 9 years old. After graduating at the Liceo Linguistico in Padua, she debuted as a professional dancer with the company Veneto Balletto. In 1990 she made her stage debut as an actress in the play La sorpresa dell’amore, starring Ottavia Piccolo and Remo Girone.

After participating as a dancer to several variety shows, in the late 1990s, Mario became popular as the primadonna of the company "Il Bagaglino" for their television and stage shows.
