= Come un fiore =

2020 Italian short film

- Directed by: Benedicta Boccoli
- Written by: Benedicta Boccoli
- Starring: Gisella Burinato; Fulvia Lorenzetti; Gaia Zucchi
- Music by: Fiorenzo Carpi; Franco Eco
- Release date: October 20, 2023 (Auditorium Conciliazione)
- Running time: 12 minutes
- Country: Italy
- Language: Italian

Come un fiore is a 2023 Italian short film, written and directed by Benedicta Boccoli. It stars Gisella Burinato, Fulvia Lorenzetti and Gaia Zucchi.;

== Plot ==
On a Mediterranean beach, a young girl meets a group of women resembling Greek goddesses who celebrate their femininity.

== Production ==
The short film takes inspiration from the summers the director spent in Formentera during her childhood. During a stay on the island, the young Benedicta sees a woman on the beach who has had a breast removed following a mastectomy. What deeply impressed the young girl was that the woman had adorned her surgical scars with flowers rather than trying to hide them, thereby expressing a form of acceptance of her body.

== Cast ==
- Francesca Fariello
- Carol Cadeo
- Gisella Burinato
- Kenja Anaya
- Giada Galluzzo
- Marianne Leoni
- Fulvia Lorenzetti
- Federica Lucaferri
- Stefania Palmisano
- Laura Sellari
- Valentina Serrano
- Fabrizio Zampollini
- Gaia Zucchi

== Awards ==
- The film was presented in the official competition at the Alice nella città; festival and competed in the "Short Films" category at the 69th David di Donatello.
- Carlo Delle Piane International Award – Best Lead Actress to Fulvia Lorenzetti
