= Amedeo Minghi =

Italian musician (born 1947)

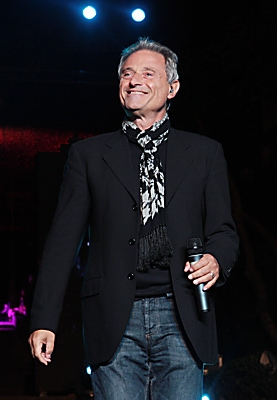
- Minghi in 2009

Background information
- Born: 12 August 1947 (age 79); Rome, Italy
- Genres: Pop; Italian popular music; adult contemporary
- Years active: 1966–present
- Labels: Dischi Ricordi; Apollo; CBS; It; RCA Italiana; Fonit Cetra; EMI Italiana
- Website: www.amedeominghi.info

Amedeo Minghi (born 12 August 1947) is an Italian singer-songwriter, composer and producer.

== Life and career ==
Born in Rome, Minghi started his career in the mid-1960s participating in a large number of musical contests, and then making his professional debut in 1966 with the single "Alla fine", with lyrics by Mogol.

The disappointing commercial results of the song and the military service took him away from the musical industry for several years. Following a new single in 1971, in 1973 he released his first eponymous album, with the uncredited collaboration of Francesco De Gregori. In the same years Minghi started collaborating as a composer with several artists, such as Vianella and Ricchi e Poveri. In the mid-1970s he was briefly a member of the musical ensamble Pandemonium, with whom he recorded his song "L'immenso", which got several international covers and was his first real success. Left the group, he released a new album in 1980 (Minghi) and started working as a producer. In 1983 he debuted at the Sanremo Music Festival with the song "1950", with lyrics by Gaio Chiocchio, which was eliminated from the competition but resulted in a critical success and in a classic of his musical repertoire. His subsequent albums got him an increasing following, until the exploit in 1990 thanks to "Vattene amore", a duet with Mietta, a singer he produced; the song ranked third at the Sanremo Music Festival and topped the Italian hit parade for several weeks.

Minghi has written songs for Andrea Bocelli, Mietta, Mia Martini, Anna Oxa, Marcella Bella, Gianni Morandi and Rossana Casale among others, and composed several musical scores for films and television series, including Fantaghirò (also known as Cave of the Golden Rose). In 2013, Justin Timberlake sampled Minghi's "Lustful" in "Only When I Walk Away", part of the album The 20/20 Experience – 2 of 2.

== Discography ==
Albums

- 1973 – Amedeo Minghi (Apollo DZSLA-55165)
- 1980 – Minghi (CBS 84156)
- 1983 – 1950 (It ZPLT 34186)
- 1984 – Quando l'estate verrà (EP) (RCA Italiana PG 70349)
- 1986 – Cuori di pace (RCA Italiana PL 71141)
- 1987 – Serenata (Durium ms al 77471)
- 1988 – Le nuvole e la rosa (Fonit Cetra LPX 210)
- 1991 – Nené (Fonit Cetra TAL 1002)
- 1992 – I ricordi del cuore (Fonit Cetra TDL315)
- 1994 – Come due soli in cielo (Fonit Cetra TLPX 380)
- 1996 – Cantare è d'amore (EMI Italiana 7243 8 37750 2 6)
- 1998 – Decenni (EMI Italiana 7243 4 95074 0 1)
- 2000 – Anita (EMI Italiana 7243 5 00000 2 0)
- 2002 – L'altra faccia della luna (EMI Italiana 7243 5 41570 2 8)
- 2005 – Su di me (EMI Italiana 07243 563503 2 8)
- 2005 – Sotto l'ombrellone (with Lino Banfi) (Delta Dischi 032745 720884)
- 2014 – Suoni tra ieri e domani (Nar International)
- 2016 – La bussola e il cuore (Sony Music)
- 2024 – Anima sbiadita (Warner Music Italy)

Soundtrack albums

- 1991 – Fantaghirò (Mercury 510989–2)
- 1996 – Il fantastico mondo di Amedeo Minghi (EMI-PDU CD30046)
- 2008 – L'allenatore nel pallone 2 (Warner Chappell Music 5051442630022)
- 2011 – Il fantastico mondo di Fantaghirò (RTI SpA – Edel Music)
- 2012 – Anita Garibaldi (Rai Trade – Edel Music)

Live albums

- 1989 – La vita mia (Fonit Cetra LPX 238)
- 1990 – Amedeo Minghi in concerto (Fonit Cetra TLPX 268)
- 1993 – Dallo Stadio Olimpico di Roma (Fonit Cetra TAL1007)
- 1995 – Come due soli in cielo "Il racconto" (Live) (Fonit Cetra TCDL390)
- 2011 – Un uomo venuto da lontano (Itwhy)
