= Pietralata (film) =

- Directed by: Gianni Leacche
- Starring: Benedicta Boccoli; Carla Magda Capitanio; Claudio Botosso; Massimo Bonetti; Edoardo Velo
- Release date: 2008
- Running time: 103 mins.
- Country: Italy
- Language: Italian

Pietralata (Italian: Pietralata) is a 2008 Italian film directed by Gianni Leacche. The film concerns a protest against the current film industry, and it was shot in 2007 in the Pietralata, a quartiere of Rome, in the eastern part of the city.

== Plot ==
The film is set in Rome: Edoardo and Giancarlo, old friends who want to become actors, are reunited after many years and are still determined to realize their dream.

However, they realize the inefficiency of the film industry and also have personal problems: Edoardo falls into a deep depression, and the family of Giancarlo would like him to become a taxi driver. The situation of the two friends is a little relieved by two women, Lucrezia and Francesca, whom they meet.

== Cast ==
- Benedicta Boccoli: Lucrezia
- Carla Magda Capitanio: Francesca
- Claudio Botosso: Edoardo
- Massimo Bonetti: Giancarlo
- Edoardo Velo
