= Nicola Arigliano =

Italian jazz singer and musician (1923–2010)

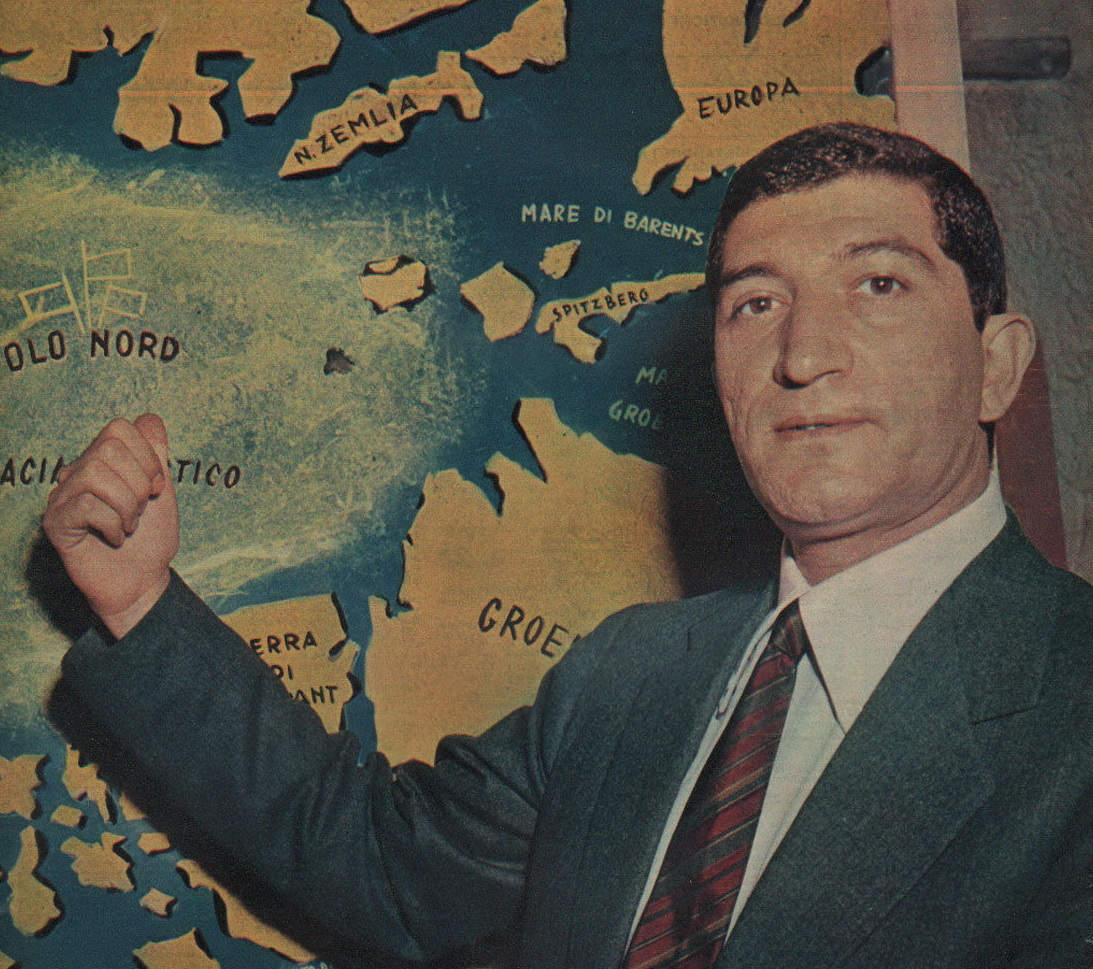
- Nicola Arigliano in 1960
- Born: 6 December 1923; Squinzano, Province of Lecce
- Died: 30 March 2010 (aged 86); Calimera, Province of Lecce
- Occupation: Singer

Nicola Arigliano (6 December 1923 – 30 March 2010) was an Italian jazz singer, musician, and occasional actor. Born in Squinzano, Province of Lecce, at young age he ran away from home because of the humiliations received even by family members due to his stuttering and moved to Turin, where he was hosted by fellow immigrants. He later moved to Milan and later to Rome, where he held several jobs.

After studying music theory, learning to play the saxophone and singing as an amateur in several orchestras, Arigliano became first known in 1952 thanks to the participation at the Newport Jazz Festival (at the suggestion of Marshall Brown), which back in Italy got him several television appearances and which gave the way to his professional career. After some 78 rpm released in 1956 for RCA, in 1958 he took part at Canzonissima, and in 1960 he got his first hit with the song "I Sing Ammore", which reached the ninth place on the Italian hit parade. In 1961 he got his major success with the song "Sentimentale", which peaked on first place at the hit parade, while in 1964 he entered the main competition at the Sanremo Music Festival with the song "20 Km Al Giorno".

His song Permettete signorina also knows a version in English by Nat King Cole: Cappuccina. In 1968, Arigliano moved to Magliano Sabina and significantly slowed his activities. In 2005 he came back at the Sanremo Music Festival and won the Critics' Award with the song "Colpevole". Arigliano sang in Italian and in English, sometimes playfully mixing the languages.
