= Fausto Leali =

Italian singer (born 1944)

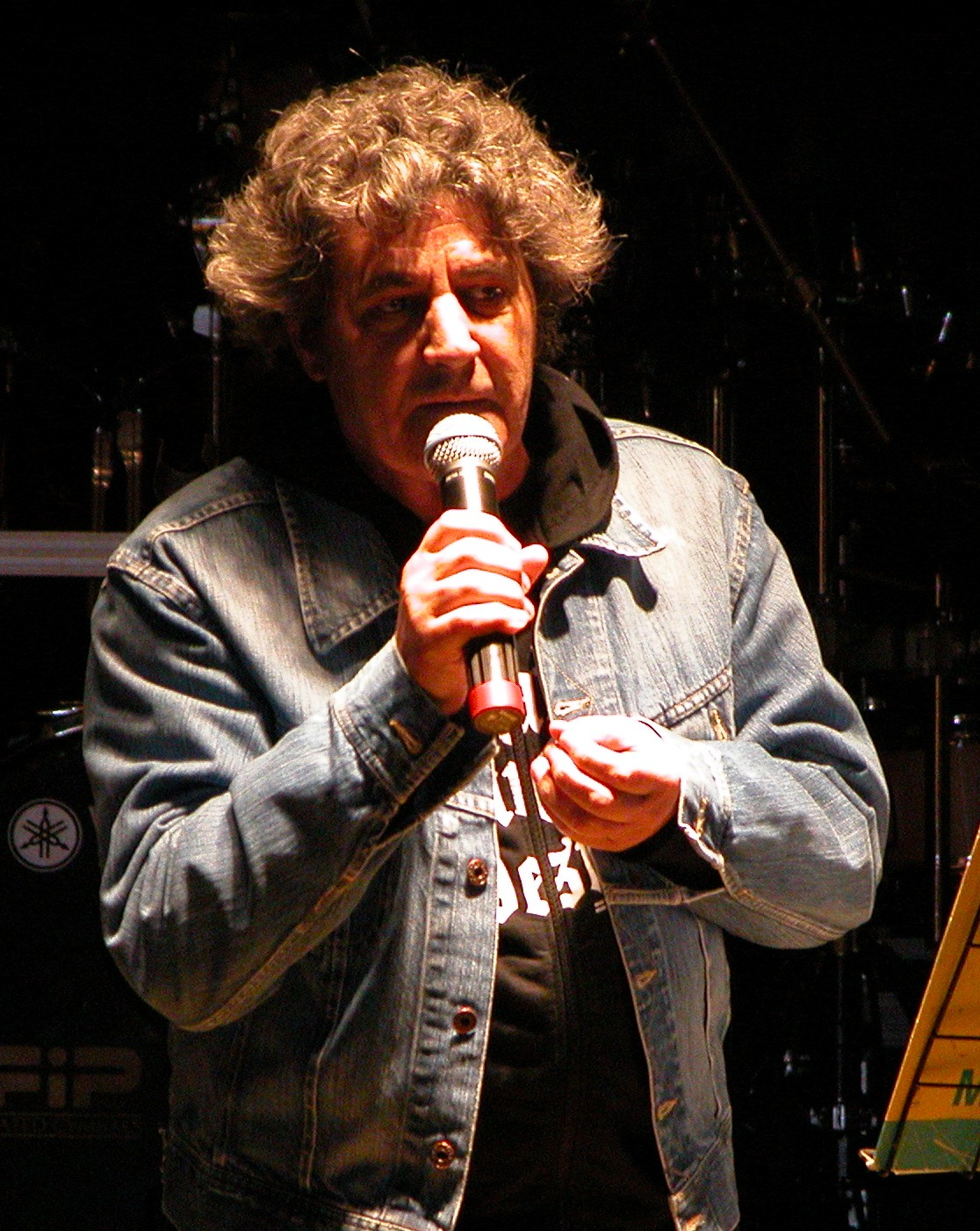
- Fausto Leali in 2006

Background information
- Born: Faustino Leali; 29 October 1944 (age 81); Nuvolento, Lombardy, Kingdom of Italy
- Origin: Brescia, Lombardy, Italy
- Genres: Pop; soul; blue-eyed soul; blues
- Occupations: Singer; songwriter
- Years active: 1960–present
- Labels: Music; Jolly; Ri-Fi; Philips; CBS; CGD; Itaca; Dischi Ricordi
- Spouse: Milena Cantù (m. 1968)
- Website: www.faustoleali.com

Faustino "Fausto" Leali (born 29 October 1944) is an Italian singer and songwriter.

== Career ==
Leali began his musical career as a singer in several bands in Brescia, near his native Nuvolento. His first guitar teacher was Tullio Romano, of the band Los Marcellos Ferial.

Leali's first release was a 1962 promotional single as "Fausto Denis", for the magazine Nuova Enigmistica Tascabile. He then joined the Novelty, a Beat band formed by Franco Piacibello (saxophone), Delio Ombrella (drums), Silvio Pesce (bass) and Piero Braggi (guitar) in Alessandria that had already released an EP in 1961. With the group he managed to obtain a recording contract with the Music record label, and release a few singles, including two covers of Beatles –"Please Please Me" and "Lei ti ama" ("She Loves You"). Leali's big opportunity came in 1966 when A&R executive Ezio Leoni moved from Music record label to Ri-Fi, bringing Leali and the Novelty with him.

Leali and The Novelty's first success was "A chi" ("To whom"), in 1967, an Italian version of a 1954 American song "Hurt", written by Roy Hamilton. "A chi" sold over one million copies, and was awarded a gold disc. In the same year, Leali took part for the first time in the music festival Un disco per l'estate, with the song "Senza di te" ("Without you"), but did not progress beyond the first round.

In 1969, 1971, and 1974, he appeared again in Un disco per l'estate with the songs "Tu non meritavi una canzone" ("You did not deserve a song"), "Si chiama Maria" ("Her name is Maria"), and "Solo lei" ("Only you"). He returned to the hit parade in 1976 with the single "Io camminerò" ("I will go"), which reached the top of charts, and in 1980 with a performance of Totò's song "Malafemmena" ("Bad woman" in Neapolitan).

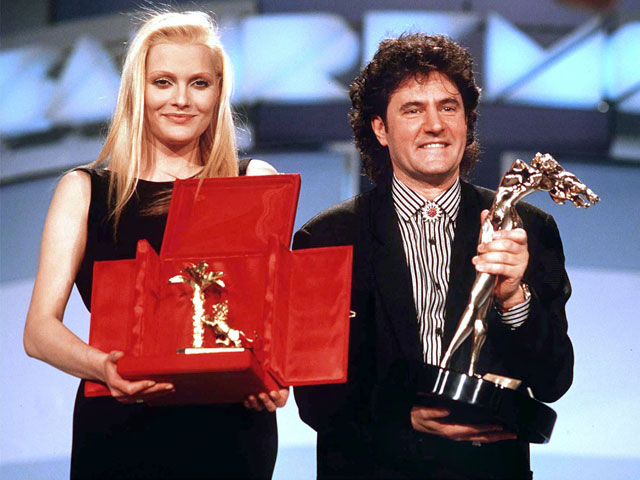
Leali and Anna Oxa upon winning Sanremo 1989

In the late 1980s, he made several appearances at the Sanremo Festival; in 1987, with "Io amo" ("I love"), that came in 4th; in 1988, with "Mi manchi" ("I miss you") at 5th; and in 1989, in the duet with Anna Oxa "Ti lascerò" ("I will let you") that won 1st place. The same year, Oxa and Leali represented Italy in the Eurovision Song Contest with "Avrei voluto" ("I would have wanted to"). The song was voted in the 9th place. Leali returned to Sanremo in 2002, with "Ora che ho bisogno di te" ("Now that I need you"), a duet with Luisa Corna, and the next year with "Eri tu" ("It was you"), which eventually went platinum.

After taking part in 2006 in the Rai Due reality show, Music Farm, where he reached the finals, Leali released a new album, Profumo e Kerosene (Perfume and Kerosene), with ten new songs, all in a new for him musical style.

Due to his naturally hoarse singing style, Leali was nicknamed by the Italian media Il negro bianco, "the white negro", also the title of his 1968 album.

Leali was a guest on the second night of the Sanremo Music Festival 2026, where he was handed a special lifetime achievement award in consideration of his thirteen participations in the festival and the success of many of his entries.

== Personal life ==
Ιn 1968, Leali married the singer Milena Cantù, who was with the record company founded by Adriano Celentano. They had a daughter, Deborah, so named after the success of the eponymous song of that year's Sanremo Festival, sung at the competition in a duet with Wilson Pickett and finishing in fourth place.

== Selected discography ==
=== Albums ===
- 1964 Fausto Leali
- 1966 Fausto Leali e i suoi Novelty
- 1968 Il negro bianco
- 1975 Amore Dolce, Amore Amaro, Amore Mio
- 1976 Io camminerò
- 1977 Leapoli
- 1981 Un attimo di blu
- 1992 Saremo promossi
- 1994 Anima nuda
- 2002 Secondo me ... io ti amo
- 2006 Profumo e Kerosene
- 2016 Non sono Leali

=== Singles ===
- 1961 "Il mondo di Suzie Wong" / "Veleno dolce"
- 1961 "I magnifici sette" / "Madonnina delle due strade"
- 1961 "Lei" / "Non sono più la tua ragazza"
- 1961 "Amarti così" / "Lo squilibrato"
- 1963 "Please please me" / "5 giorni"
- 1963 "Follie d'estate" / "Non voglio più piangere"
- 1964 "La campagna in città" / "Ho perduto"
- 1964 "Lei ti ama" / "Danza senza nome"
- 1964 "Allora non-era amore" / "Baby Jane"
- 1965 "Raccontalo ad un altro" / "Un bacio in più"
- 1965 "Sha La La" / "Sorriderai"
- 1966 "È solo un gioco" / "Per un momento ho perso te"
- 1966 "Mamma perdonami" / "E non-lo scorderai"
- 1967 "A chi" / "Se qualcuno cercasse di te"
- 1967 "Senza di te" / "Oscurità"
- 1967 "Senza luce" ("A whiter shade of pale") / "Per un momento ho perso te"
- 1968 "Deborah" / "Non importa se"
- 1968 "Angeli negri" / "Potrai fidarti di me"
- 1968 "È colpa sua" / "Chiudo gli occhi e conto a sei"
- 1969 "Un'ora fa" / "Non l'hai capito"
- 1969 "Tu non-meritavi una canzone" / "Sono un uomo che non-sa"
- 1969 "Portami con te" / "Sei stata troppo tempo in copertina"
- 1970 "Hippy" / "Una voce amica"
- 1970 "Ave Maria no morro" / "Jasemine"
- 1971 "Si chiama Maria" / "America"
- 1971 "Lei" / "Piango per chi"
- 1972 "L'uomo e il cane" / "La mia primavera"
- 1972 "Karany karanué" / "Buongiorno professore"
- 1973 "La bandiera di sole" / "Il vento lo racconterà"
- 1973 "Samantha" / "Buongiorno professoreò"
- 1973 "Quando me ne andrò" / "Canto per lei"
- 1974 "Solo lei" / "Non andremo mai in paradiso"
- 1975 "Amore dolce, amore amara, amore mio" / "Dum dum la la"
- 1976 "Io camminerò" / "L'ultima volta"
- 1977 "Vierno" / "Di sera"
- 1978 "Tu non-mia" / "Soli non-si può"
- 1980 "Musica ti amo" / "A costo di morire"
- 1981 "Malafemmena" /Il tuo posto"
- 1981 "Canzone facile" / "Non ti arrendi mai"
- 1982 "Gente comune" / "Vado col vento"
- 1983 "Canzone amara" / "Camminando"
- 1984 "Io, io senza te" / "Allora no"
- 1986 "Via di qua" (side A with Mina) / "Cosa manca"
- 1987 "Io amo" / "Notte d'amore" (side B with Loredana Bertè)
- 1988 "Mi manchi" / "Col tempo"
- 1989 "Ti lascerò" / "Ti lascerò" (instrumental) (with Anna Oxa)
- 1989 Avrei voluto" / "Avrei voluto" (instrumental) (with Anna Oxa)
- 1992 "Perché"
- 1997 "Non ami che te"
- 2002 "Ora che ho bisogno di te" (with Luisa Corna)
- 2003 "Eri tu"
- 2006 "Nascerà"
- 2009 "Una piccola parte di te"
- 2011 "Sono tornato"
- 2016 "A chi mi dice" (with Mina)

== Filmography ==
- I ragazzi dell'Hully Gully (1964)
- Escort in Love (2011)

Preceded by Massimo Ranieri with "Perdere l'amore"	Sanremo Music Festival; Winner; 1989	Succeeded by Pooh with "Uomini soli"
Preceded by Luca Barbarossa with Vivo (Ti scrivo)	Italy in the Eurovision Song Contest; 1989 (with Anna Oxa)	Succeeded by Toto Cutugno with Insieme: 1992
