= Benedicta Boccoli =

Italian theater and movie actress

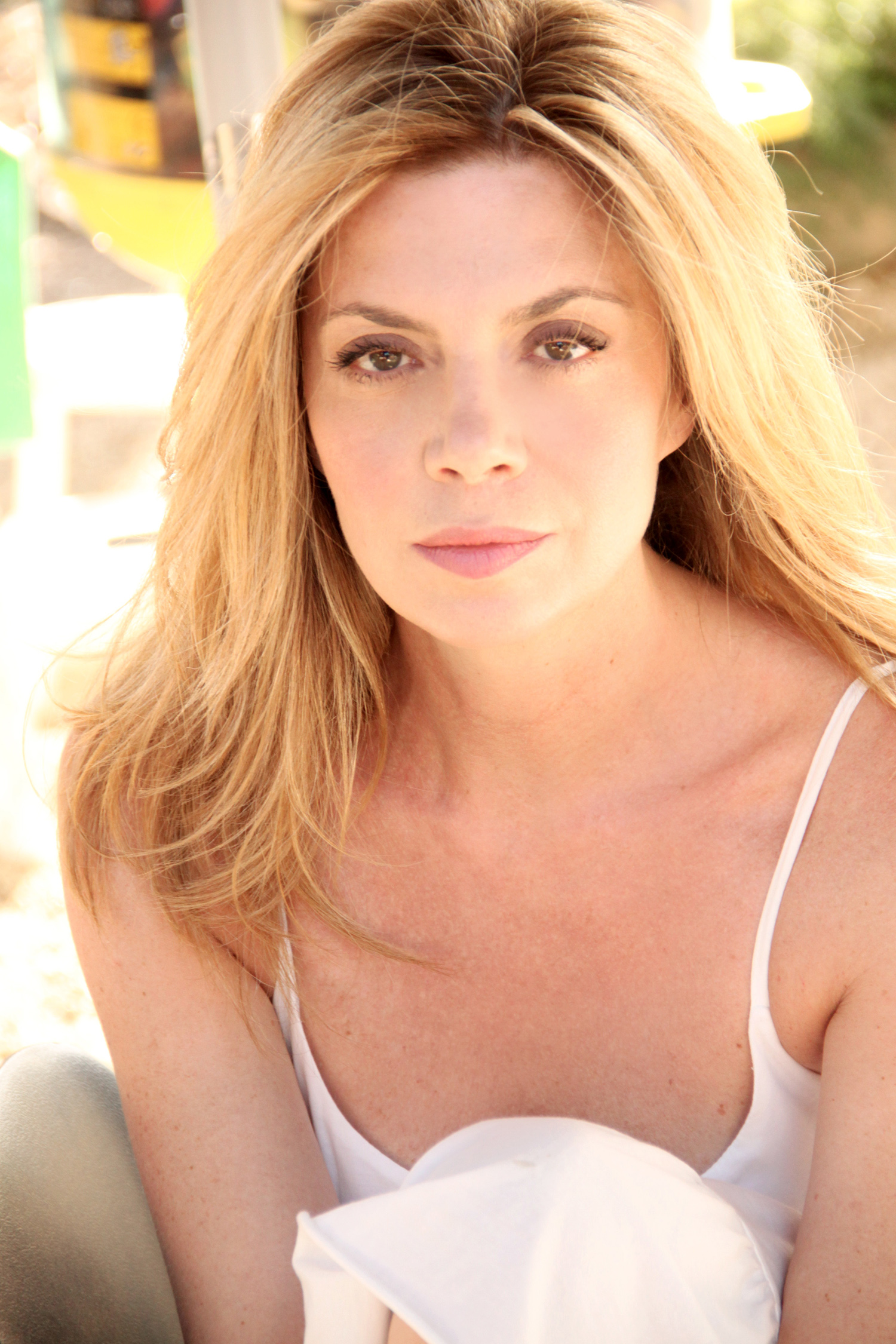
- Benedicta Boccoli in 2013
- Born: 11 November 1966 (age 59); Milan, Italy
- Occupation: Actress
- Years active: 1984–present
- Partner: Maurizio Micheli (2025)
- Website: benedictaboccoli.it

Benedicta Boccoli (born 11 November 1966) is an Italian theater and movie actress.

== Biography ==
Born in Milan on 11 November 1966, she moved to Rome with her family as a child. Her sister Brigitta is also an actress. She has two brothers, Barnaby and Filippo.

Known for being an eclectic and versatile actress, she made her television debut at the age of 18. A few years later, she realized that her true passion as an actress lay in theatre.

Actor and director Giorgio Albertazzi nicknamed her the Artistissima (the ultimate artist) due to her outstanding performances. She has also received favorable reviews in newspapers such as Corriere della Sera, La Repubblica, La Stampa, Il Tempo, and La Gazzetta del Mezzogiorno.

Every Monday, she writes a column titled Cosa resterà for Il Fatto Quotidiano. It's a diary reflecting on the life of a teenager in the 1980s and 1990s.

On 28 August 2025 she married actor Maurizio Micheli, her partner since 1998.;;

== Career highlights ==
=== Film ===
- Gli angeli di Borsellino, director Rocco Cesareo – 2003
- Valzer, director Salvatore Maira – 2007
- Pietralata, director Gianni Leacche – 2008
- Ciao Brother, director Nicola Barnaba – 2016
- Colpevole, director Gianni Leacche - 2024

=== Short film ===
- La confessione, director herself – 2020;
- Come un fiore, director herself – 2023, on raising awareness for breast cancer prevention and body acceptance;

=== Theater ===
- Blithe Spirit of Noël Coward, with Ugo Pagliai and Paola Gassman – 1992/1993 –
- Cantando Cantando of Maurizio Micheli, with Maurizio Micheli, Aldo Ralli and Gianluca Guidi – 1994/1995 –
- Buonanotte Bettina, of Pietro Garinei e Sandro Giovannini, with Maurizio Micheli and Miranda Martino - 1995/1996/1997 –
- Can-Can – Musical of Abe Burrows, 1998/1999 –
- Orfeo all'inferno – Opera di Jacques Offenbach – 1999 – acting Tersicore
- Polvere di stelle, 2000/2001/2002
- Le Pillole d'Ercole of Maurice Hennequin and Paul Bilhaud, with Maurizio Micheli, dir. Maurizio Nichetti - 2002/2003/2004
- Anfitrione, of Plautus, with Maurizio Micheli, dir Michele Mirabella - 2004
- Stalker of Rebecca Gillmann, dir Marcello Cotugno - 2004
- Plutus of Aristofanes, with Maurizio Micheli, dir Michele Mirabella - 2004
- Cactus flower of Pierre Barillet and Jean-Pierre Grédy, with Edoardo Siravo, dir Tonino Pulci - 2004/2005/2006
- Prova a farmi ridere of Alan Aykbourn, with Pino Quartullo, dir. Maurizio Micheli - 2006
- The Tempest of William Shakespeare, – 2006 – Ariel
- Sunshine of William Mastrosimone, directed by Giorgio Albertazzi, 2007/2008
- L'Appartamento, of Billy Wilder, 2009–2010
- Il marito scornato (Georges Dandin), of Molière, 2011
- Vite private, of Noël Coward, with Corrado Tedeschi – 2012–2013
- Dis-order, of Neil LaBute, dir. Marcello Cotugno, with Claudio Botosso – 2014
- Incubi d'Amore, of Augusto Fornari, Toni Fornari, Andrea Maia, Vincenzo Sinopoli, dir. Augusto Fornari, with Sebastiano Somma and Morgana Forcella – 2014
- Crimini del Cuore, of Beth Henley, dir. Marco Mattolini – 2015
- A Room with a View, of E. M. Forster, dir. Stefano Artissunch – 2016
- Cactus Flower of Pierre Barillet and Jean-Pierre Gredy, dir Piergiorgio Piccoli and Aristide Genovese - 2016
- Il più brutto week-end della nostra vita of Norm Foster, dir. Maurizio Micheli - 2017-2018
- The test of Jordi Vallejo, dir. Roberto Ciufoli - 2019–2020-2021-2022-2023;
- Su con la vita of Maurizio Micheli, dir. Maurizio Micheli - 2020;
- Les Précieuses ridicules free taken from Molière, dir. Stefano Artissunch, with Lorenza Mario and Stefano Artissunch - 2023-2024;
- Donne in pericolo of Wendy MacLeod, dir. Enrico Maria Lamanna (with Benedicta Boccoli, Vittoria Belvedere and Debora Caprioglio; 2024-2025)

=== Television ===
- Pronto, chi gioca?, directed by Gianni Boncompagni
- Domenica In – with her sister Brigitta Boccoli from 1987 to 1990
- Viva Colombo inclosed in Il sabato sera di Rai Uno - 1991
- Gelato al limone – with Massimiliano Pani
- Unomattina – 1994
- Due come noi – Co-starring with Wilma De Angelis – 1997
- Incantesimo
- Reality Circus – Reality show 2006/2007

== Gallery ==
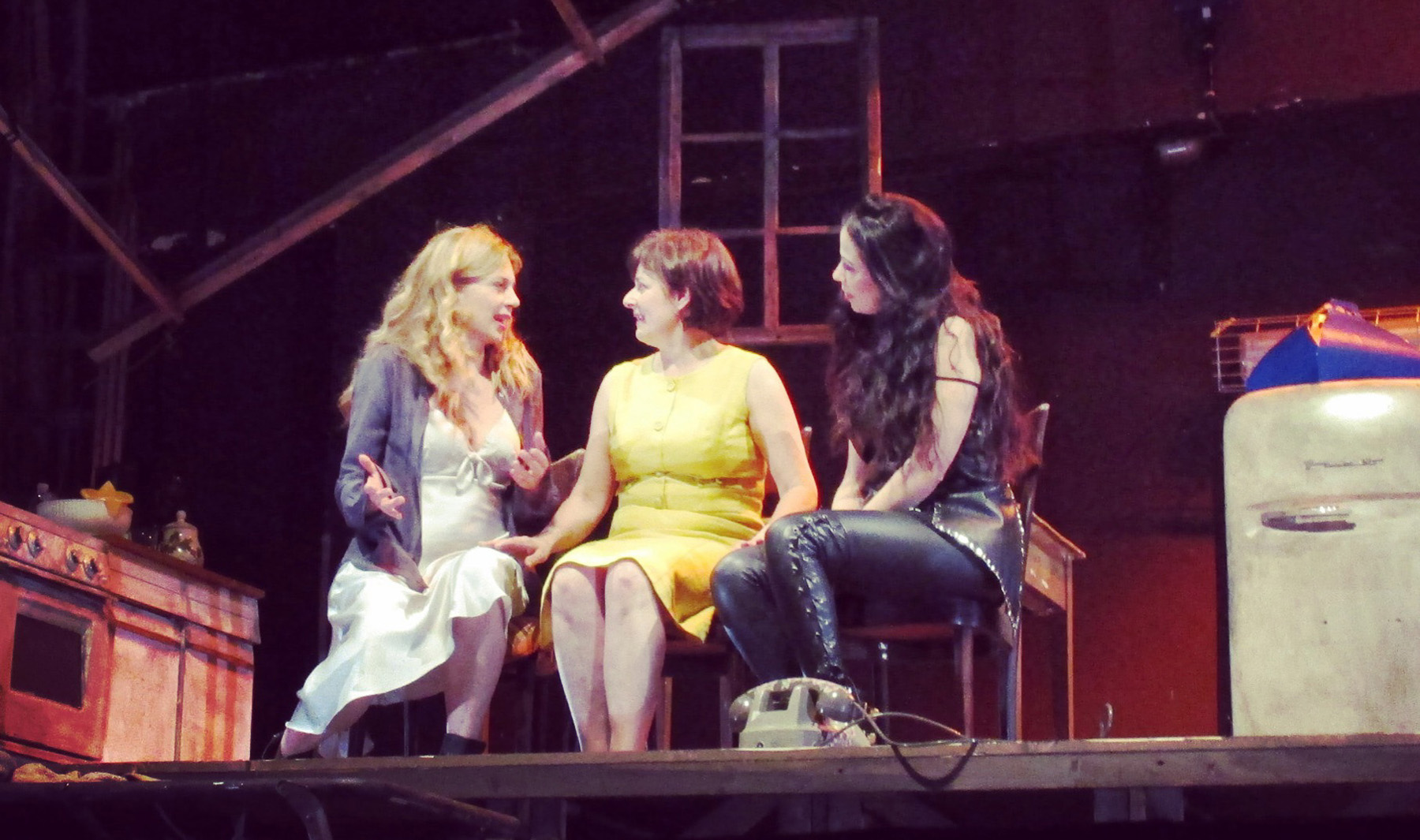
Benedicta Boccoli, Paola Bonesi and Fulvia Lorenzetti in Crimini del Cuore ("Crimes of the Heart"), 1 May 2015.

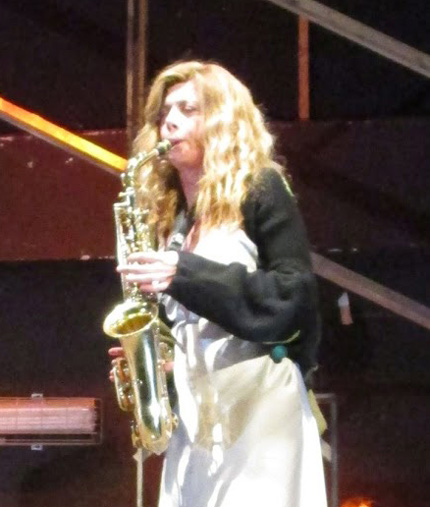
Benedicta Boccoli and her sax in Crimini del Cuore, 1 May 2015.

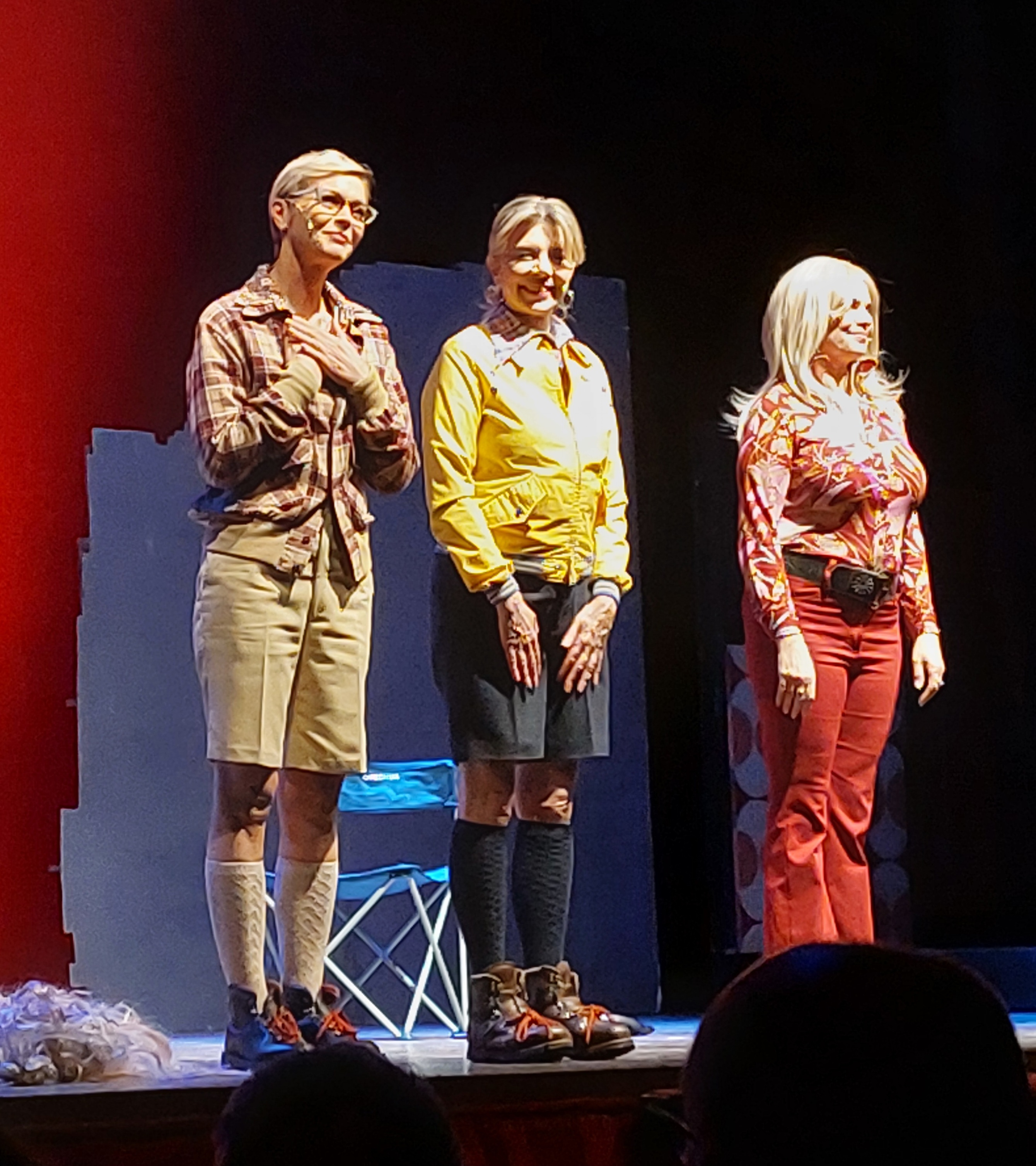
Vittoria Belvedere, Benedicta Boccoli and Debora Caprioglio acting Donne in pericolo, Teatro San Domenico, Crema, 1 December 2024.
