= Anna Oxa =

Italian singer (born 1961)

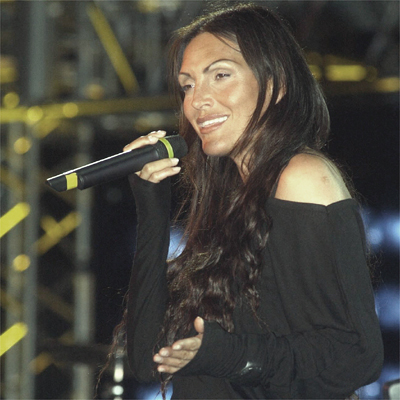
- Oxa in 2009

Background information
- Born: Anna Hoxha; 28 April 1961 (age 65); Bari, Italy
- Genres: Pop rock; soft rock; adult contemporary
- Occupations: Singer; actress; television presenter
- Years active: 1978–present
- Labels: RCA; CBS; Columbia; Sony; EMI
- Website: www.oxarte.net

Anna Hoxha (Albanian: [ˈana ˈhɔdʒa]; born 28 April 1961), known professionally as Anna Oxa (Italian: [ˈanna ˈɔksa]), is an Italian singer, actress and television presenter. She has received mainstream popularity and recognition within Italy due to her numerous participations in the Sanremo Music Festival.

Beginning her career as a teenager, Oxa debuted in the Sanremo Music Festival 1978 with the song "Un'emozione da poco", placing second in the competition. Following her success in Sanremo, she released her debut studio album Oxanna (1978) that year, which became her first chart-topping album in Italy. After numerous participations in Sanremo during the 1980s, Oxa competed again in the Sanremo Music Festival 1989, performing "Ti lascerò" as a duet with Fausto Leali. The duo won the competition, and thus were chosen as the Italian representatives in the Eurovision Song Contest 1989 in Lausanne, competing with the song "Avrei voluto"; they placed ninth in the finals. Oxa went on to win Sanremo once more, as a soloist, in 1999, with the song "Senza pietà". In total, Oxa has competed in Sanremo fifteen times across six decades (a record shared with Al Bano, Milva, Peppino di Capri and Toto Cutugno), and additionally hosted the competition in 1994.

In her 45-year long career, Oxa has released seventeen studio albums, of which two of them have charted at number-one on the FIMI Albums Chart. Aside from singing, Oxa co-hosted the TV show Fantastico for two years, was a judge on Amici di Maria De Filippi, and competed in the Italian version of Dancing with the Stars. As an actress, she has appeared in Stryx (1978) and the film Maschio, femmina, fiore, frutto (1979).

== Early life ==
Oxa was born on 28 April 1961 in Bari to an Albanian father originally from Krujë, Qazim Hoxha, and an Italian mother, Elena Piccininno. She was raised in the San Pasquale neighborhood of Bari, and attended school at the liceo artistico Giuseppe De Nittis.

== Career ==
=== 1970s–1980s: beginnings and breakthrough ===
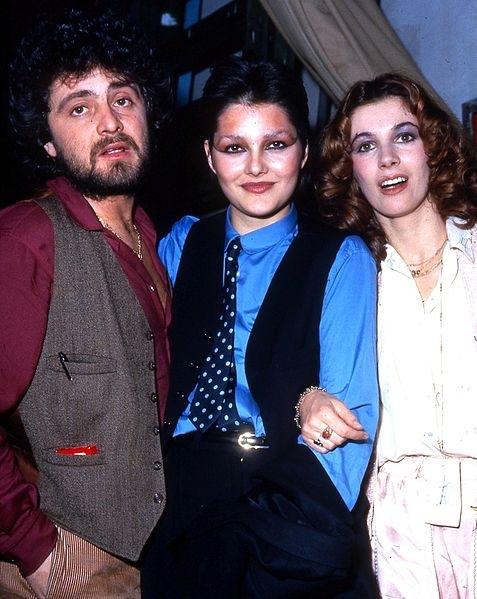
Oxa between Beppe Grillo and Stefania Casini at Sanremo 1978

Oxa began her career at the Sanremo Music Festival 1978, performing the song "Un'emozione da poco", written by Ivano Fossati, who also sponsored her performance. Sporting an androgynous punk look, Oxa achieved great success in the competition, reaching second place behind only Matia Bazar. After the show, "Un'emozione da poco" was released as a single by record label RCA Italiana, and became Oxa's first number-one single in Italy. Following the success of "Un'emozione da poco", Oxa released her debut studio album Oxanna (1978). The album also became a chart-topping success in Italy. The second single off of Oxanna, "Fatelo con me", also written by Fossati, was selected to compete in the 1978 edition of Festivalbar and became a top twenty hit in Italy.

Oxa later began to collaborate with Italian singers Lucio Dalla and Rino Gaetano. With them, she released the single "Il pagliaccio azzurro" in 1979, an Italian language cover of the song "Till it Shines" by American musician Bob Seger. The single was used as the lead single for Oxa's self-titled second studio album, released the same year. The album peaked within the top ten in Italy, and also included an Italian cover of the song "Because the Night" by Patti Smith. To promote the album, Oxa ventured into acting and appeared as the lead in the musical film Maschio, femmina, fiore, frutto (1979). In 1980, Oxa released the single "Controllo totale", an Italian cover of the song "Total Control" by The Motels; the single became a top forty hit in Italy, and served as the lead single for her debut extended play of the same name.

After declining sales and a lack of promotion from her label, Oxa cut ties with RCA Italiana and signed a contract with CBS Records International in 1981. She returned to Sanremo the following year, competing in the Sanremo Music Festival 1982 with the song "Io no". Oxa's participation saw a great stylistic change in her image; she no longer sported her androgynous punk look that she had become known for, and instead grew her hair long and dyed it blonde, adopting a sexier appearance that went on to define her career for the following decades. "Io no" placed as a finalist in the competition, and went on to become a top forty hit. Despite this, CBS International did not believe it performed well enough to warrant an entire album. The following year, Oxa released the single "Navigando" to serve as the lead single to her third studio album, titled Per sognare, per cantare, per ballare (1983). Oxa continued to take part in Sanremo several times during the 1980s, competing in 1984, 1985, 1986, and 1988, placing within the top seven each time. Her 1986 entry, "È tutto un attimo", went on to become a massive success in Italy; while only placing fifth in Sanremo, it became her second chart-topping hit in her home country, and served as the lead single to her album È tutto un attimo (1986), which peaked at number-three.

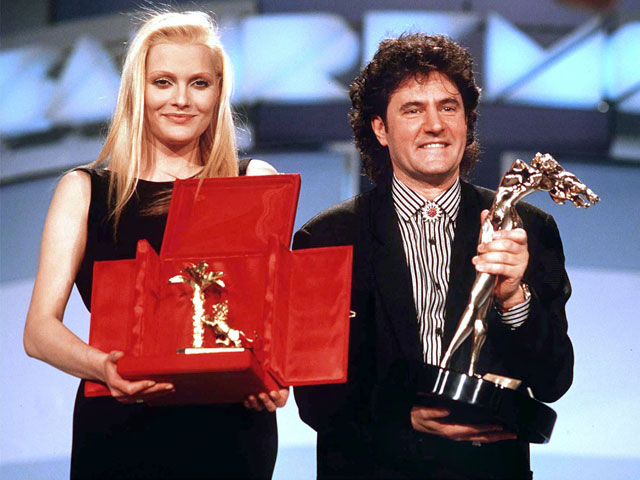
Oxa with Fausto Leali after winning the Sanremo Music Festival 1989

Following the success of È tutto un attimo, Oxa began pursuing television presenting and was a co-presenter of Fantastico in 1988 and 1989. Oxa entered the Sanremo Music Festival 1989 as a duet with Italian singer Fausto Leali, performing the song "Ti lascerò". "Ti lascerò" went on to win the competition, becoming the first winning song for both Oxa and Leali, and became Oxa's third number-one single in Italy. Following their win, the duo was selected to represent Italy in the Eurovision Song Contest 1989 in Lausanne. They opted to record a new song for the competition, and competed with "Avrei voluto"; the song placed ninth in the final. "Avrei voluto" was released as a single from Oxa's album Tutti i brividi del mondo (1989), which became her second chart-topping album in Italy.

=== 1990s–2000s: continued success ===
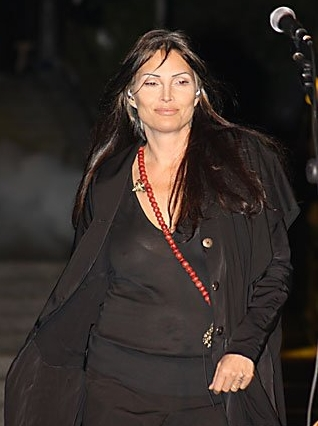
Oxa in 2008

Oxa returned to Sanremo the year after her win, competing in the Sanremo Music Festival 1990 with the song "Donna con te". The song was originally to be performed by Patty Pravo, but after Pravo demanded multiple changes be made to the song and eventually refused to perform it, Oxa was asked to replace her. "Donna con te" performed well, becoming a finalist in Sanremo and a top ten hit in Italy. Despite the single's success, it was not included on a studio album and only appeared on Oxa – Live con i New Trolls (1990), Oxa's collaborative live album with Italian band New Trolls. Following the collapse of CBS International in 1990, Oxa was transferred to the Columbia Records label under Sony Music. Her first release with the new label was "Mezzo angolo di cielo", released in 1992 and becoming a top twenty hit. She followed up the success of the single with the release of the album Di questa vita (1992); the album peaked at number-five in Italy. Following this release, Oxa took a brief hiatus from performing original music. She hosted the Telemontecarlo (TMC) program Viaggio al centro della musica and later the Sanremo Music Festival 1994. From 1993 to 1994, Oxa released two cover albums and one album of remakes of her previous releases.

Her first original release since Di questa vita came in 1996, releasing the single "Spot" which competed in Festivalbar 1996. The single was later included on the album Anna non-si lascia (1996), which peaked at number-ten in Italy. Her first greatest hits album Storie – I miei più grandi successi (1997) was later released the following year, including songs from both her CBS International and Columbia contracts. Oxa competed in the Sanremo Music Festival 1997 with the album's lead single "Storie", placing second. In 1999, Oxa signed to Sony BMG, which also received the rights to the songs that Oxa recorded while signed to RCA Italiana in the 1970s and early-1980s. That year, she competed in the Sanremo Music Festival 1999 with the song "Senza pietà". She went on to win the competition, earning her second Sanremo win. As Italy was not participating in the Eurovision Song Contest at this time, however, she was not asked to represent her country at the Eurovision Song Contest 1999 in Jerusalem. "Senza pietà" went on to be a top ten hit in Italy, and served as the lead single to Oxa's album of the same name, which peaked at number-three.

In 2001, Oxa released the single "L'eterno movimento", which served as the lead single to her album of the same name. The song saw a stylistic change in Oxa's music, instead incorporating an international sound. Oxa competed in the Sanremo Music Festival 2001 with "L'eterno movimento", where she placed tenth. That year, Oxa appeared as a co-presenter on the second season of the Italian variety show Torno sabato (2000–04) with Giorgio Panariello. She competed in Sanremo twice more in the decade, in 2003 and 2006; in 2003, Oxa placed fourteenth with "Cambierò", while in 2006, Oxa did not qualify to the final with "Processo a me stessa".

=== 2010s–present: other ventures ===
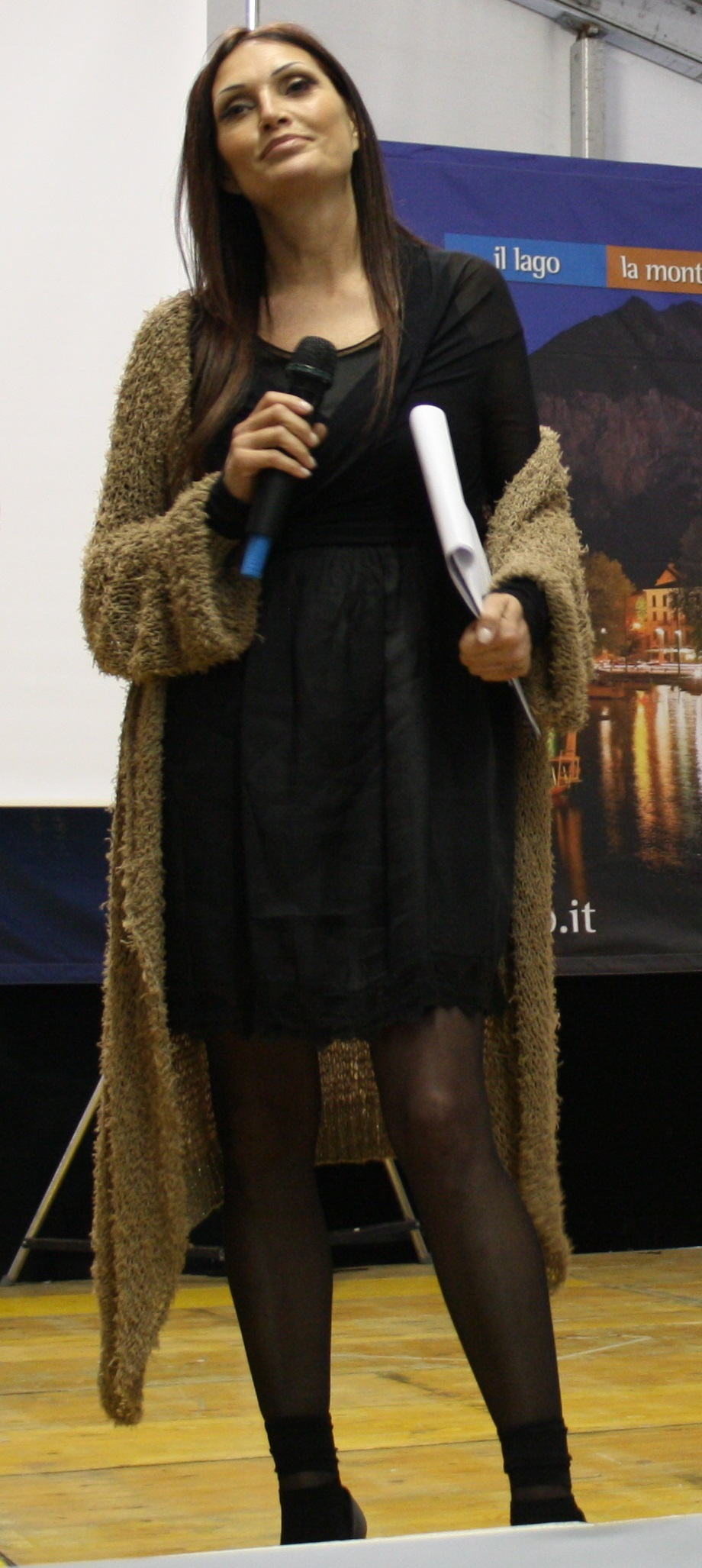
Oxa in 2012

In 2010, Oxa released her most recent studio album Proxima (2010). The album was preceded by the release of the single "Tutto l'amore intorno", a collaboration with her former collaborator Ivano Fossati. The single became a top ten hit in Italy, while the album peaked at number-two in Oxa's home country. She later returned to Sanremo a final time, competing in the Sanremo Music Festival 2011 with the song "La mia anima d'uomo", with which she did not qualify to the final. With her participation in the 2011 competition, Oxa had competed in Sanremo a total of fourteen times, spread out across five decades.

In 2013, Oxa was invited by Milly Carlucci to compete in series nine of Ballando con le Stelle, the Italian version of Dancing with the Stars. She was partnered with professional dancer Samuel Peron and received the highest scores from weeks one to three. She withdrew from the competition in week six following a leg injury. In 2016, she appeared in the judging panel for series fifteen of the talent competition show Amici di Maria De Filippi, appearing alongside singer Loredana Bertè and actress Sabrina Ferilli.

On 4 December 2022, it was officially announced that Anna Oxa would participate in the Sanremo Music Festival 2023. Her entry was later revealed to be "Sali (Canto dell'anima)".

== Personal life ==
Oxa has been married four times. She married her first husband, Franco Ciani, in the early-1980s, although they later divorced. Soon after, she married Gianni Belleno. With Belleno, she had two children: Francesca (born 1991) and Qazim (born 1995). They later divorced. In 1999, Oxa married Kosovar politician Behgjet Pacolli; they later divorced in 2002. Her fourth husband was her bodyguard Marco Sansonetti, whom she married in 2006; they divorced three years later.

Since her youth, Oxa has been vegan. In 2020, Oxa was granted Albanian citizenship by Albanian prime minister Edi Rama.

== Discography ==
=== Albums ===
- Oxanna (1978)
- Anna Oxa (1979)
- Per sognare, per cantare, per ballare (1983)
- La mia corsa (1984)
- Oxa (1985)
- È tutto un attimo (1986)
- Fantastica Oxa (1988)
- Pensami per te (1988)
- Tutti i brividi del mondo (1989)
- Oxa live con i New Trolls (1990)
- Di questa vita (1992)
- Cantautori (1993)
- Do di petto (1993)
- Cantautori 2 (1994)
- Anna non si lascia (1996)
- Storie – I miei più grandi successi (1997)
- Senza pietà (1999)
- L'eterno movimento (2001)
- Collezione (2001)
- Ho un sogno (2003)
- La musica è niente se tu non hai vissuto (2006)
- Proxima (2010)

=== Singles ===
Awards and achievements
Preceded by Massimo Ranieri with "Perdere l'amore"	Sanremo Music Festival winner 1989 (with Fausto Leali)	Succeeded by Pooh with "Uomini soli"
Preceded by Luca Barbarossa with "Vivo (Ti scrivo)"	Italy in the Eurovision Song Contest; 1989 (with Fausto Leali)	Succeeded by Toto Cutugno with "Insieme: 1992"
Preceded by (Sweden) Lotta Engberg with "Juliette & Jonathan"	OGAE Second Chance Contest winner 1997	Succeeded by (Netherlands) Nurlaila with "Alsof je bij me bent"
Preceded by Annalisa Minetti with "Senza te o con te"	Sanremo Music Festival winner 1999	Succeeded by Piccola Orchestra Avion Travel with "Sentimento"
