= Sanremo Music Festival winners discography =

The discography of the Sanremo Music Festival winners includes all the winning singles of the annual Italian Song Festival, better known as the Sanremo Music Festival, a song contest held in the Ligurian city of the same name since 1951 and broadcast by RAI. As of 2026, the Festival has awarded 76 songs, but from 1953 to 1955, from 1957 to 1971, in 1990 and in 1991, each entry was performed by two different acts, resulting in two different releases for each winning song, for a total of 96 singles. The current holder is Sal Da Vinci with his song "Per sempre sì".

Twenty-one Sanremo Music Festival winning songs reached the top spot of the Musica e dischi Singles Chart in the years between 1959, when the first singles chart was introduced in Italy, and 1996. In 1997, the Federation of the Italian Music Industry launched its own official singles chart. Since then, fourteen other winning singles reached number one in Italy. The commercial success in Italy of many Sanremo Music Festival winning entries lasted over the years, resulting in several gold and platinum certifications awarded by FIMI for sales and streaming collected since 2009 by songs originally released in the 1980s, in the 1990s and in the 2000s. Some of the winning songs of the Sanremo Music Festival became international hits after being performed at the Eurovision Song Contest, like Domenico Modugno's "Nel blu dipinto di blu", which took third place in the 1958 contest, Gigliola Cinquetti's "Non ho l'età", which won the European competition in 1964, Mahmood's "Soldi", which placed second in 2019, and the 2021 winning song, "Zitti e buoni" by rock band Måneskin.

== 1951–1959 ==
Year	Song	Artist	Peak chart positions											Sales	Certifications
Year	Song	Artist	ITA	AUT	BEL (FL)	BEL (WA)	FRA	GER	NLD	NOR	SWI	UK	US	Sales	Certifications
1951	"Grazie dei fiori"	Nilla Pizzi	—N/a	—N/a	—N/a	—N/a	—N/a	—N/a	—N/a	—N/a	—N/a	—N/a	—N/a		
1952	"Vola colomba"	Nilla Pizzi	—N/a	—N/a	—N/a	—N/a	—N/a	—N/a	—N/a	—N/a	—N/a	—	—N/a		
1953	"Viale d'autunno"	Carla Boni	—N/a	—N/a	—N/a	—N/a	—N/a	—N/a	—N/a	—N/a	—N/a	—	—N/a		
1953	"Viale d'autunno"	Flo Sandon's	—N/a	—N/a	—N/a	—N/a	—N/a	—N/a	—N/a	—N/a	—N/a	—	—N/a		
1954	"Tutte le mamme"	Giorgio Consolini	—N/a	—N/a	—	—N/a	—N/a	—N/a	—N/a	—N/a	—N/a	—	—N/a		
1954	"Tutte le mamme"	Gino Latilla	—N/a	—N/a	—	—N/a	—N/a	—N/a	—N/a	—N/a	—N/a	—	—N/a		
1955	"Buongiorno Tristezza"	Claudio Villa	—N/a	—N/a	—	—N/a	—	—N/a	—N/a	—N/a	—N/a	—	—N/a		
1955	"Buongiorno Tristezza"	Tullio Pane	—N/a	—N/a	—	—N/a	—	—N/a	—N/a	—N/a	—N/a	—	—N/a		
1956	"Aprite le finestre"	Franca Raimondi	—N/a	—N/a	—	—N/a	—	—N/a	—	—N/a	—N/a	—	—N/a		
1957	"Corde della mia chitarra"	Claudio Villa	—N/a	—N/a	—	—N/a	—	—N/a	—	—N/a	—N/a	—	—N/a		
1957	"Corde della mia chitarra"	Nunzio Gallo	—N/a	—N/a	—	—N/a	—	—N/a	—	—N/a	—N/a	—	—N/a		
1958	"Nel blu dipinto di blu" (Note: Domenico Modugno's "Nel blu dipinto di blu" entered the FIMI Singles Chart in 2013. When the single was released, in 1958, there was no official singles chart in Italy.)	Domenico Modugno	55	—N/a	—	—N/a	17	—N/a	2	2	—N/a	10	1	ITA: 1,000,000	FIMI: Gold
1958	"Nel blu dipinto di blu"	Johnny Dorelli	—N/a	—N/a	—	—N/a	—	—N/a	—	—	—N/a	—	—		
1959	"Piove (Ciao, ciao bambina)"	Domenico Modugno	1	—N/a	1	—N/a	14	12	1	—	—N/a	29	97		
1959	"Piove (Ciao, ciao bambina)"	Johnny Dorelli	—	—N/a	—	—N/a	—	—	—	—	—N/a	—	—		
"—" denotes singles that did not chart or were not released

== 1960–1969 ==
Year	Song	Artist	Peak chart positions											Sales
Year	Song	Artist	ITA	AUT	BEL (FL)	BEL (WA)	FRA	GER	NLD	NOR	SWI	UK	US	Sales
1960	"Romantica"	Tony Dallara	1	—N/a	—	—N/a	—	—	—	—	—N/a	—	—	
1960	"Romantica"	Renato Rascel	15	—N/a	—	—N/a	—	—	—	—	—N/a	—	—	
1961	"Al di là"	Betty Curtis	11	—N/a	—	—N/a	—	—	—	—	—N/a	—	—	
1961	"Al di là"	Luciano Tajoli	3	—N/a	—	—N/a	—	—	—	—	—N/a	—	—	
1962	"Addio, addio"	Domenico Modugno	1	—N/a	—	—N/a	—	—	—	—	—N/a	—	—	
1962	"Addio, addio"	Claudio Villa	—	—N/a	—	—N/a	—	—	—	—	—N/a	—	—	
1963	"Uno per tutte"	Tony Renis	1	—N/a	—	—N/a	—	—	—	—	—N/a	—	—	
1963	"Uno per tutte"	Emilio Pericoli	16	—N/a	—	—N/a	—	—	—	—	—N/a	—	—	
1964	"Non ho l'età"	Gigliola Cinquetti	1	—N/a	1	—N/a	1	3	2	3	—N/a	17	—	ITA: 850,000
1964	"Non ho l'età"	Patricia Carli	—	—N/a	—	—N/a	—	—	—	—	—N/a	—	—	
1965	"Se piangi, se ridi"	Bobby Solo	1	—	2	—N/a	39	—	—	—	—N/a	—	—	
1965	"Se piangi, se ridi"	The New Christy Minstrels	—	—	—	—N/a	—	—	—	—	—N/a	—	—	
1966	"Dio, come ti amo"	Domenico Modugno	1	—	—	—N/a	—	—	—	—	—N/a	—	—	
1966	"Dio, come ti amo"	Gigliola Cinquetti	6	—	—	—N/a	—	—	—	—	—N/a	—	—	
1967	"Non pensare a me"	Claudio Villa	10	—	—	—N/a	—	—	—	—	—N/a	—	—	
1967	"Non pensare a me"	Iva Zanicchi	21	—	—	—N/a	—	—	—	—	—N/a	—	—	
1968	"Canzone per te"	Sergio Endrigo	2	—	—	—N/a	—	—	—	—	—	—	—	
1968	"Canzone per te"	Roberto Carlos	7	—	—	—N/a	—	—	—	—	—	—	—	
1969	"Zingara"	Bobby Solo	1	—	—	—N/a	—	—	—	—	7	—	—	
1969	"Zingara"	Iva Zanicchi	9	—	—	—N/a	—	—	—	—	—	—	—	
"—" denotes singles that did not chart or were not released

== 1970–1979 ==
Year	Song	Artist	Peak chart positions											Certifications
Year	Song	Artist	ITA	AUT	BEL (FL)	BEL (WA)	FRA	GER	NLD	NOR	SWI	UK	US	Certifications
1970	"Chi non lavora non fa l'amore"	Adriano Celentano	1	—	—	—N/a	—	—	—	—	—	—	—	
1970	"Chi non lavora non fa l'amore"	Claudia Mori	57	—	—	—N/a	—	—	—	—	—	—	—	
1971	"Il cuore è uno zingaro"	Nada	5	—	—	—N/a	—	—	—	—	—	—	—	
1971	"Il cuore è uno zingaro"	Nicola Di Bari	1	—	—	—N/a	—	—	—	—	—	—	—	
1972	"I giorni dell'arcobaleno"	Nicola Di Bari	3	—	—	—N/a	—	—	—	—	—	—	—	
1973	"Un grande amore e niente più"	Peppino Di Capri	1	—	—	—N/a	—	—	—	—	—	—	—	
1974	"Ciao, cara, come stai?"	Iva Zanicchi	7	—	—	—N/a	—	—	—	—	—	—	—	
1975	"Ragazza del sud"	Gilda	13	—	—	—N/a	—	—	—	—	—	—	—	
1976	"Non lo faccio più"	Peppino Di Capri	25	—	—	—N/a	—	—	—	—	—	—	—	
1977	"Bella da morire"	Homo Sapiens	9	—	—	—N/a	—	—	—	—	—	—	—	
1978	"...E dirsi ciao"	Matia Bazar	1	—	—	—N/a	—	—	—	—	—	—	—	
1979	"Amare"	Mino Vergnaghi	3	—	—	—N/a	—	—	—	—	—	—	—	
"—" denotes singles that did not chart or were not released

== 1980–1989 ==
Year	Song	Artist	Peak chart positions											Certifications
Year	Song	Artist	ITA	AUT	BEL (FL)	BEL (WA)	FRA	GER	NLD	NOR	SWI	UK	US	Certifications
1980	"Solo noi"	Toto Cutugno	2	—	—	—N/a	—	—	—	—	2	—	—	
1981	"Per Elisa"	Alice	1	4	—	—N/a	—	17	—	—	5	—	—	
1982	"Storie di tutti i giorni"	Riccardo Fogli	1	—	—	—N/a	—	30	—	—	7	—	—	
1983	"Sarà quel che sarà"	Tiziana Rivale	5	—	—	—N/a	—	—	—	—	—	—	—	
1984	"Ci sarà"	Al Bano and Romina Power	1	13	—	—N/a	—	51	—	—	7	—	—	
1985	"Se m'innamoro"	Ricchi e Poveri	6	—	—	—N/a	—	70	—	—	—	—	—	
1986	"Adesso tu"	Eros Ramazzotti	1	1	—	—N/a	—	—	—	—	1	—	—	FIMI: Gold
1987	"Si può dare di più"	Gianni Morandi, Enrico Ruggeri & Umberto Tozzi	1	—	—	—N/a	—	—	—	—	15	—	—	FIMI: Gold
1988	"Perdere l'amore"	Massimo Ranieri	1	—	—	—N/a	—	—	—	—	—	—	—	FIMI: Platinum
1989	"Ti lascerò"	Anna Oxa & Fausto Leali	3	—	—	—N/a	—	—	—	—	—	—	—	FIMI: Gold
"—" denotes singles that did not chart or were not released

== 1990–1999 ==
Year	Song	Artist	Peak chart positions											Certifications
Year	Song	Artist	ITA	AUT	BEL (FL)	BEL (WA)	FRA	GER	NLD	NOR	SWI	UK	US	Certifications
1990	"Uomini soli"	Pooh	2	—	—	—N/a	—	—	—	—	—	—	—	FIMI: Gold
1990	"Angel of the Night"	Dee Dee Bridgewater	9	—	—	—N/a	—	—	—	—	—	—	—	
1991	"Se stiamo insieme"	Riccardo Cocciante	1	—	43	—N/a	—	—	29	—	—	—	—	
1991	"I'm Missing You"	Sarah Jane Morris	11	—	—	—N/a	—	—	—	—	—	—	—	
1992	"Portami a ballare"	Luca Barbarossa	4	—	—	—N/a	—	—	—	—	—	—	—	
1993	"Mistero"	Enrico Ruggeri	1	—	—	—N/a	—	—	—	—	—	—	—	
1994	"Passerà"	Aleandro Baldi	—	—	—	—N/a	—	—	—	—	—	—	—	
1995	"Come saprei"	Giorgia	—	—	—	—	—	—	—	—	—	—	—	FIMI: Gold
1996	"Vorrei incontrarti fra cent'anni"	Ron with Tosca	—	—	—	—	—	—	—	—	—	—	—	FIMI: Gold
1997	"Fiumi di parole"	Jalisse	—	—	—	—	—	—	—	—	—	—	—	
1998	"Senza te o con te"	Annalisa Minetti	—	—	—	—	—	—	—	—	—	—	—	
1999	"Senza pietà"	Anna Oxa	15	—	—	—	—	—	—	—	—	—	—	
"—" denotes singles that did not chart or were not released

== 2000–2009 ==
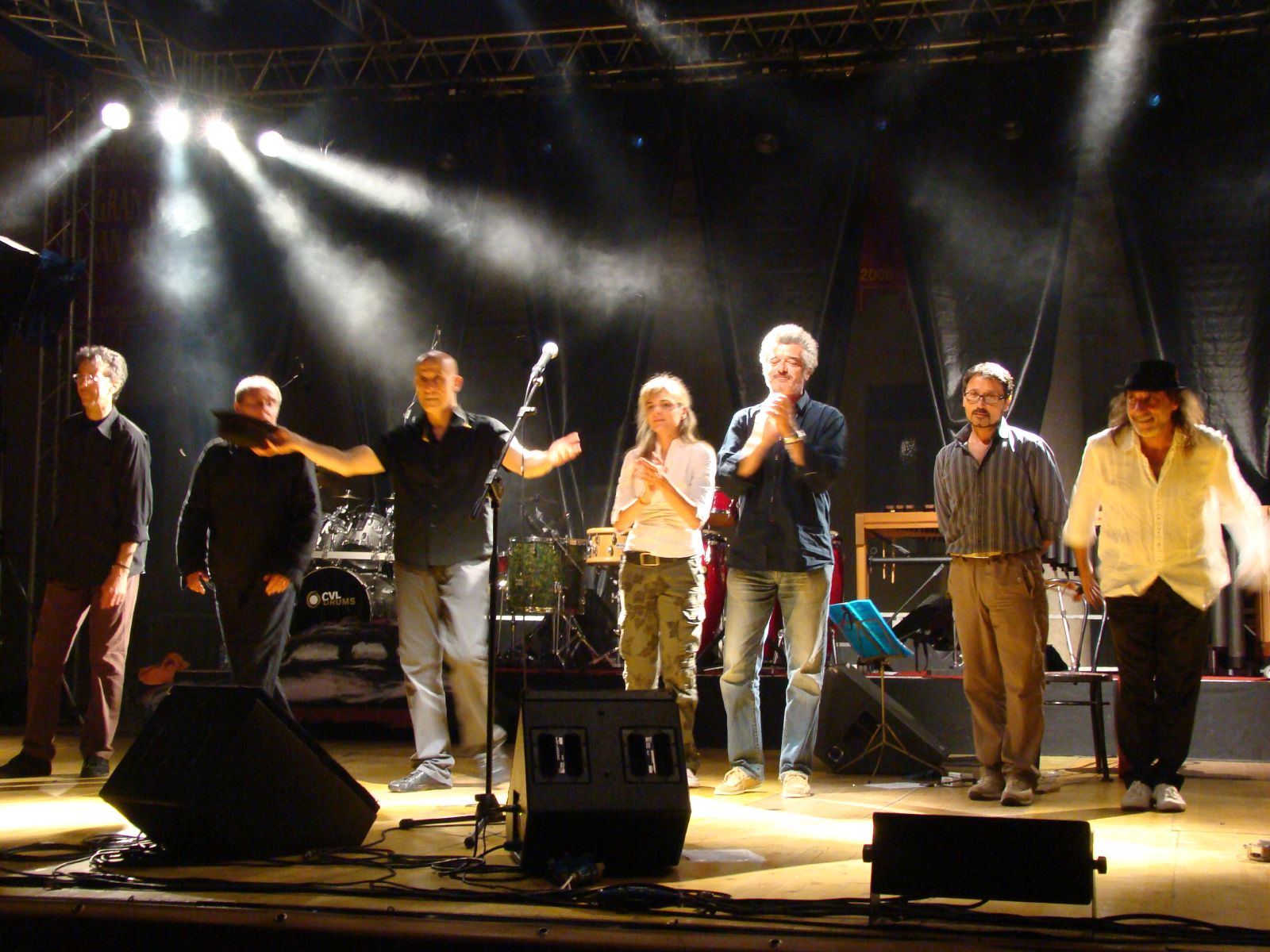
Piccola Orchestra Avion Travel, 2000 winner

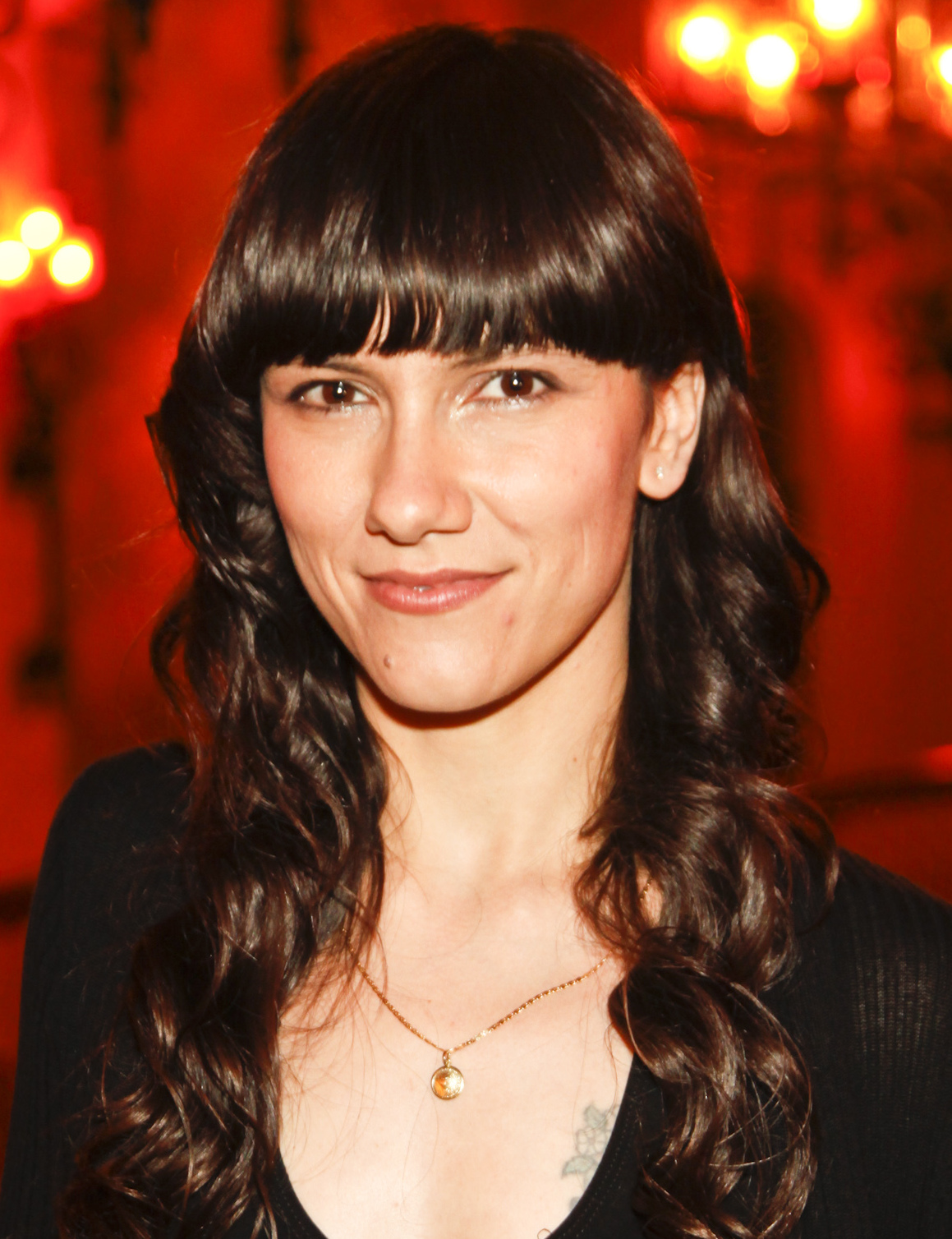
Elisa, 2001 winner

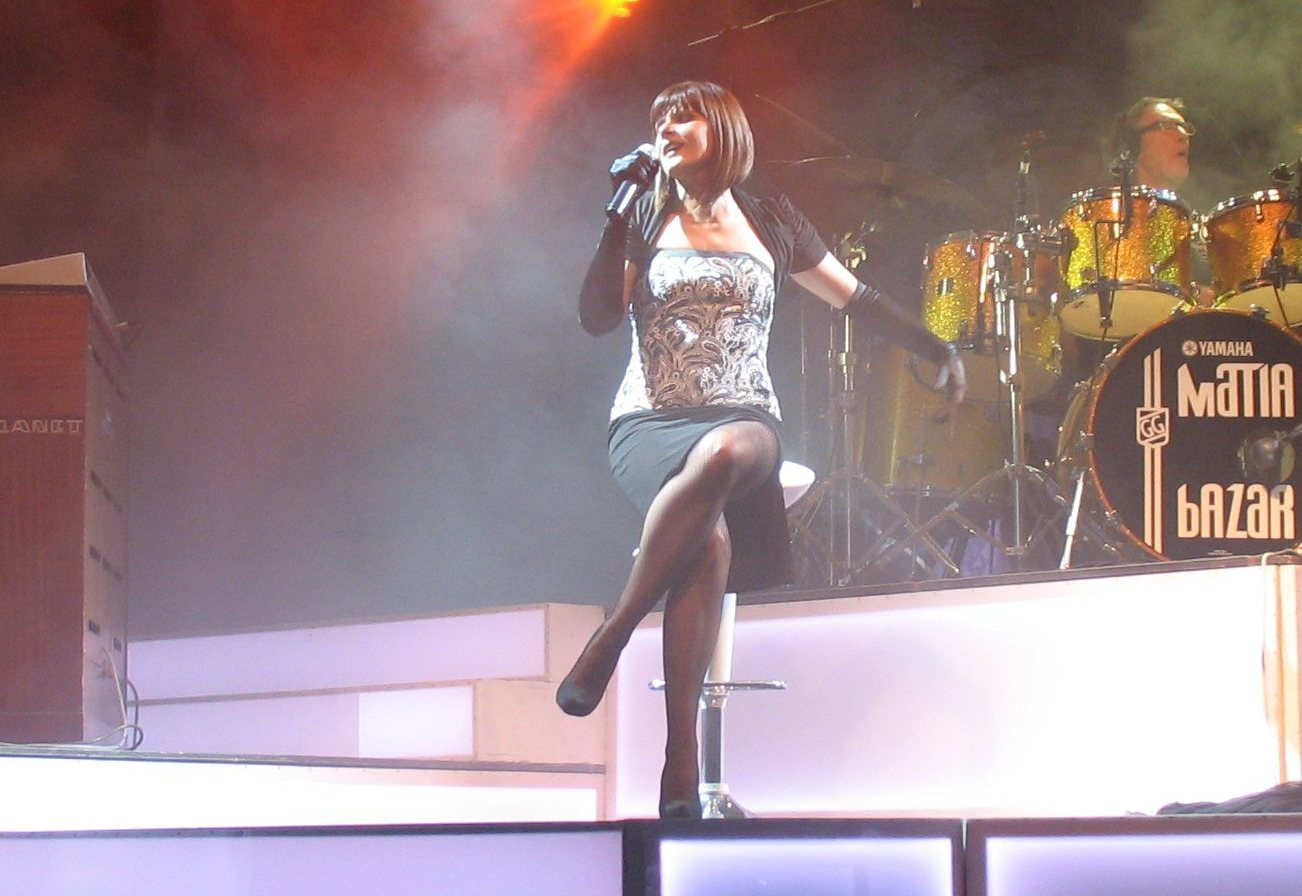
Matia Bazar, 2002 winner

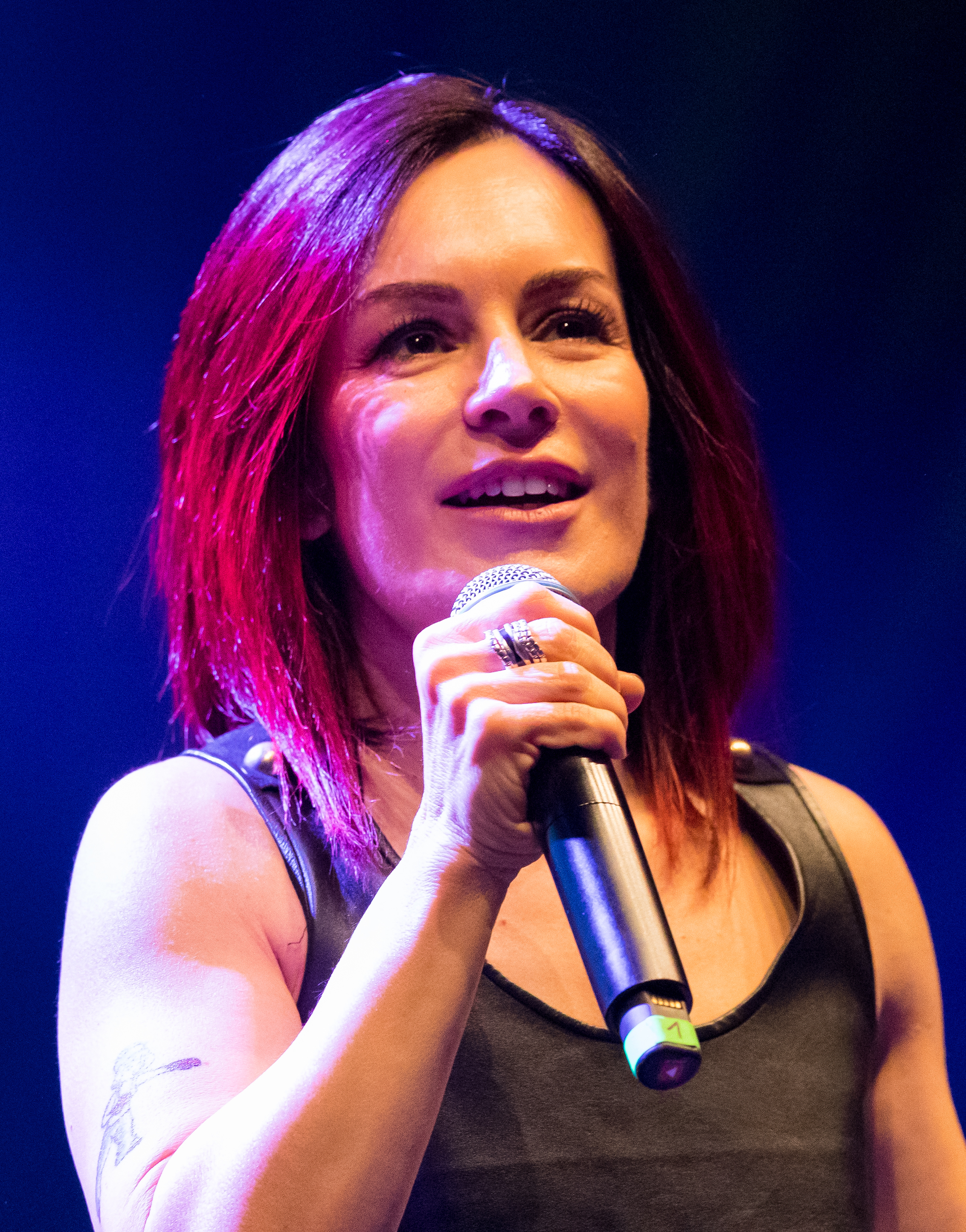
Alexia, 2003 winner

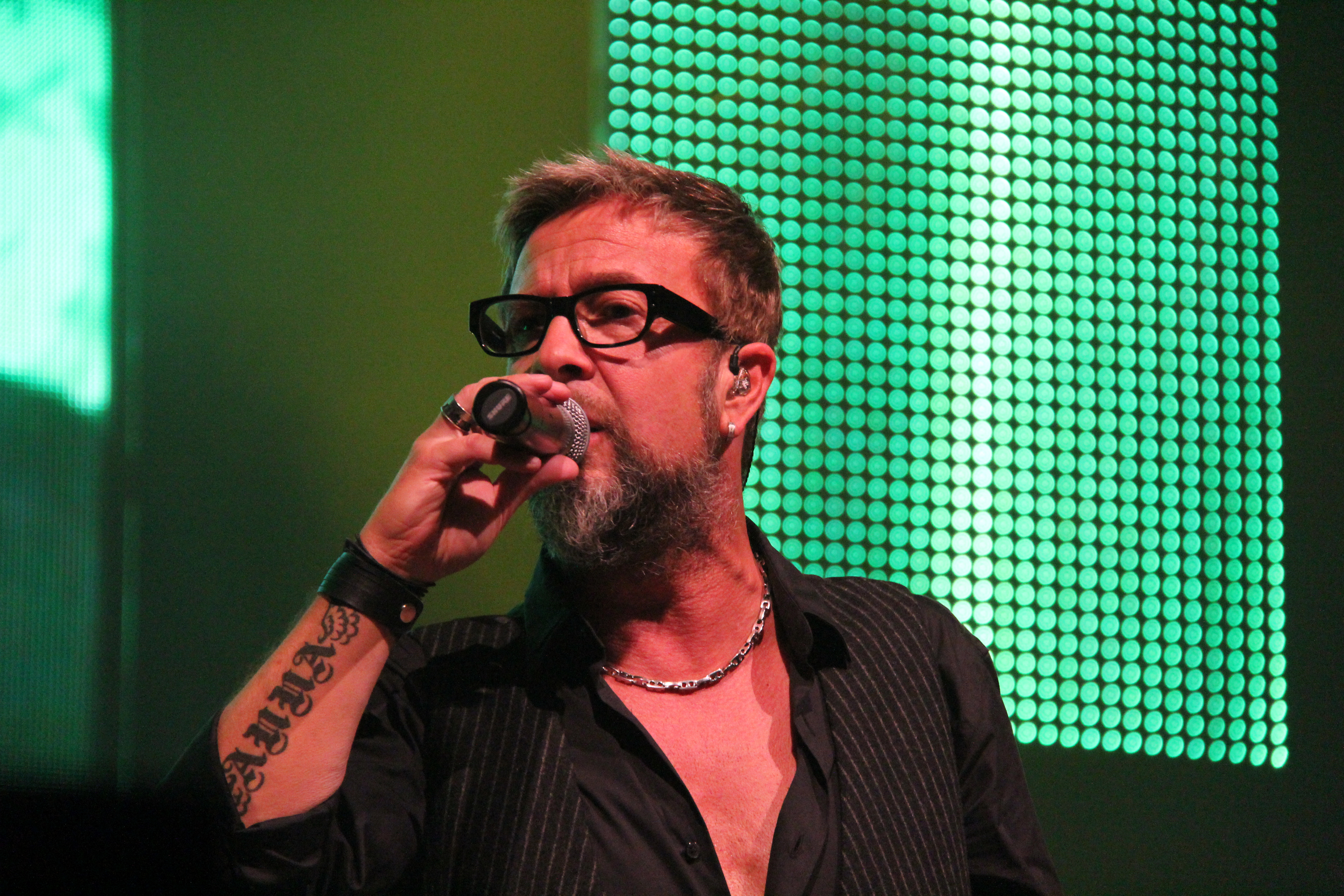
Marco Masini, 2004 winner

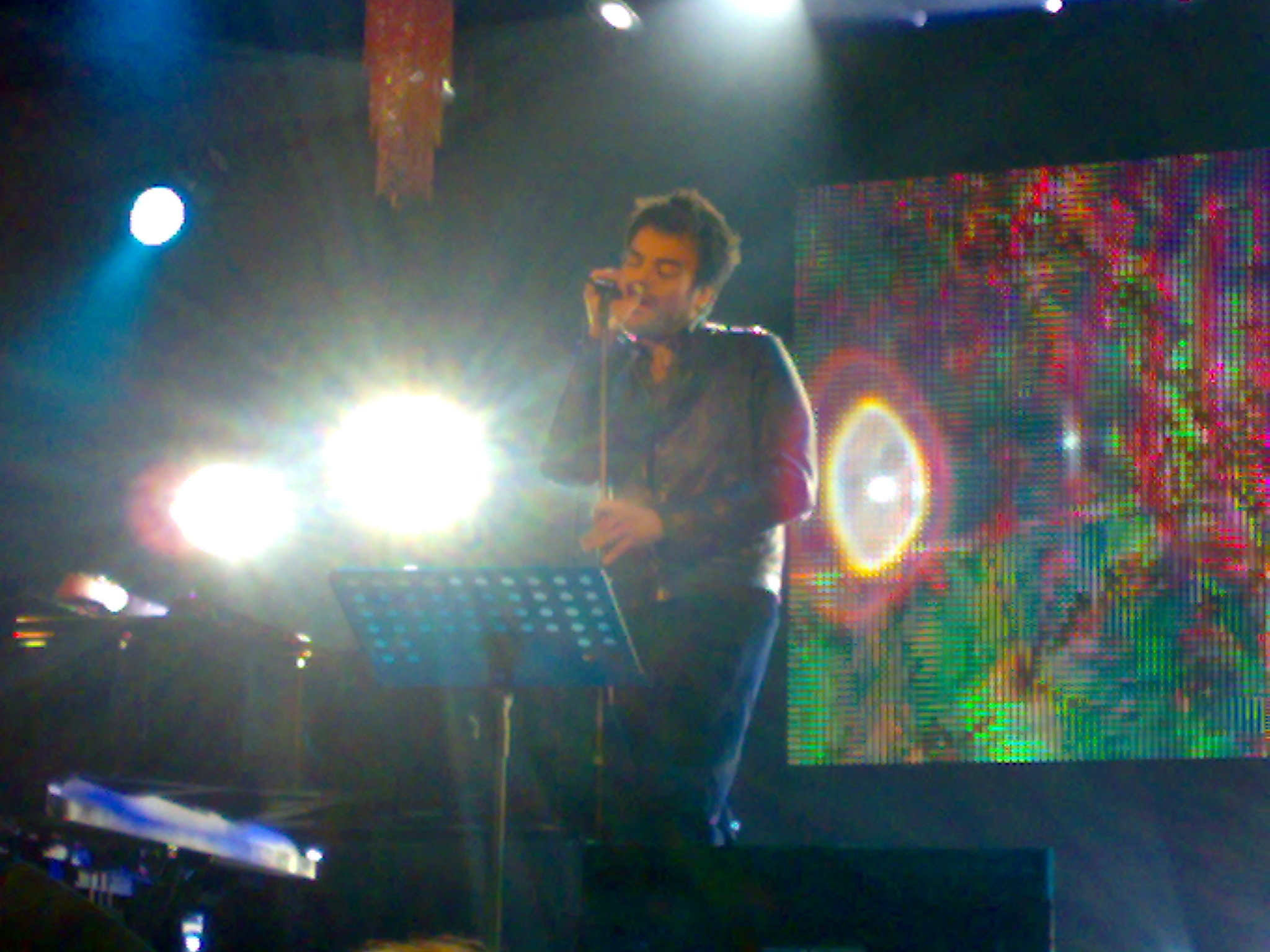
Francesco Renga, 2005 winner

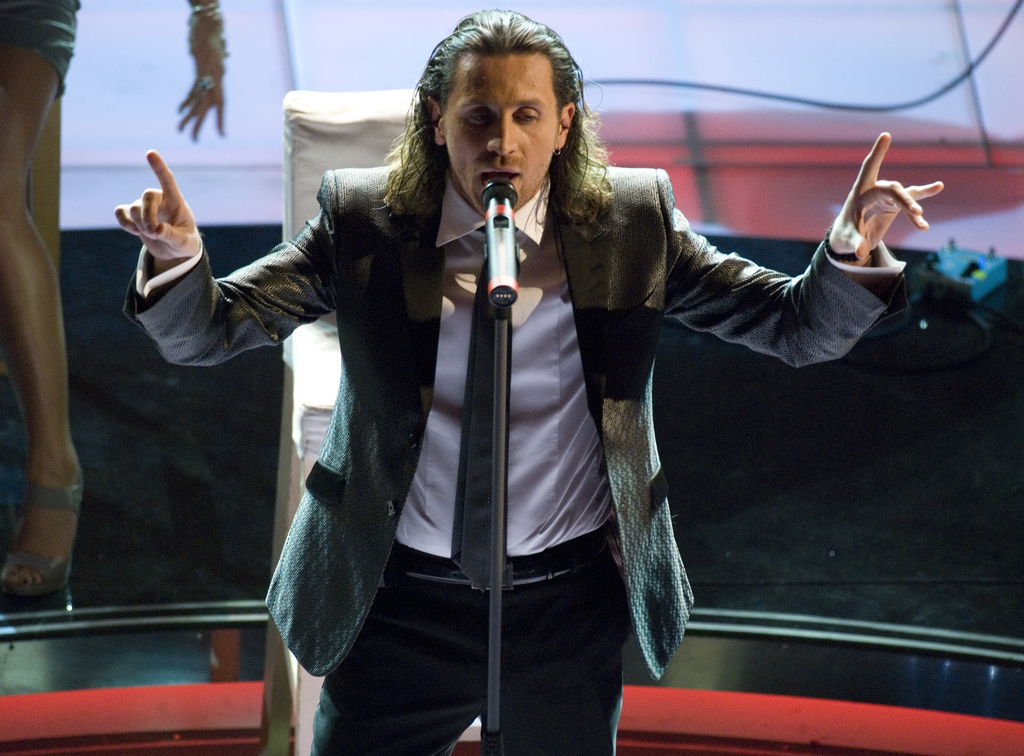
Povia, 2006 winner

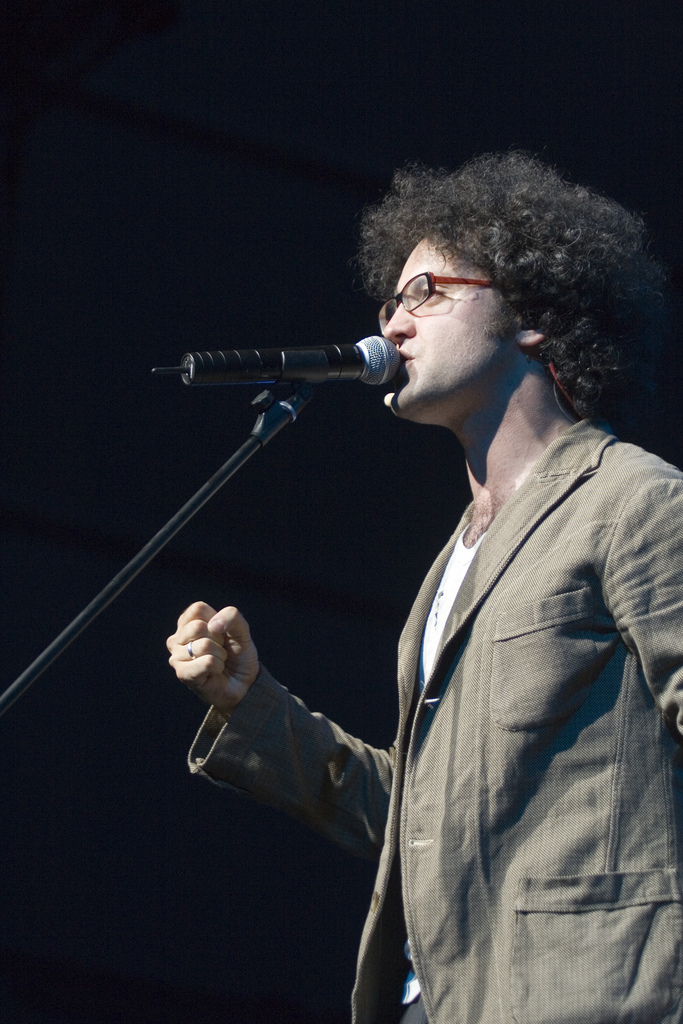
Simone Cristicchi, 2007 winner

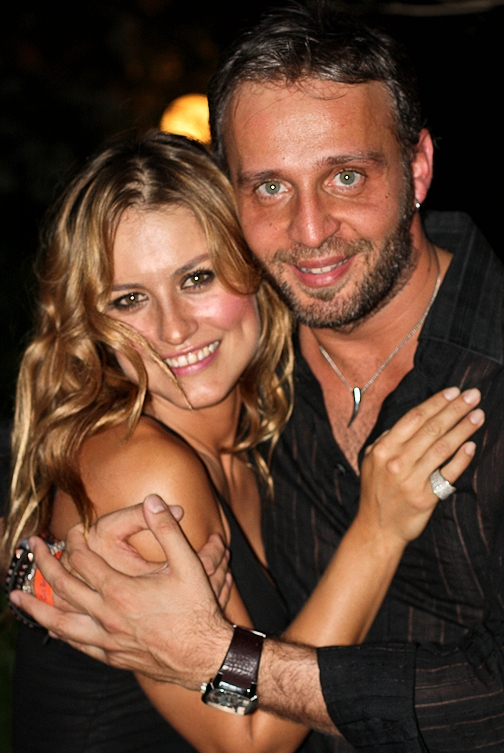
Giò Di Tonno and Lola Ponce, 2008 winners

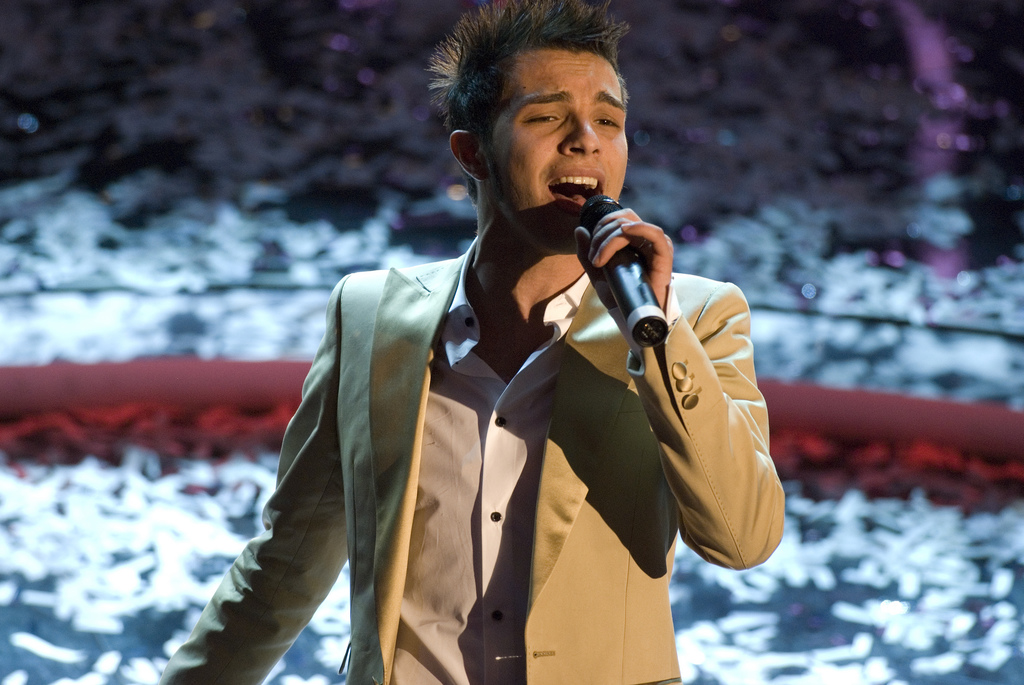
Marco Carta, 2009 winner

Year	Song	Artist	Peak chart positions											Certifications
Year	Song	Artist	ITA	AUT	BEL (FL)	BEL (WA)	FRA	GER	NLD	NOR	SWI	UK	US	Certifications
2000	"Sentimento"	Piccola Orchestra Avion Travel	9	—	—	—	—	—	—	—	—	—	—	
2001	"Luce (Tramonti a nord est)" (Note: Elisa's "Luce (Tramonti a nord est)" charted outside Italy in its English-language version, titled "Come Speak to Me".)	Elisa	1	—	— (Note: Elisa's "Come Speak to Me" did not chart on the Flemish Ultratop 50, but peaked at number 8 on the Flemish Ultratip chart.)	— (Note: Elisa's "Come Speak to Me" did not chart on the Walloon Ultratop 40, but peaked at number 12 on the Walloon Ultratip chart.)	—	—	91	—	70	—	—	FIMI: Platinum
2002	"Messaggio d'amore"	Matia Bazar	16	—	—	—	—	—	—	—	—	—	—	
2003	"Per dire di no"	Alexia	11	—	—	—	—	—	—	—	83	—	—	
2004	"L'uomo volante"	Marco Masini	8	—	—	—	—	—	—	—	—	—	—	
2005	"Angelo"	Francesco Renga	1	—	—	—	—	—	—	—	—	—	—	FIMI: Gold
2006	"Vorrei avere il becco"	Povia	— (Note: Povia's "Vorrei avere il becco" did not enter the FIMI Physical Singles Chart, which acted as the official Italian singles chart until the end of 2007, but in April 2006, one month after the release of the song, it debuted at number nine on the very first FIMI Top Digital Download chart.)	—	—	—	—	—	—	—	—	—	—	
2007	"Ti regalerò una rosa"	Simone Cristicchi	3	—	—	—	—	—	—	—	—	—	—	
2008	"Colpo di fulmine"	Giò Di Tonno & Lola Ponce	1	—	—	—	—	—	—	—	—	—	—	
2009	"La forza mia"	Marco Carta	2	—	—	—	—	—	—	—	—	—	—	
"—" denotes singles that did not chart or were not released

== 2010–2019 ==
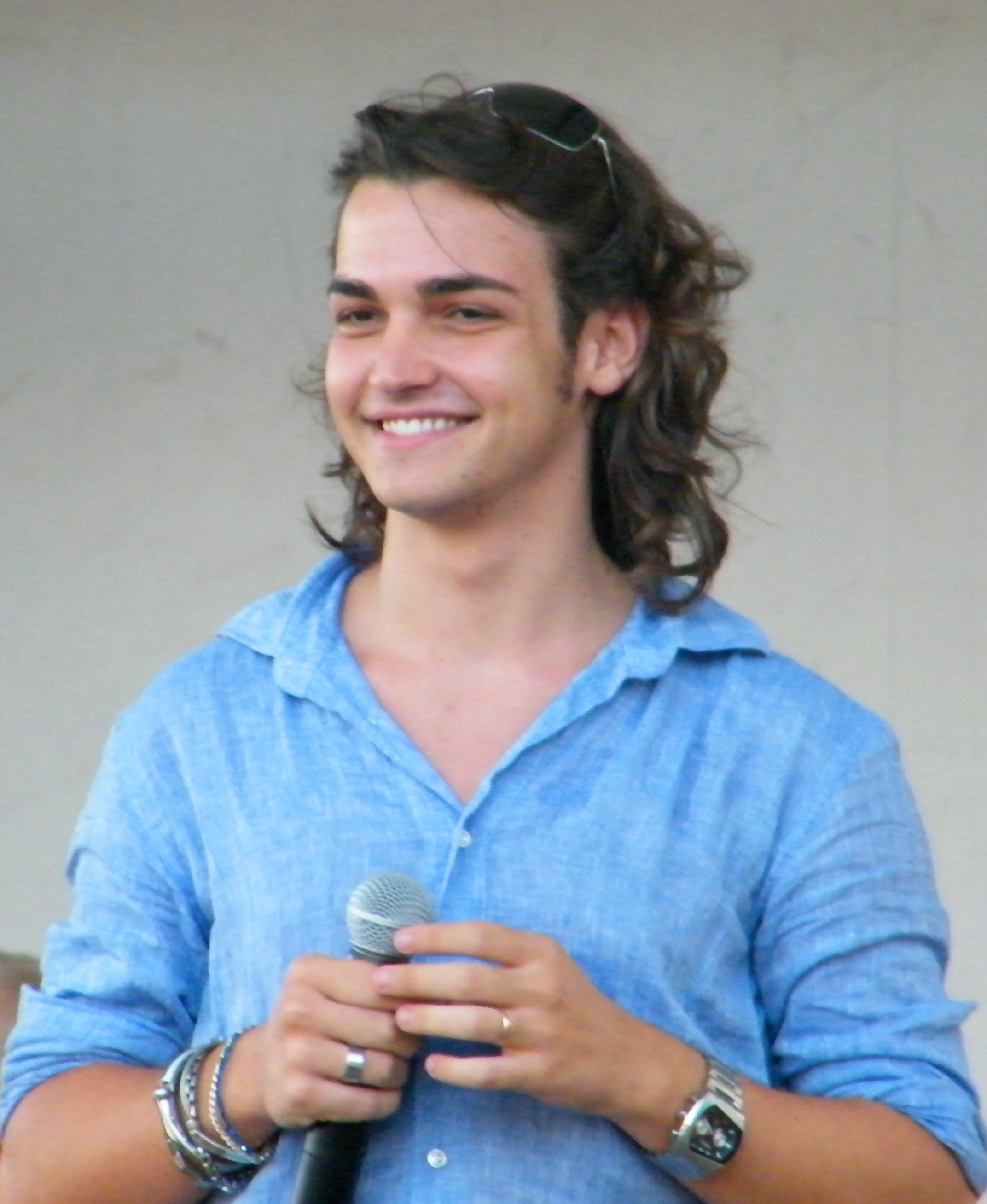
Valerio Scanu, 2010 winner

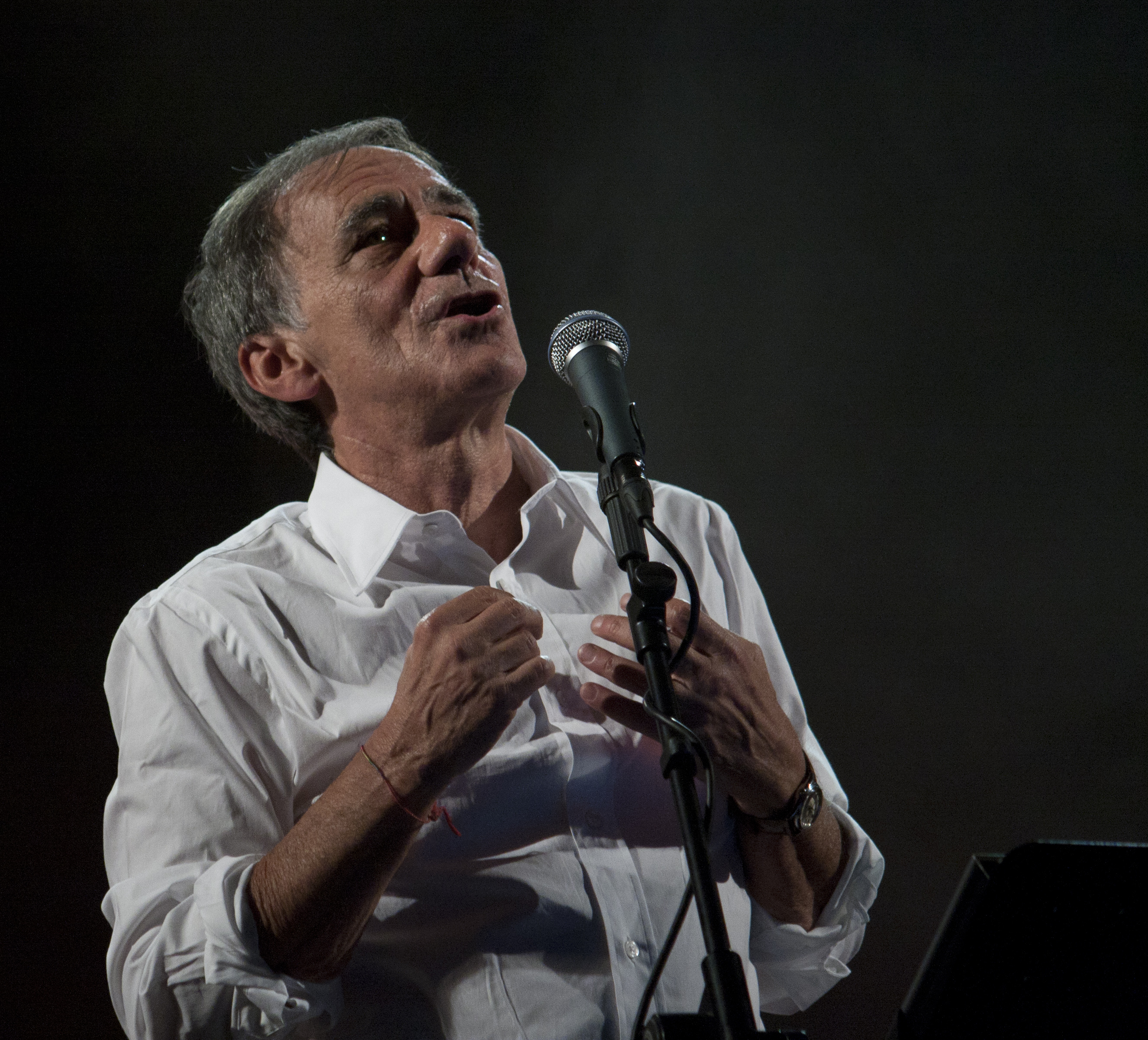
Roberto Vecchioni, 2011 winner

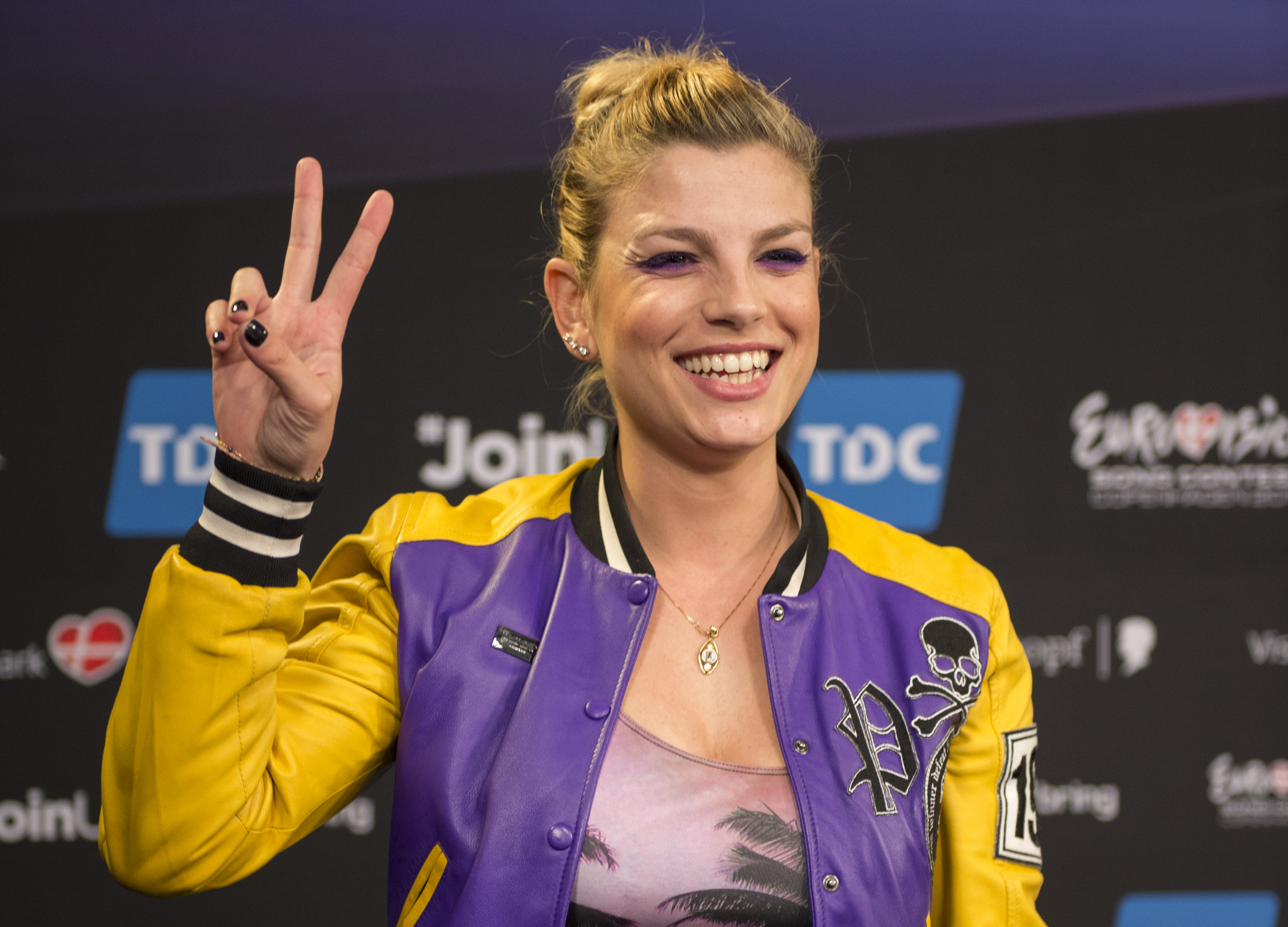
Emma, 2012 winner

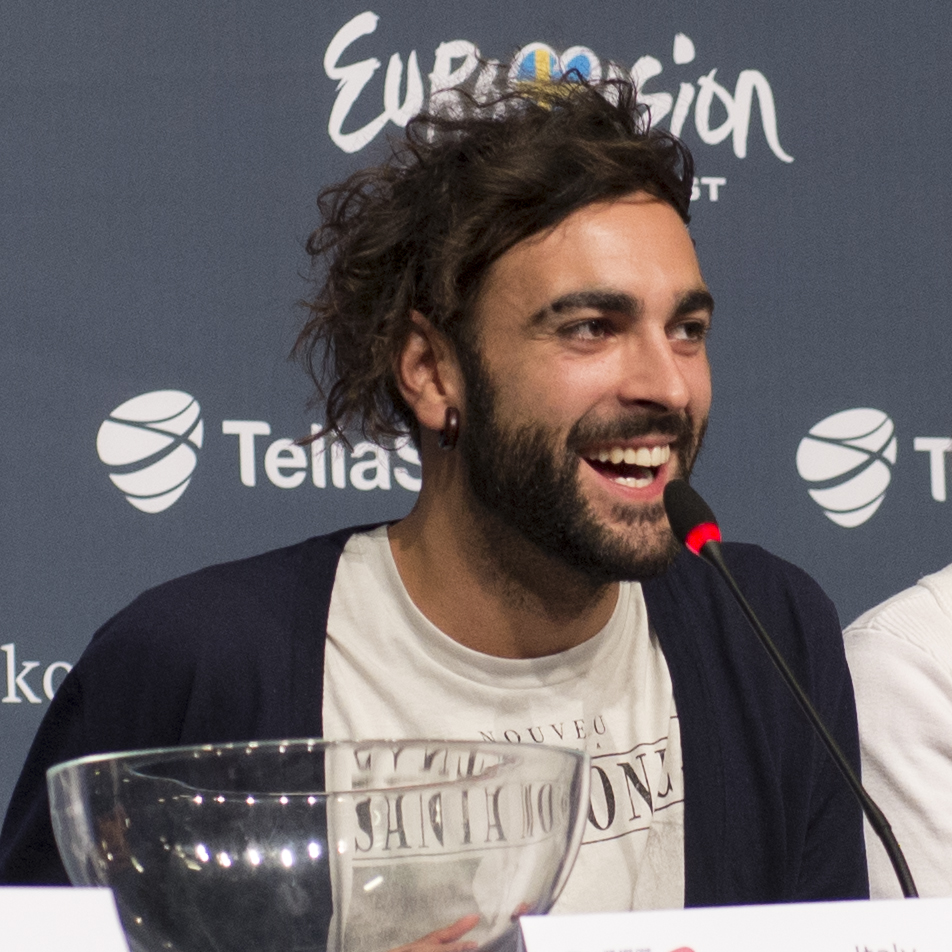
Marco Mengoni, 2013 winner

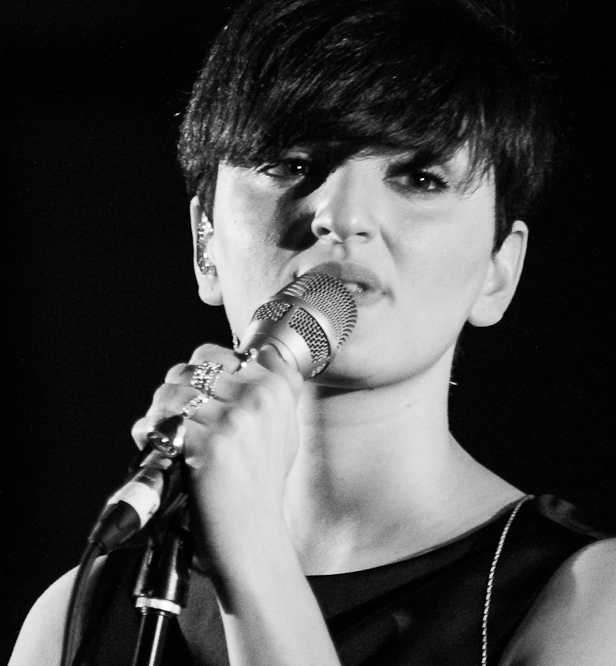
Arisa, 2014 winner

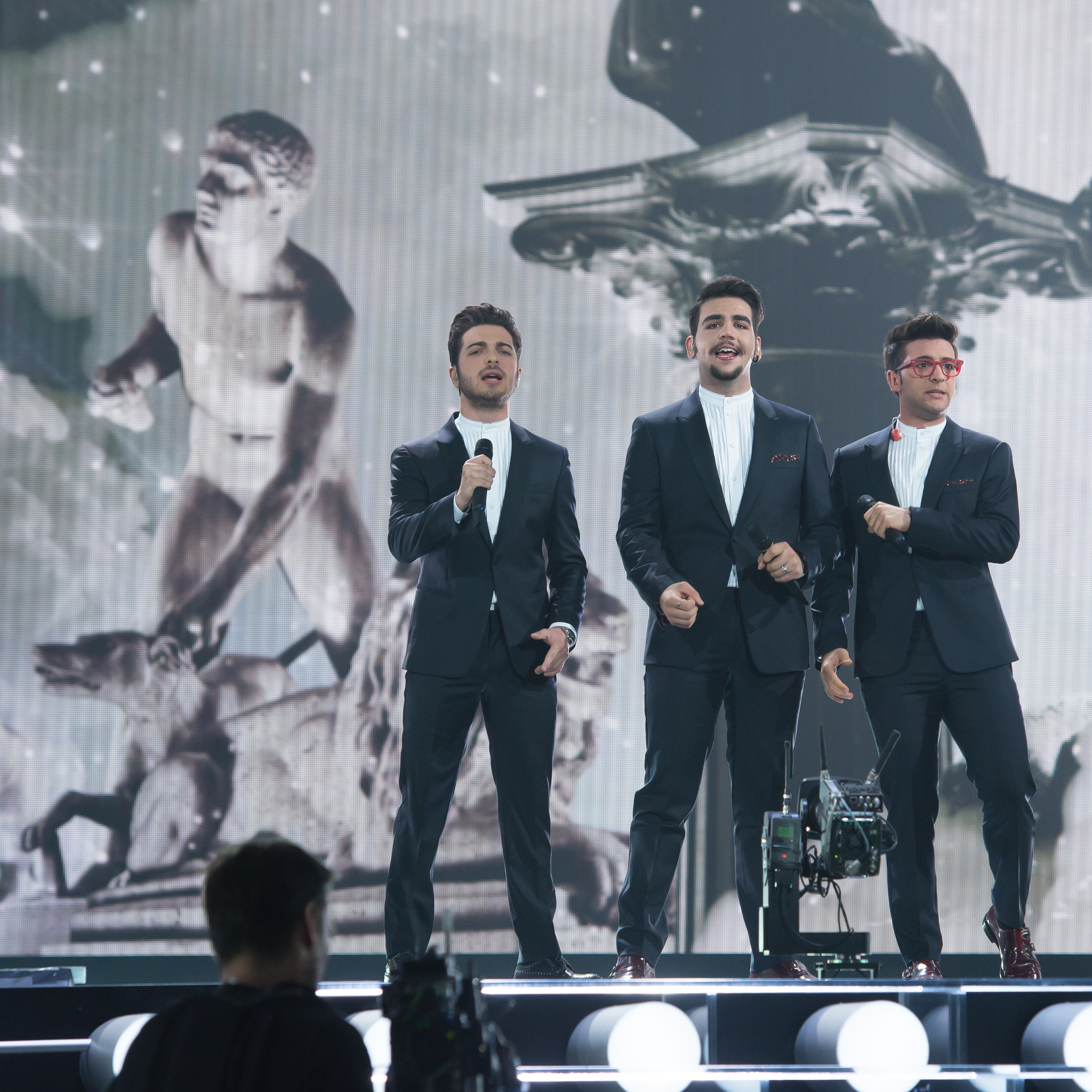
Il Volo, 2015 winners

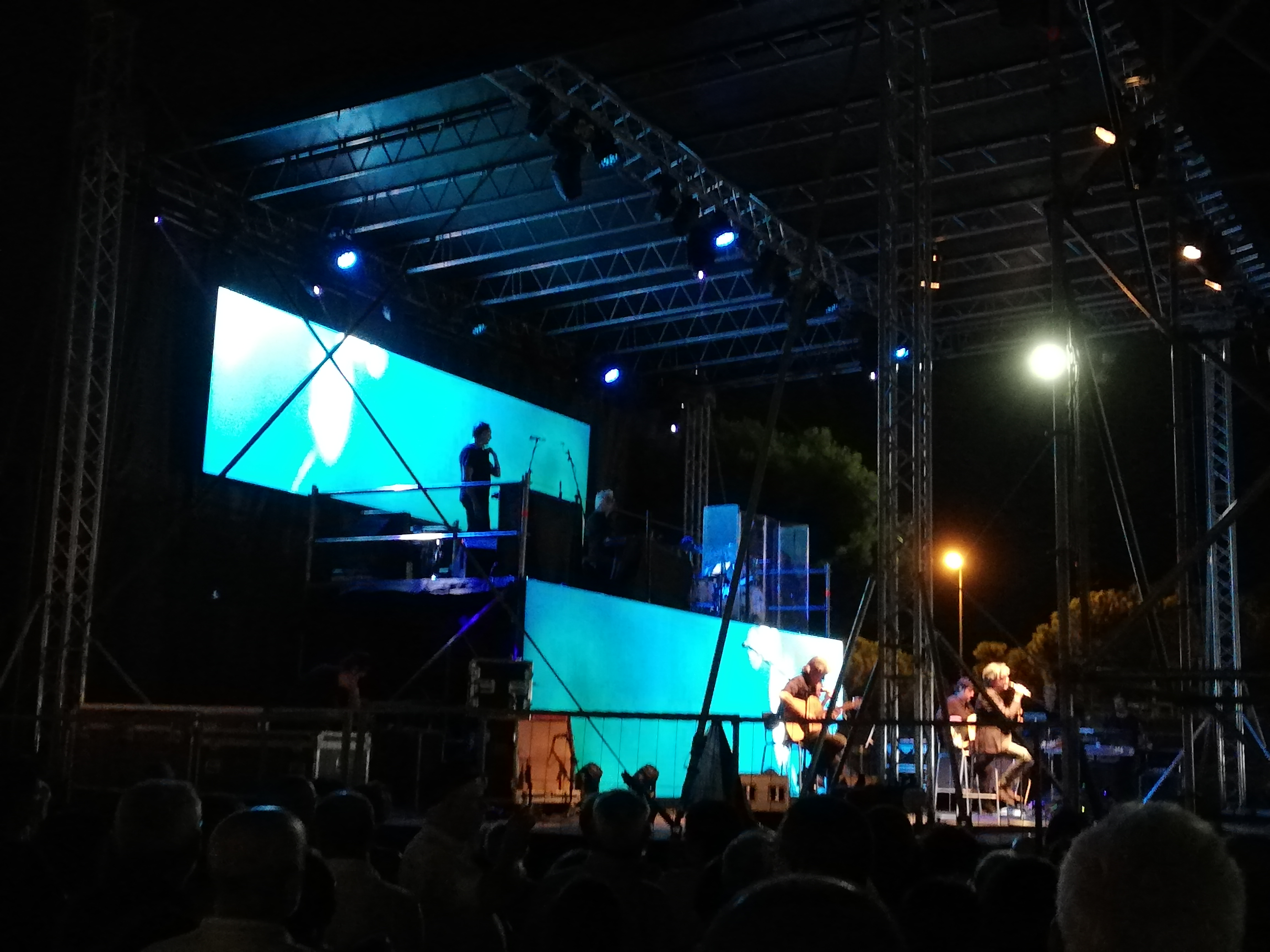
Stadio, 2016 winners

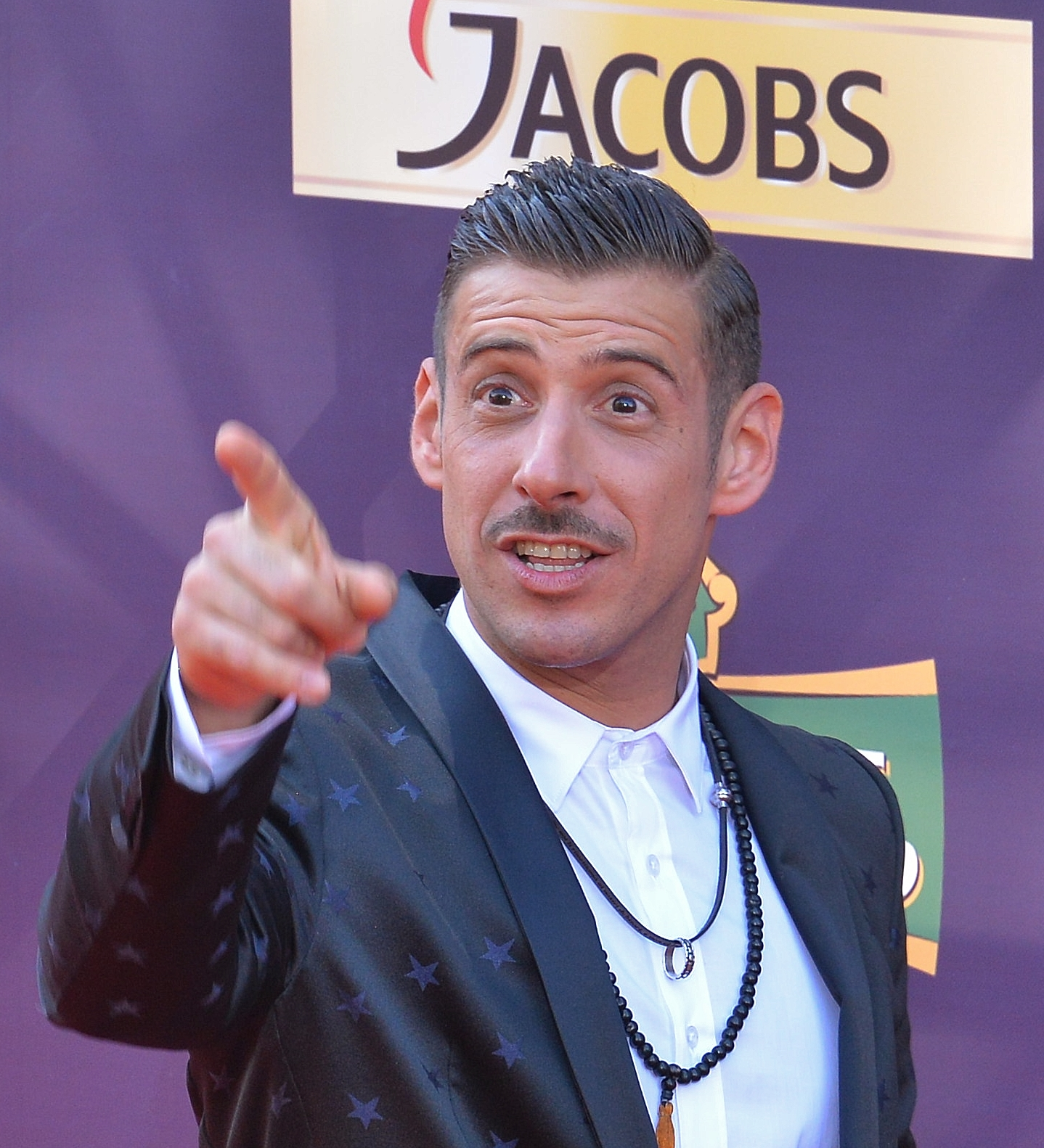
Francesco Gabbani, 2017 winner

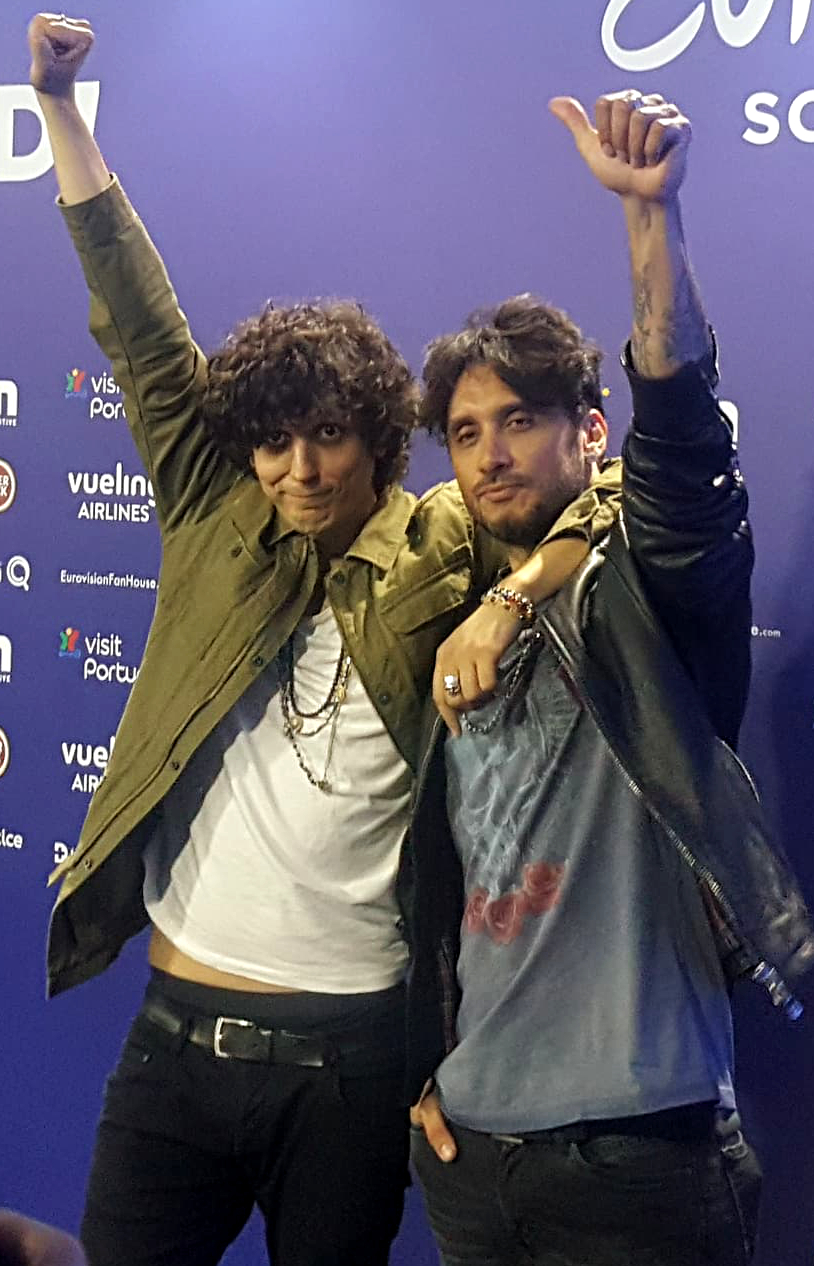
Ermal Meta and Fabrizio Moro, 2018 winners

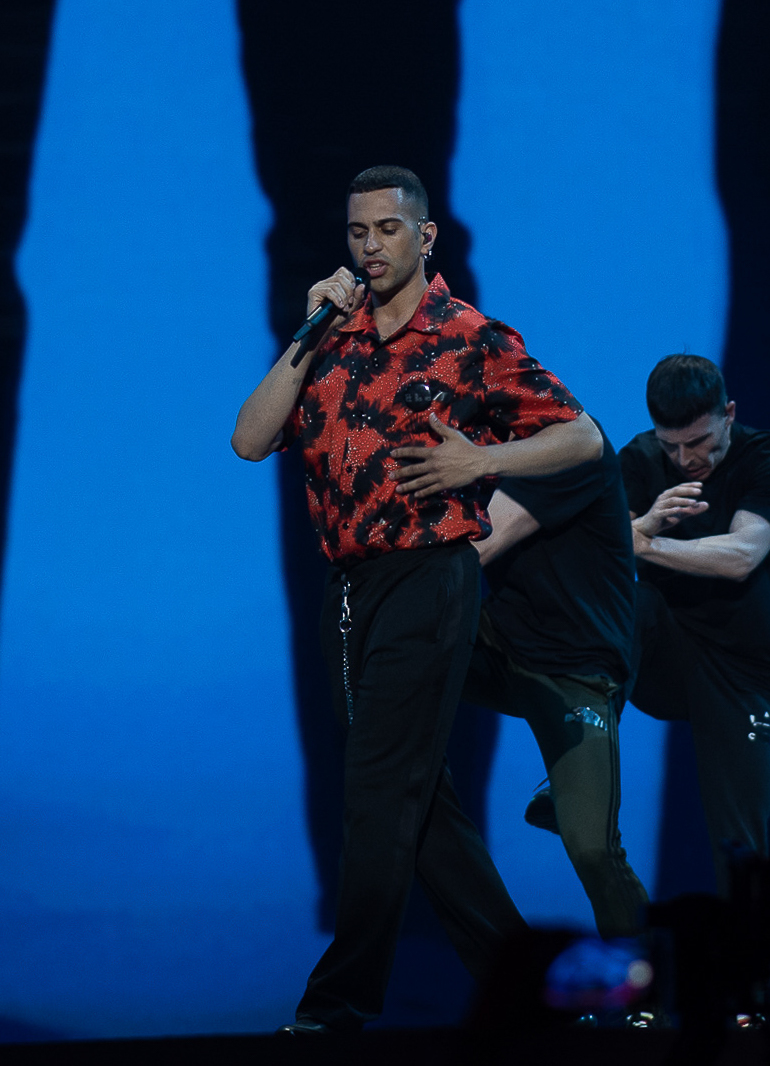
Mahmood, 2019 winner

Year	Song	Artist	Peak chart positions											Certifications
Year	Song	Artist	ITA	AUT	BEL (FL)	BEL (WA)	FRA	GER	NLD	NOR	SPA	SWI	UK	Certifications
2010	"Per tutte le volte che..."	Valerio Scanu	1	—	—	—	—	—	—	—	—	30	—	FIMI: Platinum
2011	"Chiamami ancora amore"	Roberto Vecchioni	2	—	—	—	—	—	—	—	—	—	—	FIMI: Gold
2012	"Non è l'inferno"	Emma	1	—	—	—	—	—	—	—	—	19	—	FIMI: 2× Platinum
2013	"L'essenziale"	Marco Mengoni	1	60	— (Note: Marco Mengoni's "L'essenziale" did not chart on the Flemish Ultratop 50, but peaked at number 31 on the Flemish Ultratip chart.)	— (Note: Marco Mengoni's "L'essenziale" did not chart on the Walloon Ultratop 50, but peaked at number 27 on the Walloon Ultratip chart.)	—	79	69	—	43	36	—	FIMI: 4× Platinum
2014	"Controvento"	Arisa	1	—	—	—	—	—	—	—	—	48	—	FIMI: Platinum
2015	"Grande amore"	Il Volo	1	5	50	42	145	54	—	—	—	19	—	FIMI: 2× Platinum
2016	"Un giorno mi dirai"	Stadio	3	—	—	—	—	—	—	—	—	—	—	FIMI: Gold
2017	"Occidentali's Karma"	Francesco Gabbani	1	57	—	—	110	—	—	—	14	25	—	FIMI: 6× Platinum
2018	"Non mi avete fatto niente"	Ermal Meta & Fabrizio Moro	2	—	—	—	134	—	—	—	—	16	—	FIMI: Platinum
2019	"Soldi"	Mahmood	1	12	50	— (Note: Mahmood's "Soldi" did not chart on the Walloon Ultratop 50, but peaked at number 26 on the Walloon Ultratip chart.)	67	32	18	16	5	5	73	FIMI: 4× Platinum; PROMUSICAE: 2× Platinum; SNEP: Gold
"—" denotes singles that did not chart or were not released

== 2020–present ==
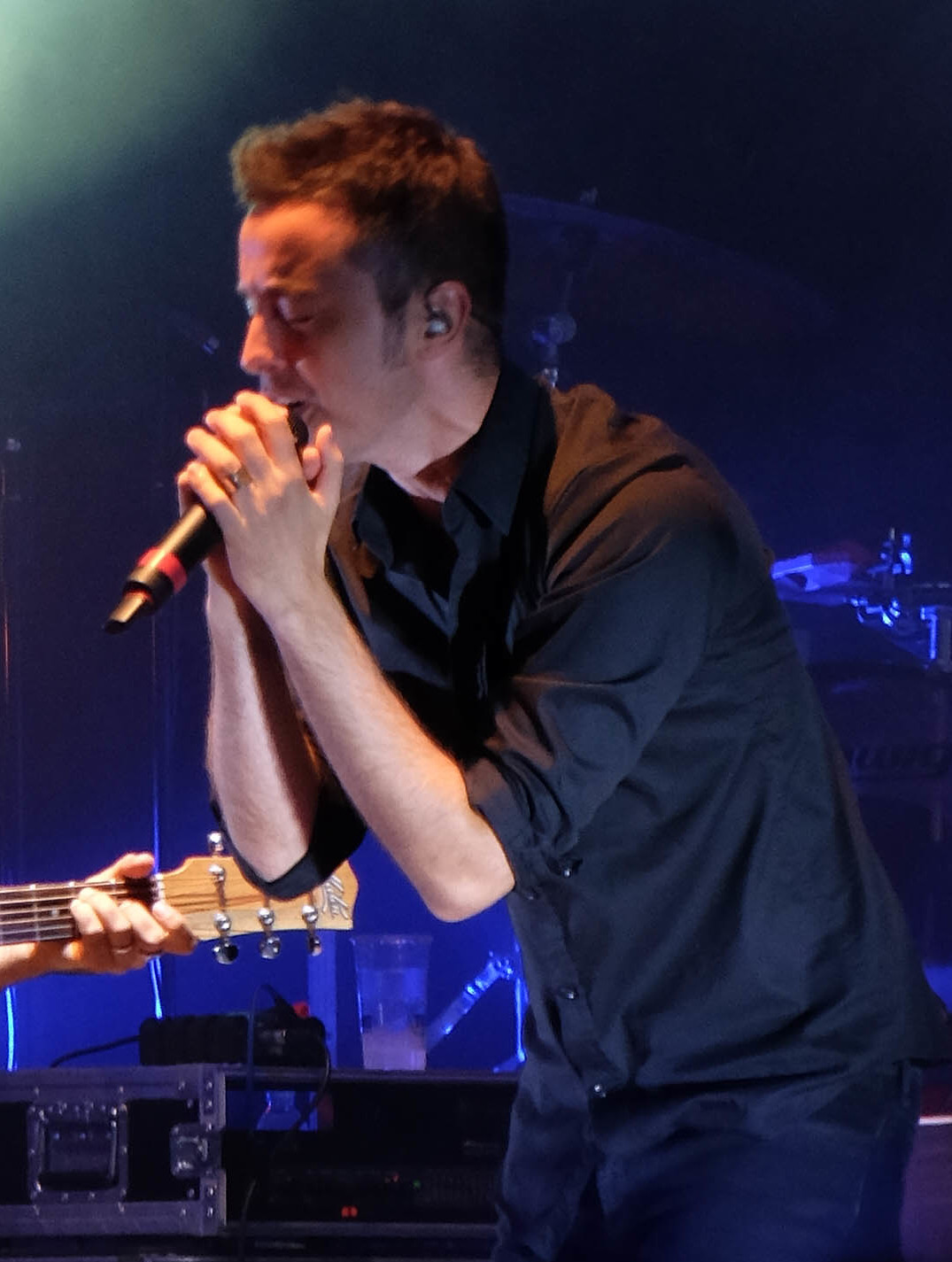
Diodato, 2020 winner

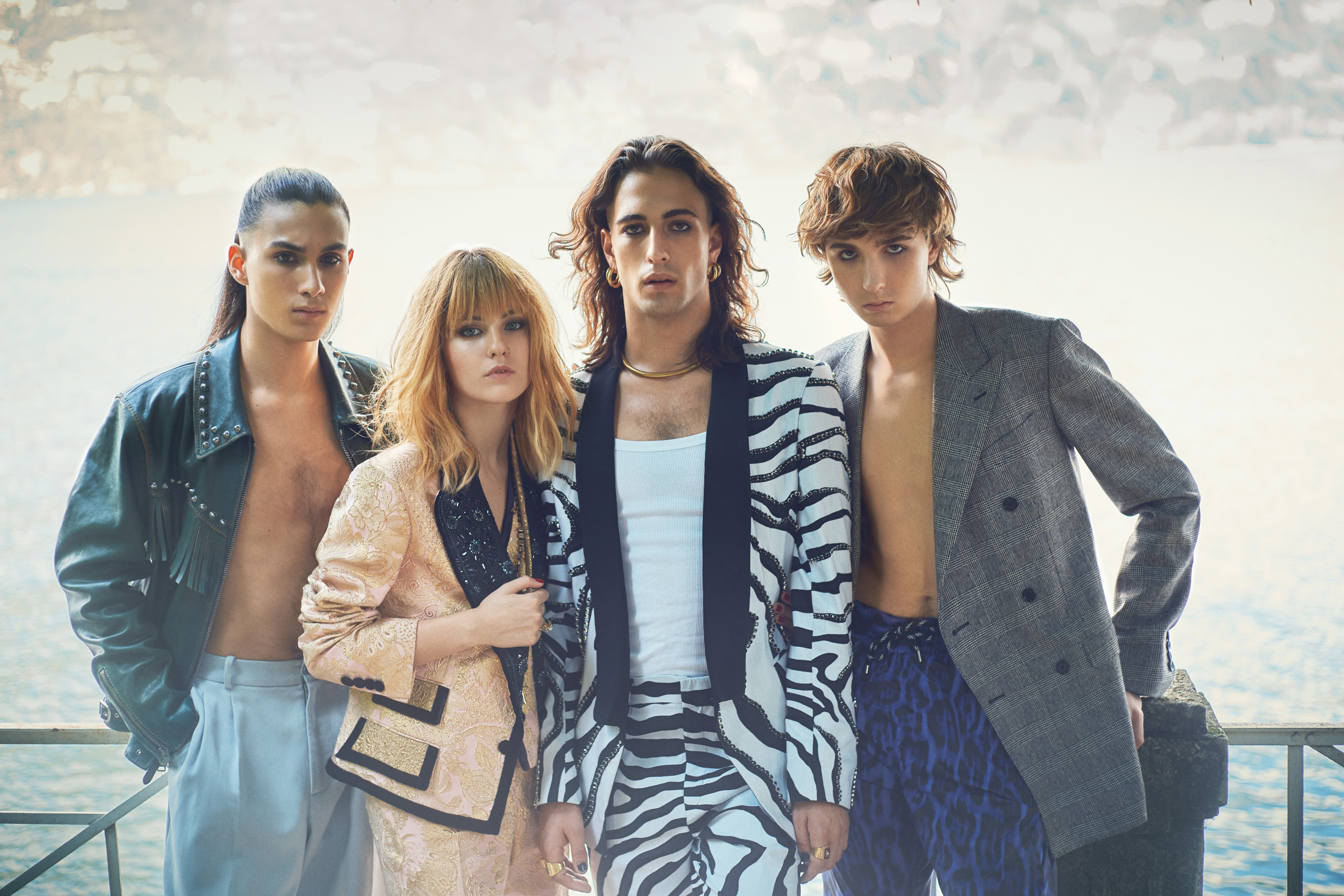
Måneskin, 2021 winners

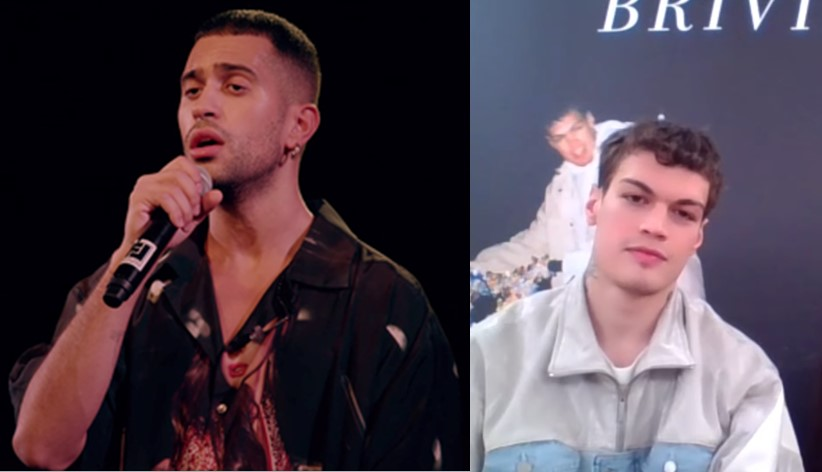
Mahmood and Blanco, 2022 winners

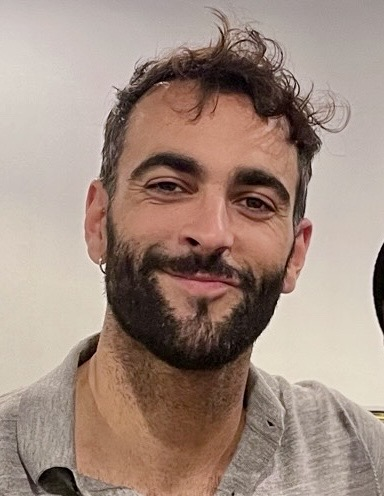
Marco Mengoni, 2023 winner

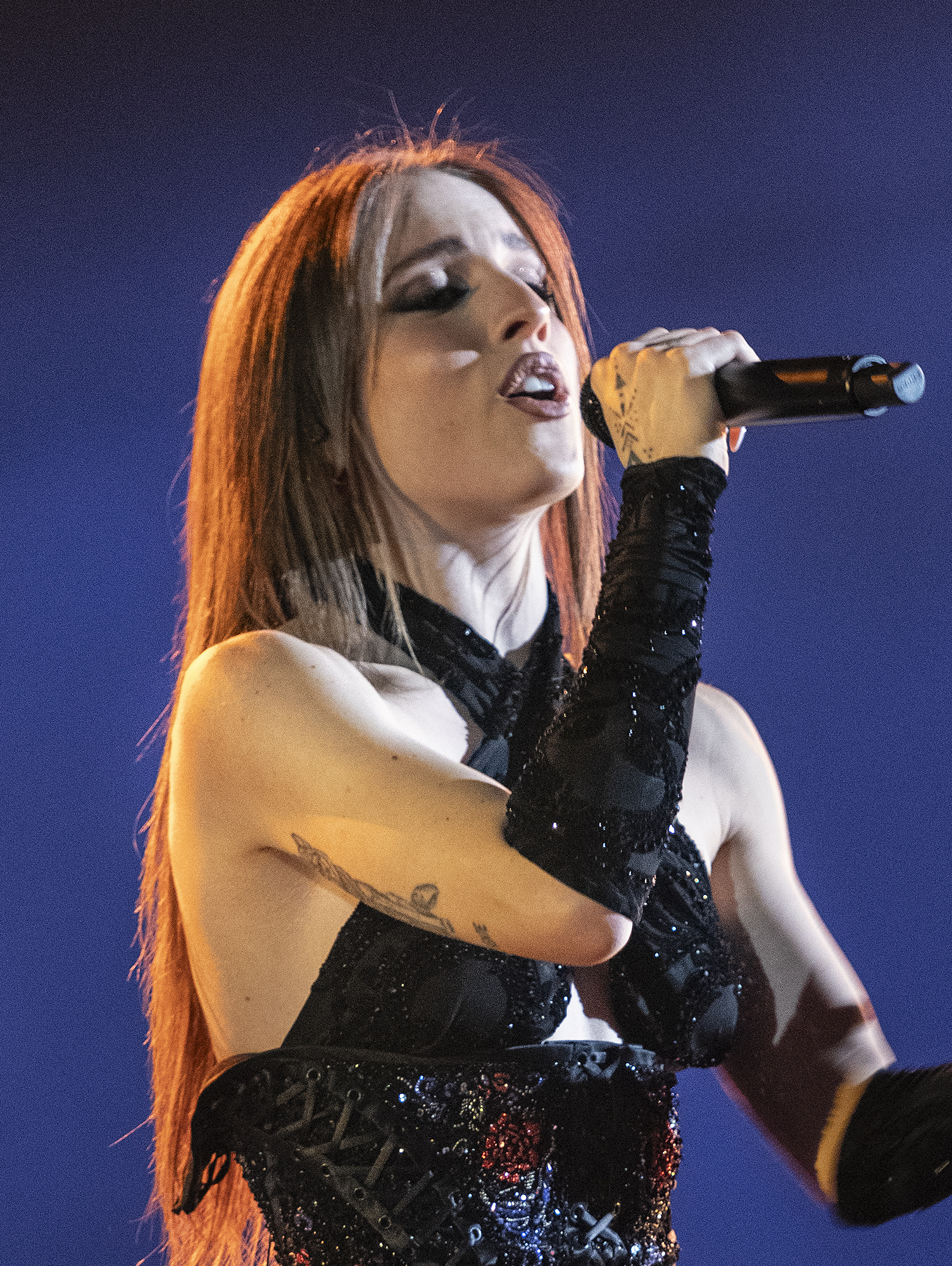
Angelina Mango, 2024 winner

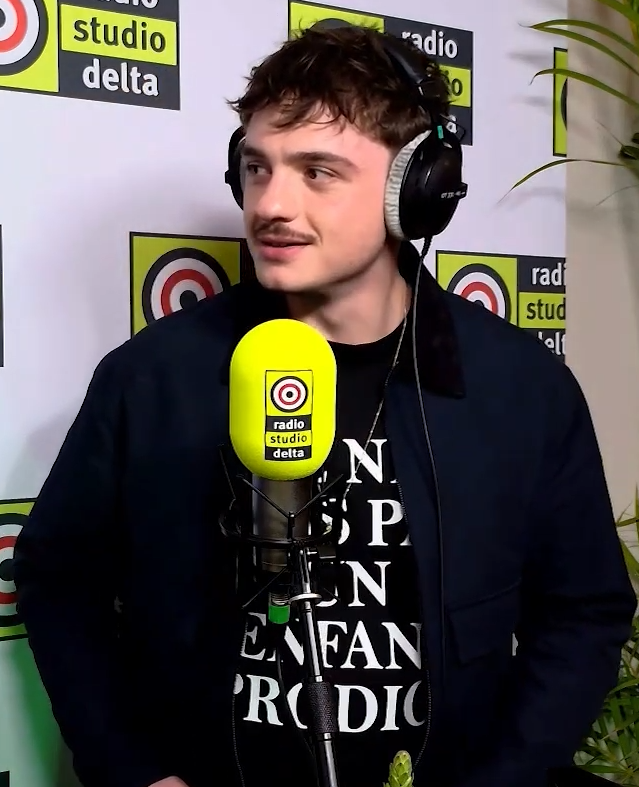
Olly, 2025 winner

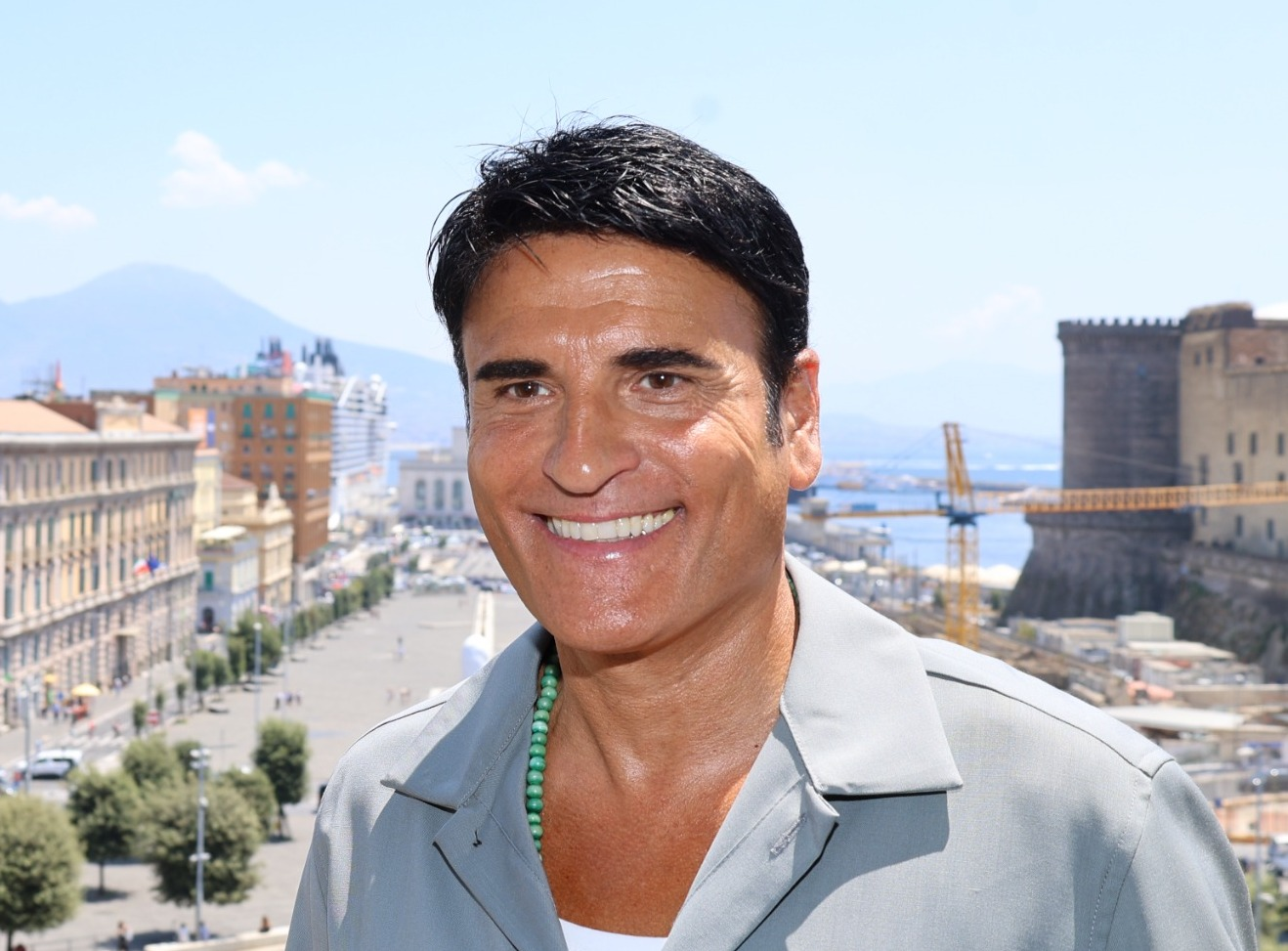
Sal Da Vinci, 2026 winner

Year	Song	Artist	Peak chart positions											Certifications
Year	Song	Artist	ITA	AUT	BEL (FL)	BEL (WA)	FRA	GER	NLD	NOR	SPA	SWI	UK	Certifications
2020	"Fai rumore"	Diodato	1	—	—	—	—	—	—	—	—	36	—	FIMI: 3× Platinum
2021	"Zitti e buoni"	Måneskin	2	2	2	43	107	9	1	2	16	2	17	FIMI: 5× Platinum; BEA: Platinum; BPI: Silver; BVMI: Gold; IFPI AUT: Platinum; IFPI SWI: Platinum; IFPI NOR: Platinum; PROMUSICAE: Platinum; SNEP: Gold
2022	"Brividi"	Mahmood & Blanco	1	—	—	—	—	—	— (Note: Mahmood and Blanco's "Brividi" did not chart on the Dutch Single Top 100, but peaked at number 24 on the Dutch Single Tip chart.)	—	95	1	— (Note: Mahmood and Blanco's "Brividi" did not chart on the UK Singles Chart, but peaked at number 67 on the UK Singles Sales Chart Top 100.)	FIMI: 8× Platinum
2023	"Due vite"	Marco Mengoni	1	50	—	—	—	— (Note: Marco Mengoni's "Due vite" did not chart on the German Top 100 Singles, but peaked at number 13 on the German Singles Downloads chart.)	— (Note: Marco Mengoni's "Due vite" did not chart on the Dutch Single Top 100, but peaked at number 29 on the Dutch Single Tip chart.)	—	—	2	— (Note: Marco Mengoni's "Due vite" did not chart on the UK Singles Chart, but peaked at number 42 on the UK Singles Sales Chart Top 100.)	FIMI: 6× Platinum; IFPI SWI: Gold
2024	"La noia"	Angelina Mango	4	57	—	—	—	—	63	—	79	11	— (Note: Angelina Mango's "La noia" did not chart on the UK Singles Chart, but peaked at number 56 on the UK Singles Sales Chart Top 100.)	FIMI: 3× Platinum
2025	"Balorda nostalgia"	Olly	1	—	—	—	—	—	—	—	—	6	—	FIMI: 4× Platinum; IFPI SWI: Gold
2026	"Per sempre sì"	Sal Da Vinci	2	18	—	—	—	—	—	—	—	21	— (Note: Sal Da Vinci's "Per sempre sì" did not chart on the UK Singles Chart, but peaked at number 45 on the UK Singles Sales Chart Top 100.)	FIMI: Platinum
"—" denotes singles that did not chart or were not released
