= Sweet Home Verona =

Live album by Sonohra
- Released: November 28, 2008 (Italy)
- Genre: Pop rock
- Label: Sony BMG

Sweet Home Verona is the title of the first live album from Sonohra, recorded September 6, 2008 during a concert at the Roman Theater in Verona.

The album, released November 28, 2008, contains songs from the album Liberi da Sempre rearranged in acoustic versions, and earned a Platinum Album. It is available either as a CD, DVD or CD+DVD.

The only covers present on the CD is The Thrill Is Gone by B.B. King; on the DVD, in addition, Sonohra performs covers of Sultan of Swing by Dire Straits, Livin' on a Prayer by Bon Jovi, Crying at the Discotheque by Alcazar and Sweet Home Chicago by the Blues Brothers. The DVD also contains the English version of the song L'amore, called Love is Here.

== Tracks ==
=== CD ===
1. "Liberi da sempre"
2. "Love Show"
3. "Sono io"
4. "Immagine"
5. "5000 mini mani"
6. "I Believe"
7. "English Dance"
8. "So la donna che sei"
9. "L'amore"
10. "Thrill Is Gone"
11. "Io e te"
12. "Salvami"

=== DVD ===
1. "Liberi da sempre"
2. "Love Show"
3. "Sono io"
4. "L’immagine"
5. "5mila mini mani"
6. "Sweet Home Chicago"
7. "I believe"
8. "English Dance"
9. "Livin' on a Prayer"
10. "So la donna che sei"
11. "L’amore"
12. "Sultans of Swing"
13. "The Thrill is Gone"
14. "Io e te"
15. "Crying at the Discotheque"
16. "Love is here"
17. "Salvami"
