= Colpo di fulmine (song) =

Single by Giò Di Tonno and Lola Ponce
- B-side: "Colpo di fulmine (Instrumental)"
- Released: February 2008
- Label: MusiZa
- Songwriter: Gianna Nannini

Audio
- "Colpo di fulmine" on YouTube

"Colpo di fulmine" (transl. "Love at first sight", lit. "Lightning strike") is a 2008 song composed by Gianna Nannini and performed by Giò Di Tonno and Lola Ponce. It won the 58th edition of the Sanremo Music Festival.

== Background ==
The song was originally composed by Nannini for her rock opera Pia de' Tolomei, based on the Italian noblewoman known for her appearance in Dante Alighieri's Divine Comedy. Producer David Zard then considered the song fitting for the Festival, and a good opportunity to promote the show. Di Tonno and Ponce were chosen out of popularity they got for having played Quasimodo and Esmeralda in Riccardo Cocciante's successful stage musical Notre-Dame de Paris.

The song has been described as "epic and catchy at the same time". It was a commercial success, being certified double platinum.

== Track listing ==
No.	Title	Length
1.	"Colpo di fulmine"	3:51
2.	"Colpo di fulmine (Instrumental)"	3:51

== Charts ==
Chart	Peak position
Italy (FIMI)	1
