= Sonohra =

Italian musical duo

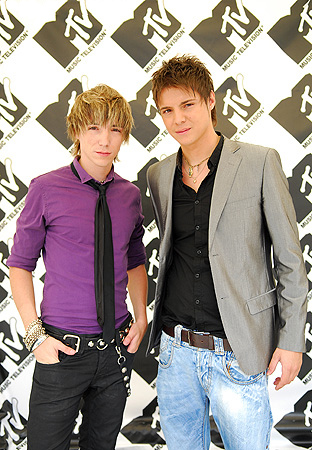

Background information
- Origin: Verona, Italy
- Genres: Pop rock
- Years active: 2003–present
- Label: Sony Music
- Members: Luca Fainello; Diego Fainello
- Website: www.sonohra.it

Sonohra is an Italian pop duo constituted by the brothers Diego and Luca Fainello, native to the city of Verona. They were the winners of the Newcomers section of the 2008 Sanremo Festival.

== Beginnings ==
Luca and Diego Fainello are two brothers who were born in an artistic family in Verona, Italy. Their father was an artistic photographer and bass guitar player in a band, their mother was a singer and their grandfather, violinist, entrusting to the boys an infallible tool. This formation from house materialized in the Academy of Art of Verona. Luca, being the oldest, was the first one in seriously choosing music as a path to be followed. His decision in a certain way was the biggest catalyst for Diego, gradually taking him in the same direction. At first they were known under the name 2ttO when they sang the theme song of the program UFO Baby and that way they published a single called Grido e Canto. Then more mature, with 24 and 20 years, they change their name into 'Domino' and recorded the song "Come tu mi vuoi", before publishing their first music video. They also used to play in bars of their hometown Verona songs of musicians like Bryan Adams, Bon Jovi, B.B. King, Dire Straits, among others.

== Sanremo Festival ==
In 2007 an English girl on a tour in Venice inspired Luca to write the lyrics to the song "L'amore", which was produced by Roberto Tini. With this one they entered the Sanremo Music Festival 2008 (now with the name Sonohra), a contest of Italian music from the city of San Remo in the "Giovani" (Newcomers) category and the night of their presentation Sonohra gave a performance as if it was their last spectacle. And before the festival was concluded, the two brothers turned out to be crowned “Best artist revelation”, giving place to an explosion of popularity difficult to articulate. On February 29, 2008, their album Liberi da sempre was published, sending Luca and Diego in a gigantic tour along Italy.

After winning in the category Best New Artist on May 15, 2008, in the TRL Awards (2008) in Naples, on the following day their second single, of their debut album, Love Show was launched. Finally, the third single Salvami was published on September 5. The song talks about a good friend that the brothers lost in a traffic accident, sending a very strong message against drinking and driving.

They also won in the categories Best Band and Best New Act in the Italian Nickelodeon's Kids Choice Awards (for which they did the theme song with Love Show changing the lyrics) and in the MTV Europe Music Awards they were named in the category of Best Italian Act.

== First CD/DVD ==
In November 2008, their first CD/DVD Live was published with the name Sweet Home Verona. It was filmed on September 6 in the Roman Theater in Verona. The songs in this CD/DVD are accompanied only by chordophones and violins. The DVD placed them suddenly in first place of the Italian DVD-Charts and also between the Top 30 of the Album - market forecast.

On March 17, 2009, Libres was published in Latin America, the Spanish version of the album Liberi da sempre. They made a big effort, since they are only fluent in Italian. Recording in Spanish represented a real challenge, forcing them to train and be able to get connected in a vocal and emotional level in a foreign language. The first launched single of the album was Besos Faciles, the version in Spanish of the song Love Show with three Bonus Tracks: L'amore (Italian), Io e te (Italian) and Love Show (English). With this album the duo reached the following positions in the lists of Latin America: Costa Rica (#10), Mexico (#25), Argentina (#35) and Chile (#79). For the presentation and promotion of their album they traveled on March 22 to Latin America and gave concerts in almost all the countries (Puerto Rico, Venezuela, Colombia, Chile, Argentina, Mexico and the United States, among others).

On May 14, they traveled back home to Italy and received in the TRL Awards 2009 in Trieste (in which they played the English version of their song Io e te) the award in the category Best square-filler (Riempipiazza). On June 30, 2009, Sonohra organized a benefit concert at Carpi (Modena) to help the victims of the earthquake in Abruzzo.

== Second Latin America tour ==
During their second visit to Latin America, in July and August 2009, they collaborated with the Mexican singer Yuridia on the song "Todas Las Noches". This song is on her album "Nada es color de rosa", which was released October 13, 2009. They also visited Brazil for the first time to promote their Brazilian Album "Love Show", an album containing Italian songs and songs translated into English from their debut CD "Liberi da Sempre". Their success in Latin America soon paid off, on October 15, 2009, they won the Best New Artist award at the Los Premios MTV Latinoamérica, becoming the first Italians to win at the ceremony.

== Second album ==
On September 24, 2009, Sonohra left for London to record their second album. They recorded their album in Abbey Road Studio, the same studio used by the Beatles. During work on their second album, they still continued to promote their debut album in other countries. On December 2, 2009, they released the CD L'Amore in Japan. This CD, similar to their Brazilian CD, includes Italian songs and songs translated into English from their debut CD Liberi da Sempre. It also includes a never before released song called "Fiore di Neve", a cover of the Japanese song "Yuki no Hana".

== Discography ==
=== Albums ===
- 2008 - Liberi da Sempre ( Ita: Platinum; 100,000+ )
- 2008 - Sweet Home Verona (Live CD/DVD)( Ita : Platinum: 60,000+ )
- 2009 - Libres (Spanish version of "Liberi da Sempre")
- 2009 - Love Show (Brazilian release of "Liberi da Sempre")
- 2009 - L'Amore (Japanese release of "Liberi da Sempre")
- 2010 - Metà ( Ita : Gold: 30,000+ )
- 2012 - La Storia Parte da Qui (Ita: 4th Best Selling Album on iTunes)
- 2014 - Il Viaggio
- 2018 - L'ultimo grande eroe

=== EPs ===
- 2010 - A Place for Us

=== Singles ===
- 2008 - "L'Amore"
- 2008 - "Love Show"
- 2008 - "Salvami"
- 2009 - "Besos Fáciles"
- 2009 - "Buscando l'Amor"
- 2009 - "Seguimi o Uccidimi"
- 2010 - "Baby"
- 2010 - "Good Luck My Friend"
- 2010 - "There's a Place for Us"
- 2012 - "The Sky Is Yours"
- 2012 - "Si Chiama Libertà"
- 2012 - "Il Cielo è Tuo"
- 2012 - "Il Re del Nulla"

=== Collaborations ===
- 2009 - Todas Las Noches feat. Yuridia
- 2012 - Si Chiama Libertà feat. Hevià
- 2012 - Il Re Del Nulla feat. Micheal Adrian
- 2012 - Nuda Fino All'eternita feat. Secondhand Serenade

== Nominations and awards ==
Awards won in bold.

- 2008 - **Sanremo Music Festival - Category "Young"**
- 2008 - **Italian TRL Awards 2008 - Best New Artist**
- 2008 - **Nickelodeon Kids' Choice Awards - Storm of the Year with "L'amore"**
- 2008 - **Gold Disc: 50.000 copies sold of the debut album "Liberi da sempre"**
- 2008 - **Platinum Disc: 75.000 copies sold of the debut album "Liberi da sempre"**
- 2008 - Giffoni All Music - "Teen Awards"
- 2008 - MTV Europe Music Awards 2008: Candidates in the category Best Italian Act
- 2009 - **Gold Disc "Sweet Home Verona"**
- 2009 - **Platinum Disc "Sweet Home Verona"**
- 2009 - **Italian TRL Awards - Best Riempipiazza**
- 2009 - **Wind Music Awards - Premio Fondazione Arena di Verona**
- 2009 - **Los Premios MTV Latinoamérica 2009 - "Artista Revelaciòn"**
- 2009 - Los Premios MTV Latinoamérica 2009 - Fashionista Award - Male (Diego nominated)
- 2010 - Premio Lo Nuestro 2010 "Artista Revelaciòn"
- 2010 - MTV MY TRL Video (nomination)
- 2010 - Italian TRL Awards 2010 - "Best Fan Club" (nomination)
- 2010 - **Wind Music Awards - F.I.M.I. Award for Young Artist**
- 2010 - **Premio Roiggep Band d'Italia**
- 2010 - **Coca-Cola Live @ MTV - The Summer Song with Good Luck My Friend**
- 2010 - MTV Europe Music Awards 2010 - Best Italian Act (nomination)

Awards and achievements
Preceded by Fabrizio Moro with "Pensa"	Sanremo Music Festival; Winner Newcomers section 2008	Succeeded by Arisa with "Sincerità"
