= Liberi da sempre =

Studio album by Sonohra
- Released: 29 February 2008
- Genre: Pop
- Length: 43 min : 52 s
- Language: Italian
- Label: Sony BMG
- Producer: Roberto Tini

Sonohra chronology
Liberi da sempre (2008)	Sweet Home Verona (2008)

Liberi da sempre is the debut album of the Italian band Sonohra, winners of the "Giovani" category at the Sanremo Music Festival 2008.

The disc reached the sixth spot in the Italian charts with the first single from the album being L'amore, the song that won them first place at the Festival of Sanremo. L'amore reached the 16th spot on the Italian charts for singles. This album received a Gold Disc for having sold over 50,000 copies in Italy and in June a "limited edition" of the CD was released that included a DVD.

== Tracks ==
=== Standard Version ===
1. Love Show - 3:55
2. L'amore - 3:48
3. English Dance - 4:11
4. Liberi da sempre - 3:46
5. Cinquemila mini mani - 3:14
6. Salvami - 5:56
7. Io e te - 3:42
8. So la donna che sei - 3:53
9. L'immagine - 3:33
10. Sono io - 4:11
11. I Believe - 3:46

=== Limited edition ===
==== CD ====
1. Love Show - 3:55
2. L'amore - 3:49
3. English Dance - 4:11
4. Liberi da sempre - 3:46
5. Cinquemila mini mani - 3:14
6. Salvami - 5:56
7. Io e te - 3:42
8. So la donna che sei - 3:53
9. L'immagine - 3:34
10. Sono io - 4:11
11. I Believe - 3:45

==== DVD ====
1. “L’Amore” (video)
2. “L’Amore” (video backstage)
3. “Liberi Da Sempre” (video)
4. Video of the presentation at Sanremo Music Festival 2008
5. Instore Tour video-diario
6. Video of the winner of the contest "L'amore: my version"

== Charts ==
Chart (2008)	Position
Classifica album Italia	6
