= L'amore (Sonohra song) =

Single by Sonohra

from the album Liberi da sempre
- Released: 26 February 2008 (Italy)
- Genre: Pop rock
- Length: 3:49
- Label: Sony BMG
- Songwriters: Luca Fainello; Diego Fainello; Roberto Tini
- Producer: Roberto Tini

"L'amore" is a song by Italian duo Sonohra, released as their debut single in February 2008, and included in their first studio album, titled Liberi da sempre. The song was the group's Sanremo Music Festival 2008 entry, and won the competition in the Newcomers' section. A Spanish-language version of the song, titled "Buscando l'amor", was also recorded by the band and featured on their album Libres. Sonohra also translated and recorded the song in English, under the title "Love Is Here". In 2022, "L'amore" was re-recorded and re-released to Italian radio stations.

The song received the award for Tormentone dell'anno (Catchphrase of the year) at the 2008 Italian Nickelodeon Kids' Choice Awards.

== Background ==
The song was written by producer Roberto Tini and Sonohra members Diego Fainello and Luca Fainello. The duo revealed that "L'amore" was inspired by an English girl they met while playing in pubs, before they rose to fame with their music. Luca fell in love with her at first sight, but the girl had to come back to England after one day only. Therefore, the song's lyrics "describe a lovestory, which is impossible due to the distance between two people who don't know anything about each other, and live too far to manage to deepen their connection".

== Music video ==
The music video for the song was filmed on the Cliffs of Moher, in Ireland, by director Antonella Schioppa. During an interview, the band claimed they felt the Irish landscape was a good choice to describe the personal experience the song is based on.

== Charts ==
Chart (2008)	Peak position
Italy (FIMI)	6

== Certifications ==
Region	Certification	Certified units/sales
Italy (FIMI)	Gold	50,000^{‡}
^{‡} Sales+streaming figures based on certification alone.
