= Sanremo Music Festival 2008 =

Italian song contest (58th edition)

- La parola alla musica

Dates and venue
- Semi-final 1: 25 February 2008
- Semi-final 2: 26 February 2008
- Semi-final 3: 28 February 2008
- Semi-final 4: 29 February 2008
- Final: 1 March 2008
- Venue: Teatro Ariston; Sanremo, Italy

Production
- Broadcaster: Radiotelevisione italiana (RAI)
- Director: Gino Landi
- Musical director: Pippo Caruso
- Artistic director: Pippo Baudo
- Presenters: Pippo Baudo and Piero Chiambretti, Bianca Guaccero, Andrea Osvárt

Vote
- Voting system: Mixed (popular jury, "quality jury" and televotes)

Big Artists section
- Number of entries: 20
- Winner: "Colpo di fulmine" Giò Di Tonno & Lola Ponce

Newcomers' section
- Number of entries: 14
- Winner: "L'amore"; Sonohra

The Sanremo Music Festival 2008 (Italian: Festival di Sanremo 2008), officially the 58th Italian Song Festival (58º Festival della canzone italiana), was the 58th Sanremo Music Festival, held at the Teatro Ariston in Sanremo and broadcast by Radiotelevisione italiana (RAI). The first and the second night of the show were held on 25 and 26 February 2008, while the last three nights were held from 28 February and 1 March 2008. The contest was presented by Pippo Baudo and Piero Chiambretti with Bianca Guaccero and Andrea Osvárt.

The competition included two different sections. The Big Artists section, featuring 20 established singers, was won by the duo composed of Giò Di Tonno and Lola Ponce with the song "Colpo di fulmine", while the newcomers' section, featuring 14 debuting or little known artists, was won by Sonohra with "L'amore".

The festival received poor ratings compared previous editions. All of the five nights of the show were watched by less than 10,000,000 people, the worst result in the contest's history.

== Presenters and personnel ==
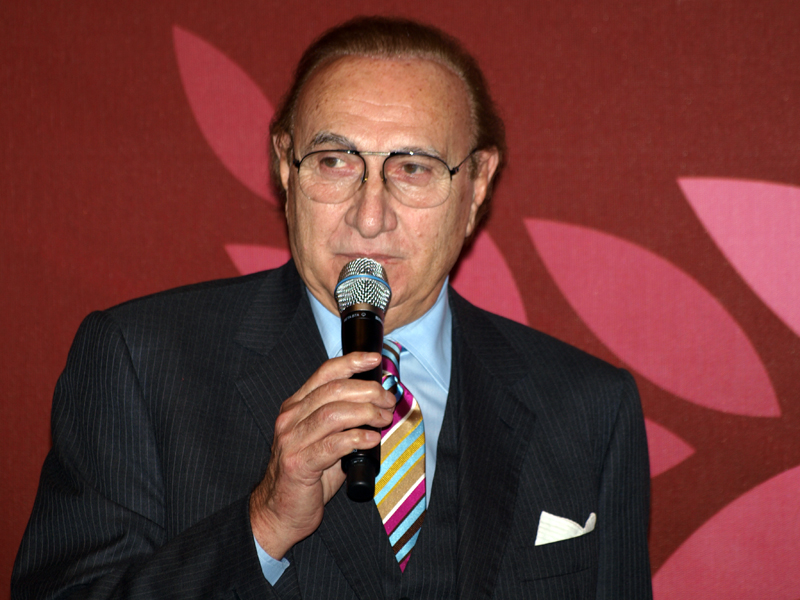
Pippo Baudo, presenter and artistic director of the show.

In June 2007, RAI vice director Giancarlo Leone officially announced Pippo Baudo and Piero Chiambretti as the presenters of the Sanremo Music Festival, also confirming Baudo as the artistic director of the show. It was Baudo's thirteenth Sanremo Music Festival as the presenter of the competition. Italian actress Bianca Guaccero and Hungarian fashion model and actress Andrea Osvárt were later selected as the co-presenters of the show.

Gaetano Castelli was the set designer for the fifteenth time, while theatre director Gino Landi, assisted by Massimo Fusi, was chosen as the director and choreographer of the show for the sixth time. The Sanremo Festival Orchestra was directed by Pippo Caruso.

== Shows ==
=== First night ===
During the first night of the competition, held on 25 February 2008, ten out of twenty acts competing in the Big Artists section performed their songs. They were voted by a jury composed of 1,000 people, 20 in each different region of Italy. The awarded points were not revealed, but they contributed to determine the final result of the competition. Additionally, 5 acts composing the Newcomers' section sang their entries and were voted by the same jury. The detailed ranking was not revealed, but the three acts receiving the fewest votes were eliminated from the competition.

==== Performances ====
Key:

– Contestant competing in the "Big Artists" section.
– Contestant competing in the "Newcomer Artists" section.

Performances of the contestants on the first night
R/O	Artist(s)	Song	Songwriter(s)	Result
1	Paolo Meneguzzi	"Grande"	Paolo Meneguzzi; Danilo Melotti; Gatto Panceri	—N/a
2	L'Aura	"Basta!"	Laura Abela	—N/a
3	Milagro	"Domani"	Antonio Capolupo	Advanced
4	Toto Cutugno	"Un falco chiuso in gabbia"	Davide De Marinis; Toto Cutugno	—N/a
5	Frankie Hi-NRG MC	"Rivoluzione"	Francesco Di Gesù; Francesco Bruni; Carolina Galbignani	—N/a
6	Andrea Bonomo	"Anna"	Andrea Bonomo; Luca Chiaravalli	Eliminated
7	Fabrizio Moro	"Eppure mi hai cambiato la vita"	Fabrizio Moro	—N/a
8	Frank Head	"Para parà ra rara"	Francesco Testa; Domenico Cardella	Advanced
9	Anna Tatangelo	"Il mio amico"	Gigi D'Alessio	—N/a
10	Michele Zarrillo	"L'ultimo film insieme"	Michele Zarrillo; Giampiero Artegiani	—N/a
11	Melody Fall	"Ascoltami"	Fabrizio Panebarco	Eliminated
12	Eugenio Bennato	"Grande sud"	Eugenio Bennato	—N/a
13	Daniele Battaglia	"Voce nel vento"	Daniele Battaglia; Simona Ruffino; Goffredo Orlandi	Eliminated
14	Max Gazzè	"Il solito sesso"	Francesco Gazzè; Max Gazzè	—N/a
15	Valerio Sanzotta	"Novecento"	Valerio Sanzotta	Advanced
16	Giua	"Tanto non vengo"	Maria Pierantoni Giua; Gianluca Martinelli	Advanced
17	Tricarico	"Vita tranquilla"	Francesco Tricarico	—N/a

==== Guests and other performances ====
- The first performance of the night was Gianni Morandi's cover version of Domenico Modugno's "Nel blu dipinto di blu", better known as "Volare", which won the Sanremo Music Festival in 1958.
- At the beginning of the night, the cast of the Italian version of the musical theatre stage work High School Musical performed the song "Insieme", Italian adaptation of "Together".
- Italian comedians Carlo Verdone and Geppi Cucciari appeared during the night, playing the roles of the characters of the film Grande, grosso e Verdone.
- American singer Lenny Kravitz performed his single "I'll Be Waiting". At the end of his performance, he also joked with Chiambretti, asking Baudo to play the song "Donna Rosa", written by Baudo himself.

=== Second night ===
The second night of the competition was held on 26 February 2008, with the same rules of the preceding one. The ten "Big Artists" which didn't perform on the first night, sang their entries for the first time and were voted by a brand new jury, composed of 1,000 people, 20 in each different region of Italy. As for the first night, the awarded points were not revealed, but they contributed to determine the final result of the competition. The last five acts composing the Newcomers' section also performed their songs, being voted by the same jury. Although the complete ranking was not revealed, the three acts receiving the fewer votes were eliminated from the competition.

==== Performances ====
Key:

– Contestant competing in the "Big Artists" section.
– Contestant competing in the "Newcomer Artists" section.

Performances of the contestants on the second night
R/O	Artist(s)	Song	Songwriter(s)	Result
1	Mario Venuti	"A ferro e fuoco"	Mario Venuti; Kaballà	—N/a
2	Amedeo Minghi	"Cammina cammina"	Amedeo Minghi; Giuseppe Marcucci	—N/a
3	La Scelta	"Il nostro tempo"	Roberto Cardelli; Fabrizio Ferraguzzo; Mattia Del Forno; Francesco Caprara; Emiliano Mangia	Advanced
4	Giò Di Tonno & Lola Ponce	"Colpo di fulmine"	Gianna Nannini	—N/a
5	Sonohra	"L'amore"	Luca Fainello; Roberto Tini; Diego Fainello	Advanced
6	Gianluca Grignani	"Cammina nel sole"	Gianluca Grignani	—N/a
7	Jacopo Troiani	"Ho bisogno di sentirmi dire ti voglio bene"	Stefano Cenci	Advanced
8	Mietta	"Baciami adesso"	Daniele Ronda; Pasquale Panella	—N/a
9	Rosario Morisco	"Signorsì"	Antonio De Carmine; Rosario Morisco; Antonio Spenillo; Mauro Spenillo	Eliminated
10	Little Tony	"Non finisce qui"	Danilo Amerio; Little Tony	—N/a
11	Ariel	"Ribelle"	Alex Gaydou; Luca Chiaravalli	Advanced
12	Tiromancino	"Il rubacuori"	Federico Zampaglione	—N/a
13	Finley	"Ricordi"	Daniele Persoglio; Carmine Ruggiero; Marco Pedretti; Danilo Calvio; Stefano Mantegazza	—N/a
14	Francesco Rapetti	"Come un'amante"	Mogol; Francesco Rapetti	Eliminated
15	Sergio Cammariere	"L'amore non si spiega"	Sergio Cammariere; Roberto Kunstler	—N/a
16	Valeria Vaglio	"Ore ed ore"	Valeria Vaglio	Eliminated
17	Loredana Bertè^{[A]}	"Musica e parole"	Alberto Radius; Oscar Avogadro; Loredana Bertè	—N/a

Notes

- A Loredana Bertè was disqualified from the competition after her performance, because it was revealed that "Musica e parole" was actually a cover of Ornella Ventura's "L'ultimo segreto", released in 1988, while the rules of the competition state that competing song cannot be released or publicly performed before the beginning of the Festival. Bertè changed only some lyrics of the song, claiming she thought it was never released before. Despite her elimination, Bertè was allowed to perform again during the Sanremo Music Festival.

==== Guests and other performances ====
- English new wave band Duran Duran performed the song "Falling Down" during the night.
- The Seleçao Sacerdoti, a non-profit football team composed of Catholic priests, appeared during the TV program, also performing a Latin-language version of Queen's "We Are the Champions".

=== Third night ===
During the third night, held on 28 February 2008, each contestant of the Big Artists section performed the competing song with a guest. No artist from the Newcomers' section performed during the night. Each performance was voted by a jury of 1,000 people, as in the previous two nights. Public votes were also introduced during the third night. No details about the rankings were revealed and no one of the competing acts was eliminated, but the collected votes contributed to determine the winner of the competition, during the final night held on 1 May 2008.

==== Performances ====
Performances of the contestants on the third night
R/O	Artist(s)	Song	Guest(s)
1	Finley	"Ricordi"	Belinda
2	Tricarico	"Vita tranquilla"	Mago Forest
3	Mietta	"Baciami adesso"	Neri per Caso
4	Fabrizio Moro	"Eppure mi hai cambiato la vita"	Gaetano Curreri
5	Sergio Cammariere	"L'amore non si spiega"	Gal Costa
6	Max Gazzè	"Il solito sesso"	Marina Rei, Paola Turci
7	Frankie Hi NRG MC	"Rivoluzione"	Simone Cristicchi
8	Eugenio Bennato	"Grande sud"	Pietra Montecorvino
9	Mario Venuti	"A ferro e fuoco"	Denovo
10	Giò Di Tonno & Lola Ponce	"Colpo di fulmine"	Los Vivancos
11	Gianluca Grignani	"Cammina nel sole"	Nomadi
12	Anna Tatangelo	"Il mio amico"	Michael Bolton
13	Paolo Meneguzzi	"Grande"	Tony Hadley
14	Little Tony	"Non finisce qui"	Gipsy Kings Family
15	Amedeo Minghi	"Cammina cammina"	Giuliana De Donno, Paola Berardi
16	L'Aura	"Basta!"	Rezophonic
17	Michele Zarrillo	"L'ultimo film insieme"	Paola e Chiara
18	Tiromancino	"Il rubacuori"	Stefano di Battista
19	Toto Cutugno	"Un falco chiuso in gabbia"	Annalisa Minetti

==== Guests and other performances ====
- Loredana Bertè, after being disqualified from the competition, was allowed to perform her song "Musica e parole" in a duet with Ivana Spagna, as previously planned. Their performance open the show.
- Franco-Israeli singer-songwriter Yael Naim performed her single "New Soul".
- American pianist and child prodigy of Chinese origins, Marc Yu, played "Flight of the Bumblebee" from Nikolai Rimsky-Korsakov's opera The Tale of Tsar Saltan. He also played some verses from Pippo Baudo's song "Donna Rosa".

=== Fourth night ===
During the fourth night, the eight remaining artists competing in the Newcomers' section performed their entries. Each act was voted by a "Quality jury", composed of celebrities, and by televotes. The "Quality jury" was composed of actors Nicolas Vaporidis and Sarah Felberbaum, music producer and talent scout Claudio Cecchetto, swimmer Alessia Filippi and writer Federico Moccia. At the end of the night, the duo Sonohra was announced the winner of the competition. The artists competing in the "Big Artists" section didn't appear during the night. Several other established Italian artists were invited to perform as guests, including Jovanotti, Giorgia and Fiorella Mannoia.

==== Performances ====
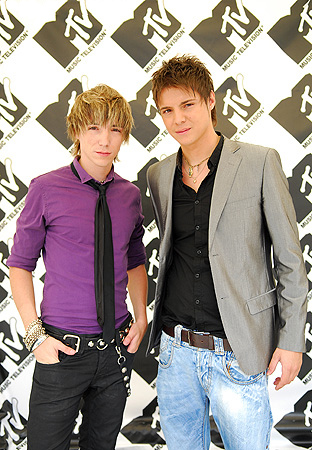
The duo Sonohra won the competition in the Newcomers' section.

Performances of the contestants on the fourth night
R/O	Artist(s)	Song	Result
1	Sonohra	"L'amore"	Winner
2	Ariel	"Ribelle"	Bottom five
3	Jacopo Troiani	"Ho bisogno di sentirmi dire ti voglio bene"	Third place
4	La Scelta	"Il nostro tempo"	Second place
5	Frank Head	"Para parà ra ra ra"	Bottom five
6	Valerio Sanzotta	"Novecento"	Bottom five
7	Giua	"Tanto non vengo"	Bottom five
8	Milagro	"Domani"	Bottom five

==== Guests and other performances ====
- Italian singer Giorgia was the first guest artist of the night. She performed George Gershwin's "The Man I Love", Luigi Tenco's "Se stasera sono qui" and her single "La La Song".
- Rapper and singer Jovanotti performed his single "Fango". American singer-songwriter and musician Ben Harper played guitar during his performance. Harper also performed "Lifeline", with Jovanotti appearing as a backing vocalist. Finally, Jovanotti sang his hit single "A te".
- Fiorella Mannoia sang cover versions of Sergio Endrigo's "Io che amo solo te" and Vasco Rossi's "Sally", as well as her 1987 hit single "Quello che le donne non dicono".
- British singer Leona Lewis performed the single "Bleeding Love".
- Gianni Morandi performed his songs "Stringimi le mani" and "Uno su mille", as well as José Feliciano and Ricchi e Poveri's "Che sarà".
- Italian band Pooh performed a medley of their past hits "Amici per sempre", "Pensiero", "Tanta voglia di lei", "Chi fermerà la musica", "Dimmi di sì" and "Uomini soli". Pooh also performed the single "La casa del sole".
- Italian pianist Nicola Piovani played the songs "Il pianino delle meraviglie", "La vita è bella" and "Quanto t'ho amato".
- At the end of the night, Loredana Bertè and Ivana Spagna performed once again the song "Musica e parole", ejected from the competition after the first performance. Pippo Baudo also gave to Loredana Bertè the prize which was assigned in 1982 to her sister, Mia Martini, for the song "E non finisce mica il cielo". It was the very first Critics' Award, but Mia Martini, who died in 1995, never received it.

=== Fifth night ===
During the fifth night, each song competing in the "Big Artists" section was performed again. Each performance was voted by a "Quality jury", composed of dancer Eleonora Abbagnato, TV author Gianni Boncompagni, TV presenters Giancarlo Magalli, Fabrizio Frizzi and Martina Colombari, journalists Emilio Fede and Tiziana Ferrario, actress Gloria Guida, writer and columnist Giampiero Mughini, and journalist Mariolina Simone. Public votes were also collected, and a final ranking was compiled, also combining the votes collected during the first and the second night. At the end of the night, Giò Di Tonno and Lola Ponce with the song "Colpo di fulmine" were announced the winners of the competition.

==== Performances ====
Performances of the contestants on the fifth night
R/O	Artist(s)	Song	Result
1	Paolo Meneguzzi	"Grande"	6th place
2	Gianluca Grignani	"Cammina nel sole"	8th place
3	Little Tony	"Non finisce qui"	9th place
4	Toto Cutugno	"Un falco chiuso in gabbia"	4th place
5	L'Aura	"Basta!"	Bottom nine
6	Anna Tatangelo	"Il mio amico"	2nd place
7	Amedeo Minghi	"Cammina cammina"	Bottom nine
8	Mario Venuti	"A ferro e fuoco"	Bottom nine
9	Giò Di Tonno & Lola Ponce	"Colpo di fulmine"	Winner
10	Michele Zarrillo	"L'ultimo film insieme"	Bottom nine
11	Fabrizio Moro	"Eppure mi hai cambiato la vita"	3rd place
12	Tiromancino	"Il rubacuori"	Bottom nine
13	Frankie Hi NRG MC	"Rivoluzione"	Bottom nine
14	Finley	"Ricordi"	5th place
15	Mietta	"Baciami adesso"	Bottom nine
16	Max Gazzè	"Il solito sesso"	Bottom nine
17	Sergio Cammariere	"L'amore non si spiega"	7th place
18	Eugenio Bennato	"Grande sud"	10th place
19	Tricarico	"Vita tranquilla"	Bottom nine

==== Guests and other performances ====
- Italian band Elio e le Storie Tese performed "Piano pianissimo", from Gioacchino Rossini's opera buffa The Barber of Seville.
- TV presenters Raimondo Vianello and Sandra Mondaini appeared during the night, receiving a prize awarded by the Italian Society of Authors and Publishers for their creativity.

== Other awards ==
=== Critics Award "Mia Martini" ===
==== Big Artists section ====
The Critics' Award, entitled to Italians singer Mia Martini, was awarded by journalists following the contest, and was given to Tricarico for his entry "Vita tranquilla". Loredana Bertè's "Musica e parole", after being disqualified from the main competition, was declared ineligible for the Critics Award too.

Points received by the "Big Artists" for the Critics Award
Artist	Song	Points	Result
Tricarico	"Vita tranquilla"	30	Winner
Sergio Cammariere	"L'amore non si spiega"	28	Second place
Frankie Hi-NRG MC	"Rivoluzione"	11	Third place
Max Gazzè	"Il solito sesso"	10	Fourth place
Giò Di Tonno & Lola Ponce	"Colpo di fulmine"	5	Fifth place
Eugenio Bennato	"Grande sud"	4	Sixth place
Anna Tatangelo	"Il mio amico"	4	Sixth place
Tiromancino	"Il rubacuori"	4	Sixth place
Mario Venuti	"A ferro e fuoco"	4	Sixth place
Toto Cutugno	"Un falco chiuso in gabbia"	3	Tenth place
Paolo Meneguzzi	"Grande"	3	Tenth place
Finley	"Ricordi"	2	Twelfth place
L'Aura	"Basta"	2	Twelfth place
Gianluca Grignani	"Cammina nel sole"	1	Thirteenth place
Little Tony	"Non finisce qui"	1	Thirteenth place
Mietta	"Baciami adesso"	1	Thirteenth place
Fabrizio Moro	"Eppure mi hai cambiato la vita"	1	Thirteenth place
Amedeo Minghi	"Cammina cammina"	0	Eighteenth place
Michele Zarrillo	"L'ultimo film insieme"	0	Eighteenth place

==== Newcomers' section ====
Points received by the "Newcomer Artists" for the Critics Award
Artist	Song	Points	Result
Frank Head	"Para parà ra rara"	30	Winner
Valerio Sanzotta	"Novecento"	29	Second place
La scelta	"Il nostro tempo"	22	Third place
Giua	"Tanto non vengo"	19	Fourth place
Ariel	"Ribelle"	8	Fifth place
Valeria Vaglio	"Ore ed ore"	7	Sixth place
Sonohra	"L'amore"	4	Seventh place
Milagro	"Domani"	3	Eighth place
Jacopo Troiani	"Ho bisogno di sentirmi dire ti voglio bene"	1	Ninth place
Andrea Bonomo	"Anna"	0	Tenth place
Melody Fall	"Ascoltami"	0	Tenth place
Rosario Morisco	"Signorsì"	0	Tenth place
Francesco Rapetti	"Come un amante"	0	Tenth place
Daniele Battaglia	"Voce nel vento"	0	Tenth place

=== Press, Radio & TV Award ===
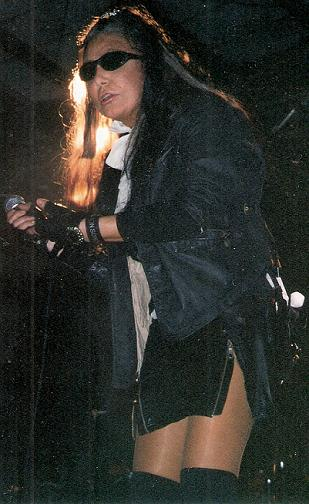
After being disqualified from the main competition, Loredana Bertè received the Press, Radio & TV Award in the Big Artists section.

==== Big Artists section ====
Points received by the "Big Artists" for the Press, Radio & TV Award
Artist	Song	Points	Result
Loredana Bertè	"Musica e parole"	13	Winner
Giò Di Tonno & Lola Ponce	"Colpo di fulmine"	11	Second place
Mietta	"Baciami adesso"	7	Third place
Frankie Hi NRG MC	"Rivoluzione"	6	Fourth place
Anna Tatangelo	"Il mio amico"	6	Fourth place
Max Gazzè	"Il solito sesso"	6	Fourth place
Eugenio Bennato	"Grande sud"	5	Seventh place
Tricarico	"Vita tranquilla"	5	Seventh place
Mario Venuti	"A ferro e fuoco"	5	Seventh place
L'Aura	"Basta!"	4	Tenth place
Sergio Cammariere	"L'amore non si spiega"	3	Eleventh place
Gianluca Grignani	"Cammina nel sole"	3	Eleventh place
Fabrizio Moro	"Eppure mi hai cambiato la vita"	3	Eleventh place
Toto Cutugno	"Un falco chiuso in gabbia"	2	Fourteenth place
Tiromancino	"Il rubacuori"	2	Fourteenth place
Little Tony	"Non finisce qui"	1	Sixteenth place
Amedeo Minghi	"Cammina cammina"	1	Sixteenth place
Michele Zarrillo	"L'ultimo film insieme"	0	Eighteenth place
Finley	"Ricordi"	0	Eighteenth place
Paolo Meneguzzi	"Grande"	0	Eighteenth place

==== Big Artists section ====
Points received by the "Newcomer Artists" for the Press, Radio & TV Award
Artist	Song	Points	Result
Ariel	"Ribelle"	18	Winner
La Scelta	"Il nostro tempo"	17	Second place
Frank Head	"Para parà ra rara"	14	Third place
Giua	"Tanto non vengo"	8	Fourth place
Sonohra	"L'amore"	7	Fifth place
Milagro	"Domani"	4	Sixth place
Valerio Sanzotta	"Novecento"	3	Seventh place
Jacopo Troiani	"Ho bisogno di sentirmi dire ti voglio bene"	3	Seventh place
Daniele Battaglia	"Voce nel vento"	2	Ninth place
Francesco Rapetti	"Come un'amante"	2	Ninth place
Valeria Vaglio	"Ore ed ore"	2	Ninth place
Melody Fall	"Ascoltami"	0	Twelfth place
Rosario Morisco	"Signorsì"	0	Twelfth place
Andrea Bonomo	"Anna"	0	Twelfth place

== Ratings ==
Episode	Date	Viewers	Share
Night 1	25 February 2008	7,068,000	36.46%
Night 2	26 February 2008	6,500,000	32.33%
Night 3	28 February 2008	6,152,000	33.20%
Night 4	29 February 2008	5,305,000	30.28%
Night 5	1 March 2008	8,124,000	44.90%
