= Giò Di Tonno =

Italian pop singer

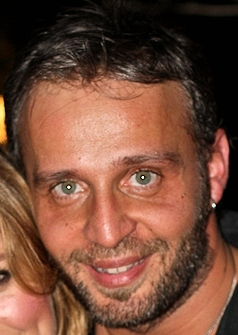
- Di Tonno in 2008

Background information
- Born: Giovanni Di Tonno; 5 August 1973 (age 53); Pescara, Italy
- Genres: Pop
- Occupations: Singer, theatre actor
- Years active: 1992–present
- Label: Raimoon Edizioni Musicali

Giovanni "Giò" Di Tonno (born 5 August 1973) is an Italian pop singer. In duo with Lola Ponce he won the 2008 edition of the Sanremo Music Festival, with the song "Colpo di fulmine" written by Gianna Nannini. In 2013, he won Tale e quale show on Rai 1, the Italian adaptation of Your Face Sounds Familiar.

== Discography ==
=== Albums ===
- 1994: Giò Di Tonno
- 2008: Santafè
- 2014: Giò

Preceded by Simone Cristicchi	Winner of the Sanremo Music Festival; 2008 with Lola Ponce	Succeeded by Marco Carta
