= Lola Ponce =

Argentine singer and actress

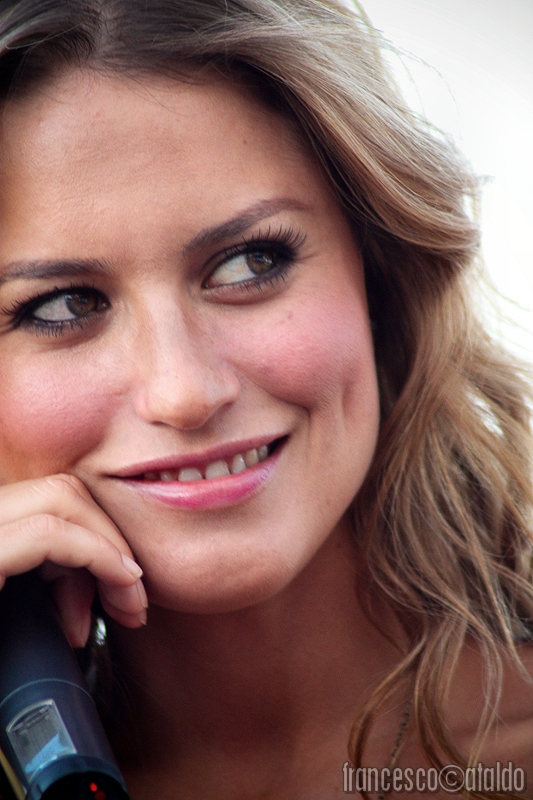
- Ponce in 2010

Background information
- Born: Paola Fabiana Ponce; 25 June 1982 (age 44); Santa Fe, Argentina
- Genres: Opera pop; pop rock; Latin pop
- Occupations: Singer; actress; producer
- Years active: 1996–present
- Label: independent
- Spouse: Aarón Díaz (m. 2015)

Paola Fabiana "Lola" Ponce (Latin American Spanish pronunciation: [ˈlola ˈponse]; born 25 June 1982) is an Argentine singer and actress.

Ponce made her breakthrough in Argentina and Latin America with her debut album Inalcanzable, which was released in 2001. She also earned a great popularity in Italy, after starring in musical Notre-Dame de Paris in Verona. Ponce has since released two more albums—Fearless (2004) and Il diario di Lola (2008)—and has performed in Spanish, Italian and English. In 2008, along with Giò Di Tonno, she won the Sanremo Festival with the song "Colpo di fulmine". She has performed in several concerts with Andrea Bocelli and Riccardo Cocciante.

== Life and career ==
=== Early life and career (1982–1997) ===
Lola Ponce was born in Santa Fe Province, to Hector and María. She has two siblings, Claudia and Alejandro. Born and raised in a musical family, she formed a duo with her brother when she was only eight, performing melodic songs. Ponce took part in many festivals in Latin America as child and teenager. In 1998, she had a role in Chiquititas, a popular TV series created by Cris Morena, and signed a recording contract with producer Oscar Mediavilla in 1999. Ponce entered the University of Buenos Aires, but dropped it to pursue her music career.

=== Stardom (2001–present) ===
Ponce released her debut album Inalcanzable in 2001, achieving a great success in Latin America. In 2002, she was cast as Esméralda in theatre musical Notre-Dame de Paris, which was shown in Verona, Italy, and Barcelona, Spain. Ponce recorded two songs for the musical soundtrack, "Ave Maria Pagana" and "Ali in Gabbia, Occhi Selvaggi", and made her breakthrough in Italy and Europe. In 2004, she released her first album in English, Fearless, and in 2005 performed her song "Sleep" in the revival part of the San Remo Festival.

In 2008, she released third studio albums Il diario di Lola, which contains songs in Spanish, Italian and English. Ponce also won the 58th Sanremo Music Festival along with Giò Di Tonno and the song "Colpo di fulmine". The song reached number one at Italian Singles Chart. In 2010, Ponce appeared in several television series and films, and starred the stage adaptation of Alessandro Manzoni's novel The Betrothed. She also participated in Argentine version of Dancing with the Stars, Bailando por un sueño, and released her first compilation album Lola.

== Personal life ==
Ponce dated Italian lawyer Manuel Malenotti for five years, from 2005 to 2010.

She began a relationship with her El Talismán co-star Aarón Díaz in 2012. They have two daughters: Erin (born February 2013) and Regina (born August 2014). The couple got married in June 2015, in a private ceremony held in Morocco.

== Discography ==
- 2001: Inalcanzable
- 2002: Notre-Dame de Paris
- 2004: Fearless
- 2008: Il diario di Lola
- 2010: Lola

== Filmography ==
Title	Year	Role	Notes
Tiny Angels	1998	Serena	(TV Series) Chiquititas
Notre-Dame de Paris	2002	Esméralda	(Stage) Produced by Verona Arena
Notre-Dame de Paris – Live from Verona Arena	2002	Esméralda	(TV Film) Notre Dame de Paris – Live Arena di Verona
Without Code	2004	Luna	(TV Miniseries) Sin código
Never Say Big Brother	2009	Herself / co-host	(Comedy Show) Mai Dire Grande Fratello Show
Powder	2009	Marcela	Polvere
Cinderella 2000	2010	Cenicienta	(TV Film) Cenicienta 2000
Love at First Sight	2010	Maya Rivera	(TV Film) Colpo di fulmine
Dancing with the Stars 2010	2010	Herself / Contestant	(TV Show) Bailando por un sueño 2010
The Two Faces of Love	2010	Jessica	(TV Series; 1 episode) Le due facce dell'amore
Love & Slaps	2010	Gladys	La bellezza del somaro
The Betrothed – A Modern Opera	2010	Nun of Monza	(Stage) I promessi sposi – Opera moderna
El Talismán	2012	Lucrecia Negrete	

Preceded by Simone Cristicchi	San Remo Festival winner (with Giò Di Tonno); 2008	Succeeded by Marco Carta
