= Sanremo Music Festival 1990 =

Italian song contest (40th edition)

Dates and venue
- Semi-final 1: 28 February 1990
- Semi-final 2: 1 March 1990
- Semi-final 3: 2 March 1990
- Final: 3 March 1990
- Venue: Teatro Palafiori; Sanremo, Italy

Organisation
- Broadcaster: Radiotelevisione italiana (RAI)
- Artistic director: Adriano Aragozzini
- Presenters: Johnny Dorelli and Gabriella Carlucci

Big Artists section
- Number of entries: 20
- Winner: "Uomini soli" Pooh

Newcomers' section
- Number of entries: 16
- Winner: "Disperato"; Marco Masini

The Sanremo Music Festival 1990 (Italian: Festival di Sanremo 1990), officially the 40th Italian Song Festival (40º Festival della canzone italiana), was the 40th annual Sanremo Music Festival, held at the Teatro Palafiori in Sanremo between 28 February and 3 March 1990 and broadcast by Radiotelevisione italiana (RAI). The show was presented by Johnny Dorelli and Gabriella Carlucci (the former having won the festival in 1958 and 1959). Adriano Aragozzini served as artistic director. The venue was a provisional structure built in the area of the Sanremo flower market, since the Teatro Ariston, serving as the venue for the event since 1977, was undergoing renovation works.

According to the rules of this edition, each song of the Big Artists section was presented in a double performance by a non-Italian singer or group, and adapted in their foreign language. The winner of the Big Artists section was the band Pooh with the song "Uomini soli", while Mia Martini won the critics award with the song "La nevicata del '56". Marco Masini won the Newcomers section with the song "Disperato".

== Participants and results ==
=== Big Artists ===
Big Artists section
Song	Artist(s)	Songwriter(s)	Foreign version	Foreign artist(s)	Rank
"Uomini soli"	Pooh	Valerio Negrini; Roby Facchinetti	"Angel of the Night"	Dee Dee Bridgewater	1
"Gli amori"	Toto Cutugno	Fabrizio Berlincioni; Toto Cutugno; Depsa	"Good Love Gone Bad"	Ray Charles	2
"Vattene amore"	Amedeo Minghi & Mietta	Amedeo Minghi; Pasquale Panella; Augusto Martelli	"All for the Love"	Nikka Costa	3
"Donna con te"	Anna Oxa	Danilo Amerio; Luciano Boero	"Donna con te"	Kaoma	Finalist
"Verso l'ignoto"	Marcella & Gianni Bella	Daniele Di Gregorio; Gianni Bella; Rosario Di Bella	"You and Me"	La Toya Jackson	Finalist
"La nevicata del '56"	Mia Martini	Carla Vistarini; Franco Califano; Massimo Cantini; Luigi Lopez	"La nevada"	Manuel Mijares	Finalist / Critics Award
"Ringrazio Dio"	Paola Turci	Alfredo Rizzo; Rambow; R. Silvestro	"Nas asas de um violão"	Toquinho	Finalist
"Sono felice"	Milva	Rosalino Cellamare	"Deep Joy"	Sandie Shaw	Finalist
"Io e mio padre"	Grazia Di Michele	Grazia Di Michele	"Me and My Father"	Nicolette Larson	Finalist
"Amori"	Lena Biolcati	Lena Biolcati; Robymiro	"Elle avait"	Gilbert Montagné	Finalist
"Bisognerebbe non pensare che a te"	Caterina Caselli	Guido Morra; Maurizio Fabrizio	"Give me a Reason"	Miriam Makeba	Finalist
"Tu... sì"	Mango	Armando Mango; Giuseppe Mango	"The Moth and the Flame"	Leo Sayer	Finalist
"Ma quale amore"	Riccardo Fogli	Andrea De Angelis; Laurex; Luigi Lopez	"Speak to Me of Love"	Sarah Jane Morris	Finalist
"Evviva Maria"	Peppino di Capri	Peppino di Capri; Depsa	"Nobody Does the Lambada Like My Mother and My Father"	Kid Creole & The Coconuts	Finalist
"Vorrei"	Mino Reitano	Cristiano Malgioglio; Patrizia Vernola; Franco Reitano; Mino Reitano	"Quisiera"	Valeria Lynch	Finalist
"Io vorrei"	Sandro Giacobbe	Toto Cutugno; Sandro Giacobbe	"Last Two to Dance"	America	Finalist
"Amore"	Christian	Fabrizio Berlincioni; Christian; Silvio Amato; Franco Morgia	"Amore"	Eddie Kendricks	Finalist
"A"	Francesco Salvi	Francesco Salvi; Mario Natale; Roberto Turatti; Silvio Melloni; Francesco Salvi	"A"	Papa Winnie	Finalist
"Buona giornata"	Ricchi e Poveri	Depsa; Mauro Paoluzzi; Vittorio Cosma	"Boa jornada"	Jorge Ben	Finalist
"Novecento aufwiedersehen"	Eugenio Bennato & Tony Esposito	Eugenio Bennato; Tony Esposito; Carlo D'Angiò	"Novecento aufwiedersehen"	Moncada	Finalist

=== Newcomers ===
Newcomers section
Song	Artist(s)	Songwriter(s)	Rank
"Disperato"	Marco Masini	Marco Masini; Giancarlo Bigazzi; Giuseppe Dati	1 / Critics Award
"Vieni a stare qui"	Franco Fasano	Fabrizio Berlincioni; Adelio Cogliati; Italo Ianne; Franco Fasano	2
"Secondo te"	Gianluca Guidi	Giorgio Calabrese; Augusto Martelli	3
"La lambada strofinera"	Armando De Razza	Renzo Arbore; Armando De Razza	Finalist
"L'età dell'oro"	Rosalinda Celentano	Maurizio Fabrizio; Antonella Maggio	Finalist
"Noi che non diciamo mai mai"	Dario Gai	Dario Gai	Finalist
"Sarai grande"	Silvia Mezzanotte	Alberto Alessi; L. Pirrone; Alberto Alessi	Finalist
"'Ti dirò"	Future	R. Bolognesi; Armando Gentile; Romano Bais; Davide Spurio	Finalist
"Una storia da raccontare"	Beppe De Francia & Bea Giannini	Eliop; Politanò	Finalist
"Un cielo che si muove"	Lijao	Adelio Cogliati; Livio Visentin; Piero Cassano	Finalist
"Che donne saremo"	Lipstick	Valerio Negrini; Mario Tansini	Eliminated
"Favolando"	Rosè Crisci	Enzo Gragnaniello	Eliminated
"Malinconia d’ottobre"	Élite	Oscar Avogadro; Gian Paolo Compagnoni; M. Bettalico	Eliminated
"Oh dolce amor!"	Proxima	Stefania Martinelli; Andrea Majocchi	Eliminated
"Per curiosità"	Maurizio Della Rosa	Maurizio Nazzaro; Marco Luberti	Eliminated
"Sbandamenti"	Sergio Laccone	Sergio Laccone	Eliminated

== Guests ==
Guests
Artist(s)	Song(s)
Liza Minnelli	"Love Pains" "Losing My Mind"
Rod Stewart	"Downtown Train"
Tina Turner	"The Best" "Steamy Windows"
Renato Pozzetto	"Ho visto un re"
Depeche Mode	"Enjoy the Silence"
The Mission	"Butterfly on a Wheel"

== Broadcasts ==
=== Local broadcast ===
All shows were broadcast on Italian Television beginning at 22:00 CET (21:00 UTC).

=== International broadcast ===
Known details on the broadcasts in each country, including the specific broadcasting stations and commentators are shown in the tables below.

International broadcasters of the Sanremo Music Festival 1990
Country	Broadcaster	Channel(s)	Commentator(s)	Ref(s)
Chile	UCVTV	UCV Televisión (Note: Delayed broadcast on 27 March at 21:30 (CLST))		
Chile	UCVTV	Canal 8 (Note: Delayed broadcast on 10 April at 21:45 (CLST))		
Germany	3sat (Note: Delayed broadcast on 12 May at 20:55 (CEST))			
