= L'uomo volante =

Single by Marco Masini

from the album Masini
- Released: 2004
- Genre: Pop rock
- Length: 3:56
- Label: Universal Music
- Songwriters: Marco Masini; Giuseppe Dati; Goffredo Orlandi

Marco Masini singles chronology
| "Io non ti sposerò" (2003) | "L'uomo volante" (2004) | "E ti amo" (2004) |

Music video
- "L'uomo volante" on YouTube

"L'uomo volante" (Italian pronunciation: [ˈlwɔːmo voˈlante]; transl. "The Flying Man") is a 2004 song by Italian singer-songwriter Marco Masini, written with Giuseppe Dati and Goffredo Orlandi. With this song, Masini won the Sanremo Music Festival 2004, receiving as well the Volare Award for Best Lyrics and the Radio and TV Press Award.

This was Masini's second win at the Sanremo Music Festival, after winning the newcomer section in 1990 with the song "Disperato". The song was released as a single, and after the festival it was included in the album Masini, a reprint of Marco's 2003 compilation album …il mio cammino.

== Song information ==
The song is about the wish to become father: it is narrated by a man, who ideally talks to his future son/daughter. As Masini himself has stated, the song is autobiographical. The video for the song was directed by Leonardo Torrini.

== Track listing ==
| No. | Title | Length |
|---|---|---|
| 1. | "L'uomo volante" | 3:56 |
| 2. | "L'uomo volante (Instrumental version with backing vocals)" | 3:55 |
| 3. | "L'uomo volante (International instrumental version)" | 3:55 |

== Chart ==
| Chart (2004) | Peak position |
|---|---|
| Italy (FIMI) | 8 |
