= Dammi solo un minuto =

Single by Pooh

from the album Rotolando respirando
- B-side: "Che ne fai di te"
- Released: 1977
- Genre: Pop rock
- Label: CBS
- Songwriter(s): Roby Facchinetti; Valerio Negrini

Pooh singles chronology
"Risveglio" (1977)	"Dammi solo un minuto" (1977)	"Cercami" (1978)

Audio
- "Dammi solo un minuto" on YouTube

"Dammi solo un minuto" ('Give me only one minute') is a 1977 song composed by Roby Facchinetti and Valerio Negrini and performed by the Italian musical group Pooh.

== Background ==
The song was initially part of a planned concept album which was eventually dismissed. It was later chosen as leading single of the album Rotolando respirando, and it premiered at the 1977 Festivalbar.

== Other versions ==
Pooh recorded the song in English as "Give Me Only This Moment" and in Spanish as "Dame sólo un minuto". Pooh's member Dodi Battaglia recorded a new version in a duet with Enrico Ruggeri in his 2018 solo album Dodi Day. The song was sampled in Gemelli DiVersi's 1998 hit "Un attimo ancora", featuring Jenny B. Artists who covered the song also include Venezuelan rock-progressive band Témpano.

== Track listing ==
No.	Title	Writer(s)	Length
1.	"Dammi solo un minuto"	Roby Facchinetti, Valerio Negrini	4:34
2.	"Che ne fai di te"	Roby Facchinetti, Stefano D'Orazio	3:29

== Charts ==
Chart	Peak position
Italy (Musica e dischi)	2
