= Nino Porzio =

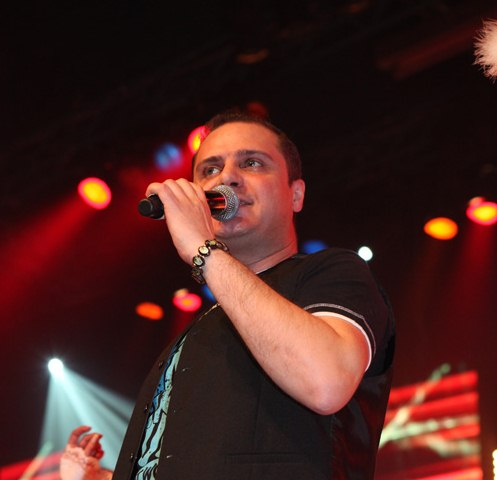
- Porzio at a concert in Cologne, Germany, 2012

Background information
- Born: Antonino Porzio; 4 June 1972 (age 54); Palermo, Italy
- Origin: Palermo
- Genres: Canzone Napoletana, Pop music
- Occupations: Singer and actor
- Years active: 1993–present
- Labels: Sony Music, Universal Music Group Seamusica, Mint Records, Warner Music Group, Akasa Records ZYX Music, MCP Sound & Media, Eurotrend, Radiomixitalia
- Website: ninoporzio.wordpress.com

Nino Porzio logo

Antonino "Nino" Porzio (born 4 June 1972), is an Italian singer and actor. He has released six albums and his songs have been included in various Italian and international compilations.

== Career ==
Born in Palermo in 1972, Porzio since childhood dedicated to singing and acting. In the late 1970s he moved with his younger brother and his family in Germany. In the 1980s, he began working in his father's grocery store in between studying singing and acting. From 1983 to 1989 he began studying drums formed his first band, playing drums in various street festivals.

He began his career as a soloist in Germany in the 1990s, performing in other parts of Europe. In 1995 he recorded his first album, titled Rosa; the artist was presented to the CNS freelance service cnspress.org, and evaluated as "not bad" (Wird noch). In 1998 Porzio composed the song "Sogno", which was selected and included in a compilation of HDN Music label.

On 20 July 2000 he recorded his second album, Mille pazzie, distributed in by Musicanapoletana.com.

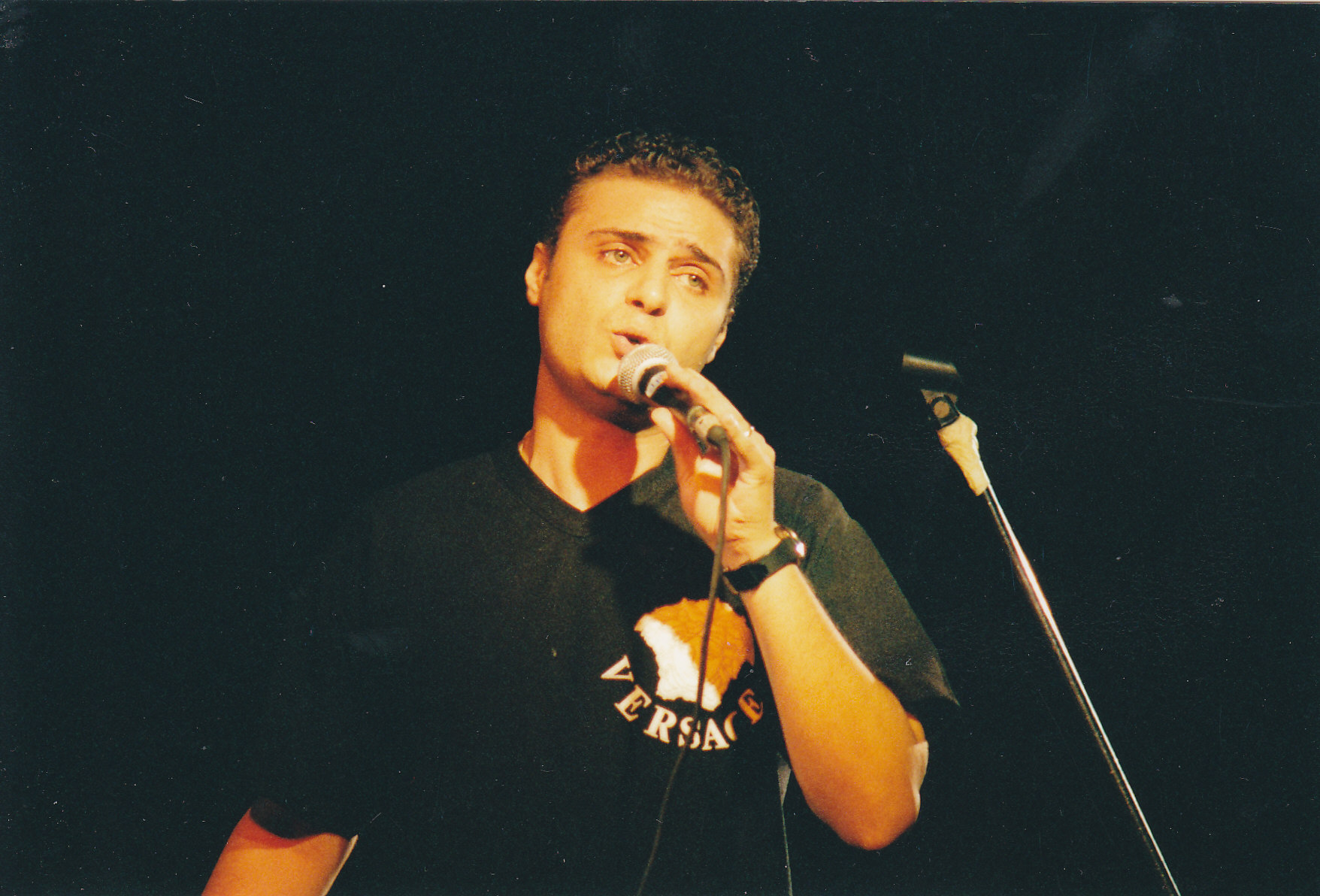
Porzio at the Girofestival (2001).

In 2001, he participated in the singing competition “Voci Nuove Per La Discografia” in Rome organised by CBS Italia.

2009 he released his new single titled Ti Amo. April 21, 2011 he released his new album titled Caruso, after a song by Lucio Dalla, produced by Mint Records In 2011 Made in Italy was released: it contains 8 covers, including "Nel blu dipinto di blu" ("Volare") by Domenico Modugno, "Ancora tu" by Lucio Battisti, and "Quando, quando, quando" by Tony Renis.

On 19 August 2013, the song "Ti amo" was placed in a box set of four CDs of Italian songs distributed by Mondadori. Also in December 2013 a new single, "Io penso a te", was released: was listed in the 38th place in the german charting service Mallorca Megacharts.

In June 2014 he released his new single "Attimi", which anticipated the fifth album Brividi nel cuore, released September 17, 2014, recorded live and produced and distributed by Seamusica.

On 28 February 2015 he was mentioned in the novel on the life of Lucio Dalla, Caruso The Song Lucio Dalla and Sorrento, by Raffaele Lauro.

From 1 February 2016 until the end of June 2018, Porzio will be in the Schauspielhaus Theater in Düsseldorf

On December 11, 2017 he was seen for 6 seconds at prank show Luke! Die Woche und ich. together with Luke Mockridge.

On April 11, 2019, Ross Antony official music video "Fiesta Mexicana" can be seen on Youtube, he appears as one of the dancers.

On April 25, 2019 he can be seen in advertising the American Bull's-Eye Barbecue Sauce

On June 16, 2020 the new official music video Tanta voglia di lei will be released on Vevo.

== Discography ==
=== Albums ===
Studio albums

- 1995: Rosa
- 2000: Mille Pazzie
- 2011: Caruso (ZYX Music- Mint Records / BMG Ricordi Music Publishing / EMI Italiana
- 2011: Made in Italy
- 2014: Brividi nel cuore
- 2016: Greatest Hits

=== EP ===
- 2009: Ti amo(Akasa Records- Warner Music Group)

=== Single ===
- 1998: "Sogno"
- 2013: "Io penso a te"
- 2014: "Attimi"
- 2016: "Lontani Nel Tempo"
- 2017: "lontani nel tempo"

=== Cover ===
- 2020: "Tanta voglia di lei" (Roby Facchinetti) (Vevo, Universal Music Group, Sony Music)
- 2011: "Caruso" (Lucio Dalla)
- 2011: "L'Italiano" (Toto Cutugno)
- 2011: "Ancora tu" (Lucio Battisti)
- 2011: "Quando Quando Quando" (Tony Renis)
- 2011: "Nel blu dipinto di blu" (Domenico Modugno)
- 2011: "Più bella cosa" (Eros Ramazzotti)
- 2011: "Malafemmena" (Antonio De Curtis)
- 2011: "Sempre sempre" (Albano Carrisi)
- 2011: "Anema e core" (Salve D'Esposito / Tito Manlio)

== Filmography ==
- Tatort (TV series) (2020)
- Il Traditore (2019 film)
- Keiner schiebt uns weg (2018 TV Movie)
- HERRliche Zeiten (2018 film)
- Volt (2016 film)
- Gomorrah (TV series) (2016)
- Fritz Lang (TV series) (2016)
- Der Chef ist tot (TV series) / The Boss Is Dead (2016)
- The Dark Side of the Moon / Die dunkle Seite des Mondes (2015)
- Alarm für Cobra 11 (2015) as Peter Koslowski (Alarm for Cobra 11 – The Highway Police)
- Alarm für Cobra 11 (2013/2014) (Alarm for Cobra 11 – The Highway Police)
- Danni Lowinski (2014)
- Sternstunde ihres Lebens (2014)
- Marie Brand (2014)
- Der letzte Bulle (2014) (The last cop)
- Rush (2013), as Ferrari Mechanic
