= Gli amori =

Single by Toto Cutugno

from the album Toto Cutugno
- B-side: "Strana gelosia"
- Released: 28 February 1990
- Genre: Ballad
- Length: 4:00
- Label: EMI
- Songwriters: Fabrizio Berlincioni, Toto Cutugno, Depsa

Toto Cutugno singles chronology
"Le mamme" (1989)	"Gli amori" (1990)	"Insieme: 1992" (1990)

Audio
- "Gli amori" on YouTube

"Gli amori" ("Loves") is a 1990 song composed by Fabrizio Berlincioni, Toto Cutugno and Depsa and performed by Toto Cutugno. The song entered the competition the 40th edition of the Sanremo Music Festival, where it was also performed by Ray Charles in a critically acclaimed English-language adaptation titled "Good Love Gone Bad". The song eventually was the runner-up of the festival behind Pooh's "Uomini soli", and also ranked second in the critics' award behind Mia Martini's "La nevicata del '56". In 2004, the song was included in the soundtrack of the film Don't Move.

== Track listing ==
- 7" single
1. "Gli amori" (Fabrizio Berlincioni, Toto Cutugno, Depsa)
2. "Strana gelosia" (Toto Cutugno)

== Charts ==
Chart (1990)	Peak position
Italy (Musica e dischi)	9
Italy Airplay (Music & Media)	2
