= Tanta voglia di lei =

Single by Pooh

from the album Opera prima
- B-side: "Tutto alle tre"
- Released: 28 April 1971
- Genre: Pop rock
- Label: CBS
- Songwriters: Roby Facchinetti; Valerio Negrini

Pooh singles chronology
"Goodbye Madama Butterfly" (1971)	"Tanta voglia di lei" (1971)	"Pensiero" (1971)

Audio
- "Tanta voglia di lei" on YouTube

"Tanta voglia di lei" ('So much longing for her') is a 1971 song composed by Roby Facchinetti and Valerio Negrini and performed by the Italian musical group Pooh.

== Background ==
The song had a troubled production, with various lyrics being tested and dismissed, including a version titled "La mia croce è lei" ('My cross is her') with lyrics by Daniele Pace. Also, CBS initially preferred the B-side "Tutto alle tre" as A-side.

== Release ==
The single was released on 28 April 1971. It was the first Pooh song to top the Italian hit parade, and sold over 1 million and 200,000 copies, being certified gold disc. It entered the competition at the 1971 Cantagiro, and later took part in Festivalbar, where it ranked second behind Demis Roussos' "We Shall Dance".

== Other versions ==
Pooh recorded the song in English as "I'll Close the Door Behind Me" and in Spanish in various versions, notably "Tantos deseos de ti", "Tantos deseos de ella", "Debes comprenderme" and "El verdarero amor". Pooh's members Roby Facchinetti and Riccardo Fogli released solo versions of the song, while Dodi Battaglia recorded a new version in a duet with Gigi D'Alessio in his 2018 solo album Dodi Day. Artists who covered the song also include Pimpinela, José Luis Rodríguez, Bobby Valentín, Mar de Copas, Danny Rivera, Víctor Manuelle.

== Track listing ==
No.	Title	Writer(s)	Length
1.	"Tanta voglia di lei"	Roby Facchinetti, Valerio Negrini	4:15
2.	"Tutto alle tre"	Roby Facchinetti, Valerio Negrini	3:52

== Charts ==
Chart (1971–72)	Peak position
Argentina (CAPIF)	1
Italy (Musica e dischi)	1

== Personnel ==
- Dodi Battaglia - lead vocals, guitar
- Valerio Negrini - drums, backing vocals
- Roby Facchinetti - keyboards, backing vocals
- Riccardo Fogli - bass guitar, backing vocals
