= Tropico del nord =

Studio album by Pooh
- Released: 16 September 1983
- Recorded: May – June 1983
- Studio: Air Studios, Montserrat
- Genre: Pop
- Length: 44:47
- Label: CGD
- Producer: Pooh

Pooh chronology
Palasport (1982)	Tropico del nord (1983)	Aloha (1984)

Tropico del nord is the ninth album released by the Italian rock band Pooh in 1983. According to the liner notes, it was the first album ever released on CD by an Italian band.

The album was recorded in Montserrat.

== Reception ==
In a review on Corriere della Sera, Mario Luzzatto Fegiz remarked that despite the recording happening on a tropical island, the sound is not very different from the previous Pooh albums, however adding that "it is precisely the skillful provincial taste of these lyrics that manage to describe the everyday ephemerality, [and] those choruses that constitute the most valuable part of Pooh's overall banal sounds, that give this album good market possibilities."

== Track listing ==
No.	Title	Lyrics	Music	Length
1.	"Cara sconosciuta"	Valerio Negrini	Roby Facchinetti	4:40
2.	"Cosa dici di me"	Stefano D'Orazio	Facchinetti; Red Canzian	4:56
3.	"Lettera da Berlino Est"	Negrini	Facchinetti	4:40
4.	"Grandi speranze"	Negrini	Facchinetti	6:40
5.	"Passaporto per le stelle"	Negrini	Facchinetti	4:44
6.	"Solo voci"	Negrini	Facchinetti	1:22
7.	"Mezzanotte per te"	Negrini	Dodi Battaglia	4:50
8.	"È vero"	Negrini	Facchinetti	4:21
9.	"Colazione a New York"	Negrini	Red Canzian	4:23
10.	"Tropico del nord"	D'Orazio	Facchinetti	4:01
Total length:				44:47

== Charts ==
Chart (1995)	Peak position
Italy (Musica e dischi)	2

== Personnel ==
Pooh

1. Roby Facchinetti – vocals, piano, Fairlight CMI
2. Dodi Battaglia – guitars, vocals
3. Red Canzian – bass guitar, vocals
4. Stefano D'Orazio – drums, percussion, vocals

Production

1. Luciano Tallarini – art direction
2. Maurizio Biancani – engineering, mixing
3. Marco Inzadi – mastering
4. Jeremy Allom, Steve Culnane, Osiride Gozzi – studio assistants

Design

1. Alessandro Gerini – graphics
2. Roberto Tomasin – photography
