= Chi fermerà la musica =

Single by Pooh

from the album Buona fortuna
- B-side: "Banda nel vento"
- Released: 1981
- Genre: Pop rock
- Label: CBS
- Songwriter(s): Roby Facchinetti; Valerio Negrini

Pooh singles chronology
"Canterò per te" (1980)	"Chi fermerà la musica" (1981)	"Buona fortuna" (1981)

Music video
- "Chi fermerà la musica" on YouTube

"Chi fermerà la musica" ('Who will stop the music') is a 1981 song composed by Roby Facchinetti and Valerio Negrini and performed by the Italian musical group Pooh.

The leading single of the album Buona fortuna, it was released on 21 April 1981, and became one of the major hits of the summer season, as well as one of the signature songs of the band. Described as "a hymn to independent and unconstrained music", it was performed out of competition at the 1981 Festivalbar. A music video was shot between Milan, Rimini and Monte Titano. A new version of the song, with the inclusion of Riccardo Fogli and rockier arrangements, was released in 2016.

The cover might be a reference to Huey Lewis and the News first album published one year before this single.

== Track listing ==
No.	Title	Writer(s)	Length
1.	"Chi fermerà la musica"	Roby Facchinetti, Valerio Negrini	4:34
2.	"Banda nel vento"	Roby Facchinetti, Stefano D'Orazio	3:29

== Charts ==
Chart	Peak position
Italy (Musica e dischi)	1
