= Luigi Lopez =

Italian musician (1947–2025)

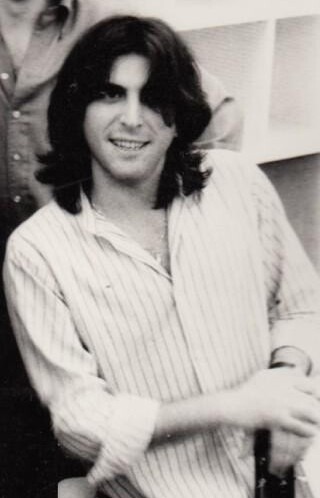
Lopez in 1977

Luigi Lopez (30 September 1947 – 6 May 2025) was an Italian composer, musician and singer-songwriter.

== Life and career ==
Lopez started his career as songwriter in the late 1960s, and in 1970 he started a long professional association with lyricist Carla Vistarini, co-writing the Showmen's single "Mi sei entrata nel cuore". In the second half of the 1970s, he was a member of the short-lived supergroup Fantasy, with Vastarini, Tony Cicco and Viola Valentino, among others. Starting from "La voglia di sognare", the title track of Ornella Vanoni's 1974 album of the same name, Lopez composed numerous hits, including "Mondo", with which Riccardo Fogli won the Festivalbar Discoverde competition in 1976, "La notte dei pensieri", with which Michele Zarrillo won the Newcomers competition at the Sanremo Music Festival 1987, and "La nevicata del '56", which at the Sanremo Music Festival 1990 earned Mia Martini her third Critics' Award. In 1982, his composition "Where Did We Go Wrong" won the World Popular Song Festival.

During his career Lopez's collaborations include Mina, Patty Pravo, Alice, Franco Califano, Fiorella Mannoia, Sylvie Vartan, Peppino di Capri, and Franco Migliacci, with whom he co-wrote "Delfini (Sai che c'è)", a 1993 song that marked the recording return of Domenico Modugno. As a singer, he is better-known for "Pinocchio perchè no?", the Italian theme song of the anime Pinocchio: The Series.

Lopez died at his home in Civita Castellana, on 6 May 2025, at the age of 77.
