= Sanremo Music Festival 2004 =

Italian song contest (54th edition)

Dates and venue
- Semi-final 1: 2 March 2004
- Semi-final 2: 3 March 2004
- Semi-final 3: 4 March 2004
- Semi-final 4: 5 March 2004
- Final: 6 March 2004
- Venue: Teatro Ariston; Sanremo, Italy

Production
- Broadcaster: Radiotelevisione italiana (RAI)
- Director: Stefano Vicario
- Musical director: Leonardo De Amicis
- Artistic director: Tony Renis
- Presenters: Simona Ventura and Paola Cortellesi, Gene Gnocchi, Maurizio Crozza

Overall competition
- Number of entries: 22
- Winner: "L'uomo volante" Marco Masini

The Sanremo Music Festival 2004 (Italian: Festival di Sanremo 2004), officially the 54th Italian Song Festival (54º Festival della canzone italiana), was the 54th annual Sanremo Music Festival, held at the Teatro Ariston in Sanremo between 2 and 6 March 2004 and broadcast by Radiotelevisione italiana (RAI). The show was presented by Simona Ventura, supported by Paola Cortellesi, Gene Gnocchi and Maurizio Crozza. Composer Tony Renis (who had won the festival in 1963) served as the artistic director.

For the first time since 1984, this edition did not feature a division of the singers in two sections (Big Artists and Newcomers), but a single competition, which was won by Marco Masini with the song "L'uomo volante". Mario Venuti won the Critics Award with the song "Crudele". As was the case in 1975, due to disagreements between artistic director Tony Renis and major record companies, these boycotted the festival and did not enter their artists in the competition.

In addition to musical guests, the guests of this edition also included Dustin Hoffman, Cirque du Soleil, Stefania Sandrelli, Rupert Everett, Raoul Bova, Roberto Bolle.

After every night, Bruno Vespa and Alba Parietti hosted a special edition of the talk show Porta a Porta with the participation of singers and journalists.

== Participants and results ==
Big Artists section
Song	Artist(s)	Songwriter(s)	Rank	Notes
"L'uomo volante"	Marco Masini	Marco Masini; Giuseppe Dati; Goffredo Orlandi	1	Winner of the "Big Artists" section; Volare Award for Best Lyrics
"Sei la vita mia"	Mario Rosini	Lino Patruno; L. Rana; G. Giorgilli; L. Leone; C. Noto	2	Volare Award for Best Arrangement
"Aria, sole, terra e mare"	Linda	Linda Valori; L. Bruti; M. Di Paolo; D. De Santis	3	
"Guardami negli occhi (Prego)"	Paolo Meneguzzi	Paolo Meneguzzi; Rosario Di Bella; Luca Mattioni; Dino Melotti	4	
"Guardastelle"	Bungaro	Giuseppe Romanelli; Bungaro	5	Volare Award for Best Music
"Quando l'aria mi sfiora"	Massimo Modugno ft. Gipsy Kings	Mogol; Gianni Bella	6	
"Generale Kamikaze"	Stefano Picchi	Stefano Picchi	7	
"Cuore"	Morris Albert & Mietta	Sergio Dall'Ora; Simone Boffa	8	
"Le ore piccole"	Neffa	Giovanni Pellino	9	
"Crudele"	Mario Venuti	Mario Venuti; Kaballà	10	Mia Martini Critics Award
"Era bellissimo"	DJ Francesco	Francesco Facchinetti; Stefano Lucato; Davide Primiceri; Alberto Rapetti	11	
"È stato tanto tempo fa"	Simone	Simone Tomassini	12	
"Basterà"	DB Boulevard ft. Bill Wyman	Alessio Ventura; Rossano Palù; Dario Benedetti	13	Volare Award for Best Arrangement
"È la musica"	Andrea Mingardi & The Blues Brothers Band	Andrea Mingardi; Maurizio Tirelli	14	
"Lavoro inutile"	Omar Pedrini	Omar Pedrini	15	Volare Award for Best Lyrics
"Sei un miracolo"	Daniele Groff	Daniele Groff; Marco Patrignani	16	
"Nessun consiglio"	Adriano Pappalardo	Roberto Scarpetta; Adriano Pappalardo; Luca Chiaravalli; G. Moretti	17	
"Un angelo legato a un palo"	Veruska	Mogol; Rosario Bella; Gianni Bella	18	
"Il nostro amore"	Andrè	Marco Canigiula; Stefania Labate; Carmelo Labate	19	
"Single"	Danny Losito ft. Las Ketchup	Donato Losito; Massimo Mariello	20	
"Solo un sogno"	Pacifico	Pacifico	21	Volare Award for Best Music
"Ladro di te"	Piotta	Piotta; Emiliano Rubbi; Matteo Altomare	22	

== Musical guests ==
Guests
Artist(s)	Song(s)
The Black Eyed Peas	"Where Is the Love?" "Shut Up"
Aventura	"Obsesion"
Haiducii	"Dragostea din tei"
Natalie Cole	"Non dimenticar" "Unforgettable"
Lionel Richie	"Just For You"
Dolores O'Riordan	"Ave Maria"
Adriano Celentano	"Rip It Up"
