= Viola Valentino =

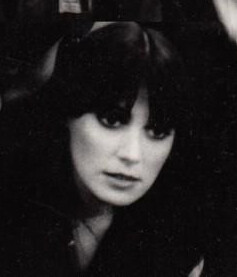

Background information
- Born: Virginia Minnetti; July 1, 1949 (age 77); Canzo, Lombardy, Italy
- Occupations: Singer; actress
- Instrument: Vocals
- Years active: 1968–present
- Spouse: Riccardo Fogli (m. 1971; div. 1993)
- Website: www.violavalentino.it

Virginia Minnetti (born July 1, 1949), best known by her stage name Viola Valentino, is an Italian singer.

== Biography ==
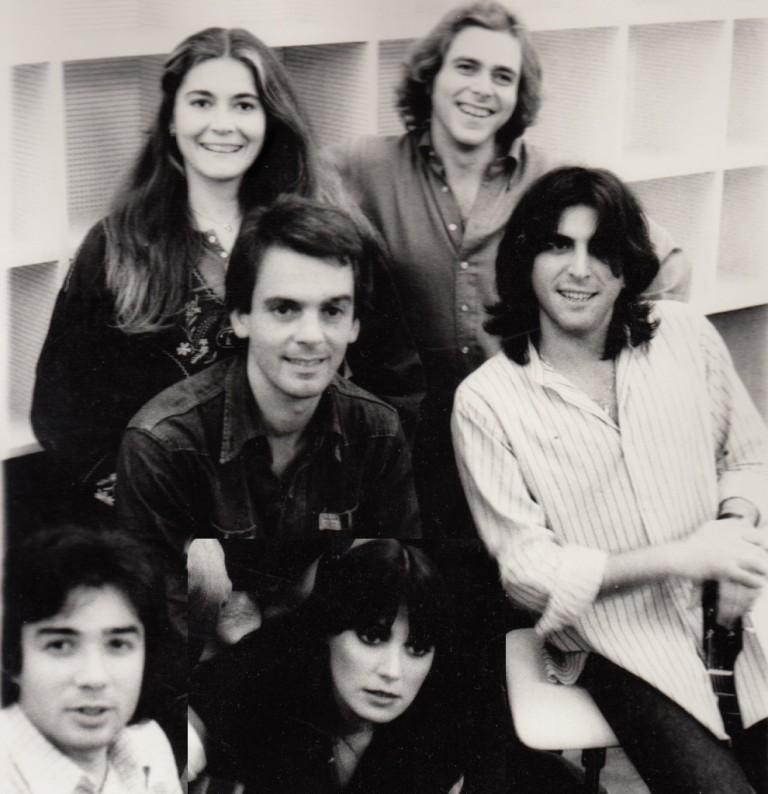
Viola Valentino with Fantasy, musical group including also Carla Vistarini, Tony Cicco, Giancarlo Lucariello, Luigi Lopez and Danilo Vaona

Minnetti started her career as a singer in 1968 under the name Virginia and later began to sing with her then husband in a duet named Renzo & Virginia. Some time later Virginia was noticed by Giancarlo Lucariello, a producer of the Italian rock band Pooh. It was he who created an image of a sexy but delicate woman for her as well as her manner to sing with a subdued voice.

In 1979, Virginia started singing under the name Viola Valentino. Her first song Comprami ("Buy Me") made her famous and was sold in a great number of copies in Italy and Spain.

In 1980, Viola sang two other songs that also become hits, Sei una bomba ("You Are a Bomb") and Anche noi facciamo pace ("We Will Make Peace Too"). In the same year, her first album Cinema ("Cinema") came out.

In 1982, Viola Valentino took part in Sanremo Festival for the first time with the song Romantici ("Romantic") which also became a hit. In the same year, her second album In primo piano ("In the Foreground") and another hit Sola ("Alone") came out. At that time, Viola Valentino was in the zenith of her fame and was invited to act in the film Delitto sull'autostrada ("A Crime on a Highway").

In 1983, she took part in the Sanremo Festival again with the song Arriva arriva ("Come, Come"). Since then, the public interest in Viola Valentino began to fade. In the 1980s, Viola acted in the films Due strani papà ("Two Strange Daddies", 1983) and Le volpi della notte ("Night Foxes", 1986).

In 1986, Viola sang Il posto della luna ("The Place of the Moon"), which had moderate success.

In 1991, an album Un angelo dal cielo ("An Angel from Heaven") came out which included the best songs by Viola Valentino. In 2005 she went to the reality show Musicfarm.

For some time, Viola Valentino was married to a well-known Italian singer Riccardo Fogli, which contributed to her popularity; later, however, they divorced.

Two times Viola's photos were cover photos of Playboy.

== Filmography ==
Year	Title	Role	Notes
1982	Delitto sull'autostrada	Anna Danti	Feature film debut as an actress
1984	Due strani papà	Alessandra	
1986	Le volpi della notte	Anna Calvetti	Television film

== Discography ==
=== Albums ===
- 1978 – Uno (with the band Fantasy)
- 1980 – Cinema
- 1982 – In primo piano
- 1991 – Un angelo dal cielo
- 1994 – Esisto
- 1998 – Il viaggio
- 2004 – Made in Virginia
- 2010 – Alleati non-ovvi

=== EPs ===
- 1985 – L’angelo
- 2009 – I tacchi di Giada

=== Singles ===
- 1968 – Dixie/Pensandoci su (under the name Virginia)
- 1970 – Zan zan/I 10 comandamenti dell’amore (under the name Renzo e Virginia, together with Riccardo Fogli)
- 1978 – Cantando (under the name Fantasy)
- 1979 – Comprami/California
- 1980 – Sei una bomba/Sono così
- 1980 – Anche noi facciamo pace/Sì mi va
- 1981 – Giorno popolare/Prendiamo i pattini
- 1981 – Sera coi fiocchi/Come un cavallo pazzo
- 1982 – Romantici/Rido
- 1982 – Sola/Amiche
- 1983 – Arriva arriva/Balere
- 1984 – Verso sud/Traditi
- 1985 – Addio amor
- 1986 – Il posto della luna/La verità
- 1987 – Devi ritornare/Dentro una notte di festa
- 1991 – Un angelo dal cielo/Quasi mezzanotte
- 1994 – Me marito se n'è ito
- 1994 – Onda tra le onde
- 1995 – Probabilmente niente
- 1996 – Estasi
- 1997 – Anime d’autunno (Libertango)
- 1998 – Come quando fuori piove
- 1999 – Aspettando Elia
- 2000 – Comprami 2000 con Zerodecibel
- 2002 – La surprise de l’amour
- 2004 – Dea
- 2004 – Acqua, fuoco, aria, terra
- 2006 – Barbiturici nel thè
