= Marco Masini =

Italian singer-songwriter, musician and pianist (born 1964)

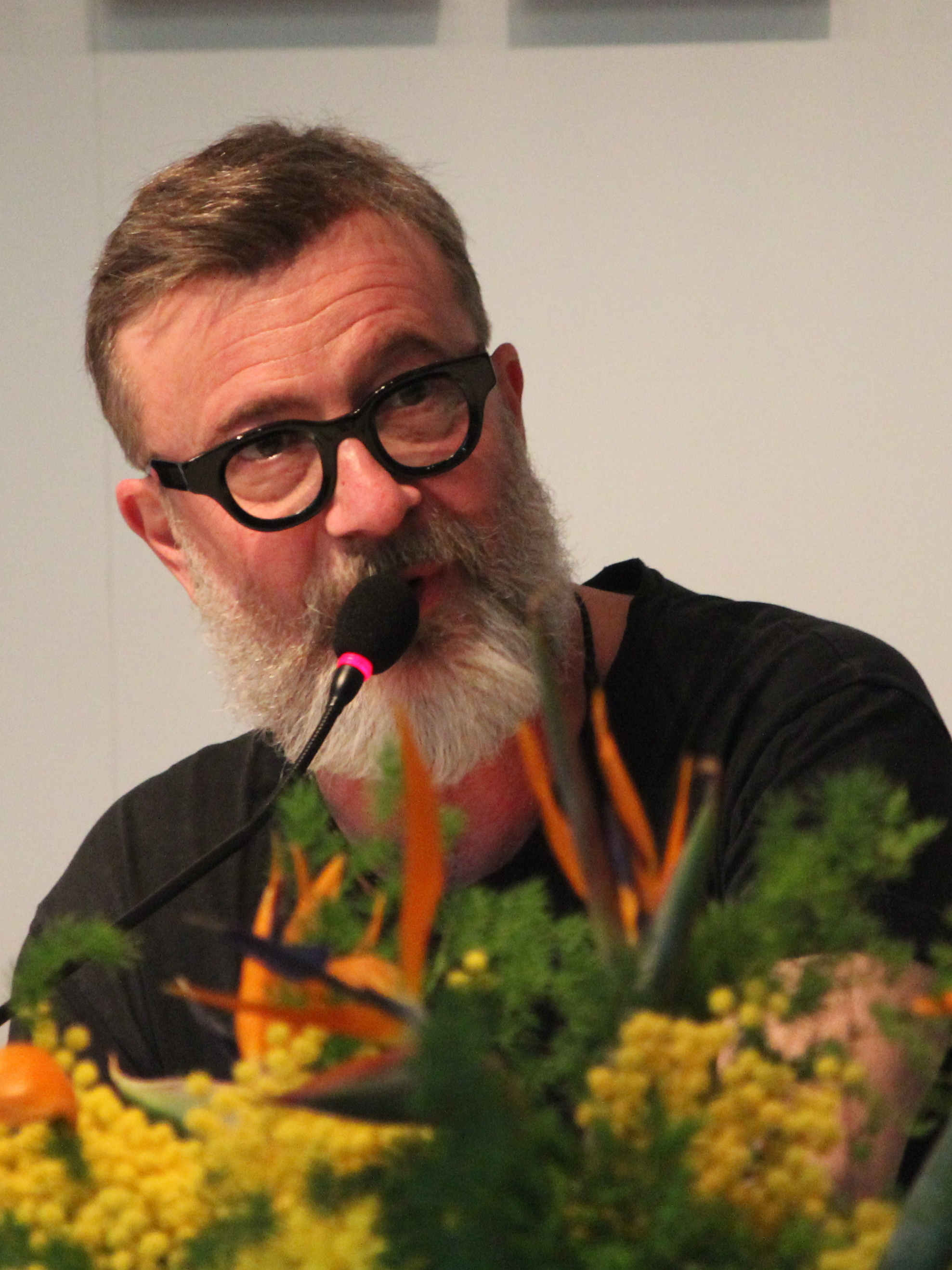
- Marco Masini in February 2026
- Born: 18 September 1964 (age 61); Florence, Italy
- Occupations: Singer; songwriter; musician; pianist
- Years active: 1988–present
- Website: www.marcomasini.it

Marco Masini (born 18 September 1964) is an Italian singer-songwriter, musician and pianist.

== Early years ==
Marco Masini was born in Florence, Tuscany on 18 September 1964. His mother, Anna Maria, sang and played piano. She previously worked as an elementary school teacher before leaving the workforce to raise her family. His father, Giancarlo, worked as a hair product representative.

== Music career ==
Masini's third album, T'innamorerai, was released in 1993. The song "Vaffanculo" ("Fuck off") generated enough controversy to be banned by most radio and television networks. It also contained several negative verses directed at record labels and their policies. At the same time, the album sold more than one million copies worldwide. In an interview for the newspaper Corriere della Sera in 1993, he dedicated the song to "the liars and who call me 'prophet of the depression'," referring to those who consider his music to be too sad.

In January 1995, his fourth album, Il Cielo della Vergine, was released in Italy, Switzerland, Belgium, the Netherlands, Germany, Spain, and Latin America. Two of the songs, "Bella Stronza" ("Beautiful Bitch") and "Principessa", again drew criticism for being too direct and explicit. In 1996, he released L'Amore Sia Con Te, a greatest hits compilation, which included a remastering of "Meglio Solo" from Disperato. This collection was also released with a slightly different track list in Spanish speaking countries under the name Mi amor allí estará. His L'amore Sia Con Te tour kicked off during that summer. In 1997, he sang "La Gente di Cuore" on Enrico Ruggeri's album Domani è un altro giorno. In November 1998, he released the album Scimmie on the Ma label, which he founded with Mario Manzani and Marco Poggione. The album was more inspired by rock music from the 1970s than his previous albums. While reviews from critics were generally positive, the public opinion was that it was a commercial failure.

In 2020, he performed the song "Il confronto" at the Sanremo Music Festival. On 30 November 2025, Masini and Fedez were announced among the participants of the Sanremo Music Festival 2026. They competed with the song "Male necessario".

== Personal life ==
Masini was engaged to Romina Contiero from 2001 to 2005.

== Discography ==
Studio albums

- 1990 – Marco Masini
- 1991 – Malinconoia
- 1993 – T'innamorerai
- 1995 – Il cielo della vergine
- 1998 – Scimmie
- 2000 – Raccontami di te
- 2001 – Uscita di sicurezza
- 2005 – Il giardino delle api
- 2009 – L'Italia...e altre storie
- 2011 – Niente d'importante
- 2017 – Spostato di un secondo

Live albums

- 2004 – Masini live 2004
- 2010 – Un palco lungo... 20 anni!
- 2017 – Marco Masini – In concerto

Compilation albums

- 1996 – L'amore sia con te
- 2003 – .. il mio cammino
- 2004 – Masini
- 2006 – Tozzi Masini
- 2013 – La mia storia...piano e voce
- 2015 – Cronologia
- 2020 – Masini+1 30th Anniversary

Singles

- 1988 – "Uomini" / "Bugie"
- 1990 – "Disperato"
- 1990 – "Ci vorrebbe il mare"
- 1991 – "Perché lo fai"
- 1991 – "Ti vorrei"
- 1991 – "Malinconoia"
- 1993 – "Vaffanculo"
- 1993 – "T'innamorerai"
- 1993 – "La libertà"
- 1995 – "Bella stronza"
- 1995 – "Principessa"
- 1995 – "Cuccioli"
- 1995 – "Il cielo della vergine"
- 1996 – "L'amore sia con te"
- 1998 – "Scimmie"
- 1999 – "Fino a tutta la vita che c'è"
- 1999 – "Lungomare"
- 1999 – "Il giorno di Natale (Il giorno più banale)"
- 2000 – "Raccontami di te"
- 2000 – "Protagonista"
- 2000 – "Ancóra vita è"
- 2001 – "Lasciaminonmilasciare (Leavemedon'tleaveme)"
- 2001 – "Il bellissimo mestiere"
- 2001 – "Vai male a scuola"
- 2003 – "Generation" – feat. Donald D
- 2003 – "Io non ti sposerò"
- 2004 – "L'uomo volante"
- 2004 – "E ti amo"
- 2005 – "Nel mondo dei sogni"
- 2005 – "Il giardino delle api"
- 2005 – "Tutto quello che ho di te"
- 2005 – "Rimani così"
- 2006 – "Maledetta amica mia"
- 2006 – "Cosa rimane (a Marco)" – only for his fan club; written and performed by Andrea Amati in 2002
- 2006 – "Come si fa...?" (with Umberto Tozzi)
- 2007 – "Anima italiana" (with Umberto Tozzi)
- 2007 – "Arrivederci per lei" (with Umberto Tozzi)
- 2009 – "L'Italia"
- 2009 – "Com'è bella la vita"
- 2009 – "Lontano dai tuoi angeli"
- 2011 – "Niente d'importante"
- 2011 – "Non ti amo più"
- 2012 – "Colpevole"
- 2013 – "Io ti volevo"
- 2015 – "Che giorno è"
- 2015 – "Non è vero che l'amore cambia il mondo"
- 2017 – "Spostato di un secondo"
- 2017 – "Tu non esisti"
- 2017 – "Signor tenente" (cover version of Giorgio Faletti)
- 2020 – "Il confronto"
- 2020 – "T'innamorerai" (feat. Francesco Renga); auto-cover of the 1993 homonymous song
- 2020 – "La parte chiara"

Guest appearances

- 1988 – "Dal tuo sguardo in poi" (with Rosita Celentano)
- 1997 – "La gente di cuore" (with Enrico Ruggeri)
- 1997 – "Ci vorrebbe il mare" (with Montserrat Caballé) – (on Friends for Life)
- 2005 – "Voglia di libertà" (on ... a Pierangelo Bertoli)
- 2009 – "Nel blu, dipinto di blu" (with Nazionale Italiana Cantanti; on L'opportunità)
- 2009 – "La canzone del sole" (with Nazionale Italiana Cantanti; on L'opportunità)
- 2009 – "Uno su mille" (with Nazionale Italiana Cantanti; on L'opportunità)
- 2009 – "La forza della vita" (with Nazionale Italiana Cantanti; on L'opportunità)
- 2009 – "Si può dare di più" (with Nazionale Italiana Cantanti; on L'opportunità)
- 2010 – "Donna a-o volante" (with Buio Pesto; on Pesto)
- 2010 – "Dicono così" (with Massimo Alessi)
- 2016 – "Il rumore che fa" (with Raige)
- 2017 – "Va*******o" (with Grido; on Segnali di fumo)
- 2018 – "Io non ti sposerò (Remix)" (with Calibro 40)
- 2018 – "Sesto piano" (with Zibba; on Le cose)
- 2018 – "Chi fermerà la musica" (with Dodi Battaglia; on Dodi Day)
- 2018 – "Pensiero" (with Dodi Battaglia; on Dodi Day)

Others

- 2013 – "Una parte di te" (for R101's Stile libero)

== Books ==
- 1991 – Marco Masini - Il piviere
- 1995 – Per rabbia e per amore
- 2011 – questi nostri 20 anni interminabili
- 2022 - L'altalena. La mia storia

Awards and achievements
Preceded by Mietta with "Canzoni"	Sanremo Music Festival; Winner Newcomers section 1990	Succeeded by Paolo Vallesi with "Le persone inutili"
Preceded by Alexia with "Per dire di no"	Sanremo Music Festival; Winner; 2004	Succeeded by Francesco Renga with "Angelo"
