= Noi due nel mondo e nell'anima =

Single by Pooh

from the album Alessandra
- B-side: "Nascerò con te"
- Released: 1972
- Genre: Pop rock
- Label: CBS
- Songwriter(s): Roby Facchinetti; Valerio Negrini

Pooh singles chronology
"Pensiero" (1971)	"Noi due nel mondo e nell'anima" (1972)	"Cosa si può dire di te?" (1972)

Audio
- "Noi due nel mondo e nell'anima" on YouTube

"Noi due nel mondo e nell'anima" ('The two of us in the world and in the soul') is a 1972 song composed by Roby Facchinetti and Valerio Negrini and performed by the Italian musical group Pooh, as the leading single of their album Alessandra.

The single was released in two versions, the first one released in April 1972 with a totally white cover, the second one released one month later featuring a picture of the band. It stayed 26 weeks on the hit parade. Pooh also recorded the song in Spanish as "Tú y yo en el más allá". Artists who covered the song include Mina and Matia Bazar.

== Track listing ==
No.	Title	Writer(s)	Length
1.	"Noi due nel mondo e nell'anima"	Roby Facchinetti, Valerio Negrini	3:32
2.	"Nascerò con te"	Roby Facchinetti, Valerio Negrini	4:26

== Charts ==
Chart	Peak position
Italy (Musica e dischi)	2
