= Storie di tutti i giorni =

Single by Riccardo Fogli

from the album Collezione
- B-side: "L'amore che verrà"
- Released: 1982
- Genre: Pop
- Label: Paradiso; CGD
- Songwriters: Riccardo Fogli; Guido Morra; Maurizio Fabrizio

Riccardo Fogli singles chronology
"Malinconia" (1981)	"Storie di tutti i giorni" (1982)	"Compagnia" (1982)

Audio
- "Storie di tutti i giorni" on YouTube

"Storie di tutti i giorni" (transl. "Everyday Stories") is a 1982 song performed by Riccardo Fogli and composed by Fogli, Guido Morra and Maurizio Fabrizio. The song won the 32nd edition of the Sanremo Music Festival.

== Background ==
The song marked the Fogli's comeback to the Sanremo Festival eight years after his first disappointing participation, when his song "Complici" did not reach the final. At this time, though, Fogli was fresh from the summer hit "Malinconia", and returned to the Festival as a big favourite.

Fogli's victory aroused widespread controversy: at the time, there was talk of an "announced victory", if not actually previously decided by virtue of agreements made by the record labels. Among other things, the magazine TV Sorrisi e Canzoni devoted the front cover to Fogli three days before the start of the competition, presenting him as the likely winner, and the victory was also successfully predicted by the popular TV magician Giucas Casella, who – "staking his career on it" (as he put it) – during the first night of the show handed a closed envelope with his prediction to the Corriere della Sera music critic Mario Luzzatto Fegiz, who in turn deposited it in a safe at the Sanremo Casino. To these speculations Fogli replied with annoyance, asserting that journalists and insiders had already listened to the songs before the Festival, and that, evidently, the song had simply been considered the best one.

The song eventually was a massive success, topping the hit parade for three weeks and becoming Fogli's signature song. In 1994, Marco Borsato recorded a cover version of the song in the Dutch language, "Dromen zijn bedrog" ("Dreams are deception"), which topped the Dutch hit parade for 12 weeks.

== Track listing ==
- 7" single
1. "Storie di tutti i giorni" (Maurizio Fabrizio, Riccardo Fogli, Guido Morra)
2. "L'amore che verrà" (Maurizio Fabrizio, Riccardo Fogli, Guido Morra)

== Charts ==
Chart (1982)	Peak position
Italy (Musica e dischi)	1
Switzerland (Schweizer Hitparade)	7
West Germany (Official German Charts)	30
