= Uomini soli =

Single by Pooh

from the album Uomini soli
- B-side: "Concerto per un'oasi"
- Released: 3 March 1990
- Genre: Pop
- Label: CGD
- Songwriters: Roby Facchinetti; Valerio Negrini

Pooh singles chronology
"Donne italiane" (1989)	"Uomini soli" (1990)	"L'altra donna" (1990)

Audio
- "Uomini soli" on YouTube

"Uomini soli" (Italian: [ˈwɔːmini ˈsoːli]; 'Lonely Men') is a 1990 song composed by Roby Facchinetti and Valerio Negrini and performed by the Italian pop band Pooh. The song won the 40th edition of the Sanremo Music Festival, where it was also performed in an English-language soul adaptation titled "Angel of the Night" by Dee Dee Bridgewater.

== Background ==
The song was initially planned to be sung by the sole Roby Facchinetti, but after the band's choice of entering the Sanremo Festival it was re-structured to leave one verse to each member. Pooh's record label Compagnia Generale del Disco's first choice for the festival was "Donne italiane", which was eventually released a few months before.

== Release ==
The song premiered at the Sanremo Music Festival 1990 on 1 March 1990, during the second night of the festival. It was released as a single on 3 March, with the instrumental "Concerto per un'oasi" as B-side.

== Reception ==
The song was the last single of the band to top the Italian hit parade. It was certified gold. It has been described as "built on a simple structure and on a measured and almost minimal arrangement".

== Other versions ==
Dee Dee Bridgewater released the English version "Angel of the Night" as a single in 1990, and included it in her 1992 album All of Me. Pooh recorded a Spanish-language of the song titled "Hombres Solos". Artists who covered the song include Hélène Ségara and Wilma De Angelis.

== Track listing ==
- 7" single
1. "Uomini soli" (Roby Facchinetti, Valerio Negrini)
2. "Concerto per un'oasi" (Roby Facchinetti)

== Charts ==
Chart (1990)	Peak position
Italy (Musica e dischi)	1
Italy Airplay (Music & Media)	1
