= Buio Pesto =

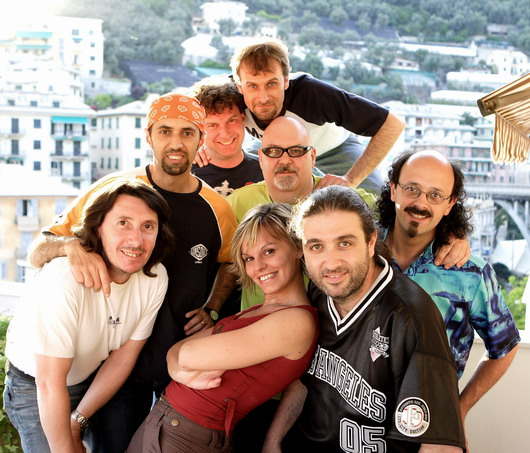
Buio pesto

Buio Pesto is a musical band from the small town of Bogliasco near Genoa, Italy.

The name of the group is an Italian way to describe something very dark, but at the same time the word pesto can also refer to the typical Ligurian pasta sauce, pesto. As a matter of fact the band's logo, characterized by a strong green colour, resembles a Ligurian basil leaf, which is the most important ingredient for pesto.

The musical style varies from rock, to rap, to reggae and to folk music. The most important characteristic of their lyrics is the strong sarcasm and comic irony which gives the music a peculiar goliardic touch. In 2005, Genoa gave Buio Pesto the Disco D'Oro (Gold record) because they reached 50,000 albums sold.

== History ==
Buio Pesto were founded in 1983, although their very "professional" period started in 1992 with the recording of their first album, Voglio una fidanzata (I want a Girlfriend), published first by Deadline / Discomagic and then in 1996 by Sony. Significantly, in 1995 the music career of Buio Pesto changed fully, along with their decision to sing in the local language, Ligurian.

From then until now, they have sold 60,000 records and performed more than 400 concerts (with a total of 680,000 people among the audience), while collecting more than 254,000,000 Lire for charity. Their second album, Cosmolandia, was released in 1998 and sold more than 3,000 copies; it contains an unedited song Cosmolandia as sung by Franco Malerba, the first Italian astronaut in space for NASA in 1992 with the Space Shuttle Atlantis STS-46. In 1999 the Space Shuttle Discovery STS-103 was launched from Cape Canaveral transporting the album on board . Cosmolandia was the first Italian song album to fly to space.

Buio Pesto even produced the first sci-fi movie entirely shot in Italy: InvaXön - Alieni in Liguria. They have had various guests in some of their albums such as Marco Masini and Elio e le Storie tese, and Ligurian folk singer Piero Parodi.

== Band ==
The main members of the band are:

- Massimo Morini – main vocals and keyboards
- Nino Cancilla – bass
- Gianni Casella – vocals
- Federica Saba – vocals
- Massimo Bosso – lyrics, vocals and production
- Giorgia Vassallo – vocals

== Former members ==
- Davide Ageno – guitar and vocals
- Danilo Straulino – drums
- Maurizio Borzone – violin and vocals

The staff of Buio Pesto counts 45 members altogether. The initial group comprised Alex Pagnucco (bass) and Andrea "Pagen" Paglierini (vocals).

== Discography ==
Dead Line / Discomagic

- Voglio una fidanzata

Grigua/Discolandia

- Belinlandia (1995)
- Cosmolandia (1998)
- Colombo (2000)
- Zeneize (2001)
- Paganini (2001)
- Basilico (2004)
- Palanche (2006)
- Liguria (2008)
- Pesto (2010)
- Zeneize (2012)
- Buio Pesto (2014)
- Liguri (2016)

Videolandia / Discolandia

- Belin che video! (2001)
- Buio Pesto al Teatro Carlo Felice (2002)
- Buio Pesto (2005)
