= Sanremo Music Festival 1982 =

Italian song contest (32nd edition)

Dates and venue
- Semi-final 1: 28 January 1982
- Semi-final 2: 29 January 1982
- Final: 30 January 1982
- Venue: Teatro Ariston; Sanremo, Italy

Organisation
- Broadcaster: Radiotelevisione italiana (RAI)
- Presenters: Claudio Cecchetto and Patrizia Rossetti

Vote
- Number of entries: 30
- Winner: "Storie di tutti i giorni" Riccardo Fogli

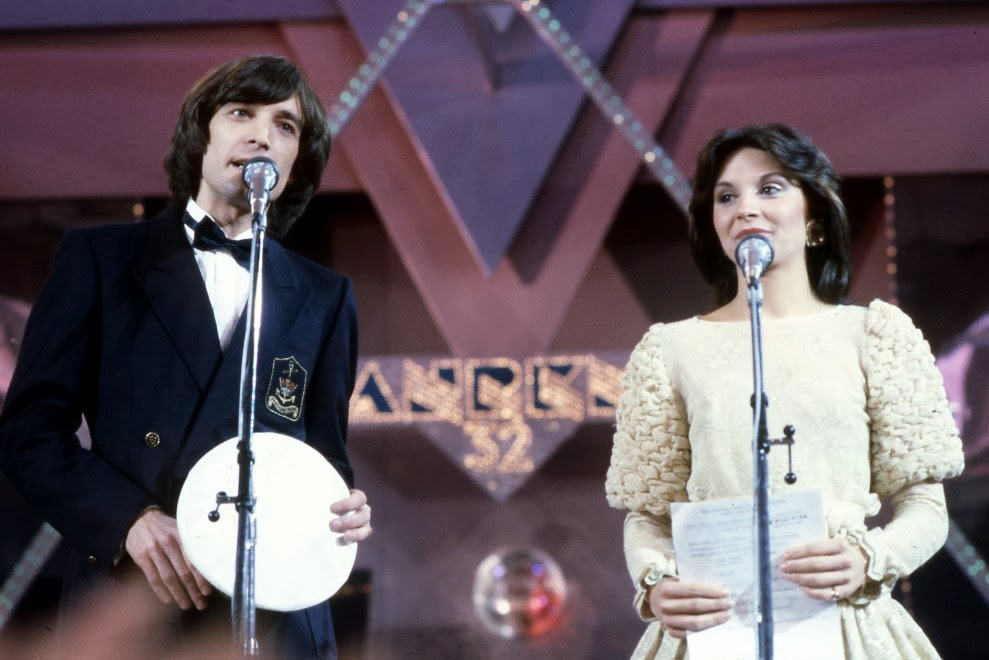
Claudio Cecchetto and Patrizia Rossetti hosting Sanremo 1982

The Sanremo Music Festival 1982 (Italian: Festival di Sanremo 1982), officially the 32nd Italian Song Festival (32º Festival della canzone italiana), was the 32nd annual Sanremo Music Festival, held at the Teatro Ariston in Sanremo between 28 and 30 January 1982 and broadcast by Radiotelevisione italiana (RAI). The show was hosted by Claudio Cecchetto, assisted by Patrizia Rossetti. Daniele Piombi hosted the segments from the Sanremo Casino, where a number of foreign guests performed their songs.

The winner of the festival was Riccardo Fogli with the song "Storie di tutti i giorni". In addition, this was the first edition to feature the Critics Award, which was won by Mia Martini with "E non finisce mica il cielo".

== Participants and results ==
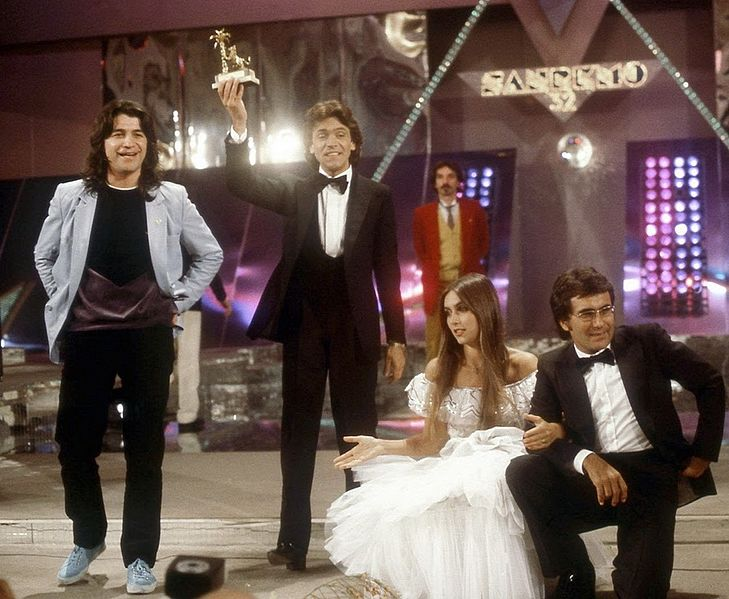
The first three places in the Festival (L–R): Drupi, Riccardo Fogli, Al Bano & Romina Power

Big Artists section
Song	Artist(s)	Songwriter(s)	Rank
"Storie di tutti i giorni"	Riccardo Fogli	Riccardo Fogli; Guido Morra; Maurizio Fabrizio	1
"Felicità"	Al Bano and Romina Power	Cristiano Minellono; Gino De Stefani; Dario Farina	2
"Soli"	Drupi	Drupi; Gianni Belleno; Vittorio De Scalzi	3
"Beguine"	Jimmy Fontana	Franco Migliacci; Jimmy Fontana; Lilli Greco; Luigi Pellegrino	Finalist
"Blue Hotel"	Lene Lovich	Mauro Goldsand	Finalist
"C'è"	Elisabetta Viviani	Mario Balducci	Finalist
"E non finisce mica il cielo"	Mia Martini	Ivano Fossati	Finalist/Critics Award
"Io no"	Anna Oxa	Oscar Avogadro; Mario Lavezzi	Finalist
"Lisa"	Stefano Sani	G. Iozzo; Zucchero Fornaciari; R. Marsella	Finalist
"Marinai"	Le Orme	Alberto Salerno; D'Amico; Antonio Pagliuca; Aldo Tagliapietra	Finalist
"Non voglio ali"	Riccardo Del Turco	Riccardo Del Turco	Finalist
"Ping pong"	Plastic Bertrand	De Pasquale; G. Pirazzoli; Franco Fasano	Finalist
"Quando incontri l'amore"	Milk and Coffee	Silvio Subelli; Ignazio Polizzy; Claudio Natili; Giancarlo Nisi	Finalist
"Romantici"	Viola Valentino	Guido Morra; Maurizio Fabrizio	Finalist
"Sei la mia donna"	Mal	Cristiano Minellono; Duilio Sorrenti; Giuseppe Santamaria	Finalist
"Sette fili di canapa"	Mario Castelnuovo	Mario Castelnuovo	Finalist
"Solo grazie"	Giuseppe Cionfoli	Giuseppe Cionfoli	Finalist
"Strano momento"	Roberto Soffici	Roberto Soffici; Andrea Lo Vecchio	Finalist
"Tu stai"	Bobby Solo	Bobby Solo	Finalist
"Un'altra vita un altro amore"	Christian	Mario Balducci	Finalist
"Una notte che vola via"	Zucchero	Adelmo Fornaciari	Finalist
"Vado al massimo"	Vasco Rossi	Vasco Rossi	Finalist
"America in"	Orietta Berti	Daniele Pace; Mario Panzeri; Corrado Conti	Eliminated
"Biancaneve"	Rino Martinez	Paolo Dossena; Rino Martinez	Eliminated
"Centomila amori miei"	Marina Lai	Minimum; Adelio Cogliati; Bibap	Eliminated
"Cuore bandito"	Julie	Elio Palumbo; Sebastiano	Eliminated
"Facciamo la pace"	Claudio Villa	Claudio Villa; Roberto Ferri	Eliminated
"Non arrenderti mai"	Piero Cassano	Vito Pallavicini; Luigi Albertelli; Piero Cassano	Eliminated
"Una rosa blu"	Michele Zarrillo	Paolo Amerigo Cassella; Michele Zarrillo; Totò Savio	Eliminated
"Una sporca poesia"	Fiordaliso	Pinuccio Pirazzoli; Franco Fasano; Depsa	Eliminated

== Guests ==
Guests
Artist(s)	Song
Diego Abatantuono	"Eccezziunale...veramente"
Gloria Gaynor	"I Kinda Like Me"
Donovan & Astrella Leiych	"Love Is Only Feeling"
Stray Cats	"Rock This Town"
Marco Lucchinelli	"Stella fortuna"
Johnny Hallyday	"Solo una preghiera"
America	"Survival"
Marianne Faithfull	"Sweetheart"
Kiss	"I"
Hall & Oates	"Private Eyes"
Village People	"Do You Wanna Spend the Night"
Nino Manfredi	"La frittata"
Claudia Mori	"Non succederà più"
Bee Gees	"He's a Liar"
Van Halen	"Pretty Woman"
Australian International Entertainment dancers	Performing between guests

== Broadcasts ==
=== Local broadcasts ===
All shows were broadcast on Rete Uno.

=== International broadcasts ===
Known details on the broadcasts in each country, including the specific broadcasting stations and commentators are shown in the tables below.

International broadcasters of the Sanremo Music Festival 1982
Country	Broadcaster	Channel(s)	Commentator(s)	Ref(s)
United States	WNJU-TV (Note: Delayed broadcast in a shortened format on 21 March at 15:00 (EDT))			
