= Pensiero =

Single by Pooh

from the album Opera prima
- B-side: "A un minuto dall'amore"
- Released: 1971
- Genre: Pop rock
- Label: CBS
- Songwriters: Roby Facchinetti; Valerio Negrini

Pooh singles chronology
"Tanta voglia di lei" (1971)	"Pensiero" (1971)	"Noi due nel mondo e nell'anima" (1972)

Audio
- "Pensiero" on YouTube

"Pensiero" ('Thought') is a 1971 song composed by Roby Facchinetti and Valerio Negrini. It is performed by the Italian musical group Pooh.

== Background ==
The melody of the song was composed by Roby Facchinetti with the intent of being performed chorally by all members of the group. The lyrics went against the wishes of both their producer and their record company, as it deals with social criticism about the story of a man unjustly imprisoned. The tensions between the producer Giancarlo Lucariello and the drummer-lyricist Valerio Negrini eventually led the latter to leave the group (even if keeping on collaborating with them as lyricist) and being replaced by Stefano D'Orazio.

== Release ==
The single was released on 28 September 1971 and it was the second Pooh single in a row to top the Italian hit parade. It sold over 850,000 copies. Pooh also recorded the song in Spanish as "Pensamiento". In 1998, Negrini and Facchinetti sued Alanis Morissette for plagiarism of the song "Mary Jane", eventually losing the case.

== Track listing ==
No.	Title	Writer(s)	Length
1.	"Pensiero"	Roby Facchinetti, Valerio Negrini	4:15
2.	"A un minuto dall'amore"	Roby Facchinetti, Valerio Negrini	3:52

== Charts ==
Chart	Peak position
Italy (Musica e dischi)	1
