= Disperato =

Single by Marco Masini

from the album Marco Masini
- B-side: "Meglio solo"
- Released: 1990
- Genre: Pop
- Length: 4:15
- Label: Ricordi
- Songwriters: Marco Masini, Giancarlo Bigazzi, Giuseppe Dati

Marco Masini singles chronology
"Uomini" (1988)	"Disperato" (1990)	"Ci vorrebbe il mare" (1990)

Audio
- "Disperato" on YouTube

"Disperato" ('Desperate') is a 1990 song composed by Marco Masini, Giancarlo Bigazzi and Giuseppe Dati and recorded by Marco Masini. The song won the newcomer section as well as the critics award at the 40th edition of the Sanremo Music Festival.

The song has been described as "a portrait of the discomfort and the complexity of teenage angst."

== Track listing ==
7" single – SRL 11101

No.	Title	Writer(s)	Length
1.	"Disperato"	Masini, Bigazzi, Dati	4:15
2.	"Meglio solo"	Masini, Bigazzi, Dati	4:39

== Charts ==
=== Weekly charts ===
Chart (1990)	Peak position
Italy (Musica e dischi)	7
Italy Airplay (Music & Media)	5

=== Year-end charts ===
Chart (1990)	Position
Italy	10
