= Red Canzian =

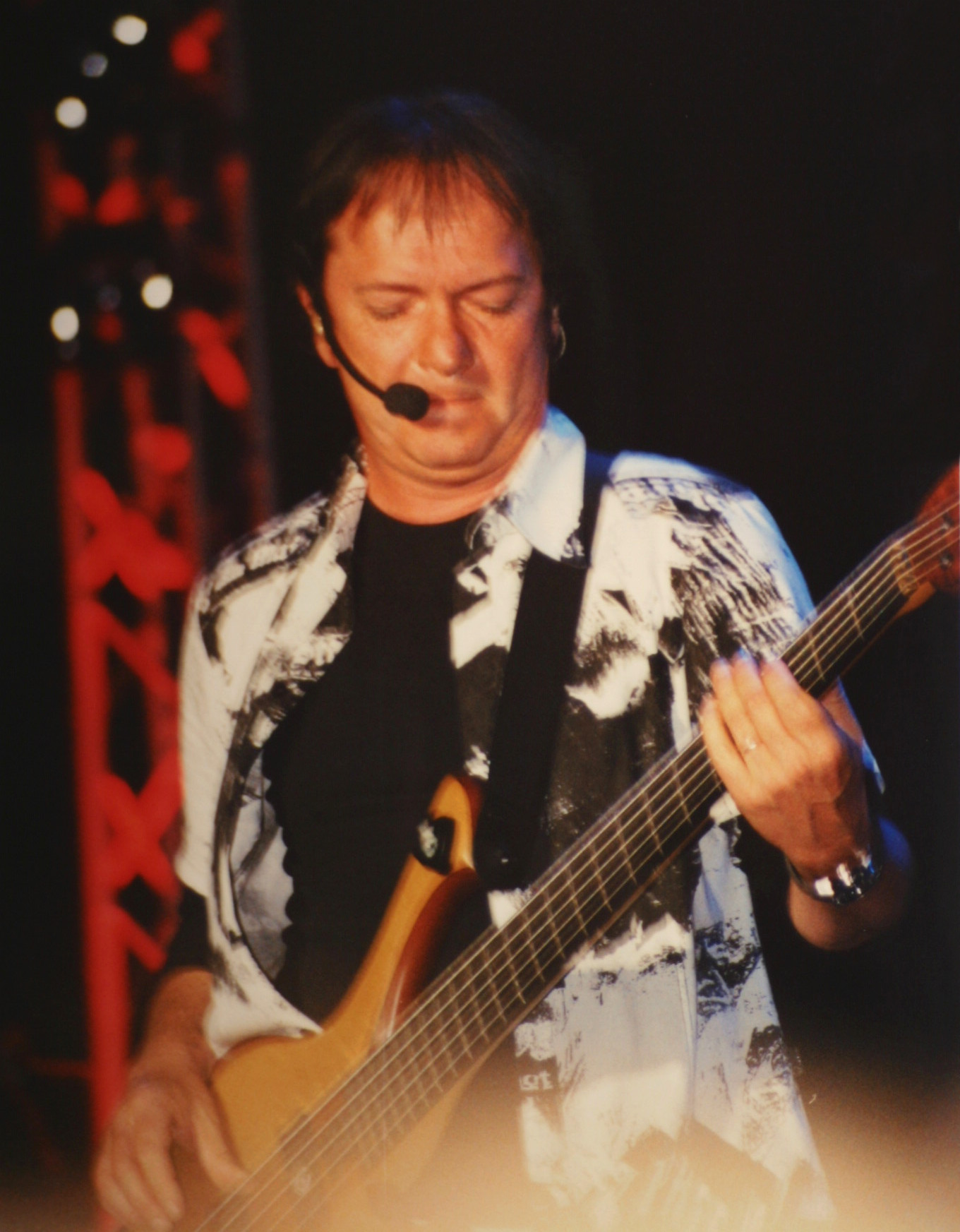

Background information
- Born: 30 November 1951 (age 74); Quinto di Treviso, Italy
- Origin: Italy
- Genre: pop rock
- Occupations: Musician, singer, songwriter, writer
- Instruments: Vocals, guitar, bass guitar
- Years active: 1968-2021 2022-in attività
- Label: CGD
- Website: Official website

Bruno "Red" Canzian (born 30 November 1951) is a songwriter, lead vocalist and bassist of the Italian band Pooh.

He considers himself Catholic. He is vegan.

== Discography ==
- Io e Red (1986)
- L'istinto e le stelle (2014)
- Testimone del Tempo (2018)

== Singles ==
- "Rosso Natale" (1986)
- "Il calcio del sorriso" (1998)
- "Anima biancoverde" (2007)

== Works ==
- Canzian, Red (1992). Magia dell'albero: grandi alberi d'Europa in natura e coltivati a bonsai (in Italian). Photographs by Elio Ciol. Milan: Fabbri. ISBN 88-450-4426-2.
- Canzian, Red (1993). Un albero per la vita: progetto didattico-naturalistico per le scuole elementari (in Italian) (2 ed.). Castel Goffredo: Cassa rurale ed artigiana. ICCU IT\ICCU\RMB\0551906.
- Canzian, Red (1997). Storie di vita e di fiori (in Italian). Milan: Mondadori. ISBN 88-04-43272-1.
- Canzian, Red (2012). Ho visto sessanta volte fiorire il calicanto (in Italian). Milan: Mondadori. ISBN 978-88-04-62176-8.
- Canzian, Red; Canzian, Chiara (2017). Sano vegano italiano: storie e ricette (in Italian). Foreword by Pietro Leemann; recipes photographs by Giulia Fedel. Milan: Rizzoli. ISBN 978-88-918-1194-3.
