= Pooh (band) =

Italian pop band

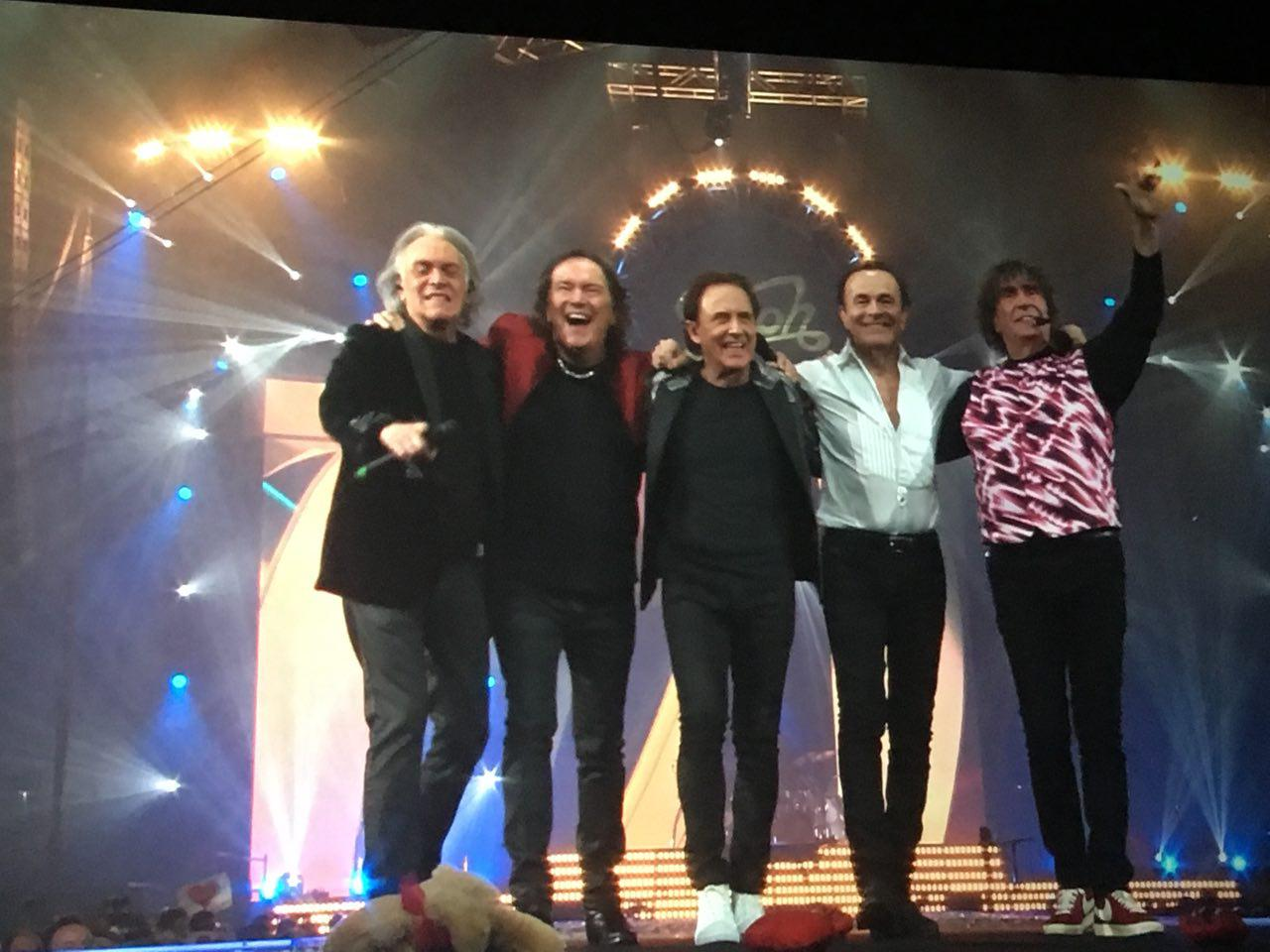
- Pooh during their last concert in Bologna, 2016

Background information
- Origin: Bologna, Italy
- Genres: Pop; progressive pop
- Years active: 1966–2016; 2023–present
- Labels: Vedette; CBS; Compagnia Generale del Disco
- Members: Roby Facchinetti; Dodi Battaglia; Red Canzian; Riccardo Fogli
- Past members: Stefano D'Orazio; Valerio Negrini; Mauro Bertoli; Gilberto Faggioli; Bob Gillot; Mario Goretti
- Website: www.pooh.it

Pooh is an Italian pop band formed in Bologna in 1966. The group is known for songs such as "Parsifal", Dove comincia il sole ("Where the Sun Begins"), Pensiero ("Thought"), and Uomini soli ("Lonely Men").

== History ==
=== 1960s ===
In 1962, drummer Valerio Negrini and guitarist Mauro Bertoli established the band Jaguars in Bologna, forming the nucleus of what would later become Pooh. In 1964, Jaguars consolidated its first stable line-up, composed of Negrini, Bertoli, vocalist Vittorio Costa, bassist Giancarlo Cantelli, and rhythm guitarist and keyboardist Bruno Barraco. In 1965, Costa left the band to pursue medical studies, while keyboardist Bob Gillot and rhythm guitarist Mario Goretti joined.

In January 1966, the Jaguars signed a recording contract with Vedette, Armando Sciascia's record company. As the name Jaguars had already been taken by another band that had recorded a single, the group decided to adopt a new name. Sciascia's secretary, Aliki Andris, a fan of Winnie-the-Pooh, suggested the name Pooh. In February 1966, Pooh recorded its first single, "Vieni fuori", a cover of "Keep on Running" by the Spencer Davis Group. At the end of April, keyboardist Roby Facchinetti from Bergamo replaced Gillot. The band's first album, For Those Like Us, was released in late 1966.

In April 1967, Vedette released the band's fourth single, "Nel buio"/"Cose di questo mondo". Shortly afterwards, Mauro Bertoli left the group following his marriage, and the band became a quartet.

In April 1968, the group first entered the record charts with "Piccola Katy", originally the B-side of the single "In silenzio", which reached fifteenth place on the Italian hit parade. Following the release of their second album and a summer concert tour, Mario Goretti left the band in September 1968, returning to Bologna where he later founded an amplifier company. This was despite the success of "In silenzio"/"Piccola Katy", in which he participated as guitarist.

Goretti was replaced by Donato "Dodi" Battaglia, a sixteen-year-old guitarist from Bologna. He had been noticed by Enrico Marescotti during a local event where he performed an electric guitar solo by The Shadows. A former member of the Meteors, who also accompanied Gianni Morandi, Battaglia went on to play a significant role in Pooh's development.

That same year, relations between Pooh and Vedette deteriorated following the release of their second album, Contrasto, in July 1968. The album was issued without the band's knowledge while they were on tour and was soon withdrawn from the market. The record largely contained audition recordings and discarded material, although it did include the successful single "Piccola Katy".

=== 1970s ===
In 1971, Pooh moved to CBS, where they began working with producer Giancarlo Lucariello. The single "Tanta voglia di lei" reached number one within two weeks. "Pensiero" achieved the same result and sold over one million copies. Both singles also topped the South American charts, selling 450,000 and 1,200,000 copies respectively. In November 1971, the band released the album Opera Prima.

That year, Valerio Negrini left the group while continuing as a lyricist. He was replaced by drummer Stefano D'Orazio, who had previously played with I Naufraghi and Il Punto, the latter of which had appeared on the cover of Ciao 2001, a leading Italian music weekly at the time. Some songs were recorded in English, such as "Tutto alle tre", adapted as "The Suitcase" for inclusion in a CBS compilation. "Tanta voglia di lei" also placed second at the Festivalbar.

In 1972, the band released "Noi due nel mondo e nell'anima", backed with "Nascerò con te". CBS promoted both tracks equally, issuing the single as a double A-side. "Noi due nel mondo e nell'anima" was promoted on radio, while "Nascerò con te" was distributed to jukeboxes. Around this time, the band began using the Minimoog synthesiser. The album Alessandra marked a stronger vocal presence from Roby Facchinetti and included Dodi Battaglia's first credited composition.

Under Lucariello's direction, Alessandra was arranged with Franco Monaldi's orchestra and featured only love songs. Electric guitar was largely replaced by acoustic arpeggios. Soon after, Riccardo Fogli left to pursue a solo career, citing Lucariello's preference for Battaglia's vocals. In early 1973, bassist Red Canzian, formerly of Osage Tribe and Capsicum Red, joined the band.

In 1973, Pooh released Parsifal, which combined symphonic pop influences with Facchinetti's melodic style. The title track was notable for its extended instrumental second half. "Lettera da Marienbad" appeared as the B-side of "Io e te per altri giorni" and was included on the stereo 8 version of the album.

In 1974, the compilation I Pooh (1971–1974) was issued, while the albums Un po' del nostro tempo migliore and Forse ancora poesia followed in 1975. These albums featured symphonic arrangements, harpsichord, and long instrumental passages, but achieved only modest commercial success. "Ninna nanna", the single from Forse ancora poesia, reached the top 10. Creative differences with Lucariello over orchestration led the group to begin self-producing, one of the first examples of this approach in Italy.

In 1976, Pooh released Poohlover, which included more direct arrangements and lyrics addressing social themes such as homosexuality, prostitution, and marginalisation. The singles "Pierre" and "Linda" restored their chart success, with "Linda" reaching the top position. That year, the band marked its tenth anniversary with a concert in Piazza San Marco, Venice.

In 1977, Facchinetti, Battaglia, and D'Orazio, with Negrini on vocals, recorded a single under the name "Mediterraneo System". The band also contributed instrumental tracks to the television drama La gabbia, including "Risveglio", which later featured in a kitchen advertisement. In the same year, Pooh began staging concerts in stadiums with elaborate lighting and stage effects. They also appeared on Domenica in with Corrado. The single "Dammi solo un minuto" preceded the album Rotolando respirando, their first release under CGD.

The album was initially remixed due to technical issues, with the final version completed at Stone Castle Studios in Carimate. In 1978, the compilation Pooh 1975–1978 was released, followed by the album Boomerang. Boomerang featured synthesisers and electric guitar while dispensing with orchestral arrangements.

Successful tracks from this period included "Cercami", "Giorno per giorno", "Pronto buongiorno è la sveglia", "Classe '58", and "Il ragazzo del cielo (Lindbergh)". Around this time, the band adopted a new logo designed by Paolo Steffan. In early 1979, the single "Fantastic Fly" / "Odyssey" was released as part of the television series Fantastic Tales, based on the works of Edgar Allan Poe.

Later in 1979, Pooh released Viva, which sold over 700,000 copies. The single "Io sono vivo" remained on the charts for over 51 weeks, while "Notte a sorpresa", "Ultima notte di caccia", "Tutto adesso", and "In concerto" also became popular. "Io sono vivo" and "Notte a sorpresa" were among the first Italian singles to be promoted with music videos. Several songs from Viva were later used in the 1979–1980 season of Domenica in.

=== 1980s ===
In 1980, Pooh released Hurricane, an album featuring English-language versions of their most popular songs from the previous three years, aimed at the international market. The record did not enter the American or British charts but was later issued in Italy, where it achieved gold certification. That same year, ... Stop was released, featuring the single "Canterò per te" (with "Stagione di vento" as the B-side) and tracks including "Inca", "Vienna", "Aria di mezzanotte", "Ali per guardare", and "Occhi per volare".

In February 1981, the compilation Pooh 1978–1981 was released, containing 12 songs, including two previously unreleased tracks: "Giorno per giorno" and "Tu sei tu, io resterò me". In September, the studio album Buona fortuna appeared, featuring the summer single "Chi fermerà la musica", the title track, the autobiographical "Banda nel vento" (earlier released as a B-side), and "Dove sto domani". The video for "Chi fermerà la musica" showed the band members exchanging roles.

In spring 1982, the group issued Palasport, their first live album, recorded during their 1981 autumn tour. The double album included retrospective material from their first 15 years, along with two new songs performed on tour: "Canzone per l'inverno" and "Siamo tutti come noi". Later that year, the single "Non siamo in pericolo" (with "Anni senza fiato" as the B-side) was released.

In 1983, Pooh recorded Tropico del Nord at studios in Montserrat, Caribbean. It was the first Italian LP released on compact disc, including an additional track, "Breakfast in New York". The album also featured "Solo voci", an a cappella piece inspired by the Beatles' "Because". Music videos were produced for several tracks, later compiled into the special L'anno del Tropico, distributed on VHS. No official singles were released, although multiple tracks were promoted domestically and abroad. After a large-scale tour, the band also performed in smaller venues during their "Club Tour 83", reviving earlier songs such as "Eleonora mia madre", "Infiniti noi", "Classe '58", and "La città degli altri".

During these sessions, Roby Facchinetti composed material for his first solo album, Roby Facchinetti. In 1984, the band travelled to Maui, Hawaii, to record Aloha at George Benson's studio. The album included "Boys of the World", "Come si fa", and darker-themed tracks such as "Selvaggio" and "Il giorno prima", the latter addressing the threat of nuclear conflict. "La mia donna", arranged at Lahaina Studios, featured vocals shared by all four members and a solo by Dodi Battaglia. The use of the Fairlight synthesiser characterised much of the album's sound.

The subsequent Italian tour introduced electronic drums played by Stefano D'Orazio, with performances opening to the synthesised sounds of "Selvaggio". Rai broadcast a one-hour television special featuring videos filmed in Hawaii, later issued in 2003 as Pooh's first official DVD. By the end of 1984, the band released Pooh 1981–1984, a double compilation of 19 tracks, including nine previously unreleased on LP and seven unreleased on CD.

In 1985, Dodi Battaglia released his first solo album, Più in alto che c'è, which included a title track written with Vasco Rossi. That same year, Pooh recorded Asia non Asia in Japan, an album with a strong emphasis on synthesisers and electronic guitars. The song "Se c'è un posto nel tuo cuore", sung by Stefano D'Orazio, was used as the theme for Il corso del lunedì, while "Se nasco un'altra volta" was promoted as the lead single and performed at the Festivalbar. In 1986, Vedette issued the compilation C'è amore negli occhi tuoi.

To mark the group's 20th anniversary, Giorni infiniti was released in 1986 on white vinyl. The album combined acoustic arrangements with contemporary technologies and featured a brass section led by Demo Morselli. Songs included "Terry B.", inspired by a 1985 Milan news story involving model Terry Broome, "C'est difficile mais c'est la vie", "Venti", and "L'altra parte del cielo", which reintroduced the Hammond organ. That year, Red Canzian also issued his first solo album, Io e Red. The band was honoured at the wax museum in Rome and appointed Knights of the Italian Republic. Their 1986 winter tour was released on a triple live album, followed in 1987 by another live album, Goodbye.

Also in 1987, the studio album Il colore dei pensieri was released, featuring the ecological-themed "Acqua dalla luna" and "Dall'altra parte", a song reflecting on political change in the Soviet Union. In 1988, Oasi marked the beginning of Pooh's collaboration with the WWF. Songs such as "Nell'erba, nell'acqua, nel vento" addressed environmental concerns, while "Senza frontiere" focused on racial discrimination. Other tracks, such as "Che vuoi che sia" and "La ragazza con gli occhi di sole", reflected their melodic tradition. In 1989, Pooh released the instrumental maxi-single Concerto per un'oasi in a limited edition, donating all proceeds to the WWF. That year also saw the release of the compilation Un altro pensiero.

=== 1990s ===
The 1990s opened with one of the few achievements still missing from Pooh's career: winning the Sanremo Music Festival in March 1990 with the song "Uomini soli". The band performed it with Dee Dee Bridgewater, who later recorded an English-language version titled "Angel of the Night". At the end of the performance, Dodi Battaglia revealed that the group had unsuccessfully attempted to enter the festival twenty years earlier. Shortly afterwards, the album Uomini soli was released, featuring tracks such as "L'altra donna" (written and sung by Battaglia), "Giulia si sposa" (written and sung by Stefano D'Orazio), and "Tu vivrai" (with contributions from Eros Ramazzotti, Umberto Tozzi, Raf, and Enrico Ruggeri).

In December 1990, the double compilation 25: La nostra storia was released, followed by a theatre tour. In 1992, Pooh issued Il cielo è blu sopra le nuvole, which included the singles "Maria marea", "50 primavere", "Stare senza di te", and "La mia faccia". This album marked the end of their collaboration with arranger Fio Zanotti, which had begun in 1986 with Giorni infiniti. The band stated in interviews that Zanotti had reused arrangements and sounds from their work in other projects.

In 1993, internal tensions emerged when Canzian, Battaglia, and D'Orazio prevented Facchinetti from presenting the song "Vivrò" at Sanremo. The track later appeared on Facchinetti's second solo album, Fai col cuore.

In 1994, Pooh released Musicadentro, an album of new material arranged by Battaglia. It was largely recorded live in the studio to capture the group's energy. The CD was issued in a round metal box, reportedly inspired by Public Image Ltd.'s Metal Box. The singles "Le canzoni di domani" and "Cento di queste vite" were promoted with music videos. Despite these efforts, the album sold about 100,000 copies, making it their least successful release since 1971. Notable songs included "Dietro la collina", "Senza musica senza parole" (featuring lyrics structured with chain-linked phrases), and "Un leone nel cielo", a tribute by Battaglia to his father Medardo.

In 1995, the group released their third live double album, Buonanotte ai suonatori, which included a new title track. That December, the six-disc box set Poohbook was issued, containing 86 tracks to celebrate their 30th anniversary. That year, Canzian published his first book, Albero del bene e del male, while D'Orazio launched the fanzine Poohnews, which provided updates and anecdotes about the band's activities.

In 1996, Pooh returned to commercial success with Amici per sempre, featuring the singles "Amici per sempre", "La donna del mio amico", and "Cercando di te". The production was marked by internal disputes over arrangements and song choices, including a conflict regarding "Il silenzio della colomba", which was replaced with "Sempre in amore mai". At one point, Battaglia considered leaving the band and recorded separately from the others. Ultimately, the album's success, aided by arranger Emanuele Ruffinengo, prevented a split.

In February 1997, Arnoldo Mondadori Editore published the band's first official biography, Quello che non sai, written by journalist Franco Dassisti. In November, the double anthology The Best of Pooh was released, including 28 hits and two new songs: "Brava la vita" and "Non lasciarmi mai più", the latter becoming particularly successful.

In 1998, the compilation Un minuto prima dell'alba was issued, the first of six discs in the Poohbook box set released between 1993 and 1995. That year, the group re-recorded several of their 1960s tracks with updated arrangements, including "Brennero 66", "E dopo questa notte", and "La solita storia".

In 1999, Pooh released Un posto felice, featuring singles such as "Dimmi di sì", "Se balla da sola", and "Mi manchi". These songs received strong airplay, allowing the band to appear at the Festivalbar and perform in large venues. "Dimmi di sì", written by D'Orazio, stood out for its Eurobeat-influenced style.

That summer, the final concert of their tour, held in Arezzo, was broadcast by Mediaset and later issued on VHS. Mediaset had previously broadcast their 25th anniversary concert in 1991, performed at the Arena Garibaldi in Pisa, which concluded the "25 Summer Tour: La nostra storia".

=== 2000s ===
The new millennium opened with the release of Cento di queste vite (2000), which marked a return to the sound of the 1970s. Several singles were issued from the album, including "Resto con te", "I respiri del mondo", "Un grande amore" and the closing track "Mi senti ancora", a song dedicated to a fan who had died in a car accident, featuring an extended instrumental coda.

In 2001, to celebrate their 35th anniversary, Pooh released the collection Best of the Best, presented in two versions: a double CD and a single CD, the latter including a live track from the Cento di queste vite tour. Both versions contained three new songs. "Portami via", written by Red Canzian, served as the lead single. "E arriverà", a ballad composed by Dodi Battaglia with lyrics by Stefano D'Orazio, was also included, though it received little radio attention. The third new track, "Figli", anticipated the group's forthcoming musical project.

In 2002, Pooh began work on a stage musical directed by Saverio Marconi. Initially, Roby Facchinetti had developed music for an original story centred on a messianic character, Gabriel, but the group eventually chose to adapt Pinocchio, one of the world's most widely read books. The project led to the release of the album Pinocchio (2002), containing 11 songs suitable for performance outside the musical. Staged by Compagnia della Rancia, the production became one of the most successful Italian musicals of the period and premiered at the newly built Teatro della Luna in Assago, near Milan. The album was well received by critics, though its sales were lower than previous releases. The lead single was "Il Paese dei Balocchi", followed by "Voglio andare via", "Vita" and "Un vero amico".

In 2003, the cast recording Pinocchio – Il grande musical was released as a double CD, performed by the musical's actors and musicians, with Pooh contributing only limited parts, including Dodi Battaglia's acoustic guitar on "Vita". That year, Battaglia also released the instrumental album D'assolo, featuring guest appearances by Franco Mussida and Maurizio Solieri. The same year saw the release of Aloha, the group's first DVD, containing restored footage of their 1984 Hawaiian stay and promotional clips. In February, Pooh received the "Musica e solidarietà" award from the band Nomadi for their involvement in Rock No War initiatives.

During the early 2000s, Pooh gained renewed popularity among younger audiences, in part due to references in the sitcom Camera Café, where the character Paolo Bitta (played by Paolo Kessisoglu) was portrayed as a devoted fan. The band made guest appearances in four episodes.

In 2008, Pooh embarked on a tour organised by Milano Concerti, affiliated with Live Nation. That year and the next, they also contributed to several collaborative projects: they reinterpreted "Piccola Katy" with Neri per Caso on Angoli diversi; recorded "Eternità" with Ornella Vanoni for her album Più di me; and worked with Claudio Baglioni on a rearranged version of "Che begli amici" for his project Q.P.G.A. (2009).

In April 2009, the group announced the release of the double album Ancora una notte insieme, which appeared on 8 May, followed by a tour that began in July at the Royal Palace of Caserta. During the tour, drummer Stefano D'Orazio announced his decision to leave the group after 38 years. The tour expanded from its initial four dates to 38, concluding with two performances at the Mediolanum Forum in Assago. The second concert was broadcast live on RTL 102.5 and covered on television, including live links to X Factor on Rai 2.

From 1 October 2009, Pooh continued as a trio consisting of Facchinetti, Battaglia and Canzian. That year, the videoclip for "Ancora una notte insieme", directed by Andrea Falbo and Andrea Gianfelice, won a Special Prize at the Italian Videoclip Awards. On 26 November, the band's career was chronicled in I nostri anni senza fiato, published by Rizzoli.

=== 2010s ===
In February 2010, Pooh announced Aladin, a musical written by Stefano D'Orazio with music composed in collaboration with his three former bandmates. Work on the project had begun before D'Orazio's departure from the group. On 5 March, a DVD of the band's final concerts with him, recorded in Assago on 28 and 30 September 2009, was released.

At a press conference on 3 March 2010, Pooh confirmed that they would continue as a trio with Roby Facchinetti, Dodi Battaglia and Red Canzian. The three had already performed two concerts at the Fallsview Casino near Niagara Falls, Canada. The group announced that they would be joined on drums by session musician Steve Ferrone, known for his work with Eric Clapton, the Bee Gees, Tom Petty and George Harrison. Ferrone played on the album Dove comincia il sole, released on 12 October 2010. Its title track, a rock suite divided into a six-minute vocal section and a five-minute instrumental, was compared to earlier Pooh works such as Parsifal and Il tempo, una donna, la città.

On the Dove comincia il sole tour, Pooh were joined by Ferrone, guitarist Ludovico Vagnone, and keyboardist/arranger Danilo Ballo. The tour began on 23 November 2010 in Rimini and continued until summer 2011, with further concerts in Italy and abroad through early 2012. From 2011, Ferrone was replaced by Phil Mer, son of Red Canzian's wife. The tour drew about 500,000 attendees in total, with many concerts sold out. On 29 April 2011, the three members performed alongside D'Orazio on the television programme Ciak… si canta! from Naples.

On 11 October 2011, the group released Dove comincia il sole Live – 27 agosto 2011 – Castello di Este, available as a double CD, double DVD, and a deluxe edition with additional content. Later that month they performed at Niagara Falls with the World Rock Symphony Orchestra of Toronto, followed by a concert in Sofia, Bulgaria, with the Classic FM Orchestra.

In March 2012, Pooh released Pooh Legend, a box set curated by Andrea Pedrinelli, including four DVDs and four books. In October 2012, they announced Opera seconda, an album recorded with the Ensemble Symphony Orchestra conducted by Giacomo Loprieno, followed by a theatre tour.

On 3 January 2013, founding member and lyricist Valerio Negrini died of a heart attack while on holiday in Trentino. Later that year, Pooh continued their Opera seconda tour, performing in Italy, Canada and the United States. On 29 October, they released Pooh Box, a set dedicated to Negrini containing live CDs and DVDs, a graphic novel illustrated by Gianni D'Angelo, and two tribute CDs featuring Italian voice actors. The tour recorded over 150,000 attendees across nearly 100 performances.

==== Reunion and retirement ====
On 28 September 2015, Pooh announced a 50th anniversary reunion with D'Orazio returning on drums and Riccardo Fogli rejoining as vocalist. The project included seven large-scale concerts: two at San Siro in Milan, one at the Stadio Olimpico in Rome, one at the Stadio San Filippo in Messina, and three at the Verona Arena. A triple album and live DVD from the Milan concerts were also announced, along with a nationwide arena tour. Five-part vocal arrangements of earlier songs such as "Pensiero", "Noi due nel mondo e nell'anima", "Chi fermerà la musica", "Piccola Katy", and "Pierre" were released, together with four new songs: "Tante storie fa", "Le cose che vorrei", "Ancora una canzone" and "Traguardi". These were included on the triple live album Pooh 50 – L'ultima notte insieme, released on 16 September 2016.

On 30 December 2016, Pooh concluded their career with a final concert at the Unipol Arena in Casalecchio di Reno, broadcast live in cinemas, on television and on radio. They briefly reunited on 6 June 2017 at the Verona Arena for the Wind Music Awards. In July 2017, the box set Trilogia (1987–1990) was released on CD and vinyl, containing Il colore dei pensieri, Oasi, Uomini soli, and a bonus disc from Live in Milan (1990), along with a 60-page booklet. On 23 November 2018, the triple album and DVD Pooh 50 – L'ultimo abbraccio, recorded at their farewell concert, were released.

On 6 November 2020, D'Orazio died following complications related to COVID-19, after a week of hospitalisation.

==== Second reunion ====
In April 2023, the surviving members reunited to mark the group's 55th anniversary and released a new single, "Amici per sempre".

== Discography ==
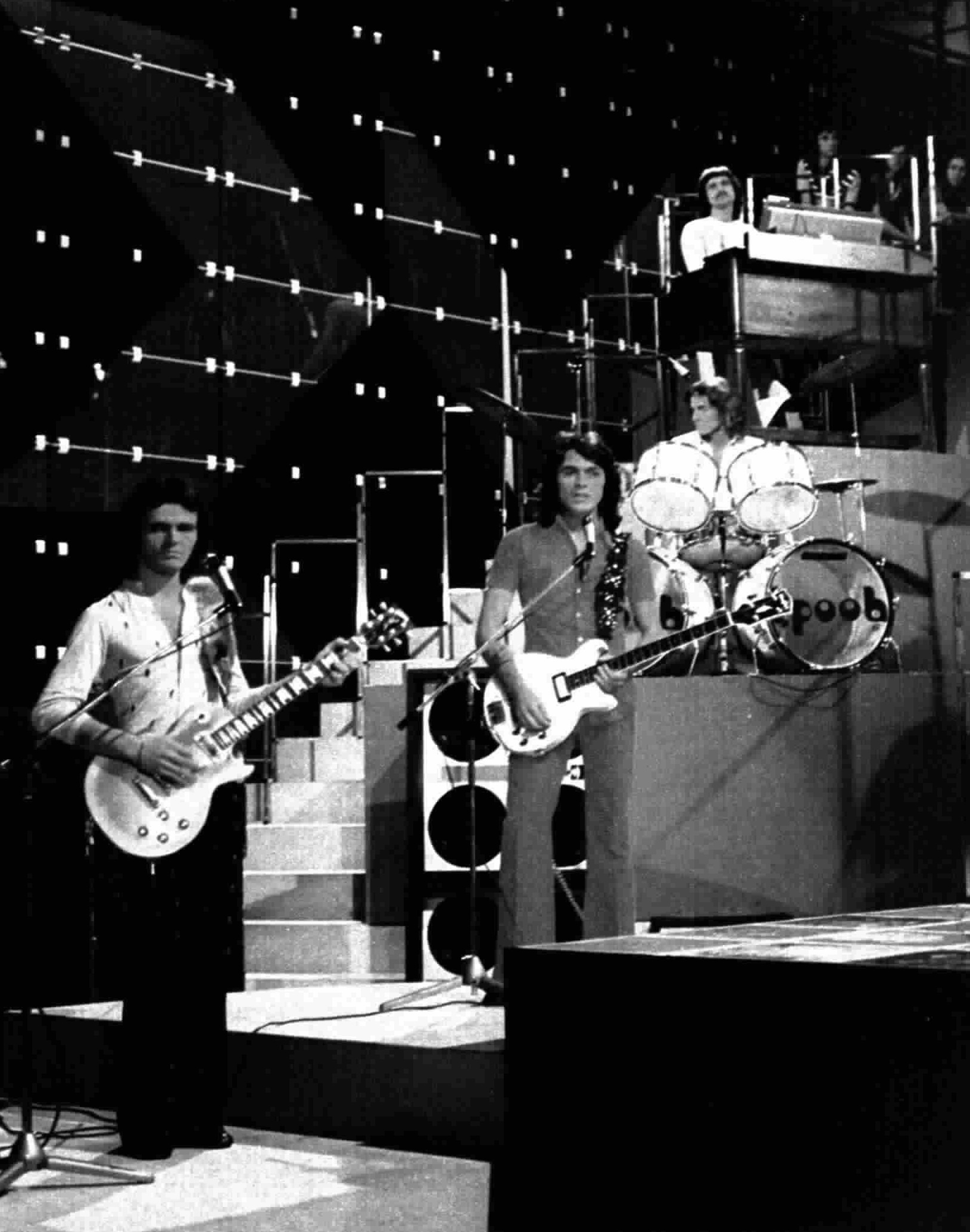
Pooh in 1972

=== Studio albums and compilations ===
- Per quelli come noi (1966)
- Contrasto (1968)
- Memorie (1969)
- Opera prima (1971)
- Alessandra (1972)
- Parsifal (1973)
- I Pooh 1971–1974 (1974)
- Un po' del nostro tempo migliore (1975)
- Forse ancora poesia (1975)
- Poohlover (1976)
- Rotolando respirando (1977)
- I Pooh 1975–1978 (1978)
- Boomerang (1978)
- Viva (1979)
- Hurricane (1980)
- ...Stop (1980)
- I Pooh 1978–1981 (1981)
- Buona fortuna (1981)
- Palasport (1982)
- Tropico del nord (1983)
- Aloha (1984)
- I Pooh 1981–1984 (1984)
- Anthology (1985)
- Asia non Asia (1985)
- Giorni infiniti (1986)
- Goodbye (1987)
- Il colore dei pensieri (1987)
- Oasi (1988)
- Un altro pensiero (1989)
- Uomini soli (1990)
- La nostra storia (1990)
- Il cielo è blu sopra le nuvole (1992)
- Musicadentro (1994)
- Buonanotte ai suonatori (1995)
- Poohbook (1995)
- Amici per sempre (1996)
- The Best of Pooh (1997)
- Un minuto prima dell'alba (1998)
- Un posto felice (1999)
- Cento di queste vite (2000)
- Best of the Best (2001)
- Pinocchio (2002)
- Pinocchio – Il grande Musical (2003)
- Ascolta (2004)
- La grande festa (2005)
- Noi con voi (2006)
- Noi con voi – Versione integrale (2007)
- Beat Regeneration (2008)
- Per quelli come noi (Remastered) (2008)
- Ancora una notte insieme (2009) (ITA # 2 – Platinum)
- Dove comincia il sole (2010)
- Dove comincia il sole live (2011)
- Opera seconda (2012)

=== Singles ===
- "Vieni fuori" ("Keep On Running") / "L'uomo di ieri" (10 February 1966)
- "Bikini Beat" / "Quello che non sai" ("Rag Doll") (29 April 1966)
- "Brennero '66" / "Per quelli come noi" (3 October 1966)
- "Nel buio" ("I Looked in the Mirror") / "Cose di questo mondo" (15 April 1967)
- "In silenzio" / "Piccola Katy" (2 February 1968)
- "Buonanotte Penny" / "Il tempio dell'amore" (16 October 1968)
- "Mary Ann" / "E dopo questa notte" (9 April 1969)
- "Goodbye Madame Butterfly" / "Un minuto prima dell'alba" (17 November 1969)
- "Tanta voglia di lei" / "Tutto alle tre" (28 April 1971)
- "Pensiero" / "A un minuto dall'amore" (28 September 1971)
- "Noi due nel mondo e nell'anima" / "Nascerò con te" (21 April 1972)
- "Cosa si può dire di te" / "Quando una lei va via" (21 October 1972)
- "Io e te per altri giorni" / "Lettera da Marienbad" (5 June 1973)
- "Infiniti noi" / "Solo cari ricordi" (5 September 1973)
- "Se sai, se puoi, se vuoi" / "Inutili memorie" (20 May 1974)
- "Per te qualcosa ancora" / "E vorrei" (5 November 1974)
- "Ninna nanna" / "È bello riaverti" (25 July 1975)
- "Linda" / "Donna davvero" (21 July 1976)
- "Risveglio" / "La gabbia" (23 March 1977)
- "Dammi solo un minuto" / "Che ne fai di te" (28 September 1977)
- "Cercami" / "Giorno per giorno" (28 April 1978)
- "Fantastic Fly" / "Odissey" (11 December 1978)
- "Io sono vivo" / "Sei tua, sei mia" (16 May 1979)
- "Notte a sorpresa" / "Tutto adesso" (16 November 1979)
- "Canterò per te" / "Stagione di vento" (14 April 1980)
- "Chi fermerà la musica" / "Banda nel vento" (21 April 1981)
- "Buona fortuna" / "Lascia che sia" (16 November 1981)
- "Non siamo in pericolo" / "Anni senza fiato" (21 October 1982)
- "Se nasco un'altra volta" / "Per chi merita di più" (20 June 1986)
- "Donne italiane" / "Davanti al mare" (11 December 1989)
- "Uomini soli" / "Concerto per un'oasi" (2 February 1990)
- "Se balla da sola" (23 March 1999)
- "Dimmi di sì" (23 July 1999)
- "Portami via" (19 October 2001)
- "Il paese dei balocchi" (25 October 2002)
- "Capita quando capita" (21 April 2004)
- "Ascolta" (1 September 2004)
- "Per dimenticare te" (17 December 2004)
- "La grande festa" (18 November 2005)
- "Cuore azzurro" (25 May 2006)

== Band members ==
=== Current members ===
- Roby Facchinetti (born 1944) – vocals, keyboards (1966–2016, 2023–present)
- Dodi Battaglia (born 1951) – vocals, guitars (1968–2016, 2023–present)
- Red Canzian (born 1951) – vocals, bass (1974–2016, 2023–present)
- Riccardo Fogli (born 1947) – vocals, bass, guitar (1966–1974, 2015–2016, 2023–present)

=== Former members ===
- Stefano D'Orazio (1948–2020) – vocals, drums (1971–2009, 2015–2016)
- Valerio Negrini (1946–2013) – drums (1966–1970)

Awards and achievements
Preceded by Anna Oxa & Fausto Leali with "Ti lascerò"	Sanremo Music Festival; Winner; 1990	Succeeded by Riccardo Cocciante with "Se stiamo insieme"
