= Dodi Battaglia =

Italian musician

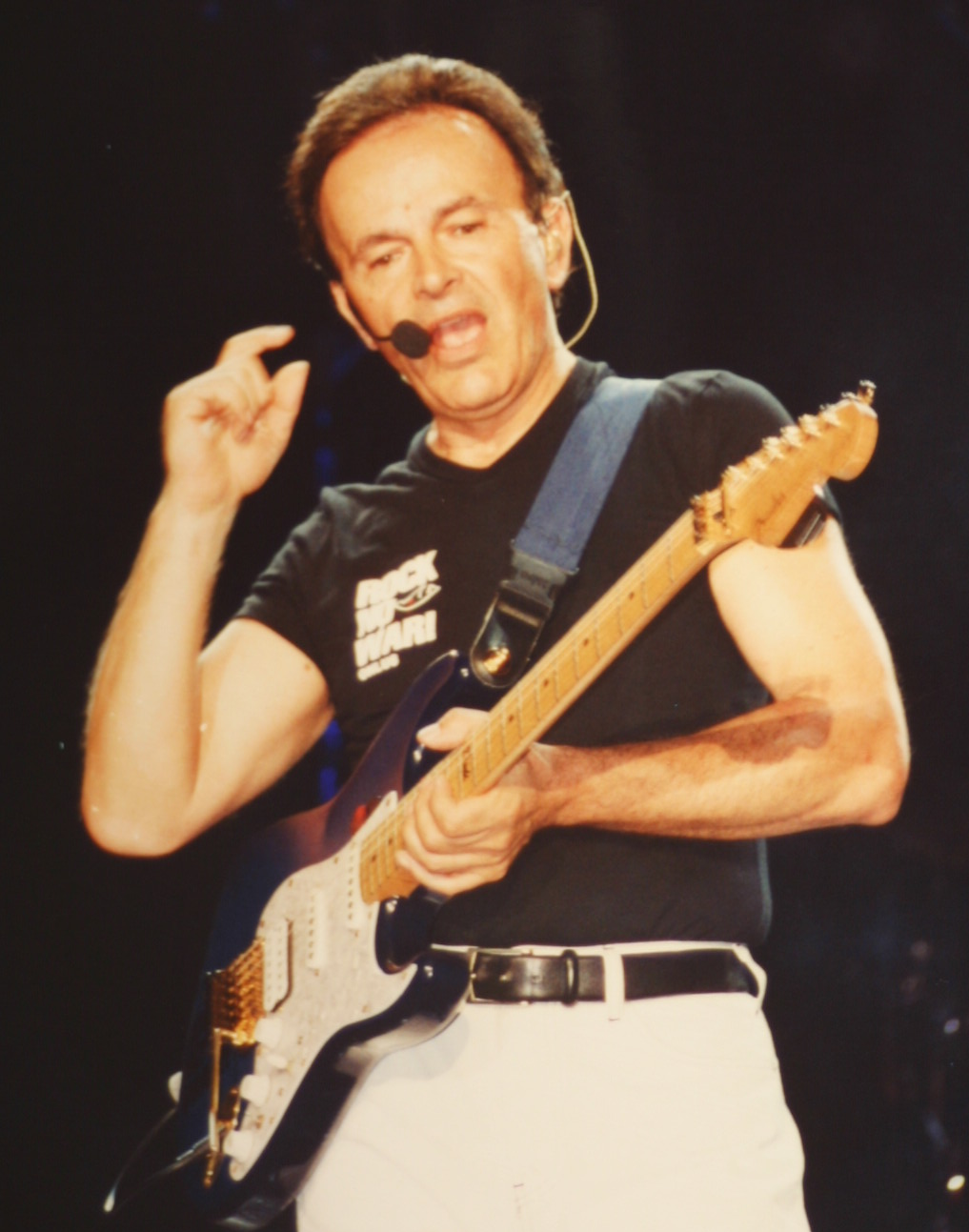
- Battaglia performing in 2004

Background information
- Born: Donato Battaglia; 1 June 1951 (age 75); Bologna, Italy
- Genres: Pop, Rock
- Occupations: Musician, songwriter
- Instruments: Guitar, vocals
- Years active: 1966–present
- Member of: Pooh

Donato "Dodi" Battaglia (born 1 June 1951) is an Italian guitarist, singer and songwriter known as a member of the pop group Pooh.

Born at Bologna, Battaglia joined Pooh as lead guitarist in 1968. Together with Roby Facchinetti, he was the main songwriter starting from the LP Alessandra of 1972. Battaglia was part of the Pooh until they split up in 2016. He also published several solo albums and singles and occasionally collaborated as session musician for other famous italian artists.

== Discography ==
=== Solo albums ===
- 1985 – Più in alto che c'è
- 1986 – Più in alto che c'è/Ciao amore buon appetito
- 2003 – D' Assolo
- 2015 – Dov'è andata la musica (with Tommy Emmanuel)
- 2017 – E la storia continua
- 2018 – Dodi Day
- 2019 – Perle

=== With Pooh ===
- 1968 – Contrasto
- 1969 – Memorie
- 1971 – Opera prima
- 1972 – Alessandra
- 1973 – Parsifal
- 1975 – Un po' del nostro tempo migliore
- 1975 – Forse ancora poesia
- 1976 – Poohlover
- 1977 – Rotolando respirando
- 1978 – Boomerang
- 1979 – Viva
- 1980 – ...Stop
- 1981 – Buona fortuna
- 1983 – Tropico del nord
- 1984 – Aloha
- 1985 – Asia non-Asia
- 1986 – Giorni infiniti
- 1987 – Il colore dei pensieri
- 1988 – Oasi
- 1990 – Uomini soli
- 1992 – Il cielo è blu sopra le nuvole
- 1994 – Musicadentro
- 1996 – Amici per sempre
- 1999 – Un posto felice
- 2000 – Cento di queste vite
- 2002 – Pinocchio
- 2004 – Ascolta
- 2008 – Beat ReGeneration
- 2010 – Dove comincia il sole
