= Riccardo Fogli =

Italian singer (born 1947)

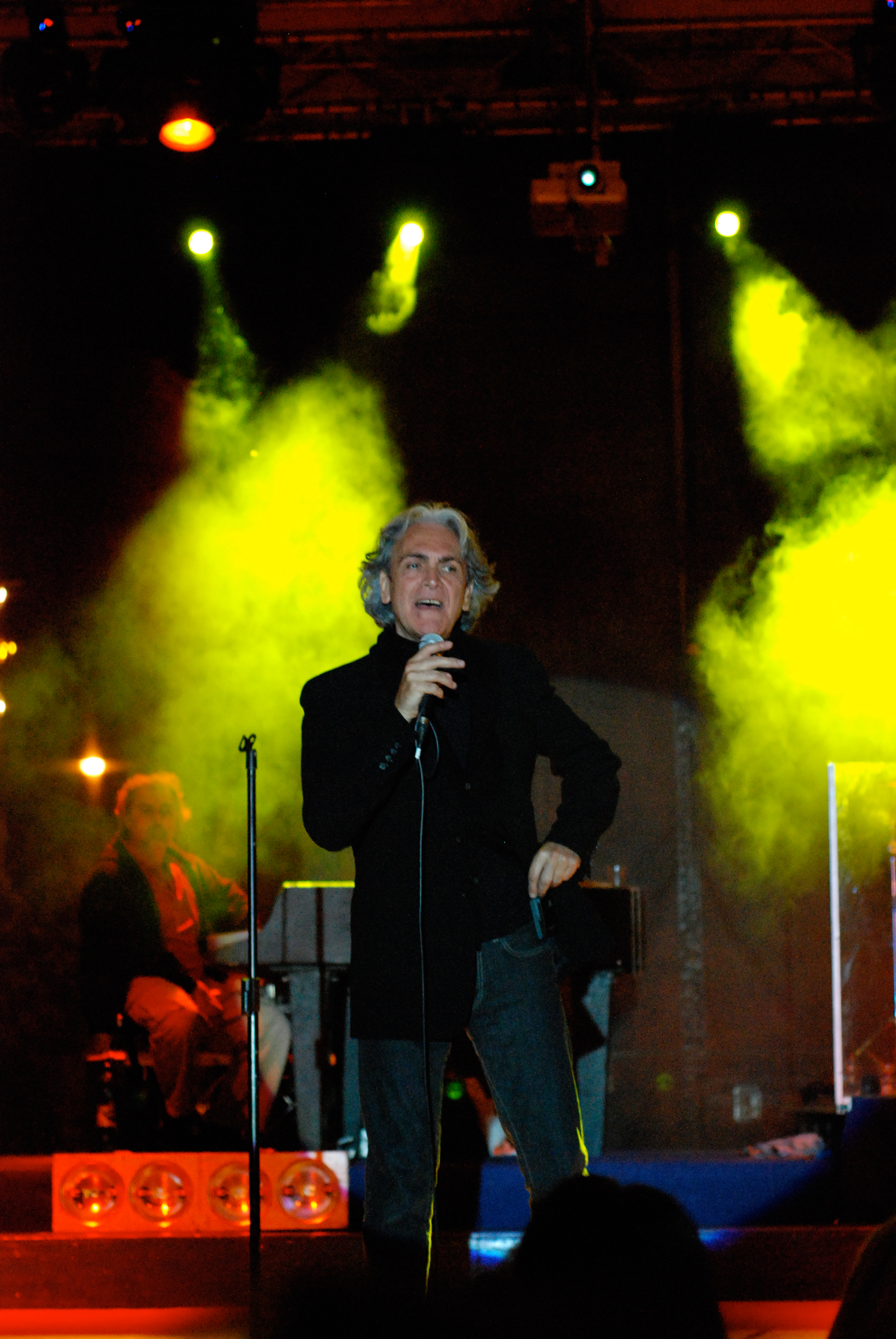
- Fogli performing in 2009

Background information
- Born: 21 October 1947 (age 78); Pontedera, Tuscany, Italy
- Occupation: Singer-songwriter
- Spouses: Viola Valentino (m. 1971; div. 1993) Karin Trentini (m. 2010)
- Website: Official website

Riccardo Fogli (born 21 October 1947) is an Italian singer-songwriter.

== Biography ==
=== Early career ===
Riccardo Fogli was born on 21 October 1947 in Pontedera. He was fond of music since his childhood and taught himself to play the electric bass guitar. At 14 years old he started working in the Piaggio factory.

In 1964, at the age of 17, Fogli joined the band The Slenders & Tony Rio. Two years later, in 1966, he became the lead singer of Pooh. In 1973, at the peak of popularity with the band, because of personal problems (the breakup of his marriage and a tempestuous relationship with singer Patty Pravo), he left Pooh and started his solo career.

In 1973, Fogli issued his first album Ciao amore come stai (Hello, Love, How Are You?), which was followed by his second album Riccardo Fogli in 1976; the song "Mondo" ("World") from this album became a hit.

=== 1980s ===
The 1980s were a pinnacle of success for Riccardo Fogli. In this period, the lyrics of his songs became more philosophical and his singing manner became more emotional. In 1981, Fogli performed one of his most famous and lyrical song, "Malinconia" ("Melancholy"), and in 1982 he was the winner of the Festival di Sanremo with his other hit "Storie di tutti i giorni" ("Everyday Stories") His 1982 album Collezione (Collection) was issued in nearly a million copies in Western Europe, Japan and the USSR, where he became particularly popular.

Riccardo Fogli participated in Eurovision Song Contest with the entry "Per Lucia" ("For Lucia") in 1983; he finished in 11th place and received 41 points.

In 1994, a Dutch version of his hit "Storie di tutti i giorni" - now titled "Dromen zijn bedrog" ("Dreams are fake") - was a huge hit for Dutch/Italian singer Marco Borsato in the Netherlands and Belgium. The single sold over 140,000 copies and remained at number one in the Dutch Top 40 for 12 weeks, which was a record at the time.

=== 2010s ===
In 2016, he reunited with Pooh for the final tour, which celebrated the 50 anniversary of band foundation.

== Personal life ==
Fogli was married to and then divorced from the Italian singer Viola Valentino. Then he fell in love with Patty Pravo, and later with Stefania Brassi; with Stefania he had a son. He married then Italian model Karin Trentini and they have a daughter. He considers himself Roman Catholic.

== Discography ==
=== Albums ===
- Ciao amore, come stai (1973)
- Riccardo Fogli (1976)
- Il sole, l'aria, la luce, il cielo (1977)
- Io ti porto via (1978)
- Che ne sai (1979)
- Alla fine di un lavoro (1980)
- Campione (1981)
- Collezione (1982)
- Compagnia (1982)
- Il primo Riccardo Fogli (Collection) (1982)
- Torna a sorridere (1984)
- 1985 (1985)
- Le infinite vie del cuore (1987)
- Storie di tutti i giorni (Collection) (1987)
- Amore di guerra (1988)
- Non finisce così (1989)
- Sentirsi uniti (1990)
- A metà del viaggio (1991)
- Canzoni d'amore (Collection) (1991)
- Teatrino meccanico (1992)
- Mondo (Collection) (1992)
- Nella fossa dei leoni (1994)
- Fogli su Fogli (Unplugged) (1995)
- Romanzo (1996)
- Greatest Hits (1997)
- Ballando (1998)
- Matteo (Recordings of 1976) (1999)
- Il mondo di Riccardo Fogli (Collection) (1999)
- Storie di tutti i giorni (Live) (2002)
- Il Vincitore – Musicfarm (2004)
- Storie d'amore (Anthology + 3 unreleased) (2004)
- Ci saranno giorni migliori (2005)
- Riccardo Fogli (Book + CD) (2008)
- Insieme (with Roby Facchinetti) (2017)

=== Singles ===
- "Zan zan" / "I 10 comandamenti dell'amore" (1970)
- "Due regali" / "Oh Mary" (1973)
- "Strana donna" / "La prima notte senza lei" (1973)
- "Complici" / "Strana donna" (1974)
- "Amico sei un gigante" / "Una volta di più" (1974)
- "Guardami" / "Gente per bene" (1975)
- "Mondo" / "Finito" (1976)
- "Ti voglio dire" / "Viaggio" (1976)
- "Stella" / "Anna ti ricordi" (1977)
- "Ricordati" / "Paola" (1977)
- "Io ti porto via" / "Si alza grande nel sole, la mia voglia di te" (1978)
- "Che ne sai" / "Come una volta" (1979)
- "Pace" / "Che amore vuoi che sia" (1979)
- "Ti amo però" / "È l'amore" (1980)
- "Scene da un amore" / "Angelina" (1980)
- "Malinconia" / "La strada" (1981)
- "Storie di tutti i giorni" / "L'amore che verrà" (1982)
- "Compagnia" / "Piccoli Tradimenti" (1982)
- "Per Lucia" / "Altri tempi" (1983)
- "Torna a sorridere" / "Diapositive" (1984)
- "Sulla buona strada" / "Greta" (1985)
- "Voglio sognare" / "Tempi andati" (1985)
- "Dio come vorrei" / "Buone vibrazioni" (1985)
- "Amore di guerra" (1988)
- "Non finisce così" / "Delicata" (1989)
- "Ma quale amore" / "È tempo per noi" (1990)
- "Io ti prego di ascoltare" / "A metà del viaggio" (1991)
- "In una notte così" / "Un'altra volta te" (1992)
- "Voglio le tue mani" / "Se il cuore non-contasse niente, uomini col borsello" (1992)
- "Storia di un'altra storia" (1993)
- "Quando sei sola" (1994)
- "Ci saranno giorni migliori" (2005)
- "Strade" (with Roby Facchinetti) (2017)
- "Le donne ci conoscono" (with Roby Facchinetti) (2017)
- "Il segreto del tempo" (with Roby Facchinetti) (2018)

Awards and achievements
Preceded by Alice with "Per Elisa"	Sanremo Music Festival; Winner; 1982	Succeeded by Tiziana Rivale with "Sarà quel che sarà"
Preceded by Alan Sorrenti with "Non so che darei"	Italy in the Eurovision Song Contest; 1983	Succeeded by Alice & Franco Battiato with "I treni di Tozeur"
