= Roby Facchinetti =

Italian musician (born 1944)

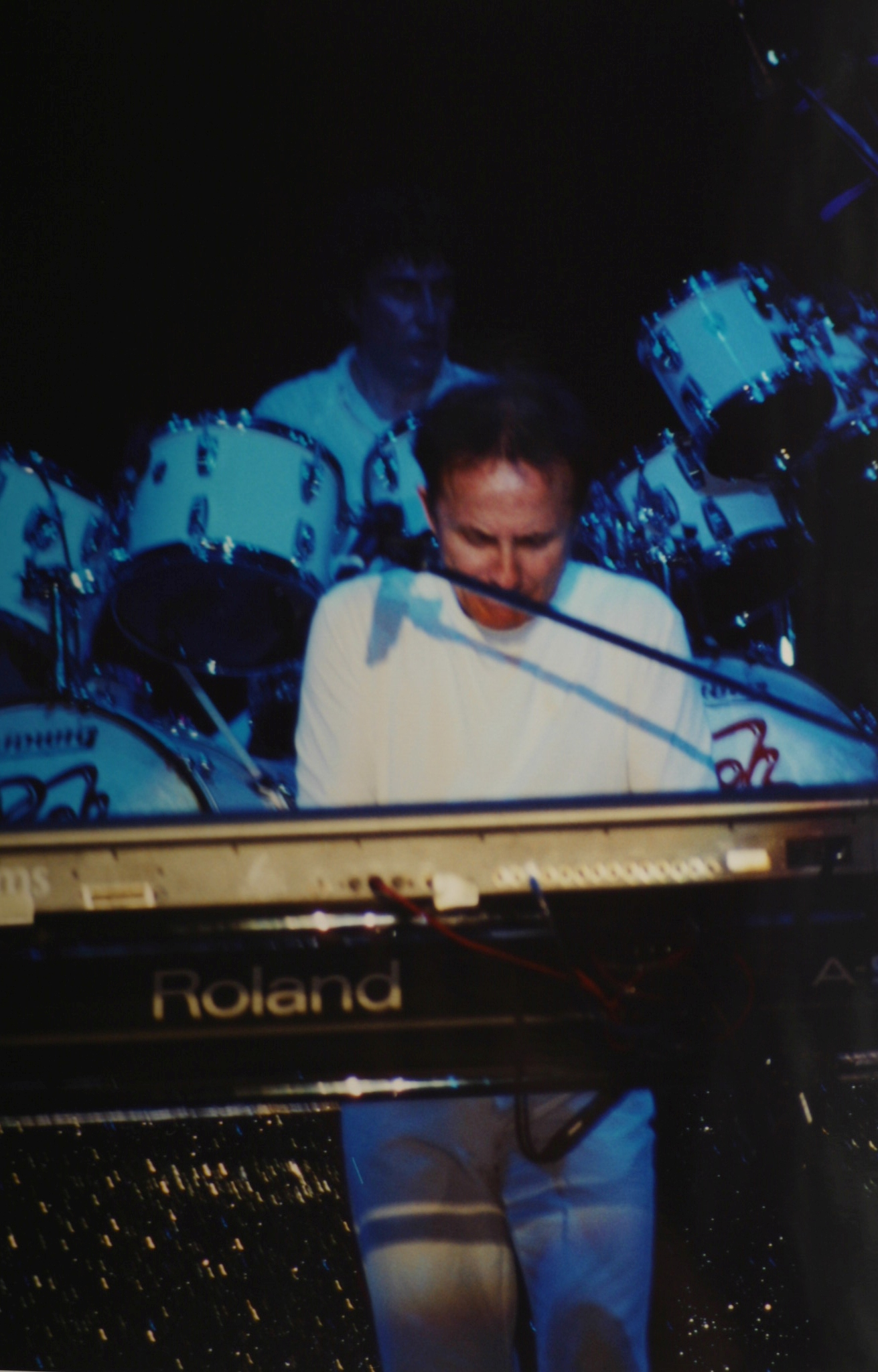
- Roby Facchinetti in 2004

Background information
- Born: Camillo Ferdinando Facchinetti; 1 May 1944 (age 82); Bergamo, Lombardy, Kingdom of Italy
- Genres: Classic; pop; pop rock
- Occupations: Singer; keyboardist
- Instrument: Keyboard
- Years active: 1958–present

Camillo Ferdinando "Roby" Facchinetti (born 1 May 1944) is an Italian musician, singer and keyboardist of the band Pooh.

== Life and career ==
Facchinetti was born in Bergamo, Lombardy. He was the Pooh's main songwriter, sharing this role with guitarist Dodi Battaglia starting from 1972 LP Alessandra. Facchinetti was a member of the band until their split up in 2016. He also published several solo albums.

He participated at the Sanremo Music Festival 2007 together with his son Francesco Facchinetti, and again at the 2018 edition with Riccardo Fogli.

His daughter is Alessandra Facchinetti. He considers himself Roman Catholic.

== Discography ==
Solo

- Roby Facchinetti (1984)
- Fai col cuore (1993)
- Ma che vita la mia (2014)
- Insieme (2017)
- Inseguendo la mia musica (2020)
- Parsifal: l'Uomo delle Stelle (2025)

Pooh
