= Sabrina Salerno discography =

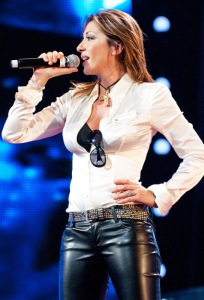
- Salerno performing in October 2010
- Studio albums: 6
- Compilation albums: 7
- Singles: 28

Italian singer, songwriter, model, actress and television presenter Sabrina Salerno has released six studio albums, seven compilation albums and 28 singles.

== Studio albums ==
List of studio albums, with selected chart positions
Title	Details	Peak chart positions				
Title	Details	AUS	FIN	FRA	SWE	SWI
Sabrina	Released: 1987; Label: Five Records (ITA); Formats: LP, CD, cassette	113	4	24	—	11
Super Sabrina	Released: 1988; Label: Videogram (ITA); Formats: LP, CD, cassette	—	10	—	39	28
Over the Pop	Released: 1991; Label: Casablanca (ITA); Formats: LP, CD, cassette	—	—	—	—	—
Maschio dove sei	Released: 1995; Label: NAR (ITA); Formats: CD, cassette	—	—	—	—	—
A Flower's Broken	Released: 1999; Label: RTI Music (ITA); Formats: CD, cassette	—	—	—	—	—
Erase/Rewind Official Remix	Released: 2008; Label: Edel Records (ITA); Formats: CD	—	—	—	—	—
"—" denotes a recording that did not chart or was not released in that territory.

== Compilation albums ==
List of compilation albums, with selected chart positions
Title	Details	Peak chart positions	
Title	Details	FIN	SWE
Something Special	Released: 1988; Label: Mega Records (DEN); Formats: LP, CD, cassette	13	31
Single Hits	Released: 1989; Label: Mega Records (DEN); Formats: LP, CD	—	—
Super Remix	Released: 1990; Label: Casablanca (ITA); Formats: LP, CD	—	—
Like a Yoyo	Released: 1992; Label: Karussell (GER); Formats: CD, cassette	—	—
The Very Best of Sabrina	Released: 1996; Label: Arcade (FRA); Formats: CD	—	—
Boys	Released: 2001; Label: Sony Music Media (FRA); Formats: CD	—	—
The Best	Released: 2005; Label: Танцевальный Рай (RUS); Formats: CD	—	—
"—" denotes a recording that did not chart or was not released in that territory.

== Singles ==
List of singles, with selected chart positions and certifications
Title	Year	Peak chart positions										Certifications	Album
Title	Year	ITA	AUS	BEL	FIN	FRA	GER	NLD	SWE	SWI	UK	Certifications	Album
"Sexy Girl"	1986	20	36	—	14	—	—	—	—	—	—		Sabrina
"Lady Marmalade"	1987	—	—	36	—	41	—	40	—	—	—		Sabrina
"Boys (Summertime Love)"	1987	5	11	2	2	1	2	4	5	1	3	BPI: Silver; BVMI: Gold; SNEP: Gold	Sabrina
"Hot Girl"	1987	21	—	6	6	12	19	10	—	13	—		Sabrina
"All of Me (Boy Oh Boy)"	1988	12	—	—	2	15	16	90	—	12	25		Super Sabrina
"My Chico"	1988	2	—	—	3	—	56	—	—	—	—		Super Sabrina
"Like a Yo-Yo"	1988	—	—	—	1	—	—	—	—	—	72		Super Sabrina
"Sex"	1989	—	—	—	—	—	—	—	—	—	—		Super Sabrina
"Guys and Dolls"	1989	—	—	—	—	—	—	—	—	—	—		Super Sabrina
"Pirate of Love"	1989	—	—	—	—	—	—	—	—	—	—		Super Sabrina
"Doctor's Orders"	1989	—	—	—	—	—	—	—	—	—	—		Super Sabrina
"Gringo"	1989	12	—	—	16	—	—	—	—	—	95		Super Remix
"Yeah Yeah"	1990	24	—	—	15	—	—	—	—	—	—		Over the Pop
"Siamo donne" (with Jo Squillo)	1991	21	—	—	—	—	—	—	—	—	—		Over the Pop
"Shadows of the Night"	1991	—	—	—	—	—	—	—	—	—	—		Over the Pop
"Cover Model"	1991	—	—	—	—	—	—	—	—	—	—		—N/a
"Rockawillie"	1994	—	—	—	—	—	—	—	—	—	—		—N/a
"Angel Boy"	1994	—	—	—	15	—	—	—	—	16	—		—N/a
"Boys '95"	1995	—	—	—	—	—	—	—	—	—	—		—N/a
"Fatta e rifatta"	1995	—	—	—	—	—	—	—	—	—	—		Maschio dove sei
"Maschio dove sei"	1995	—	—	—	—	—	—	—	—	—	—		Maschio dove sei
"Numeri"	1997	—	—	—	—	—	—	—	—	—	—		Numeri
"I Love You"	1999	—	—	—	—	—	—	—	—	—	—		A Flower's Broken
"Boys Boys Boys" (The Dance Remixes)	2003	—	—	—	—	—	—	—	—	—	—		—N/a
"I Feel Love (Good Sensation)"	2006	—	—	—	—	—	—	—	—	—	—		—N/a
"Erase/Rewind"	2008	—	—	—	—	—	—	—	—	—	—		Erase/Rewind Official Remix
"Call Me" (with Samantha Fox)	2010	—	—	—	—	—	—	—	—	—	—		—N/a
"Colour Me"	2014	—	—	—	—	—	—	—	—	—	—		—N/a
"Voices"	2018	—	—	—	—	—	—	—	—	—	—		—N/a
"Superstars" (with Eva Emaus)	2022	—	—	—	—	—	—	—	—	—	—		—N/a
"—" denotes a recording that did not chart or was not released in that territory.

== Guest appearances ==
List of non-single guest appearances
Title	Year	Other artist(s)	Album
"Amor mio"	2002	None	Emozioni
"E penso a te"	2002	Clotilde Sabatino	Emozioni
"La collina dei ciliegi"	2002	Vladimir Luxuria, Aldo Bergamaschi	Emozioni
"Shopping (I Like To)"	2013	Neon Neon	Praxis Makes Perfect
"I Love Rock 'n' Roll"	2017	None	Stars 80: L'album anniversarie!
