= Erase/Rewind Official Remix =

Studio album by Sabrina
- Released: 3 October 2008
- Recorded: 2008
- Genres: Pop; Italo disco; dance-pop; pop rock; synth-pop
- Labels: ZYX; Edel Music
- Producers: Andrea T. Mendoza; Steven Tibet

Sabrina chronology
A Flower's Broken (1999)	Erase/Rewind Official Remix (2008)

Singles from Erase/Rewind Official Remix
- 1. "Erase/Rewind" Released: 3 October 2008

Erase/Rewind Official Remix is the sixth and final studio album released by Italian singer Sabrina. It was released by ZYX Records and Edel Music on 3 October 2008. The two-disk package consists of a greatest hits album that includes new re-sung and remixed versions of her singles and two new covers – "Erase/Rewind" and "Born to Be Alive" – and a second CD of thirteen brand new pop/rock songs, which constitutes Sabrina's sixth studio album. The album was produced by Andrea T. Mendoza and Steven Tibet.

== Track listings ==
=== CD 1 ===
1. "All of Me (Boy Oh Boy)"
2. "Sexy Girl"
3. "Funky Girl"
4. "My Chico"
5. "Sex"
6. "Boys (Summertime Love)"
7. "Erase/Rewind"
8. "Hot Girl"
9. "Gringo"
10. "Born to Be Alive"
11. "Like a Yo-Yo"
12. "Angel Boy"
13. "I Love You"

=== CD 2 ===
1. "No Matter What You Say"
2. "Skin On Skin"
3. "Mama Said"
4. "Now Is The Time"
5. "Don't Want To Be Falling in Love"
6. "You Lie To Me"
7. "Maybe Your Love"
8. "Goodbye Baby"
9. "Yes"
10. "Stay A While"
11. "Shooting the Red Light"
12. "Brand New Way"
13. "Deep Water"
