= Something Special (Sabrina album) =

Compilation album by Sabrina
- Released: 1988
- Recorded: 1986–1988
- Genre: Pop, Italo disco
- Label: Mega Records
- Producer: Claudio Ceccetto; Stock Aitken Waterman; Elvio Moratto

Sabrina chronology
Sabrina (1987)	Something Special (1988)	Super Sabrina (1988)

Something Special is the first remix album by Italian singer Sabrina. It was released in 1988 for the Scandinavian market only.

== Album information ==
Mega Records of Copenhagen, Denmark released unique remix and/or compilation releases by several well-known pop/dance-artists in the late 1980s. After the releases of the singles "All of Me (Boy Oh Boy)" and "My Chico", but before the release of Sabrina's second studio album, Mega issued a compilation of remixes of Sabrina's songs issued until then. Several of these mixes are unique (Extended Versions of "My Sharona" and "Lady Marmalade"), while others are rare (The PWL-Remix of "My Chico"). The vinyl LP was released as a picture-disc in a gatefold-sleeve, accompanied by a poster, and the CD featured six bonus-tracks.

== Track listings ==
1. "Multimegamix" 6:47
2. "My Chico" (PWL Mix)
3. "Boys (Summertime Love)" (Extended Mix)
4. "Hot Girl" (Dub Version)
5. "Lady Marmalade" (12" Remix)
6. "All of Me (Boy Oh Boy)" (PWL Mix)
7. "The Sexy Girl Mix for Boys and Hot Girls"
8. "My Sharona" (Extended Mix)
9. "My Chico"
10. "All of Me (Boy Oh Boy)" (Extended Mix)
11. "Hot Girl"
12. "Boys (Summertime Love)" (Dub Mix)
13. "Sexy Girl"
14. "My Chico" (Dub House Mix)

== Charts ==
Chart (1988)	Peak position
Finnish Albums (Suomen virallinen lista)	13
Swedish Albums (Sverigetopplistan)	31
