= Super Remix =

Remix album by Sabrina
- Released: 1990
- Recorded: 1986–1990
- Genre: Pop, Italo disco
- Label: Casablanca Records
- Producer: Stock Aitken Waterman; Giampiero Menzione; Elvio Moratto; Claudio Cecchetto; Gianfranco Bortolotti

Sabrina chronology
Super Sabrina (1988)	Super Remix (1990)	Over the Pop (1991)

Super Remix is the second remix album by Italian singer Sabrina. It was released in 1990 in Italy only.

== Album information ==
In 1990, Casablanca Records in Italy issued a unique compilation of remixes in the form of the very rare "Super Remix" album. Among the album's 8 tracks is a unique remix of "Sex", while the other remixes are available on other releases, too. The remix of "Sex" is the guitar-driven version Sabrina mimed to on several TV shows in 1989/1990. A version of "Gringo" (the 5:00 Extended Remix) is also featured, making the Super Remix album the only album to contain this track.

== Track listings ==
1. "The Sexy Girl Mix for Boys & Hot Girls" – 6:39
2. "Doctor's Orders" (Extended Remix) – 5:02
3. "My Chico" (PWL Mix) – 6:10
4. "Sex" (Remix) – 3:58
5. "Like a Yo-Yo" (PWL Mix) – 6:30
6. "Guys And Dolls" (Extended Remix) – 5:06
7. "All of Me (Boy Oh Boy)" (PWL Remix) – 6:00
8. "Gringo" (Extended Remix) – 5:00
