= Perché lo fai =

1991 single by Marco Masini

Single by Marco Masini

from the album Malinconoia
- Released: 1991
- Length: 4:41
- Label: Dischi Ricordi
- Songwriters: Giancarlo Bigazzi; Mario Manzani; Marco Masini

Marco Masini singles chronology
"Ci vorrebbe il mare" (1990)	"Perché lo fai" (1991)	"Ti vorrei" (1991)

Audio
- "Perché lo fai" on YouTube

"Perché lo fai" ('Why do you do it') is a 1991 Italian song by Marco Masini, composed by Masini, Giancarlo Bigazzi and Mario Manzani. It is the leading single of Masini's album Malinconoia.

== Production ==
The song was initially composed in 1989 by Giancarlo Bigazzi and Mario Manzani as "Un adagio per dirti addio", and was originally intended to be Umberto Tozzi's entry at the Sanremo Music Festival 1990, before Tozzi eventually changed his mind and decided to not take part in the festival.

At the Sanremo Music Festival 1991, Marco Masini was automatically qualified for the main competition after winning the 1990 Newcomers' competition with "Disperato", and his producer Bigazzi suggested to use the same melody; the song, which originally told the story of a painful breakup, was totally rewritten in collaboration with the same Masini, and turned into a manifesto against the use of hard drugs. The song eventually placed third at the festival, following Riccardo Cocciante's "Se stiamo insieme" and Renato Zero's "Spalle al muro".

== Reception ==
Upon its debut, the song was generally poorly received by critics, who criticized its lack of poetry and described it as exhibiting "an almost smug desperation". It was a commercial success, and the most sold single among the songs presented at the 1991 Festival.

== Other versions ==
At the festival, Dee Dee Bridgewater presented an English-language version of the song titled "Tell Me Why". Masini recorded the song in Spanish, with the title "Por Qué Lo Háras". In 1993, Nancy Martinez released a French cover of the song, "Pourquoi Tu Pars". In 2006, Masini and Umberto Tozzi recorded it in a duet for their collaboration album Tozzi/Masini.

== Track listing ==
No.	Title	Writer(s)	Length
1.	"Perché lo fai"	Masini, Bigazzi, Manzani	4:41
2.	"Il giorno dei perdenti"	Giuseppe Dati, Masini, Bigazzi, Manzani	4:05

== Charts ==
Chart (1991)	Peak position
Italy (Music & Media)	1
Italy (Musica e dischi)	1
