= Fratelli d'Italia (disambiguation) =

The phrase Fratelli d'Italia (Brothers of Italy) can refer to:

- "Fratelli d'Italia", unofficial and informal name indicating Il Canto degli Italiani, the national anthem of Italy
- Brothers of Italy, an Italian political party
- Fratelli d'Italia (1989 film), an Italian comedy film
- Fratelli d'Italia (1952 film), an Italian biographical war film
