= Angel Boy =

Single by Sabrina
- Released: January 17, 1995
- Recorded: 1994/1995
- Genre: Eurodance, italo dance
- Length: 3:18
- Label: ZYX Music
- Songwriters: Sabrina, C. Cowatsch, N. Dyer, Sergio Portaluri
- Producers: Enrico Monti; Fulvio Zafret; Sergio Portaluri

Sabrina singles chronology
"Boys '95" (1995)	"Angel Boy" (1995)	"Fatta e Rifatta" (1996)

Audio video
- "Angel Boy (Radio Edit)" on YouTube

"Angel Boy" is a song by Italian singer Sabrina. The song was produced by Enrico Monti, Fulvio Zafret and Sergio Portaluri. It was released in 1995 as a non-album single.

== Background and release ==
After Sabrina's comeback with "Rockawillie", she quickly moved onwards to releasing another new single: "Angel Boy", a song very much in the format of the then-current "Euro"-style of dance-music, which meant – most of all – that a song had to feature a famous rapper, Tony Dyer. Once again produced by Enrico Monti, four mixes of the song were prepared. Strangely, on most TV-shows, Sabrina did not mime to the "Short Edit", but to one of the longer remixes (in most cases, the "Angel Mix"), including on Spanish TV show "En Casa Con Raffaella". This single marked the end of her contract with her manager.

Although all record companies used more or less the same standard design for the picture-sleeves and the same mixes on their releases, there are some variations in details. The German CD single – released on the ZYX dance-label – bordered Sabrina's futuristic picture with smaller versions of that same picture, while the German 12" did not even have a picture-sleeve at all. The Italian CD single does not only feature the four mixes of "Angel Boy", but also one mix of "Rockawillie". In France, a new format had developed at the beginning of the 1990s, the 2-track-CD single. Consequently, the French label Atoll Music released "Angel Boy" in this format.

The song reached No. 15 on the Finnish Singles Chart. However, in France, the single failed the chart.

== Formats and track listings ==
CD Single

1. "Angel Boy" (Short Edit) – 3:18
2. "Angel Boy" (Control Mix) – 5:27
3. "Angel Boy" (Extended Mix) – 5:40
4. "Angel Boy" (Angel Mix) – 5:12

12" Single

1. "Angel Boy" (Control Mix) – 5:27
2. "Angel Boy" (Extended Mix) – 5:40
3. "Angel Boy" (Angel Mix) – 5:12
4. "Angel Boy" (Short Edit) – 3:18

== Charts ==
Chart performance for "Angel Boy"
Chart (1995)	Peak position
Finland (Suomen virallinen lista)	15
