= Sanremo Music Festival 1991 =

Italian song contest (41st edition)

Dates and venue
- Semi-final 1: 27 February 1991
- Semi-final 2: 28 February 1991
- Semi-final 3: 1 March 1991
- Final: 2 March 1991
- Venue: Teatro Ariston; Sanremo, Italy

Organisation
- Broadcaster: Radiotelevisione italiana (RAI)
- Artistic director: Adriano Aragozzini
- Presenters: Andrea Occhipinti and Edwige Fenech

Big Artists section
- Number of entries: 20
- Winner: "Se stiamo insieme" Riccardo Cocciante

Newcomers' section
- Number of entries: 16
- Winner: "Le persone inutili" Paolo Vallesi

The Sanremo Music Festival 1991 (Italian: Festival di Sanremo 1991), officially the 41st Italian Song Festival (41º Festival della canzone italiana), was the 41st annual Sanremo Music Festival, held at the Teatro Ariston in Sanremo between 27 February and 2 March 1991 and broadcast by Radiotelevisione italiana (RAI). The show was presented by actors Andrea Occhipinti and Edwige Fenech. Adriano Aragozzini served as artistic director.

According to the rules of this edition, each song of the Big Artists section was presented in a double performance by a non-Italian singer or group, and adapted in their foreign language. The winner of the Big Artists section was Riccardo Cocciante with the song "Se stiamo insieme", while Enzo Jannacci won the critics award with the song "La fotografia". Paolo Vallesi won the "Newcomers" section with the song "Le persone inutili".

== Participants and results ==
=== Headline acts ===
Big Artists section
Song	Artist(s)	Songwriter(s)	Foreign version	Foreign artist(s)	Rank
"Se stiamo insieme"	Riccardo Cocciante	Riccardo Cocciante, Mogol	"I'm Missing You"	Sarah Jane Morris	1
"Spalle al muro"	Renato Zero	Mariella Nava	"Still Life"	Grace Jones	2
"Perché lo fai"	Marco Masini	Giancarlo Bigazzi, Mario Manzani, Marco Masini	"Just Tell Me Why"	Dee Dee Bridgewater	3
"Gli altri siamo noi"	Umberto Tozzi	Umberto Tozzi, Giancarlo Bigazzi	"Other People Are Us"	Howard Jones	4
"Spunta la Luna dal monte"	Pierangelo Bertoli ft. Tazenda	Luigi Marielli, Pierangelo Bertoli	"Y ya viene amanenciendo"	Moncada	5
"Nené"	Amedeo Minghi	Amedeo Minghi	"Endless Night"	Bonnie Tyler	6
"Dubbi no"	Mietta	Amedeo Minghi	"All Alone"	Leo Sayer	7
"Oggi sposi"	Al Bano and Romina Power	Depsa, Giuseppe Andretto	"Just Married"	Tyrone Power, Jr.	8
"Io ti prego di ascoltare"	Riccardo Fogli	Guido Morra, Maurizio Fabrizio	"Listen to Me"	Sold Out	9
"Oggi un Dio non ho"	Raf	Raffele Riefoli, Giuseppe Dati	"Today I'll Pray"	Ofra Haza	10
"La fotografia"	Enzo Jannacci	Enzo Jannacci	"Photograph"	Ute Lemper	11 / Critics Award
"Il mare più grande che c'è (I love you man)"	Fiordaliso	Franco Ciani, Fio Zanotti	"Don't Walk Away"	Laura Branigan	12
"Siamo donne"	Sabrina Salerno & Jo Squillo	Giovanna Coletti	"Part Time Lovers"	Shannon	13
"Sbatti ben su del Be Bop"	Ladri di Biciclette	Paolo Belli, Enrico Prandi	"Lemme Hear Some o' That Be-Bop"	Jon Hendricks	14
"E la musica va"	Eduardo De Crescenzo	Eduardo De Crescenzo, Franco Del Prete	"And the Beat Goes On"	Phil Manzanera	15
"Se io fossi un uomo"	Grazia Di Michele	Joanna, Grazia Di Michele, Peppi Nocera	"If I Were in Your Shoes"	Randy Crawford	16
"Terra"	Rossana Casale	Guido Morra, Maurizio Fabrizio	"You're in My Mind"	Carmel	17
"In questa città"	Loredana Bertè	Pino Daniele	"All That We Are"	Harriet	18
"La fila degli oleandri"	Gianni Bella	Gianni Bella, Mogol	"Together We Can"	Gloria Gaynor	19
"Gli uomini"	Mariella Nava	Mariella Nava	"Coming Home"	Caron Wheeler	20

=== Newcomers ===
Newcomers section
Song	Artist(s)	Songwriter(s)	Rank
"Le persone inutili"	Paolo Vallesi	Giuseppe Dati; Paolo Vallesi	1
"La donna di Ibsen"	Irene Fargo	Enzo Miceli; Gaetano Lorefice	2
"È soltanto una canzone"	Rita Forte	Elio Palumbo; Alberto Cheli	3
"Che grossa nostalgia"	Fandango	Lilia Fiori	Finalist
"Donne del 2000"	Compilations	Adelmo Musso; Valentino Perraccino; A. Giraldi; S. Rosolino	Finalist
"E noi qui"	Bungaro, Marco Conidi & Rosario Di Bella	Bungaro; Marco Conidi; Rosario Di Bella	Finalist
"Giselle"	Patrizia Bulgari	Gianni Ciarella	Finalist
"Serenata"	Marco Carena	Marco Carena	Finalist
"Tamuré"	Gitano	Dora Famiglietti; Gitano	Finalist
"Notte di periferia"	Paola De Mas	Alberto Salerno; Mauro Paoluzzi	Finalist
"Caramba"	Stefania La Fauci	Chelinse	Eliminated
"Gaetano"	Rudy Marra	Rudy Marra; Attilio Pace; Mauro Spina	Eliminated / Critics Award
"Il lazzo"	Gianni Mazza	Gianni Mazza	Eliminated
"L'uomo che ride"	Timoria	Omar Pedrini	Eliminated / Critics Award
"Non è poesia"	Giovanni Nuti	Paolo Recalcati; Giovanni Nuti	Eliminated
"Sorelle d'Italia"	Dario Gai	Dario Gai	Eliminated

== Broadcasts ==
=== Local broadcasts ===
All shows were broadcast on Rai Uno.

=== International broadcasts ===
Known details on the broadcasts in each country, including the specific broadcasting stations and commentators are shown in the tables below.

International broadcasters of the Sanremo Music Festival 1991
Country	Broadcaster	Channel(s)	Commentator(s)	Ref(s)
United States	KTSF (Note: Delayed broadcast on 3 March at 15:00 (PDT))			
United States	WNYC-TV (Note: Delayed broadcast on 27 March at 14:00 (EDT))			
Yugoslavia	JRT	TV Belgrade 2, TV Novi Sad		
Yugoslavia	JRT	HTV 2		
