= Nancy Martinez =

Canadian singer

- Also known as: Nancy Martin, Jade
- Born: Nancy Catherine Julia Martinez; August 26, 1960 (age 66); Montreal, Quebec, Canada
- Origin: Quebec, Canada
- Genres: Dance-pop, Hi-NRG, freestyle
- Occupation: Singer
- Instrument: Vocals
- Years active: 1977–present
- Labels: Atlantic (US, Canada); Neige (Canada)

Nancy Martinez (born August 26, 1960) is a Canadian dance-pop singer and musician who is primarily known for her 1986 hits "For Tonight" and "Move Out".

== Early life ==
Nancy Martinez grew up in the Rosemount neighbourhood of Montreal, Quebec to a Spaniard father and mother of Welsh and English descent. She studied piano as a child.

During 1980-81 she toured with Quebec recording artist Chatelaine ("Take Me") as well as touring and doing studio work with René Simard and Nathalie Simard, disco sensation Kat Mandu ("The Break"), and others.

== Career ==
She released four Hi-NRG tracks between 1982 and 1983: "I'm Gonna Get Your Love" and "Who Cares" (both credited as Jade) and "Can't Believe" and "Hold Your Horses Baby" (both credited as Nancy Martin). She then released her debut album (Lay It Down) on Matra Records, which included the singles "So Excited" and "Take It Slowly".

Two non-album singles were released in 1984: "Sunshine Reggae / La Vie En Rose" and "Number Two In Love".

In 1986, she released the album Not Just the Girl Next Door on Atlantic Records in New York City. That album and its unique blend of French-Canadian and Latino sensibilities produced three dance hits: "For Tonight" which went to number two for two weeks on the dance charts, "Move Out" which got to #12, and "Crazy Love". "For Tonight" also crossed over to the Billboard Hot 100 chart, peaking at #32.

1987 saw the release of the single "Can't Wait". This song is not on any Nancy Martinez album, but the single peaked at #11 on the dance charts, and is on the compilation CD "Greatest Freestyle Album In The Universe, Vol. 3". She was also nominated as Most Promising Female Vocalist at the 1987 Juno Awards.

In 1989, she released her album Unpredictable. Singles from this album didn't make the impact that prior ones did, but "Save Your Love For Me" was played on dance radio, as was follow up song "You've Got Me On Fire".

In 1990, she released her self-titled French album on the Isba/CBS Label, which produced three top ten singles.

In 1993, Nancy released a French album on Isba Music/ CBS Records entitled Pourquoi Tu Pars? featuring the title track, a cover of Italian singer songwriter Marco Masini's "Perché lo fai". As well as "La Maitresse de tes reves" whose video received much airplay on Musique Plus (Much Music's sister station in Quebec). In 2006, Martinez collaborated with MC Mario and Ivan Pavlin on the song "Not Guilty".

In 2005 Martinez recorded "Downtown" a collection of Jazz Standards.

Martinez also was featured on Kmaro's "Femme Like You" with Manon Godbout and "Crazy".

In 2010, "For Tonight" was remixed by MC Mario & Vito V from Les Boyz Electro and appeared on his album Mixdown 2010, peaking #2 on his show and #9 in Canada.

== Discography ==
=== Albums ===
- Lay It Down (1983)
- Not Just the Girl Next Door (1986)
- Unpredictable (1989)
- Nancy Martinez (1990)
- Pourquoi Tu Pars? (1993)
- La Maîtresse De Tes Rêves (1996)
- Bird's in the House (1998)
- Downtown (2004)

=== Singles ===
- "I'm Gonna Get Your Love" (1982)
- "Can't Believe" (1982)
- "Who Cares" (1983)
- "Hold Your Horses Baby" (1983)
- "So Excited" (1983)
- "Take It Slowly" (1983)
- "Sunshine Reggae / La Vie En Rose" (1984)
- "Number Two In Love" (1984)
- "For Tonight" (1986)
- "Move Out" (1987)
- "Crazy Love" (1987)
- "Can't Wait" (1987)
- "You've Got Me On Fire" (1989)
- "Save Your Love For Me" (1989)
- "Everlasting" (1990)
- "Mon Homme" (1992)
- "La Maîtresse De Tes Rêves" (1993)
- "I'm In Heat" (1998)
- "Jack" (1998)
- "Fire" (1998)
- "For The First Time" (2000)
- "Femme Like U (Donne-moi ton corps)" (2004)
- "Crazy" (2004)
- "Laisse-Moi Te Donner" (2005)
- "Not Guilty" (2006)
