= Super Sabrina =

Studio album by Sabrina
- Released: 31 October 1988
- Recorded: 1987–1988
- Genres: Pop; italo disco
- Length: 40:08 (CD version); 35:39 (vinyl version)
- Label: Videogram
- Producers: Stock Aitken Waterman; Giampiero Menzione; Elvio Moratto

Sabrina chronology
Something Special (1988)	Super Sabrina (1988)	Super Remix (1990)

Singles from Super Sabrina
- 1. "All of Me" Released: July 1988; 2. "My Chico" Released: October 1988; 3. "Like a Yo-Yo" Released: February 1989

Super Sabrina is the second studio album by the Italian pop singer Sabrina, released on 31 October 1988 by Videogram.

== Album information ==
1988 saw the release of Sabrina's second studio album, titled Super Sabrina, in Italy, France and Denmark; and in 1989 in other countries. The standard format at the time was still the vinyl LP, with Italy adding a bonus in the form of a picture disc (using the same picture as the standard LP). While all countries used the same picture-sleeve design, the track listings were quite different. Italy and Germany added "Boys (Summertime Love)" and "Sexy Girl" to the eight tracks especially produced for the LP. Denmark released only these eight tracks, while the French CD release couples the eight tracks with the 'Extended Mix' of "My Chico" and the 'Boy Oh Boy Remix' of "All of Me (Boy Oh Boy)". Most interesting is the Japanese CD, which contains several rare remixes, including the 5:03 version of "Doctor's Orders".

== Singles ==
Five singles were released from the album: "All of Me (Boy Oh Boy)", "My Chico", "Like a Yo-Yo", "Sex" and "Guys and Dolls". "All of Me (Boy oh Boy)" was written and produced by the English trio Stock Aitken Waterman. Entering the charts in mid-summer 1988, the single became Sabrina's third major European hit. The second single "My Chico" reached No. 1 in Italy and No. 3 in Finland. The third single "Like a Yo-Yo" had success in Finland where it peaked at No. 1.

== Track listing ==
Super Sabrina – Digital edition track listing
No.	Title	Writer(s)	Length
1.	"Like a Yo-Yo"	Giorgio Moroder	3:28
2.	"All of Me (Boy Oh Boy)"	Stock Aitken Waterman	3:48
3.	"Doctor's Orders"	Roger Cook; Roger Greenaway; Geoff Stephens	3:18
4.	"Funky Girl"	Mario Fuliano	3:49
5.	"My Chico"	Sabrina Salerno; Orlando Johnson; Elvio Moratto	3:39
6.	"Pirate of Love"	Moroder	4:00
7.	"Guys and Dolls"	Salerno; Maurizio Baldassarre; Ivano Baldassarre	3:50
8.	"Sex"	Enrico Pannuto; Massimo Zucchelli; Angelo La Bionda	4:10
Total length:			29:03

Super Sabrina – CD physical edition bonus tracks
No.	Title	Writer(s)	Length
9.	"All of Me (Boy Oh Boy) (Boy Oh Boy Mix)"	Stock Aitken Waterman	6:02
10.	"My Chico (Extended version)"	Salerno; Johnson; Moratto	5:23
Total length:			40:08

Super Sabrina – LP physical edition track listing
No.	Title	Writer(s)	Length
1.	"Like a Yo-Yo"	Moroder	3:28
2.	"All of Me (Boy Oh Boy)"	Stock Aitken Waterman	3:48
3.	"Doctor's Orders"	Cook; Greenaway; Stephens	3:18
4.	"Boys (Summertime Love)"	Matteo Bonsanto; Roberto Rossi; Claudio Cecchetto; Malcolm Charlton	3:55
5.	"Funky Girl"	Mario Fuliano	3:49
6.	"My Chico"	Salerno; Johnson; Moratto	3:39
7.	"Pirate of Love"	Moroder	4:00
8.	"Sexy Girl"	Bonsanto; Rossi; Naimy Ruth Hackett	3:25
9.	"Guys and Dolls"	Salerno; M. Baldassarre; I. Baldassarre	3:50
10.	"Sex"	Pannuto; Zucchelli; La Bionda	4:10
Total length:			35:39

== Charts ==
Chart (1988–89)	Peak position
Finnish Albums (Suomen virallinen lista)	10
Swedish Albums (Sverigetopplistan)	39
Swiss Albums (Schweizer Hitparade)	28
