= Not Just the Girl Next Door =

Studio album by Nancy Martinez
- Released: 1986
- Genre: Dance-pop, freestyle
- Length: 33:06
- Label: Atlantic
- Producer: Teneen Ali

Nancy Martinez chronology
Lay It Down (1983)	Not Just the Girl Next Door (1986)	Unpredictable (1989)

Singles from Not Just the Girl Next Door
- 1. "For Tonight" Released: 1986; 2. "Move Out" Released: 1986; 3. "Crazy Love" Released: 1987

Not Just the Girl Next Door is the second studio album by Canadian singer Nancy Martinez, released in 1986 by Atlantic Records.

The album's lead single, "For Tonight", reached number 32 on the US Billboard Hot 100 and number two on the Dance Club Songs chart. The follow-up single, "Move Out", reached number 12 on the Dance Club Play chart.

== Critical reception ==
Professional ratings
Review scores
Source	Rating
AllMusic	4/5 stars

The Globe and Mail wrote that "nothing scintillates here, but the songs burble and pop in a series of pleasant grooves."

AllMusic deemed Not Just the Girl Next Door "one of the best Latin freestyle-oriented albums of the 1980s."

== Track listing ==
No.	Title	Writer(s)	Length
1.	"For Tonight"	Phil George, Donna Pacifici
2.	"Move Out"	Richard Dubuc, Dino Pacifici, Donna Pacifici
3.	"It Happens All the Time"	Richard Dubuc, Theodore Robinson
4.	"I'll Be There"	D. Landon, L. Archambault
5.	"In the Heat of the Night"	Phil George
6.	"Hurt Me Twice (Shame on You)"	Rusty Cutchin
7.	"Crazy Love"	Steven Tracey, Glenn Meland
8.	"Without Love"	Rusty Cutchin
9.	"Rhythm of Your Heart"	Steven Tracey, Glenn Meland

== Chart performance ==
=== Album ===
Chart (1987)	Peak position
US (Billboard 200)	178

=== Singles ===
Year	Single	Chart	Position
1986	"For Tonight"	Billboard (US) Hot 100	32
1986	"For Tonight"	Billboard (US) Hot Dance/Club Play	2
1987	"Move Out"	Billboard (US) Hot Dance/Club Play	12
