= Over the Pop =

Studio album by Sabrina
- Released: 1991
- Recorded: 1990–1991
- Genre: Pop; dance-pop; pop rock
- Label: Casablanca
- Producer: Sabrina Salerno; Elvio Moratto; Giorgio Moroder; Mauro Paoluzzi; Silvio Testi; Vittorio De Scalzi

Sabrina chronology
| Super Remix (1990) | Over the Pop (1991) | Maschio dove sei (1996) |

Singles from Over the Pop
- 1. "Yeah Yeah" Released: March 1990; 2. "Siamo donne" Released: January 1991; 3. "Shadows of the Night" Released: 29 June 1991

Professional ratings
Review scores
| Source | Rating |
|---|---|
| Music & Media | (favorable) |

Over the Pop is the third studio album by Italian singer Sabrina. It was released in 1991 through Casablanca Records.

== Background and development ==
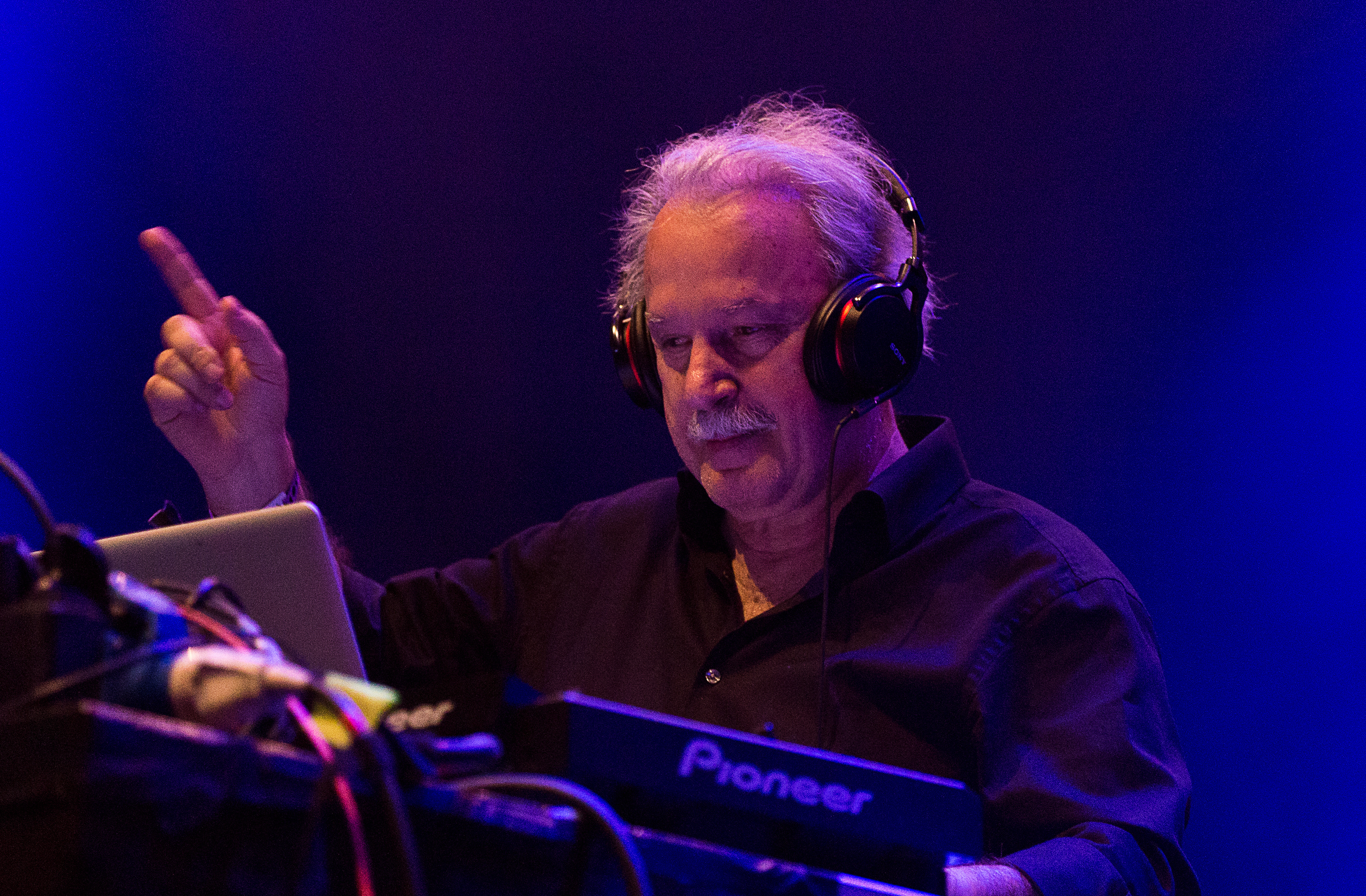
Giorgio Moroder (pictured in 2015) wrote and produced two songs for Over the Pop.

In 1990, Sabrina was the hostess of the daily morning TV show Ricomincio da 2 with Raffaella Carrà on Rai Due, and appeared on the popular music show Festivalbar with a new single called "Yeah Yeah". 1991 marked a turning point in Sabrina's career: she performed a duet with Italian singer Jo Squillo in singing "Siamo donne", her first release in the Italian language. They performed together at 1991's Sanremo Music Festival to much acclaim.

Sabrina's third studio album, Over the Pop, was released that same year, and for the first time she was allowed to co-write and produce some of the songs. It was clear that Sabrina's will to mature as an artist were emerging, and this desire for independence led to conflict with her management. As a result, the album promotion was interrupted and only one more single, "Shadows of the Night", was released from the album.

A picture disc edition of Over the Pop was released later in 1991, now including "Siamo Donne'". Also on this version of the album an album version of "Yeah Yeah", was replaced by the remix version of this song. The album's artwork was shot during her shooting for her music video "All of Me (Boy Oh Boy)"'s Italian version in 1988.

== Promotion and reception ==
"Yeah Yeah" was released as the first single from Sabrina's third album Over the Pop. The song reached No. 24 in Italy. Then, "Siamo donne" was released in January 1991 and was available only on a picture disc edition; it was Sabrina's first duet and her first release in the Italian language. This song reached No. 11 in Italy. The third single, "Shadows of the Night" was released on 29 June 1991 in Italy only. Originally written and produced by Giorgio Moroder, Videogram had the track remixed for the single release. The new version is a much dancier affair than the mid-tempo original. The B-side features a unique remix of "Siamo donne", with Sabrina doing the vocals all by herself. Two formats were issued: A standard 12" and a 12"-picture-disc (which proved to be Sabrina's last picture-disc release until 2010).

Pan-European magazine Music & Media wrote, "Summer will be summer again, with a new swimming pool full of hits. Dirty Boy Look shows the Italian teaser at her most sensual. Session musicians include saxophone player R. Ravenscroft (of Gerry Rafferty fame), who blows a solo on the single Yeah Yeah. Biggest surprise, however, is the cover version of the Carpenters' classic Yesterday Once More."

== Track listing ==
Over the Pop – Standard edition
| No. | Title | Writer(s) | Producer(s) | Length |
|---|---|---|---|---|
| 1. | "Yeah Yeah" | Sabrina Salerno; David Sion; Sergio Portaluri | Salerno; Elvio Moratto | 3:54 |
| 2. | "Vola" | Silvio Testi; Marco Salvati; Peppe Vessicchio | Testi | 3:25 |
| 3. | "Dirty Boy Look" | Hal Lindes; Bruce Woolley | Moratto | 4:30 |
| 4. | "With a Boy Like You" | Reg Presley | Mauro Paoluzzi | 4:30 |
| 5. | "Yesterday Once More" | Richard Carpenter; John Bettis | Vittorio De Scalzi; Moratto | 4:16 |
| 6. | "Shadows of the Night" | Giorgio Moroder; Tom Whitlock | Moroder | 4:56 |
| 7. | "Afraid to Love" | Salerno; Alberto Carpani | Salerno; Moratto | 4:44 |
| 8. | "Promises in the Dark" | Pamela Phillips Oland; Johnny Warman | Salerno; Moratto | 4:06 |
| 9. | "You Can Get It If You Really Want" | Jimmy Cliff | Paoluzzi | 4:15 |
| 10. | "Love Dream" | Salerno; Sion; Moratto | Salerno; Moratto | 4:31 |
| 11. | "Domination" | Salerno; Moratto; Sion | Salerno; Moratto | 4:12 |
| 12. | "Love Is Like Magic" | Moroder; Whitlock | Moroder | 4:50 |

Over the Pop – Expanded edition bonus tracks
| No. | Title | Writer(s) | Producer(s) | Length |
|---|---|---|---|---|
| 1. | "Siamo donne" (with Jo Squillo) | Giovanna Coletti | Gianni Muciaccia | 7:16 |
| 8. | "Yeah Yeah" (remix) | Salerno; Salerno; Portaluri | Salerno; Moratto | 4:20 |
| 14. | "Yeah Yeah" (acappella) | Salerno; Sion; Portaluri | Salerno; Moratto | 1:30 |
