= Sarah Jane Morris (singer) =

British singer

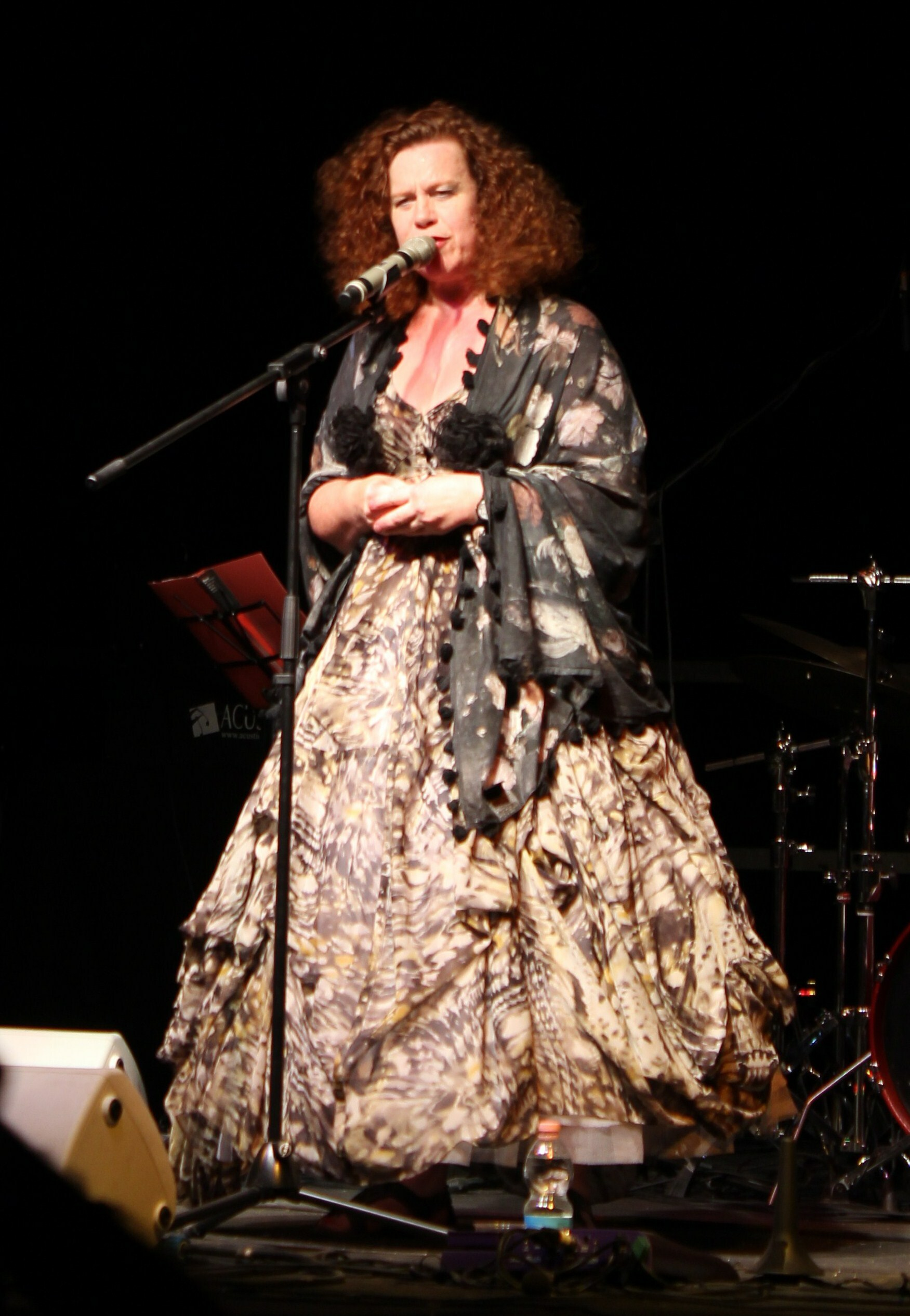
- Morris in 2011

Background information
- Born: 21 March 1959 (age 67); Southampton, England
- Occupations: Singer, songwriter
- Years active: 1980s–present
- Website: sarahjanemorris.co.uk

Sarah Jane Morris (born 21 March 1959) is a British singer of pop, jazz, rock and R&B and a songwriter from Southampton, England.

== Biography ==
In 1982, Morris joined The Republic as lead singer. A London-based Afro-Caribbean-Latin band, they received enormous publicity from the music press including cover stories with NME and City Limits and a documentary for Granada TV. But the band was deemed too political for radio play, with the exception of Capital Radio. The Republic were signed to Charlie Gillett's Oval Records Ltd and released an EP entitled Three Songs From The Republic and two singles entitled "One Chance" and "My Spies". Success did not follow and the band split up in 1984.

Morris then sang with The Happy End, a 21-piece brass band named after Bertolt Brecht, Elisabeth Hauptmann and Kurt Weill's musical play. Playing a circuit that included Brighton's Zap Club and the Edinburgh Festival Fringe, The Happy End explored protest music from Africa, Ireland and Latin America in a way that emulated Charlie Haden's Liberation Music Orchestra.

Morris explored her more theatrical side on Brecht/Eisler's There's Nothing Quite Like Money and Brecht/Weill's Pirate Jenny from The Threepenny Opera.

The Happy End released two albums on the Cooking Vinyl label with Morris. Following a successful Edinburgh run in 1986, Morris then decamped to chart success with The Communards.

Morris found fame initially with The Communards, who are best known for their hit "Don't Leave Me This Way". Morris featured prominently on many Communards tracks, her deep vocal range contrasting with Jimmy Somerville's falsetto. Actually Jimmy himself describes his voice as "counter tenor". Source: BBC interview on YouTube. BBC Breakfast 2015

Morris also contributed to the opera The Fall of the House of Usher (1991) by Peter Hammill and Judge Smith, singing the part of the chorus. She also sang the part of Mère Ubu on the Pere Ubu album Long Live Père Ubu! (2009), which features songs from Bring Me The Head of Pere Ubu, David Thomas's theatrical adaptation of Alfred Jarry's Ubu Roi.

She recorded an album of John Martyn covers with guitarist Tony Rémy in 2019 entitled Sweet Little Mystery and is touring with him playing the songs from the album.

She is a cousin of American author Armistead Maupin.

=== In Italy ===
Morris has also recorded as a solo artist, releasing albums since 1989. These have enjoyed most popularity in Italy and Greece.

She has performed at the Sanremo Music Festival several times: at the 1991 festival, her duet with Riccardo Cocciante of the song Se stiamo insieme won the "Big Artists" section.

== Album discography ==
with The Happy End

- There's Nothing Quite Like Money (1985)
- Resolution (1987)

with The Jazz Renegades

- Freedom Samba (1989) (vocals on "Do it the Hard Way")
- Freedom Principle – Acid Jazz and Other Illicit Grooves Vol. 2 by various artists (1989) (vocals on "Mother of the Future")

with Pere Ubu

Long Live Père Ubu! (2009)

solo

- Sarah Jane Morris (1989) – 100,000 copies sold
- Heaven (1992)
- Blue Valentine (1995) – live at Ronnie Scott's
- Fallen Angel (1998)
- I Am a Woman (2000) – compilation
- August (2001)
- Love and Pain (2003)
- Live in Montreal (2004) – live at the Montreal Jazz Festival
- After All These Years (2006) – compilation
- Angels at Christmas (2007) – 7-track EP
- Migratory Birds (2008)
- Where It Hurts (2009)
- Cello Songs (2011)
- Bloody Rain (2014)
- Compared to What (2016, with Antonio Forcione)
- Sweet Little Mystery (2019, with Tony Rémy)

with Papik

- Let the Music Play (2021)
