= Lady Marmalade =

1974 song written by Bob Crewe and Kenny Nolan

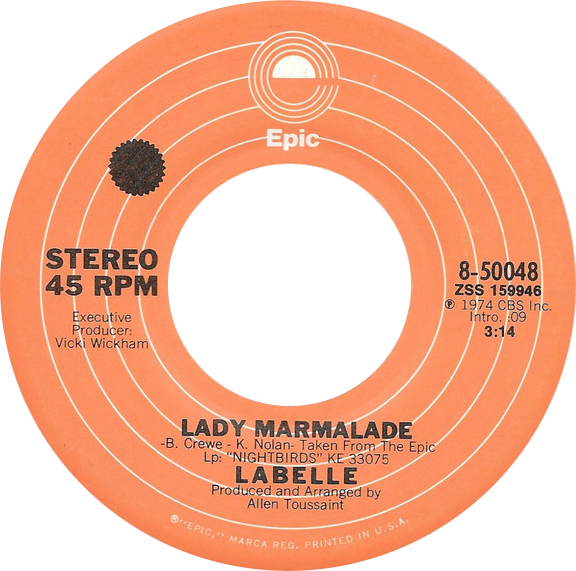
- Side A of the US single

Single by Labelle

from the album Nightbirds
- B-side: "Space Children"
- Released: November 5, 1974
- Studio: Sea Saint (New Orleans, Louisiana)
- Genre: Disco; funk; soul
- Length: 3:56 (album version); 3:15 (single version)
- Label: Epic
- Songwriters: Bob Crewe; Kenny Nolan
- Producers: Allen Toussaint; Vicki Wickham

Labelle singles chronology
"Going on a Holiday" (1973)	"Lady Marmalade" (1974)	"What Can I Do for You" (1974)

Audio video
- "Lady Marmalade" on YouTube

"Lady Marmalade" is a song written by Bob Crewe and Kenny Nolan and popularized in 1974 by the American funk rock group Labelle. It is best known for its French refrain of "Voulez-vous coucher avec moi, ce soir?", a sexual proposition that translates into English as "Do you want to come to bed with me, tonight?" Released as a single on November 5, 1974, Labelle's version held the number-one spot on the Billboard Hot 100 chart for one week, and also topped the Canadian RPM national singles chart. In 2021, the Library of Congress selected it for preservation in the National Recording Registry for being "culturally, historically, or aesthetically significant".

The song has had many cover versions over the years. In 1998, girl group All Saints released a cover version that peaked at number one on the UK Singles Chart. The 2001 version by singers Christina Aguilera, Mýa, Pink and rapper Lil' Kim, recorded for the Moulin Rouge! soundtrack, was a number-one hit on the Billboard Hot 100 for five weeks, and also a number-one hit in the UK. "Lady Marmalade" was the ninth song to reach number one by two different musical acts in America.

== Labelle version ==
=== Background and release ===
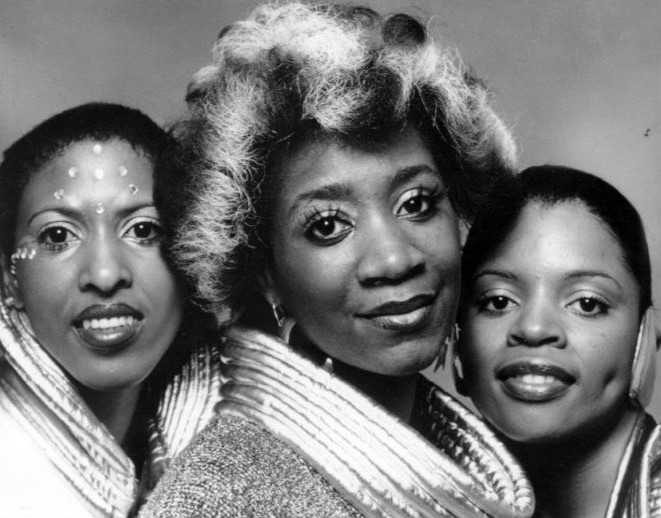
Labelle in 1975

The song was written by Bob Crewe and Kenny Nolan after Crewe visited New Orleans. A demo of the song was first recorded by The Eleventh Hour, a disco group made up of studio musicians fronted by Nolan on vocals. It was added in 1974 as a track on the Eleventh Hour's Greatest Hits LP, which did not chart. Crewe showed the song to producer Allen Toussaint in New Orleans, and Toussaint then decided to record the song with Labelle.

Labelle's version of "Lady Marmalade" was produced by Toussaint and Vicki Wickham, with the former also playing an RMI Electra-Piano on the recording. The rhythm section on this recording was the New Orleans–based funk band the Meters. "Lady Marmalade" was released as a single in November 1974 from the Night Birds album released that September, Labelle's first after signing with Epic Records. Patti LaBelle sang lead vocals on "Lady Marmalade", with backing vocals by bandmates Nona Hendryx and Sarah Dash. "Lady Marmalade" is about a man's sexual encounter with the titular prostitute, but Patti LaBelle later claimed that she was completely oblivious to its overall message, saying: "I didn't know what it was about. I don't know French and nobody, I swear this is God's truth, nobody at all told me what I'd just sung a song about."

=== Reception ===
Steve Huey of AllMusic selected the song as one of the best tracks on Labelle's 1995 compilation Lady Marmalade: The Best of Patti and Labelle. Critic Robert Christgau described it as "great synthetic French-quarter raunch".

"Lady Marmalade" is billed as the song that made Labelle one of the "hottest girl groups" of the 1970s. It was a number-one hit for one week on the Billboard Hot 100 singles chart in the United States for the week of March 29, 1975, and charted at number one for one week on the Billboard Top Soul Singles chart. Along with the track, "What Can I Do for You?", "Lady Marmalade" peaked at number seven on the disco/dance charts. The single was also a major hit in the United Kingdom, where it charted at number seventeen. "Lady Marmalade" replaced another Crewe/Nolan composition, Frankie Valli's "My Eyes Adored You", as the Billboard Hot 100 number-one single; this made Crewe and Nolan the third songwriting team in Billboard history (after Lennon–McCartney and Holland–Dozier–Holland) to replace themselves at number one. Billboard ranked it as the No. 22 song for 1975. Labelle performed "Lady Marmalade" on Soul Train on December 7, 1974.

"Lady Marmalade" debuted at number 92 on the Canadian RPM singles chart on February 1, 1975. It subsequently peaked atop the chart on March 29, 1975, after five weeks on the chart. Labelle's version of "Lady Marmalade" was inducted into the Grammy Hall of Fame in 2003. and was ranked number 479 on Rolling Stone's list of The 500 Greatest Songs of All Time in 2004 and number 485 in 2010. The Labelle version also appears in several films, including The Long Kiss Goodnight, Dick, and Jacob's Ladder. It was used in the video game Karaoke Revolution Volume 2 in a new version performed by Patti LaBelle.

Billboard ranked the song at number sixteen on their list of the "100 Greatest Girl Group Songs of All Time". In 2021, the Library of Congress selected the song for preservation in the National Recording Registry for being "culturally, historically, or aesthetically significant".

=== Track listings ===
US 7-inch single

1. "Lady Marmalade" – 3:14
2. "Space Children" – 3:04

Europe 7-inch single

1. "Lady Marmalade" – 3:14
2. "It Took a Long Time" – 4:04

=== Credits and personnel ===
- Lead vocals by Patti LaBelle
- Backing vocals by Sarah Dash and Nona Hendryx
- Instrumentation by The Meters
  - Allen Toussaint – RMI Electra Piano, percussion, arrangements
  - Art Neville – Hammond organ
  - George Porter Jr. – bass guitar
  - Leo Nocentelli, Rev. Edward Levone Batts – guitar
  - Herman "Roscoe" Ernest III – drums
  - James "Budd" Ellison – piano
  - Earl Turbinton – alto saxophone
  - Alvin Thomas – tenor saxophone
  - Clyde Kerr Jr. – trumpet
  - Lester Caliste – trombone
  - Carl Blouin – baritone saxophone
  - Clarence Ford – alto saxophone

=== Charts ===
==== Weekly charts ====
Chart (1974–1975)	Peak position
Australia (Kent Music Report)	13
Austria (Ö3 Austria Top 40)	17
Belgium (Ultratop 50 Flanders)	2
Belgium (Ultratop 50 Wallonia)	6
Canada Top Singles (RPM)	1
Finland (Suomen virallinen lista)	5
Netherlands (Dutch Top 40)	1
Netherlands (Single Top 100)	2
New Zealand (RIANZ)	21
UK Singles (Official Charts)	17
US Billboard Hot 100	1
US Hot R&B/Hip-Hop Songs (Billboard)	1
US Hot Dance Music/Club Play (Billboard)	7
West Germany (GfK)	17

==== Year-end charts ====
Chart (1975)	Position
Australia (Kent Music Report)	96
Canada Top Singles (RPM)	8
US Billboard Hot 100	22

== Certifications ==
Region	Certification	Certified units/sales
Canada (Music Canada)	Gold	75,000^{^}
France	—	150,000
United Kingdom (BPI)	Silver	200,000^{‡}
United States (RIAA)	Gold	1,000,000^{^}
^{^} Shipments figures based on certification alone.^{‡} Sales+streaming figures based on certification alone.

== Sabrina version ==
"Voulez-Vous Coucher avec Moi? (Lady Marmalade)"

Single by Sabrina

from the album Sabrina
- B-side: "Megamix"
- Released: 1987
- Length: 3:56
- Label: Baby
- Songwriters: Bob Crewe; Kenny Nolan
- Producer: Davide Romani

Sabrina singles chronology
"Sexy Girl" (1986)	"Voulez-Vous Coucher avec Moi? (Lady Marmalade)" (1987)	"Boys (Summertime Love)" (1987)

Audio video
- "Lady Marmelade" on YouTube

=== Background and release ===
"Lady Marmalade" was covered by Italian pop singer Sabrina on her eponymous album. It was released in 1987 as the album's second single by Baby Records. In some countries, including France and the Netherlands, the song was known as "Voulez-vous coucher avec moi? (Lady Marmalade)" and was released in 1988. Author James Arena named the cover among Sabrina's "relentlessly catchy" singles. The song charted at number 36 on the Belgian Flanders singles chart, number 40 on the Dutch Single Top 100, and number 41 on the French singles chart.

=== Track listings ===
7-inch maxi

1. "Lady Marmalade" – 3:55
2. "Boys, Hot Girl, Sexy Girl" (7-inch megamix) – 4:10

12-inch maxi

1. "Lady Marmalade" (12-inch remix) – 5:57
2. "Boys, Hot Girl, Sexy Girl" (12-inch megamix) – 6:04

CD maxi

1. "Lady Marmalade" (12-inch remix) – 6:08
2. "Boys, Hot Girl, Sexy Girl" (megamix) – 6:04
3. "Lady Marmalade" – 3:55

Remixed by Peter Vriends, produced by Claudio Cecchetto.

=== Charts ===
Chart (1987–1989)	Peak position
Belgium (Ultratop 50 Flanders)	36
France (SNEP)	41
Netherlands (Dutch Top 40 Tipparade) Remix	8
Netherlands (Single Top 100)	40

=== Credits and personnel ===
Credits for Sabrina's version are adapted from CD liner notes:

- Written by Bob Crewe and Kenny Nolan
- Design – Bart Falkmann
- Producer – C. Cecchetto
- Remix – Peter Vriends

== All Saints version ==
"Lady Marmalade"

Single by All Saints

from the album All Saints
- A-side: "Under the Bridge"
- B-side: "No More Lies"; "Get Bizzy"
- Released: April 27, 1998
- Studio: Metropolis (London, England)
- Length: 4:04
- Label: London
- Songwriters: Bob Crewe; Kenny Nolan
- Producers: Johnny Douglas; John Benson

All Saints singles chronology
"Never Ever" (1997)	"Under the Bridge" / "Lady Marmalade" (1998)	"Bootie Call" (1998)

Music video
- "Lady Marmalade" on YouTube

=== Background and release ===
In 1998, English-Canadian girl group All Saints released a cover version of "Lady Marmalade" as part of the double A-side single "Under the Bridge" / "Lady Marmalade". The song also appeared as the tenth track of their debut self-titled album (1997). A version remixed by Timbaland appeared on the Dr. Dolittle (1998) soundtrack. The "Lady Marmalade" portion of the single was only released in Europe, and the group performed the song at the 1998 Brit Awards.

All Saints' version features different, slightly racier lyrics for its verses, written by the group; the only lyrics retained from the original song are heard in the chorus: "gicchi-gicchi-ya-ya da-da" (though "gicchi" is changed to "coochie"), "mocha-choca-latte ya-ya" and the French "Voulez-vous coucher avec moi ce soi" ("do you want to come to bed with me tonight"). Also, instead of singing "Creole Lady Marmalade" as in the original, an unidentified female voice can be heard (albeit to the same melody) singing "Where you think you're sleepin' tonight...?" before fading into the next part of the chorus.

=== Reception ===
Daily Record described All Saints' version as a "passable version of LaBelle's disco classic". "Lady Marmalade" was the third single (fourth in Japan) from their self-titled debut studio album; it contained the "Marmalade" cover and a cover version of "Under the Bridge" by Red Hot Chili Peppers. The single reached number one on the official UK Top 40 chart, becoming the group's second number-one hit. A total of 424,799 singles have been sold in the UK, with proceeds from the single going to breast cancer charities.

=== Music video ===
The music video for the song shows the band members and other people having a dance party on one of the floors of a skyscraper in New York City at night. British actress Kathryn Allerston appears in the music video.

=== Track listings ===
All Saints CD maxi single

1. "Lady Marmalade" ('98 mix) – 4:02
2. "Lady Marmalade" (Mark's Miami Madness mix) – 7:55
3. "Lady Marmalade" (Sharp South Park vocal remix) – 8:09
4. "Lady Marmalade" (Henry & Hayne's La Jam mix) – 6:47

All Saints CD 1

1. "Under the Bridge" – 5:03
2. "Lady Marmalade" – 4:04
3. "No More Lies" – 4:08
4. "Lady Marmalade" (Henry & Haynes La Jam mix) – 9:23
5. "Under the Bridge" (promo video) – 5:00

All Saints CD 2

1. "Lady Marmalade" (Mark!'s Miami Madness mix) – 7:56
2. "Lady Marmalade" (Sharp South Park vocal remix) – 8:10
3. "Under the Bridge" (Ignorance remix featuring Jean Paul e.s.q) – 4:55
4. "Get Bizzy" – 3:45

=== Charts ===
==== Weekly charts ====
Chart (1998)	Peak position
Australia (ARIA) with "Under the Bridge"	5
Canada Top Singles (RPM)	30
Denmark (IFPI)	16
Estonia (Eesti Top 20)	17
Europe (Eurochart Hot 100) with "Under the Bridge"	6
France (SNEP)	28
Germany (GfK)	87
Iceland (Íslenski Listinn Topp 40)	22
New Zealand (Recorded Music NZ) with "Under the Bridge"	4
Scottish Singles Sales (Official Charts) with "Under the Bridge"	2
Switzerland (Schweizer Hitparade)	45
UK Singles (Official Charts) with "Under the Bridge"	1
UK Airplay (Music Week)	23
UK Hip Hop/R&B (Official Charts) with "Under the Bridge"	1

==== Year-end charts ====
Chart (1998)	Position
Australia (ARIA)	45
Europe (Eurochart Hot 100)	77
UK Singles (OCC)	27

=== Certifications ===
Region	Certification	Certified units/sales
Australia (ARIA)	Gold	35,000^{^}
United Kingdom (BPI)	Gold	432,000
^{^} Shipments figures based on certification alone.

=== Release history ===
Region	Version	Date	Format(s)	Label(s)	Ref.
United Kingdom	"Under the Bridge" / "Lady Marmalade"	April 27, 1998	CD; cassette	London	
Canada	"Lady Marmalade"	September 8, 1998	CD	London	
Japan	"Under the Bridge" / "Lady Marmalade"	September 9, 1998	CD	London	

== Moulin Rouge! version ==
"Lady Marmalade"

Single by Christina Aguilera, Lil' Kim, Mýa and Pink

from the album Moulin Rouge!
- Released: April 10, 2001
- Genre: Pop; hip-hop soul; R&B
- Length: 4:24
- Label: Interscope
- Songwriters: Bob Crewe; Kenny Nolan
- Producers: Missy Elliott; Rockwilder

Christina Aguilera singles chronology
"Nobody Wants to Be Lonely" (2001)	"Lady Marmalade" (2001)	"Falsas Esperanzas" (2001)

Lil' Kim singles chronology
"Wait a Minute" (2001)	"Lady Marmalade" (2001)	"In the Air Tonite" (2001)

Mýa singles chronology
"Free" (2001)	"Lady Marmalade" (2001)	"My Love Is Like...Wo" (2003)

Pink singles chronology
"You Make Me Sick" (2000)	"Lady Marmalade" (2001)	"Get the Party Started" (2001)

Music video
- "Lady Marmalade" on YouTube

=== Background and release ===
In 2001, "Lady Marmalade" appeared as part of a medley in the Baz Luhrmann musical film Moulin Rouge!. For the film's soundtrack album, Christina Aguilera, Lil' Kim, Mýa, and Pink recorded a new version of the song, which was released as the soundtrack's first single in April 2001. Produced by Missy Elliott and writing partner Rockwilder, the song includes an outro by Elliott. Some lyrics were changed from the original version, with Lil' Kim's rap verse being the most obvious new addition. The reworked version transfers the song's setting to the film's titular Moulin Rouge cabaret in Paris.

Aguilera said that she embraced the idea of collaborating with Elliott, Pink, Mýa, and Lil' Kim on the track as soon as it was pitched to her" "I'm a fan of all of theirs, and just to be in the same song doing something with them—collaborating, which I love to do, is a really big thing for me. And it's cool to be out there before my next album comes out there, too." All four singers recorded their vocal parts in separate sessions. Mýa noted that "I think everyone had a schedule and was on tour and doing things at the time."

=== Critical reception ===
The Moulin Rouge! version of "Lady Marmalade" received mixed-to-positive reviews. AllMusic's Brand Kohlenstein praised it saying that "the ladies teamed up for a surefire hit with their naughtier version of Patti Labelle's 'Lady Marmalade.'" Slant Magazine praised the collaboration as well, describing it as "an accolade to the performers' various distinctive styles, with Lil' Kim trashing it up and Aguilera caterwauling her way through the second half of the song". The Sun Journal opined that the Moulin Rouge! version helped the song "find a new life". In a retrospective review, journalist Bianca Gracie noted that it "highlighted each artist's signature style: Lil Kim's raunchy raps, Pink's soulful tone, Mya's sultry coos, and Aguilera's theatrical vocal runs". However, Rob Sheffield of Rolling Stone called it "god-awful".

MTV ranked "Lady Marmalade" at number six on their list of the best songs of 2001, and LiveAbout.com placed it at number 21 on its list of the hundred best pop songs of the year. Entertainment Weekly's Andrew Hampp named it the best all-female musical collaboration from 1998 to 2018. The song won Best Pop Collaboration with Vocals at the 44th Annual Grammy Awards in 2002.

=== Chart performance ===
This version of the song reached No. 1 in its eighth week on the U.S. Billboard Hot 100 and spent five weeks at the top of the chart, 26 years after Labelle's version had reached No. 1, making "Lady Marmalade" the ninth song in history to top the U.S. chart when performed by different artists. It was the third airplay-only song in Billboard chart history (after Aaliyah's 2000 single "Try Again" and Shaggy's 2001 single "Angel") to hit No. 1 without being released in a major, commercially available single format.

The song also holds the record for the longest-reigning No. 1 on Billboard's Mainstream Top 40 chart for an all-female collaboration, topping the chart for nine consecutive weeks. "Lady Marmalade" is the best-selling single for Lil' Kim and Mýa. Lil' Kim also held the record for having the longest No. 1 single on the Billboard Hot 100 for a female rapper, with "Lady Marmalade" being on the top of the charts for five consecutive weeks, until Australian rapper Iggy Azalea's "Fancy" surpassed that record, holding the No. 1 position for seven weeks in 2014. "Lady Marmalade" was included on the non-US versions of Aguilera's first greatest hits album, Keeps Gettin' Better: A Decade of Hits (2008). "Lady Marmalade" was the top-selling song of 2001 and had sold 5.2 million copies worldwide by December of that year.

In the United Kingdom, "Lady Marmalade" debuted at number 1 on that country's Official Singles Chart, and spent six weeks in the Top 10 and a total of nineteen weeks in the Top 100.

In Europe, alongside the UK, "Lady Marmalade" met a satisfying commercial success and peaked at the top in 10 countries, becoming Lil Kim's and P!nk's first number one in most of them, including Germany, Hungary, Sweden, Norway, Spain, Portugal, Ireland and Switzerland, top five in Finland, the Netherlands, Austria, Italy and Belgium, and top fifteen in France and Poland.

The song was only mildly successful in Asia; in Japan it peaked at no. 38 and spent only three weeks on the chart.

=== Music video ===
"We wanted to showcase each of the 'four badass chicks from the Moulin Rouge' bringing together their different skills and personas into a true celebration of diversity, talent, and female unity."

— Missy Elliott, the song's co-producer; 2021.

The music video, directed by Paul Hunter, filmed in March 2001 shows all four performers in lingerie in a cabaret-style video (with rapper Missy Elliott giving an introduction) and was filmed on sets built to resemble the actual Moulin Rouge nightclub around the turn of the 20th century. Interviewed by MTV News, the singers expressed their excitement about the video. Pink predicted the clip would be like a "circus on acid", while Aguilera said that "The video's going to be dope." She further elaborated on the video's concept, saying: "We're going to be having cabaret costumes. It's something you've never seen from us before. So, it's going to be fun."

The video's art direction anachronistically merged hip-hop sensibility with the film's French cabaret setting, thanks to some props and costumes actually used in the movie, according to Hunter's office. Choreographer Tina Landon was hired to choreograph the video. The video won the 2001 MTV Video Music Award for "Best Video of the Year" and "Best Video from a Film". The four singers performed the song live at the 2001 MTV Movie Awards, as well as at the 44th Annual Grammy Awards (2002), the latter performance featuring an appearance by Patti LaBelle, herself. In March 2021, Glenn Garner of the People magazine noted that "Lady Marmalade" "remains one of the most iconic music videos of our time". The video received a Vevo Certified Award on YouTube for over 100 million views. As of 2024, the music video has over 555 million views on Aguilera's official YouTube channel.

=== Legacy ===
The song is considered a gay anthem. According to Kelley Dunlap of BuzzFeed, the Moulin Rouge! version of "Lady Marmalade" influenced Jessie J, Ariana Grande, and Nicki Minaj's 2014 song "Bang Bang". It was featured in the music montage at the 92nd Academy Awards, which covered iconic movie soundtrack songs. "Lady Marmalade" was also featured in an episode of the thirteenth season (2021) of RuPaul's Drag Race, where contestants Tina Burner, Elliott with 2 Ts and Kahmora Hall had to perform a lip sync of the song. In 2022, Brazilian drag singers Gloria Groove, Grag Queen and Pabllo Vittar performed a version of "Lady Marmalade" on the Brazilian music program Música Boa Ao Vivo ("good live music"). The trio featured Groove rapping Lil Kim's verses, and all three performing live vocals.

==== Broadway version ====
Moulin Rouge!, the musical, opened on Broadway at the Al Hirschfeld Theatre on July 25, 2019, featuring "Lady Marmalade" sung by The Lady M's: Nini 'Legs-in-the-Air' (Robyn Hurder), Arabia (Holly James), Baby Doll (Jeigh Madjus) and La Chocolat (Jacqueline B. Arnold). The song has been used in many promotional videos, and both opens and closes the show. A Broadway cast recording was released in fall 2019.

=== Track listing ===
CD maxi

1. "Lady Marmalade" (edit) – 4:24
2. "Lady Marmalade" (Thunderpuss radio mix) – 4:09
3. "Lady Marmalade" (Thunderpuss club mix) – 9:48
4. "Lady Marmalade" (Thunderpuss Mixshow mix) – 6:21

=== Personnel ===
- Missy Elliott – producer, vocals
- Mýa – vocals
- P!nk – vocals
- Lil' Kim – vocals
- Christina Aguilera – vocals
- Bob Crewe – writer
- Kenny Nolan – writer
- Laura Ziffren – music supervisor, executive music producer
- Anton Monsted – music supervisor, executive music producer
- Ron Fair – vocal producer
- Michael Knobloch – music production supervisor
- John "Beetle" Bailey – assistant engineer
- Chris Barrett – assistant engineer
- Marius de Vries – music direction
- Ozzy Osbourne – performer
- Joe Leguabe – performer
- Robert Kraft – executive in charge of music
- Dylan Dresdow – engineer
- Chris Elliott – conductor
- Ricky Graham – assistant engineer
- Isobel Griffiths – orchestra contractor
- Jake Jackson – assistant engineer
- Jennie O'Grady – choir master
- Dave Pensado – mixing
- Carmen Rizzo – engineer
- Michael C. Ross – engineer
- Eddy Schreyer – mastering
- Brian Springer – engineer
- Gavyn Wright – orchestra leader

=== Charts ===
==== Weekly charts ====
Chart (2001)	Peak position
Australia (ARIA)	1
Australian Urban (ARIA)	1
Austria (Ö3 Austria Top 40)	3
Belgium (Ultratop 50 Flanders)	2
Belgium (Ultratop 50 Wallonia)	3
Canada (Nielsen SoundScan)	13
Canada Airplay (BDS)	9
Canada CHR (Nielsen BDS)	1
Croatia International Airplay (HRT) (Note: Only a partial archive of the Croatian chart is available so it is possible that the single had a higher peak.)	4
Denmark (Tracklisten)	2
Europe (Eurochart Hot 100)	1
Finland (Suomen virallinen lista)	2
France (SNEP)	12
Germany (GfK)	1
Greece (IFPI)	1
Hungary (Mahasz)	1
Ireland (IRMA)	1
Italy (FIMI)	6
Japan (Oricon)	38
Netherlands (Dutch Top 40)	2
Netherlands (Single Top 100)	2
New Zealand (Recorded Music NZ)	1
Norway (VG-lista)	1
Poland Airplay (Music & Media)	12
Poland (Polish Airplay Charts)	23
Portugal (AFP)	1
Romania (Romanian Top 100)	2
Scottish Singles Sales (Official Charts)	1
Spain (Promusicae)	1
Sweden (Sverigetopplistan)	1
Switzerland (Schweizer Hitparade)	1
UK Singles (Official Charts)	1
UK Dance (Official Charts)	21
UK Hip Hop/R&B (Official Charts)	1
Uruguay (IFPI)	8
US Billboard Hot 100	1
US Adult Pop Airplay (Billboard)	25
US Dance Club Songs (Billboard)	3
US Dance Singles Sales (Billboard)	17
US Hot R&B/Hip-Hop Songs (Billboard)	43
US Pop Airplay (Billboard)	1
US Rhythmic Airplay (Billboard)	1
US Top 40 Tracks (Billboard)	1

Chart (2021)	Peak position
US Digital Song Sales (Billboard)	5

==== Year-end charts ====
Chart (2001)	Position
Australia (ARIA)	13
Australian Urban (ARIA)	5
Austria (Ö3 Austria Top 30)	11
Belgium (Ultratop 50 Flanders)	15
Belgium (Ultratop 50 Wallonia)	27
Brazil (Crowley)	4
Canada (Nielsen SoundScan)	99
Canada Radio (Nielsen BDS)	44
Europe (Eurochart Hot 100)	8
France (SNEP)	51
Germany (Media Control)	11
Ireland (IRMA)	10
Netherlands (Dutch Top 40)	24
Netherlands (Single Top 100)	10
New Zealand (RIANZ)	20
Romania (Romanian Top 100)	46
Spain (AFYVE)	6
Sweden (Hitlistan)	8
Switzerland (Schweizer Hitparade)	5
UK Singles (OCC)	14
US Billboard Hot 100	24
US Adult Top 40 (Billboard)	74
US Mainstream Top 40 (Billboard)	4
US Rhythmic Top 40 (Billboard)	16

==== Decade-end charts ====
Chart (2000–2009)	Position
Netherlands (Single Top 100)	42

=== Certifications ===
Region	Certification	Certified units/sales
Australia (ARIA)	2× Platinum	140,000^{^}
Austria (IFPI Austria)	Gold	20,000^{*}
Belgium (BRMA)	Platinum	50,000^{*}
Brazil (Pro-Música Brasil)	Gold	30,000^{‡}
Denmark (IFPI Danmark)	Gold	45,000^{‡}
France (SNEP)	Gold	250,000^{*}
Germany (BVMI)	Platinum	500,000^{‡}
Greece (IFPI Greece)	Gold	10,000^{^}
Italy (FIMI)	Gold	25,000^{*}
Netherlands (NVPI)	Platinum	60,000^{^}
New Zealand (RMNZ)	2× Platinum	60,000^{‡}
Norway (IFPI Norway)	Platinum	
Sweden (GLF)	Platinum	30,000^{^}
Switzerland (IFPI Switzerland)	Gold	20,000^{^}
United Kingdom (BPI)	2× Platinum	1,060,000
United States (RIAA)	Platinum	1,000,000^{‡}
^{*} Sales figures based on certification alone.^{^} Shipments figures based on certification alone.^{‡} Sales+streaming figures based on certification alone.

=== Release history ===
Release dates and formats for "Lady Marmalade"
Region	Date	Format	Label	Ref.
United States	April 10, 2001	Rhythmic contemporary radio	Interscope	
Australia	April 23, 2001	CD	Festival Mushroom	
United States	June 12, 2001	12-inch vinyl	Interscope	
United Kingdom	June 18, 2001	CD; cassette	Interscope	
Japan	July 18, 2001	Maxi-CD	Universal Japan	
