= Se stiamo insieme =

Single by Riccardo Cocciante

from the album Cocciante
- B-side: "Se stiamo insieme (Instrumental)"
- Released: February 1991
- Genre: Pop
- Length: 4:38
- Label: Virgin Dischi
- Composer: Riccardo Cocciante
- Lyricist: Mogol

Riccardo Cocciante singles chronology
"Un desiderio di vita indicibile" (1987)	"Se stiamo insieme" (1991)	"E mi arriva il mare" (1991)

Audio
- "Se stiamo insieme" on YouTube

"Se stiamo insieme" ("If We Are Together", "If We Are a Couple") is a 1991 Italian song written by Riccardo Cocciante (music) and Mogol (lyrics) and performed by Riccardo Cocciante.

This song won the 41st edition of the Sanremo Music Festival, where it was also performed in an English-language adaptation titled "I'm Missing You" by Sarah Jane Morris.

== Track listing ==
- 7" single
1. "Se stiamo insieme" (Riccardo Cocciante, Mogol) – 4:38
2. "Se stiamo insieme (Instrumental)" (Riccardo Cocciante) – 4:38

== Charts ==
Chart	Peak position
Belgium (Ultratop)	43
Europe (European Hot 100 Singles)	60
Italy (Musica e dischi)	1
Netherlands (Dutch Charts)	29
