= Fratelli d'Italia (1989 film) =

- Italian theatrical release poster by Enzo Sciotti
- Directed by: Neri Parenti
- Written by: Carlo Vanzina; Enrico Vanzina
- Starring: Christian De Sica; Sabrina Salerno; Massimo Boldi; Jerry Calà
- Cinematography: Roberto Gerardi
- Edited by: Sergio Montanari
- Release date: 1989
- Running time: 98 min.
- Language: Italian

Fratelli d'Italia (Brothers of Italy) is a 1989 Italian comedy film directed by Neri Parenti.

== Plot summary ==
Three episodes held together by a common element: a car rented by three different characters. A salesman ends up the case to pass a great weekend on a VIP boat. An employee saw go up in smoke the long-awaited night of passion with the wife of the chief. A Milan fan forced by circumstances to pretend frantic Roma player.

== Cast ==
- Massimo Boldi as Rag. Carlo Verdone
- Jerry Calà as Roberto Marcolin
- Christian De Sica as Cesare Proietti
- Sabrina Salerno as Michela Sauli
- Gian Fabio Bosco as Commendator Sauli
- Maurizio Mattioli as Remo
- Nathalie Caldonazzo as Turchese De Benedetti
- Angelo Bernabucci as Romolo
- Fabrizio Bracconeri as Sergio
- Gloria Paul
- Ida Galli
- Massimo Serato
