= A Flower's Broken =

Studio album by Sabrina Salerno
- Released: January 1999
- Recorded: 1998
- Genre: Pop
- Label: RTI Music
- Producer: Sabrina; Enrico Monti

Sabrina Salerno chronology
Maschio dove sei (1996)	A Flower's Broken (1999)	Erase/Rewind Official Remix (2008)

Singles from A Flower's Broken
- 1. "I Love You" Released: 1998

A Flower's Broken is the fifth studio album by Italian pop singer Sabrina Salerno, released in January 1999.

== Album information ==
In January 1999, A Flower's Broken – Sabrina's fifth album, produced by Enrico Monti and herself – was released in Italy and Spain by the RTI-Music label. Style-wise, the album saw Sabrina's return to electronic dance-pop, the type of music she had made prior to 1995's Maschio Dove Sei album. The album also features influences from trip hop, europop and middle eastern music. The album was unsuccessful due to RTI Music (controlled by Mediaset) being sold at the same time, and all marketing and promotion was abruptly stopped. The album only had one single, "I Love You", release in late 1998 before the promotion was stopped. The music video received criticism for being very provocative.

== Track listings ==
1. "Shallala" – 3:20
2. "Jimmy" – 4:08
3. "I Love You" – 4:32
4. "Diamond in the Sand" – 3:54
5. "I Want You" – 3:49
6. "You Oughta Know" – 3:59
7. "Flower's Broken" – 4:32
8. "Love Is All There Is" – 3:23
9. "Russian Lover" (with Dimitri Kusnitzof) – 3:50
10. "Never Too Late" – 9:43
