= Yeah Yeah (Sabrina song) =

Single by Sabrina

from the album Over the Pop
- Released: March 1990
- Recorded: 1989/1990
- Length: 4:01
- Label: Casablanca Records
- Songwriters: Sabrina; Elvio Moratto
- Producer: Severo Lombardoni

Sabrina singles chronology
"Gringo" (1989)	"Yeah Yeah" (1990)	"Siamo donne" (1991)

Alternative Cover
- 1991's Release Cover.

Audio video
- "Yeah Yeah" on YouTube

Audio sample
- file; help

"Yeah Yeah" is a song by Italian singer Sabrina and produced by Severo Lombardoni. It was released in March 1990 as the first single from Sabrina's third album, Over the Pop. The song reached No. 21 in Italy.

== Song information ==
"Yeah Yeah" is an upbeat dance-pop track written by Sabrina herself and Elvio Moratto. Lyric-wise, the song's concerns are the joys of a nice and healthy environment. "Yeah Yeah" was released as a single twice, the first release in 1990 remaining Italian-only. Three mixes were released in 1990 — a 7-inch mix, a 12-inch mix and an ambient mix — on two formats: a 7-inch single and a 12-inch single.

In late 1990/early 1991, the Italian dance-label Discomagic released four remixes of "Yeah Yeah" on both a standard and a picture-disc 12-inch.

The track makes use of the "Yeah! Woo!" sample from "Think (About It)" by Lyn Collins and James Brown.

== Formats and track listings ==
=== 1990 release ===
7-inch Single

1. "Yeah Yeah" – 4:01
2. "Yeah Yeah" (dub version) – 4:01

12-inch Single

1. "Yeah Yeah" (Mix Version) – 5:35
2. "Yeah Yeah" (Ambient Mix) – 6:16

=== 1991 release ===
CD single

1. "Yeah Yeah" (club version) – 5:00
2. "Yeah Yeah" (a cappella) – 1:26
3. "Yeah Yeah" – 4:20
4. "Yeah Yeah" (dub version) – 4:16

12-inch single

1. "Yeah Yeah" (club version) – 5:00
2. "Yeah Yeah" (a cappella) – 1:26
3. "Yeah Yeah" – 4:20
4. "Yeah Yeah" (dub version) – 4:16

== Charts ==
Chart performance for "Yeah Yeah"
Chart (1990)	Peak position
Italy (Musica e dischi)	24
