= Sabrina (album) =

Studio album by Sabrina
- Released: 24 September 1987
- Recorded: 1986–1987
- Genres: Pop; italo disco
- Length: 35:44
- Label: Ariola
- Producer: Claudio Cecchetto

Sabrina chronology
Sabrina (1987)	Something Special (1988)

Singles from Sabrina
- 1. "Sexy Girl" Released: August 1986; 2. "Lady Marmalade" Released: 1987; 3. "Boys (Summertime Love)" Released: 29 May 1987; 4. "Hot Girl" Released: November 1987

Sabrina is the debut studio album by the Italian pop singer Sabrina, released on 24 September 1987 by Ariola.

== Album information ==
The album includes her first four singles; in addition to "Sexy Girl", it includes Sabrina's international top 5 breakthrough, the smash hit single "Boys (Summertime Love)", which has sold more than 1.5 million copies to date worldwide, and "Hot Girl", which made the top 10 in five European countries.

== Track listing ==
Sabrina track listing
No.	Title	Writer(s)	Length
1.	"Boys (Summertime Love)"	Matteo Bonsanto; Roberto Rossi; Claudio Cecchetto; Malcolm Charlton	3:55
2.	"Hot Girl"	Bonsanto; Rossi; Cecchetto	3:22
3.	"Get Ready (Holiday Rock)"	Bonsanto; Rossi; Cecchetto; Charlton	3:30
4.	"Kiss"	Prince Rogers Nelson	3:57
5.	"Sexy Girl"	Bonsanto; Rossi; Naimy Ruth Hackett	3:25
6.	"Kiss Me"	Bonsanto; Rossi; Tracy Spencer; Walter Biondi	4:08
7.	"Lady Marmalade"	Bob Crewe; Kenny Nolan	4:07
8.	"My Sharona"	Douglas Fieger; Berton Averre	4:44
9.	"Da Ya Think I'm Sexy?"	Roderick Stewart; Carmine Appice; Duane Hitchings	4:34
Total length:			35:44

== Personnel ==
- Sabrina Salerno – lead vocals and backing vocals
- Malcolm Charlton – rap and backing vocals
- Roberto Rossi – synthesizers, sequencer, drum machine and backing vocals
- Claudio Bazzari – electric guitar on tracks 1–3 & 5–6
- Betty Vittori, Matteo Bonsanto – backing vocals

== Charts ==
Chart (1987–88)	Peak position
Australian Albums (ARIA)	113
Finnish Albums (Suomen virallinen lista)	4
French Albums (SNEP)	24
Swiss Albums (Schweizer Hitparade)	11

== Certifications ==
Certifications
Region	Certification	Certified units/sales
Spain (Promusicae)	Gold	50,000^{^}
^{^} Shipments figures based on certification alone.
