= Siamo donne (song) =

Single by Sabrina and Jo Squillo

from the album Over the Pop
- B-side: "With a Boy Like You"; "Whole Lotta Love"
- Released: January 1991
- Length: 3:38
- Label: Casablanca Records
- Songwriter: Giovanna Coletti

Sabrina singles chronology
| "Yeah Yeah" (1990) | "Siamo donne" (1991) | "Shadows of the Night" (1991) |

Jo Squillo singles chronology
| "Whole Lotta Love" (1990) | "Siamo donne" (1991) | "Me gusta il movimento" (1992) |

Audio video
- "Siamo donne" on YouTube

"Siamo donne" (English: "We Are Women") is a duet by Sabrina and Jo Squillo. The single was released in January 1991 and appeared on the album picture disc edition of Sabrina's third studio album Over the Pop.

Written by Jo Squillo, credited with her real name Giovanna Coletti, the song marked two firsts for Sabrina: her debut duet and her first Italian language single. The duo premiered the song at the 1991 Sanremo Music Festival, where it was not well received by the press, placing only 13th.

On the other hand, the sales results were more successful. "Siamo donne", partly thanks to the duo's many appearances on numerous TV shows, reached number eleven in the singles chart and became one of the hits of that year.

== Formats and track listings ==
7" Single

1. "Siamo donne" – 3:38
2. "Siamo donne" (Instrumental) – 3:38

Cassette Single

1. "Siamo donne" – 3:38
2. "With a Boy Like You" (Sabrina) – 4:46
3. "Whole Lotta Love" (Jo Squillo) – 2:55

== Charts ==
| Chart | Peak position |
|---|---|
| Italy (Musica e dischi) | 11 |
