= Maschio dove sei =

Studio album by Sabrina Salerno
- Released: 1996
- Recorded: 1995–1996
- Genre: Pop rock
- Length: 37:26
- Label: NAR
- Producers: Sabrina Salerno; Massimo Riva; Enrico Monti

Sabrina Salerno chronology
| Over the Pop (1991) | Maschio dove sei (1996) | A Flower's Broken (1999) |

Singles from Maschio Dove Sei
- 1. "Fatta e Rifatta" Released: 1995; 2. "Maschio Dove Sei" Released: 1995 (Promo in Italy)

Maschio dove sei is the fourth studio album by Italian pop singer Sabrina Salerno. It was released in 1996.

== Album information ==
This was the first album to be released under her complete name and her first album in the Italian language. In 1995, Sabrina started to record songs in the Italian language and in an Italo-rock style completely different from her previous dance-style. Even some tracks that she had recorded in English in 1994 were re-recorded in this new style, like the track "Maybe Your Love", which became "Gioco Perverso". The result was the Maschio Dove Sei album, which was released by the Italian NAR-label late in 1995. The album was later licensed to Barsa Promociones in Spain, who released it with a slightly different picture-sleeve and a different print on the CD.

In 1997, the album was re-released in Italy with a new cover, a new title, Numeri, and a new song with the same name.

== Track listings ==
1. "Maschio Dove Sei" – 4:53
2. "Palpito D'Amore" – 3:56
3. "Fatta e Rifatta" – 4:13
4. "Cuore" – 4:04
5. "Non Va" – 2:52
6. "La Porta È Sempre Là" – 3:49
7. "Alice Rivivrà" – 3:27
8. "Messico" – 3:47
9. "Tango Italiano" – 3:29
10. "Gioco Perverso" – 4:56
