= Like a Yo-Yo =

Single by Sabrina

from the album Super Sabrina
- B-side: "Doctors Orders"; "Sex"
- Released: February 1989
- Genre: Italo disco; hi-NRG
- Length: 3:27
- Label: Metronome
- Songwriter: Giorgio Moroder
- Producer: Giorgio Moroder

Sabrina singles chronology
"My Chico" (1988)	"Like a Yo-Yo" (1989)	"Gringo" (1989)

Audio video
- "Like a Yo Yo" on YouTube

"Like a Yo-Yo" is a song by Italian singer Sabrina. This song was written and produced by Italian singer, songwriter, DJ and record producer Giorgio Moroder, and was released in February 1989, as the third and final single from the album, Super Sabrina. The song's B-sides "Doctors Orders" and "Sex" appeared on Sabrina's second studio album. "Like A Yo-Yo" was Sabrina's first collaboration with disco-legend Giorgio Moroder and peaked at number-one in Finland, charted within the top-ten in Denmark and Spain; in the United Kingdom, the single reached number 72. For the single release, the song, originally from the Super Sabrina album, was remixed by the English team of Stock Aitken Waterman for 7" and 12" use, which had been responsible for Sabrina's 1988 single "All of Me (Boy Oh Boy)". Videogram only used the 12"-remix, while Carrere in France used both, but edited the 7"-version. Different picture-sleeves were used for the 7" and 12"-releases in Italy. France (and the UK in 1989) used the Italian 12" design on all formats.

== Formats and track listings ==
- CD single
1. "Like a Yo-Yo" (Extended Mix) – 4:27
2. "Like a Yo-Yo" – 3:27
3. "Sex" – 4:10
- 7" single
1. "Like a Yo-Yo" – 3:27
2. "Doctors Orders" – 3:18
- 12" single
1. "Like a Yo-Yo" (Extended Mix) – 4:27
2. "Doctors Orders" – 3:18
- 12" remix
1. "Like a Yo-Yo" (PWL Mix) – 6:37
2. "Like a Yo-Yo" – 3:27
3. "Doctors Orders" – 3:18

== Charts ==
Chart performance for "Like a Yo-Yo"
Chart (1989)	Peak position
Denmark (IFPI)	2
Finland (Suomen virallinen lista)	1
Spain (AFYVE)	10
UK Singles (Official Charts)	72
