= My Chico =

Single by Sabrina

from the album Super Sabrina
- Released: October 1988
- Recorded: 1988
- Genre: Italo disco
- Length: 3:39
- Label: Metronome
- Songwriters: Sabrina; O. Johnson; Elvio Moratto
- Producer: Elvio Moratto

Sabrina singles chronology
"All of Me (Boy Oh Boy)" (1988)	"My Chico" (1988)	"Like a Yo-Yo" (1989)

Audio video
- "My Chico" on YouTube

"My Chico" is a song by the Italian singer Sabrina. It was written by Sabrina, O.Johnson, Elvio Moratto and produced by Elvio Moratto. The song was released in October 1988 as the album's second single. The song peaked at number two in Italy. The music video for this song was filmed in Florence.

== Song information ==
"My Chico" was Sabrina's second single in 1988, and was successful in a number of European countries. The song reached No. 1 in the Italian singles chart, and made the top 10 in Finland, Spain, Switzerland and the Netherlands. Sabrina co-wrote the song with Elvio Moratto, who would become her collaborator and producer for several more songs, including "Gringo" and some tracks on 1991's "Over the Pop" album.

== Formats and track listings ==
7" single

1. "My Chico" - 3:40
2. "My Chico" (dub house mix) - 4:30

12" single

1. "My Chico" (extended mix) - 5:25
2. "My Chico" (dub house mix version) - 5:15
3. "My Chico" - 3:39

CD maxi

1. "My Chico" (extended version) - 5:25
2. "My Chico" (dub house mix) - 5:15
3. "My Chico" (radio version) - 3:40

CD maxi

1. "My Chico" (radio version) - 3:43
2. "My Chico" (dub house mix) - 5:14
3. "All of Me" - 6:37
4. "All of Me" (instrumental version) - 4:23

== Credits ==
- Written by Moratto E., Johnson O. and Sabrina S.
- Artwork by Claude Caudron (12") and MJS (CD maxi)
- Photography by Roberto Rocchi
- Produced by Menzione

== Charts ==
Chart performance for "My Chico"
Chart (1988)	Peak position
Finland (Suomen virallinen lista)	3
Italy (Musica e dischi)	2
Spain (AFYVE)	6
West Germany (GfK)	56
