= Jo Squillo =

Italian singer-songwriter (born 1962)

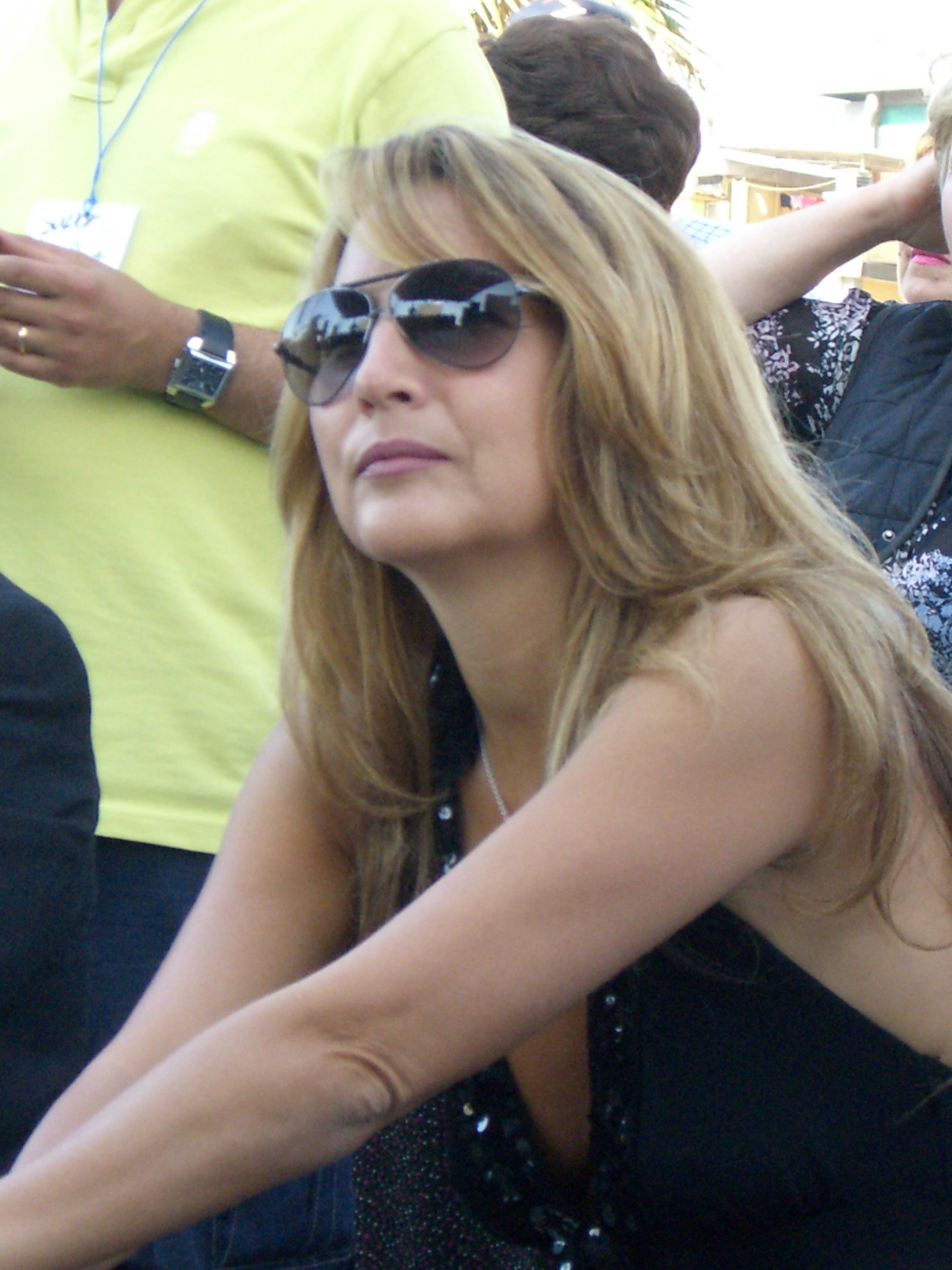

Background information
- Born: Giovanna Maria Coletti; 22 June 1962 (age 63); Milan, Italy
- Occupations: Singer; songwriter; television presenter
- Years active: 1979–present

Giovanna Maria Coletti (born 22 June 1962), known professionally as Jo Squillo, is an Italian singer-songwriter and television presenter.

== Life and career ==
Born in Milan, Coletti started doing music at the Santa Marta self-managed social center in her hometown. In October 1979, she founded the all-female punk rock band Kandeggina Gang and adopted her stage name.

In 1981, following the break-up of the band, Squillo made her solo debut with the single "Skizzo Skizzo" and the album Girl senza paura, which included the provocative and controversial "Violentami" ('Rape me'). In 1982, she released the single "Africa", dedicated to Nelson Mandela, and appeared on the cover of the German magazine Stern. Starting from the 1984 single "I Love Muchacha", her style became pop-oriented. In 1991, she entered the main competition at the Sanremo Music Festival with a successful duet with Sabrina Salerno, "Siamo donne". Her planned participation in the 1992 Festival was cancelled at the last moment when her song was deemed ineligible, as it had already been performed in concert. She subsequently took part in the 1993 edition of the Festival with "Balla italiano", which did not reach the final.

From the 2000s onward, Squillo has focused primarily on television, specializing in lifestyle and fashion-related programming. She is the founder of the non-profit organization Wall Of Dolls.
