= Hot Girl (Sabrina song) =

Single by Sabrina

from the album Sabrina
- B-side: "Kiss Me"
- Released: November 1987
- Genre: Italo disco • Eurobeat
- Length: 3:22
- Label: Baby Records
- Songwriters: Matteo Bonsanto; Claudio Cecchetto; Roberto Rossi
- Producers: Claudio Cecchetto, mixed by M. Bonsanto and R. Rossi

Sabrina singles chronology
| "Boys (Summertime Love)" (1987) | "Hot Girl" (1987) | "All of Me (Boy Oh Boy)" (1988) |

Audio video
- "Hot Girl" on YouTube

"Hot Girl" is an Italo disco/pop song by Italian singer Sabrina. It was released by Baby Records in November 1987 as the album's fourth and final single. The B-side "Kiss Me" also appeared on her debut album. The song was a success in France, Switzerland, Germany and the Netherlands where it was a top 20 hit.

== Release and promotion ==
After the enormous success with "Boys (Summertime Love)", the team around Sabrina's manager Menzione tried to score another international hit with a new single. They chose "Hot Girl", a song from Sabrina's by-then-released first album, and had it remixed for the single release. Although Sabrina heavily promoted the song (in a Spanish TV show, she danced in such an enthusiastic way that her breasts fell out of her top), the song did not match the success of "Boys (Summertime Love)".

== Critical reception ==
In his 2017 book Europe's Stars of '80s Dance Pop: 32 International Music Legends Discuss Their Careers, James Arena described "Hot Girl" as being the "retentlessly catchy follow-up single [after "Boys (Summertime Love)"], another electrifying, hook-laden dance jam", and underlined the remixed version by Phil Harding at PWL Studios which added "erotic vocal gasps and whipping sound effects set to a thunderous beat".

== Chart performance ==
"Hot Girl" was not intended to be marketed in the United Kingdom, as "Boys (Summertime Love)" was re-released in June 1988 after a commercial failure four months earlier, followed by "All of Me (Boy Oh Boy)" in October of the same year. In Continental Europe, it was released in two times: first in the last two months of 1987 in the majority of European countries, then in the first half of 1988 in Spain and France; as a consequence, on the Pan-European Hot 100 Singles chart established by the Music & Media magazine, its 23-week chart trajectory is divided into two segments with a two-month hiatus, including a peak at number 36 in its second week. Regarding the national charts, "Hot Girl" peaked within the top ten in Spain where it reached number two, being unable to dislodge Pet Shop Boys' "Always on My Mind" atop, the Flanders part of Belgium and Finland where it attained number six, and the Netherlands where it reached number ten twice. It was a top 20 hit in other three nations: France, where it debuted at number 28 and reached number 12 five weeks later, spending a total of 13 weeks in the top 50, Switzerland where it culminated at number 13, and Germany where it was present for 13 weeks on the national chart with a peak at number 19. In Sabrina's home-country, Italy, it missed the top 20 by one place, peaking at number 21 for two weeks.

== Track listings ==
- 7" single
1. "Hot Girl" – 3:22
2. "Kiss Me" – 4:05
- 12" maxi
1. "Hot Girl" (new version) – 6:04
2. "Hot Girl" (dub version) – 7:03

== Credits ==
- Written by Cecchetto, Bonsanto and Rossi
- Engineered by F.Santamaria and L. Vittori
- Remixed by Matteo Bonsanto and Roberto Ross
- Edited by Matteo Bonsanto and Roberto Rossi
- Executive produced by Matteo Bonsanto and Roberto Rossi
- Produced by Claudio Cecchetto

== Charts ==
Chart performance for "Hot Girl"
| Chart (1987–1988) | Peak position |
|---|---|
| Belgium (Ultratop 50 Flanders) | 6 |
| Europe (European Hot 100 Singles) | 36 |
| Finland (Suomen virallinen lista) | 6 |
| France (SNEP) | 12 |
| Italy (Musica e dischi) | 21 |
| Netherlands (Dutch Top 40) | 10 |
| Netherlands (Single Top 100) | 10 |
| Spain (AFYVE) | 2 |
| Switzerland (Schweizer Hitparade) | 13 |
| West Germany (GfK) | 19 |
