= Gringo (Sabrina song) =

Single by Sabrina
- Released: July 1989
- Recorded: 1988/1989
- Genre: Eurodisco
- Length: 3:55
- Label: Metronome
- Songwriter(s): Sabrina Salerno; David Sion; Elvio Moratto
- Producer(s): Giampiero Menzione

Sabrina singles chronology
"Like a Yo-Yo" (1989)	"Gringo" (1989)	"Yeah Yeah" (1990)

Audio video
- "Gringo (Radio Version)" on YouTube

"Gringo" is a song by Italian singer Sabrina. It was produced by Giampiero Menzione. The song was released as a non-album single in July 1989. It was a minor hit in UK, where it peaked at number 95.

== Song information ==
'Gringo' was written by Sabrina and Elvio Moratto. Outside Italy, "Gringo" was licensed to the international record label BMG which resulted in the song being released in many countries and formats.

== Critical reception ==
William Shaw of Smash Hits was deeply disappointed by material: "So grisly, one hardly knows where to start."

== Formats and track listings ==
CD Single

1. "Gringo" (Extended Mix) – 5:04
2. "Gringo" (Club Mix) – 5:27
3. "Gringo" (New Age Mix) – 3:45
4. "Gringo" (In the House) – 2:51
5. "Gringo" – 3:55

7" Single

1. "Gringo" – 3:55
2. "Gringo" (New Age Mix) – 3:45

12" Single

1. "Gringo" (Extended Mix) – 5:04
2. "Gringo" (Club Mix) – 5:27
3. "Gringo" (In the House) – 2:51
4. "Gringo" – 3:55

== Charts ==
Chart performance for "Gringo"
Chart (1989)	Peak position
Finland (Suomen virallinen lista)	16
Italy (Musica e dischi)	12
Spain (AFYVE)	10
UK Singles (OCC)	95
