= Sabrina Salerno =

Italian singer (born 1968)

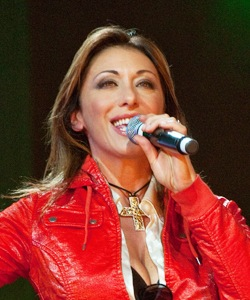
- Salerno performing in Moscow, 2010
- Born: Sabrina Debora Salerno; 15 March 1968 (age 58); Genoa, Liguria, Italy
- Other name: Sabrina
- Occupations: Singer; songwriter; actress; model; television host
- Years active: 1986–present
- Spouse: Enrico Monti (m. 2006)
- Children: 1
- Musical career
- Genres: Italo disco; hi-NRG; Eurobeat; dance-pop; pop; freestyle
- Instrument: Vocals
- Labels: Casablanca; Five; Videogram; RTI Music
- Website: sabrinasalerno.com

Sabrina Debora Salerno (Italian pronunciation: [saˈbriːna ˈdɛːbora saˈlɛrno]; born 15 March 1968), known mononymously as Sabrina, is an Italian singer, songwriter, model, actress and television presenter.

During her career, she has had ten international hits, including three number ones. Internationally, she is best known for her 1987 single "Boys (Summertime Love)", which topped the charts in France and Switzerland and peaked at No. 3 in the United Kingdom. The song was accompanied by a music video that established Sabrina's image as a sex symbol. Her other popular recordings include "All of Me (Boy Oh Boy)", "My Chico", "Like a Yo-Yo", "Gringo", "Siamo donne" and a cover version of "Call Me".

== Early life ==
Sabrina was brought up by her aunt in Genoa before moving to live with her grandparents in Sanremo. She went to live with her mother when she was 15. She sang in the choir at her local Catholic church, and at school she formed a pop group with her friends.

== Career ==
=== 1980s ===
After winning a beauty contest in her native region, Liguria, Sabrina started modeling, and in 1984 she made her television debut on the Italian prime time show Premiatissima on Canale 5. In 1986, her debut single "Sexy Girl", sung in English, was released. Produced by Claudio Cecchetto, it became a top 20 hit in Italy and was a modest international success. In late 1987, she released her first studio album, Sabrina, which was entirely sung in English. In addition to "Sexy Girl", the album included her international breakthrough hit "Boys (Summertime Love)", which reached No. 1 in both in France and Switzerland and the top 5 in more than ten other countries, and "Hot Girl", a top 20 hit in some European countries. "Boys" also gained popularity for its video, which included suggestive scenes of Sabrina dancing in a bikini that occasionally slipped down to reveal part of her nipples. The song has sold more than 1.5 million copies worldwide.

In 1988, Sabrina received the "Best European Singer" award during the Festivalbar event. She also enjoyed another European-wide summer hit with the single "All of Me (Boy Oh Boy)", produced by Stock Aitken Waterman. Matt Aitken praised Sabrina's performance in the studio, saying "as a singer she was pretty decent," but noted her modest clothing during the session "did not fulfill the promise that was expected." He expressed some disappointment over the song's chart performance relative to the success of "Boys", noting that "maybe the shock value was gone, or maybe they didn't shoot the right scene in the swimming pool for the video."

Sabrina released her second studio album, Super Sabrina, later that year, and she maintained her image as a European sex symbol thanks to the videos that accompanied hits such as "My Chico" (her highest-charting single in Italy) and "Like a Yo-Yo", produced by Giorgio Moroder. The latter became the musical theme of Odiens, a popular Italian prime time TV show in which Sabrina also appeared. Sabrina performed in many European countries, including the Montreux Jazz Festival in 1988 and at the Olympic Stadium in Moscow, Russia, in 1989, where 50,000 people gathered over three days to see her perform. She starred in a risqué self-titled video game for home computers. In 1989, she starred in the Italian comedy film Fratelli d'Italia, directed by Neri Parenti, alongside Christian De Sica, Jerry Calà, and Massimo Boldi. She also released a new single, "Gringo", to moderate success and her first remix album called Super Remix.

=== 1990s ===
In 1990, Sabrina was the hostess of the weekly prime time TV show Ricomincio da 2 with Raffaella Carrà on Rai 2, and released a new single called "Yeah Yeah", which reached No. 21 in Italy. The following year, Sabrina recorded "Siamo donne" with Italian singer Jo Squillo, her first release in Italian, which they performed together at 1991's Sanremo Music Festival. Sabrina's third studio album, Over the Pop, was released the same year, and for the first time she was allowed to co-write and co-produce some of the songs. Sabrina's desire for independence and distance from her glamour career led to a conflict with her management. As a result, the promotion of the album suffered and both the album and the follow-up single "Shadows of the Night" were commercial failures. After the failure of the third single "Cover Model", Sabrina parted ways with her label and management.

Throughout 1994 and 1995 several singles appeared, including "Angel Boy", which reached No. 15 in Finland, and a new version of "Boys". In 1996, she established her own recording studio in Treviso with her future husband Enrico Monti and released her first Italian language album, Maschio dove sei, which showcased a pop rock sound. The album and its two singles, "Fatta e rifatta" and the title track, received some critical acclaim but were commercial failures. The album would be re-released the following year as Numeri, featuring a new title song. Sabrina featured in several theatre plays including the comedies I cavalieri della Tavola Rotonda and Uomini sull'orlo di una crisi di nervi.

Sabrina continued to host several TV shows, including the game show Il mercante in fiera and Cocco di mamma on Rai 1. In 1999, Sabrina released a new album, A Flower's Broken. Although the music video accompanying the song "I Love You" sparked some interest, both the album and the single were unsuccessful, largely due to the dissolution of her label RTI Music. Sabrina appeared on the British TV show Eurotrash and performed "I Love You".

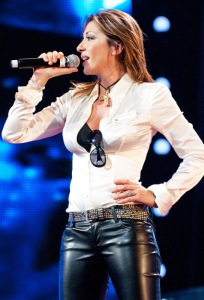
Sabrina performing live in Moscow, Russia, 2010

=== 2000s ===
2001 saw her return to theatre with the musical Emozioni alongside Vladimir Luxuria. A year later she hosted the television show on Italia 1 called Matricole & Meteore. In 2005, she starred in the independent film Colori which premiered at Salerno's Independent Cinema Festival, where she won the Critics' Choice Award for Best Actress. In November of that year, Sabrina performed at the nostalgia concert Diskoteka 80-kh in Russia. The following year, she premiered a new song called "I Feel Love (Good Sensation)" on her website.

In 2007, Sabrina toured France and published a cover version of the disco classic "Born to Be Alive" on her Myspace page. In 2008, she toured France again with the nostalgia tour RFM Party 80, organized by the French radio network RFM. She also performed at another '80s revival concert that was part of the Sopot Festival in Poland with Kim Wilde, Samantha Fox, Sandra, Thomas Anders (ex-Modern Talking), Limahl and Shakin' Stevens. In October 2008, Sabrina released a double album called Erase/Rewind Official Remix, which included new versions of her old hits and several new tracks and cover versions.

=== 2010s ===
In 2010, Sabrina and English singer Samantha Fox released a cover version of Blondie's hit "Call Me" as a duet. The single peaked at No. 4 on the Italian Dance Singles Sales Chart. During the summer of 2010 she hosted the prime-time TV show Mitici 80 on Italia 1. In 2012, Sabrina starred as herself in the French movie Stars 80, directed by Frédéric Forestier and produced by Thomas Langmann, and was on another RFM tour in France. In 2013, Sabrina featured on Neon Neon's song "Shopping (I Like To)" from the duo's second studio album Praxis Makes Perfect. During March and April 2014, Sabrina performed with and mentored a dance group called LECCEzione on Rai 1 prime-time TV show La Pista. In June, she released a Rick Nowels-produced single called "Colour Me", written and co-produced by Sabrina herself.

In 2015, she released a French cover of 1986 song "Ouragan" by Stephanie. In 2018, she released a new single called "Voices".

=== 2020s ===
On 18 September 2024, Sabrina announced she had had surgery to remove a malignant node related to breast cancer.

== Discography ==
- Sabrina (1987)
- Super Sabrina (1988)
- Over the Pop (1991)
- Maschio dove sei (1996)
- A Flower's Broken (1999)
- Erase/Rewind Official Remix (2008)

== Filmography ==
=== Film ===
Year	Title	Role	Notes
1986	Grandi magazzini	The Thief	
1987	Delirium	Sabrina	
1989	Fratelli d'Italia	Michela Sauli	
1998	Jolly Blu	Annabella	
2004	Colori	Mother	
2006	Film D	Sara	
2012	Stars 80	Sabrina	
2019	Modalità aereo	Herself	

=== Television ===
Year	Title	Role	Notes
1986	Ferragosto O.K.	Guendalina	Television movie
1987	Professione vacanze	Mia Star	TV series
1987	Tutti in palestra	Sabrina	TV series
1998	Tutti gli uomini sono uguali	Vittoria	TV series
