= Sexy Girl (Sabrina song) =

- 7" Italian single

Single by Sabrina

from the album Sabrina
- Released: August 1986; 19 September 1988 (remixed version)
- Recorded: April 1986
- Genre: Italo disco
- Length: 3:25
- Label: Chic Records
- Songwriters: M.Bonsanto, R.Rossi, N. Hackett
- Producers: Claudio Cecchetto, mixed by M. Bonsanto and R. Rossi

Sabrina singles chronology
"Sexy Girl" (1986)	"Lady Marmalade" (1987)

Audio video
- "Sexy Girl" on YouTube

"Sexy Girl" is a song by Italian pop singer Sabrina. It was released in August 1986 by Baby Records as the first single from her debut album Sabrina. Produced by Claudio Cecchetto, the song became a top 20 hit in her native Italy and was also successful two years later as a remixed version in Finland.

== Formats and track listings ==
7" single

1. "Sexy Girl" – 3:20
2. "Sexy Girl" (instrumental) – 5:00

12" maxi

1. "Sexy Girl" (long version) – 7:03
2. "Sexy Girl" (instrumental dance) – 6:00

12" maxi – Remixes

1. "Sexy Girl" (remix) – 5:30
2. "Sexy Girl" (club mix) – 4:00
3. "Sexy Girl" (USA radio version) – 3:40

CD maxi

1. "Sexy Girl" (long version) – 7:03
2. "Sexy Girl" (instrumental dance) – 6:00
3. "Sexy Girl" (remix) – 5:30

== Credits ==
- Written by Matteo Bonsanto, N. Hackett and Roberto Rossi
- Photography by Fabio Nosotti
- Artwork by and "Sexy Girl" logo designed by Massimo Capozzi
- Remixes by Ma-Ma, Walter Biondi and Jay Burnett
- Executive produced by Matteo Bonsanto and Roberto Rossi
- Produced by Claudio Cecchetto

== Charts ==
1986 chart performance for "Sexy Girl"
Chart (1986)	Peak position
Italy (Musica e dischi)	20

1988 chart performance for "Sexy Girl"
Chart (1988)	Peak position
Australia (ARIA)	36
Finland (Suomen virallinen lista) The Sexy Girl Mix for Boys & Hot Girls	14
