= All of Me (Boy Oh Boy) =

1988 single by Sabrina

Single by Sabrina

from the album Super Sabrina
- Released: July 1988; 19 September 1988 (UK)
- Recorded: 1987
- Genre: Italo disco; Hi-NRG
- Length: 3:58
- Label: Metronome
- Songwriter: Stock Aitken Waterman
- Producer: Stock Aitken Waterman

Sabrina singles chronology
"Hot Girl" (1987)	"All of Me (Boy Oh Boy)" (1988)	"My Chico" (1988)

Alternative Cover
- UK cover

Audio video
- "All of Me" on YouTube

"All Of Me (Boy Oh Boy)" is a song by the Italian singer Sabrina, released in Italy in July 1988 by Metronome as the first single from her second album, Super Sabrina (1988). It was also her fifth international single. Written and produced by Stock Aitken Waterman (SAW), it followed her previous single "Hot Girl" in Europe, while it was her second single release in the United Kingdom, following "Boys (Summertime Love)". Entering the charts in mid-summer 1988, the single became Sabrina's third major European hit. It followed Sabrina's two previous singles into the top ten or top 20 in several European countries, and reached the top 30 of the UK Singles Chart.

== Background and writing ==
Written and produced by Stock Aitken & Waterman, the song is a typical dance-pop record of the SAW stable. "It was fun working with them", Sabrina said. "They don't waste time. They like to get the job done with. Of course, I had heard of them before and I liked a lot of the records they did. I have heard a lot of people say they don't like them but I think these people are jealous." Matt Aitken praised Sabrina's performance in the studio, saying "as a singer she was pretty decent", but noted her modest clothing during the session "did not fulfil the promise that was expected." Written especially for Sabrina, the lyrics, production and melody are slightly reminiscent of Sabrina's single "Boys": the structure of the introductions are similar and while the chorus in "Boys" is built around the phrase 'Boys, boys, boys', in "All of Me" it is 'Boy, oh, boy'.

== Critical reception ==
Pan-European magazine Music & Media wrote, "A killing combination of Sabrina and SAW on a jaunty, perky little number. Definitive Euro-disco." Jack Barron from NME said, "More SAW-ing production stuff. A song of fidelity from Sabrina — an impossibility surely? — and consequently not a G-string on the superb 'Boys (Summertime Love)'."

In 2017, Christian Guiltenane of British magazine Attitude described the song as "a mindless hiNRG romp, complete with relentless bassline, insanely catchy chorus and a camptastic video" and "a delicious guilty pleasure". In 2021, Classic Pop magazine ranked "All of Me (Boy Oh Boy)" number 39 in their list of the "Top 40 Stock Aitken Waterman Songs", noting that "the Italo disco feel is pronounced" on this song, that "[Sabrina] is Italian, so it made complete sense for SAW to go in that direction for this creation, written specifically with her in mind" and concluded that British people "fell for her neon spandex looks and hooky melodies too".

== Chart performance ==
In the United Kingdom, "All of Me (Boy Oh Boy)" started at number 51 on 1 October 1988 and reached a peak of number 25 three weeks later, staying on the chart for a total of seven weeks. In West Germany, it rocketed from number 74 to number 17 in its third week, but was unable to go higher than number 16, a position it reached on 15 August 1988; its chart trajectory counted 14 weeks. In France, it spent nine weeks on the top 50 before culminating at number 15, and eventually totaled 15 weeks of presence. In addition, it was a number-two hit in Finland, a top-12 hit in Switzerland and Italy, and peaked within the top ten in Denmark. On the overall Eurochart Hot 100 Singles, it entered at number 31 on 6 August 1988, peaked at number 24 in its fourth week, and spent a total of 16 weeks in the top 100.

Aitken expressed disappointment over the song's chart performance relative to "Boys (Summertime Love)", musing that "maybe the shock value was gone, or maybe they didn't shoot the right scene in the swimming pool for the video."

== Music video ==
Sabrina in the Italian version of the music video for "All of Me (Boy Oh Boy)"

Two music videos were filmed for the single—one by Sabrina's Italian team/label to coincide with the single's early European release, and one made later by her UK label for the single's UK release. In the European version of the video, she is seen playing a Dynacord Rhythm Stick.

== Track listings ==
- 7-inch single
1. "All of Me (Boy Oh Boy)" – 3:58
2. "All of Me (Boy Oh Boy)" (instrumental) – 4:29
- 12-inch single
1. "All of Me (Boy Oh Boy)" (extended mix) – 5:15
2. "All of Me (Boy Oh Boy)" (instrumental) – 4:29
3. "All of Me (Boy Oh Boy)" – 3:58
- 12-inch remix
1. "All of Me (Boy Oh Boy)" (Boy Oh Boy Mix) – 6:06
2. "All of Me (Boy Oh Boy)" (instrumental) – 4:29
3. "All of Me (Boy Oh Boy)" – 3:58
- CD single
1. "All of Me (Boy Oh Boy)" (extended mix) – 5:15
2. "All of Me (Boy Oh Boy)" (instrumental) – 4:29
3. "All of Me (Boy Oh Boy)" – 3:58

== Charts ==
=== Weekly charts ===
Weekly chart performance for "All of Me (Boy Oh Boy)"
Chart (1988)	Peak position
Denmark (IFPI)	9 (Note: The exact peak position in Denmark is unknown. The single reached at least number 9, as Music & Media provided the single's ranking only for that week, but it did not reach the top three, given every week by the magazine.)
Europe (Eurochart Hot 100 Singles)	24
Finland (Suomen virallinen lista)	2
France (SNEP)	15
Italy (Musica e dischi)	12
Luxembourg (Radio Luxembourg)	14
Netherlands (Single Top 100)	90
Switzerland (Schweizer Hitparade)	12
UK Singles (OCC)	25
UK Dance (Music Week)	20
West Germany (GfK)	16

=== Year-end charts ===
Year-end chart performance for "All of Me (Boy Oh Boy)"
Chart (1988)	Position
Europe (Eurochart Hot 100 Singles)	86
