= Boys (Summertime Love) =

1987 single by Sabrina

Single by Sabrina

from the album Sabrina
- B-side: "Get Ready (Holiday Rock)"
- Released: 1987
- Genre: Italo disco
- Length: 3:55
- Label: Baby
- Songwriters: Matteo Bonsanto; Roberto Rossi; Malcom Charlton; Claudio Cecchetto
- Producer: Claudio Cecchetto

Sabrina singles chronology
"Lady Marmalade" (1987)	"Boys (Summertime Love)" (1987)	"Hot Girl" (1987)

Audio only
- "Boys (Summertime Love)" on YouTube

"Boys (Summertime Love)" is a song by the Italian singer Sabrina Salerno, released in May 1987 by Baby Records as the third single from her debut studio album Sabrina (1987). The song topped the charts in France (where it became the first number-one single by an Italian singer since 1984), Israel and Switzerland, while peaking within the top five entries in Austria, Belgium, Finland, West Germany, Ireland, the Netherlands, Norway, Spain, and Sweden.

It was Sabrina's first single to be released in the United Kingdom, reaching number three on the UK singles chart in June 1988. Outside Europe, "Boys (Summertime Love)" peaked at number 11 in Australia and number six in South Africa.

A remixed version was released only in France, retitled as "Boys '95" in 1995, and in 2003 as "Boys Boys Boys (The Dance Remixes)".

== Critical reception ==
William Shaw from Smash Hits wrote that Sabrina "sings a rather nicely inane tune about boys which jigs about infectiously enough as eurodisco tunes invariably do, but which is somewhat marred by the fact that it's all about hanging around on the beach in the summertime, which is rather inappropriate in January." Another editor, Richard Lowe, said, "Well, it's another brilliantly tragic disco record and if it's not a hit this summer after spurring millions of people to make buffoons of themselves in discos while on 'vacation' I'll eat my hat." In his review published in Record Mirror, James Hamilton described the song as a "plaintively squawked simple sing-song 120bpm Eurobeat canterer from Italy".

== Music video ==
Sabrina in the music video for "Boys (Summertime Love)"

The accompanying music video for "Boys (Summertime Love)" was filmed at the Florida hotel in Jesolo, Italy. In it, Sabrina splashes about in a swimming pool, while her bikini top keeps sliding down, thus repeatedly revealing varying amounts of her nipples. As a result, the BBC added black bars around the image when the video was aired on Top of the Pops (TOTP) in June 1988, effectively cropping it into widescreen. It remains one of the most downloaded video clips on the Internet.

== Track listings ==
- 7-inch single

A. "Boys (Summertime Love)" – 3:56
B. "Get Ready (Holiday Rock)" – 3:20

- Dutch 7-inch single

A. "Boys (Summertime Love)" – 3:30
B. "Get Ready (Holiday Rock)" – 3:30

- 12-inch single

A. "Boys (Summertime Love)" – 5:30
B. "Boys (Summertime Love)" (dub version) – 5:35

- German 12-inch single – Remixed

A. "Boys (Summertime Love)" (remix by Wally Brill) – 8:43
B. "Boys (Summertime Love)" (dub version) – 5:40

- UK and Australian 12-inch single

A. "Boys (Summertime Love)" – 5:40
B1. "Boys (Summertime Love)" (dub version) – 5:40
B2. "Get Ready (Holiday Rock)" – 3:30

- French CD single
1. "Boys (Summertime Love)" – 3:50
2. "Boys (Summertime Love)" (remix) – 5:40
3. "Hot Girl" – 3:22
- 12-inch single – Remix by Pete Hammond

A. "Boys (Summertime Love)" (remix by Pete Hammond) – 7:01
B1. "Boys (Summertime Love)" (dub version) – 5:35
B2. "Get Ready (Holiday Rock)" – 3:20

- US and Canadian 12-inch single

A1. "Boys (Summertime Love)" (12″ version) – 7:01
A2. "Boys (Summertime Love)" (7″ version) – 3:50
B1. "Boys (Summertime Love)" (Summertime mix) – 5:40
B2. "Boys (Summertime Love)" (dub) – 5:40
B3. "Get Ready (Holiday Rock)" – 3:30

- French CD single (1995)
1. "Boys" (Radio Lovers remix) – 5:36
2. "Boys" (N.Y.D.P. mix) – 3:40
- French 12-inch single (1995)

A1. "Boys" (Radio Lovers remix) – 5:36
A2. "Boys" (N.Y.D.P. mix) – 3:40
B1. "Boys" (Chorus remix) – 5:35
B2. "Boys" (Only Music remix) – 5:35

- German 12-inch single – The Dance Remixes (2003)

A. "Boys (Summertime Love)" (Renegade Master's remix) – 6:38
B1. "Boys (Summertime Love)" (Doug Laurent remix) – 5:08
B2. "Boys (Summertime Love)" (Future Shock Less Vocal mix) – 5:08

== Charts ==
=== Weekly charts ===
1987–1988 weekly chart performance for "Boys (Summertime Love)"
Chart (1987–1988)	Peak position
Australia (ARIA)	11
Austria (Ö3 Austria Top 40)	5
Belgium (Ultratop 50 Flanders)	2
Canada Dance/Urban (RPM)	2
Europe (European Hot 100 Singles)	3
Finland (Suomen virallinen lista)	2
France (SNEP)	1
Greece (IFPI)	2
Ireland (IRMA)	3
Israel (Israeli Singles Chart)	1
Italy (Musica e dischi)	5
Luxembourg (Radio Luxembourg)	3
Netherlands (Dutch Top 40)	5
Netherlands (Single Top 100)	4
Norway (VG-lista)	3
Portugal (AFP)	3
South Africa (Springbok Radio)	6
Spain (AFYVE)	3
Sweden (Sverigetopplistan)	5
Switzerland (Schweizer Hitparade)	1
UK Singles (Official Charts)	3
UK Dance (Music Week)	4
West Germany (GfK)	2

2025 weekly chart performance for "Boys (Summertime Love)"
Chart (2025)	Peak position
Lithuania Airplay (TopHit)	5

2026 weekly chart performance for "Boys Boys Boys" (Tony Sanders featuring Loren Santi version)
Chart (2026)	Peak position
Ukraine Airplay (TopHit)	71

=== Monthly charts ===
2025 monthly chart performance for "Boys (Summertime Love)"
Chart (2025)	Peak position
Lithuania Airplay (TopHit)	8

2026 monthly chart performance for "Boys Boys Boys" (Tony Sanders featuring Loren Santi version)
Chart (2026)	Peak position
Ukraine Airplay (TopHit)	69

=== Year-end charts ===
1987 year-end chart performance for "Boys (Summertime Love)"
Chart (1987)	Position
Belgium (Ultratop 50 Flanders)	18
Europe (European Hot 100 Singles)	52
Netherlands (Dutch Top 40)	36
Netherlands (Single Top 100)	36
Switzerland (Schweizer Hitparade)	7
West Germany (Media Control)	24

1988 year-end chart performance for "Boys (Summertime Love)"
Chart (1988)	Position
Australia (ARIA)	41
Canada Dance/Urban (RPM)	11
Europe (European Hot 100 Singles)	13
UK Singles (Gallup)	35
UK Dance (Music Week)	15

== Certifications ==
Certifications for "Boys (Summertime Love)"
Region	Certification	Certified units/sales
France (SNEP)	Gold	500,000^{*}
Germany (BVMI)	Gold	500,000^{^}
United Kingdom (BPI)	Gold	500,000^{^}
^{*} Sales figures based on certification alone.^{^} Shipments figures based on certification alone.

== Other versions ==
In 1988, Japanese TV personality Aya Sugimoto released a cover version of the song in Japanese. In 2006, the song was covered by Iranian-Norwegian professional poker player and former nude model Aylar Lie. Dutch gay dance music band Bearforce 1 made a cover of the song in 2008, including the chorus of "Boys (Summertime Love)". Its music video features four men dancing to the song and lip syncing.

== See also ==
- List of number-one singles of 1988 (France)
