= 1988 in Italian television =

This is a list of Italian television related events from 1988.

== Events ==
=== Rai ===
- 27 February: Massimo Ranieri wins the Sanremo Festival, hosted by Miguel Bosè and Gabriella Carlucci, with Perdere l’amore.
- 6 May. On an episode of the magazine Telefono giallo, hosted by Corrado Augias, about the Itavia flight 870, an airman in service in Marsala on the day of the crash (whose identity has never been ascertained), phones on air and declares to have seen the radar tracks of the event, before they were hidden by the Italian Air Force.
- 22 June: the Italy-USSR semi-final of UEFA Euro 1988 is the most watched program of the year, with 19 million viewers.
- 20 June: RAI 2 broadcasts the last episode of Capitol, followed by a special, by film critic Claudio G. Fava, with interviews to actors, authors and Italian voice actors. The soap, abruptly interrupted due to its low ratings in America, still had an average of five million viewers in Italy.
- 17 September: RAI broadcasts (late at night, due to the time difference) the opening ceremony of the Seoul Olympics. In the following two weeks, the state TV gives very ample space to the games (247 hours only on RAI 2). Yet, for the first time, it had to suffer competition from TMC and moreover from TV Capodistria, which for two weeks dedicates its entire programming to the event.
- 27 December: a planned interview to Indro Montanelli on Domenica in is judged inappropriate and cancelled because the journalist is engaged in a controversy with Prime Minister Ciriaco De Mita, whom he called “a godfather". Enrico Manca hoimself, RAI president, defines the act of censorship as "a macroscopic error".

=== Fininvest ===
- 22 February: Silvio Berlusconi stops the airing of the satirical variety Matrjoska by Antonio Ricci. The censorship is motivated by the full frontals of Moana Pozzi, by a sketch judged too vulgar, with the extraterrestrial Scrondo, and by the filming of the Communion and Liberation choir, carried out without a written consent. Antonio Ricci presents his resignation from Fininvest, fast withdrawn. The program is broadcast, in a softer version and with the title The Arab Phoenix, two months later.
- 20 June: the De Mita government approves the decree of the Minister of Communications Oscar Mammì regulating private television. A single television operator may not own more than three national channels. The planned “zero option”, prohibiting newspaper owners (such as Berlusconi) from also owning televisions, is instead set aside.
- 14 July: the Constitutional Court recognizes the right of private networks to broadcast on a national scale; at the same time, it invites the legislator to regulate the matter and declares that the duopoly between a public and a private company does not guarantee pluralism.
- 3 October: on Rete 4, Dentro la notizia, the first Finivest newscast, is aired; it is hosted by Rita Dalla Chiesa and Alessandro Cecchi Paone. The program can boast renowned collaborators, from Enrico Letta to Giorgio Bocca, from Enzo Bettiza to Gianni Brera, but is penalized by the lack of live broadcasting.

=== Other private channels ===
- 18 February: birth of the syndication Cinque Stelle, presided by the Catholic priest and journalist Tommaso Mastrandea.
- 1 May: birth of the syndication Supersix, presided by Gianni Ferrauto.
- 21 May: birth of the national network Retemia, with seat in Lucca and owned by the financier and former telemarketer Giorgio Mendella. It dedicates 13 hours a day to teleshopping and promoting of financial investments, the rest to entertainment and information (care of Ruggero Orlando).

== Awards ==
5. Telegatto Award, for the season 1987–1988.

- Man and woman of the year: Renzo Arbore and Loretta Goggi ; Giuliano Ferrara as revelation of the year.
- Best tv show :Indietro tutta and Tra moglie e marito (as revelation show).
- Best TV movie: Un bambino di nome Gesù (for Italy) and She Stood Alone: The Tailhook Scandal (for abroad).
- Best serial: I ragazzi della 3. C (for Italy) and Dynasty (for abroad).
- Best miniseries: The secret of the Sahara (for Italy) and The fortunate Pilgrim (for abroad)
- Best soap opera: Guiding light.
- Best spot: WWF.
- Best quiz: Telemike.
- Best variety: Domenica In.
- Best talk show: Maurizio Costanzo show
- Best educational: Il mondo di Quark.
- Best magazine: Il caso and Gli intoccabili
- Best music show: 38. Sanremo Festival.
- Best sport magazine: La domenica sportiva.
- Best show for children: Bim bum bam.
- Awards for the foreign TV: Marlene Jobert (France), Art Malik (UK), Victoria Abril (Spain), Klaus Wennemann (Germany).
- Special award: Mrs. Barbara Tosi (reader of Sorrisi e canzoni TV),

== Debuts ==
=== RAI ===
==== Variety ====
- Mezzanotte e dintorni (Round midnight) – night talk show, hosted by Gigi Marzullo; again on air. Despite the irony of the critics for its alleged banality, it has got 38 editions and 4 spin-offs.
- La tv delle ragazze (Girls TV) – satirical variety, hosted by Serena Dandini, written, directed and interpreted exclusively by women (save two male actors in minor roles); 2 seasons. It launches several comic actresses, as Monica Scattini and Angela Finocchiaro.
- Europa Europa – variety with Farizio Frizzi and Elisabetta Gardini, aimed to propagandize the European Union; 3 seasons.
- Videocomic – anthology of comic sketches from the RAI archives, care of Nicoletta Leggeri, lasted till 2021.
- Buona fortuna (Good luck) – talent show for amateur, with Elisabetta Gardini and then Claudio Lippi; 2 seasons.
- Cocco – summer show hosted by Gabriella Carlucci; 2 seasons.
- Conto su di te (I trust you) – game show hosted by Jocelyn Hattab; 2 seasons.
- Notte rock (Rock night) – music magazine, care of Cesare Pierleoni; lasted till 1994.

==== News and educational ====
- Schegge (Splinters) – anthology of excerpts from the RAI archive, care of Enrico Ghezzi and Marco Giusti, lasted till 1995.
- Fuori orario (After hours. [Un]seen things) – care of Enrico Ghezzi ; again on air. Initially it’s a cultural talk-show with an experimental formula. From the second season it becomes the night space of Rai 3 dedicated to auteur cinema; the presentations of films by Ghezzi become infamous, for their cryptic and abstruse language.
- Alla ricerca dell’arca (Looking for the ark) – adventure and travels magazine, hosted by Mino Damato; 3 seasons.
- Publimania – night anthology of advertising from the world ; 4 seasons.
- Videobox (or Spettabile RAI) – program of letters from the public to RAI, videorecorded at the Rizzoli bookstore in Milan; 2 seasons.
- TG 2 motori – magazine about cars; again on air.

==== For children ====
- Big – segmented show with cartoons, games and magazines, included a news program for the youngest ones; 7 seasons.

=== Mediaset ===
==== Serials ====
- Casa Vianello (Vianello house) – sitcom with Raimondo Vianello and Sandra Mondaini; 16 seasons. The two actors play themselves, as two aged spouses, deeply united despite their perennial quarrels and his amorous adventures.
- Don Tonino – detective comedy with Gigi e Andrea as a funny couple of investigators (a policeman and a priest); 2 seasons.

==== Variety ====
- Striscia la notizia (The news crawls) – satirical news program, ideated by Antonio Ricci and again on air; irreverent comical sketches, played in studio by two fake news readers, alternate with more serious reportages about social issues. The show gets, for decades, the greatest audience in the Italian television and has got by the critics praises, but also charges of demagogy and sexism, for the intensive use of girls in sexy suits (the “velinas”). Among the many hosts of the program, the most successful had been the couple Ezio Greggio-Enzo Iachetti, while its most popular reporter is the puppet Gabibbo.
- Dibattito! – parodistic talk-show, hosted by Gianni Ippoliti, whose guests are, willingly, average people without any competence about the matters debated, 2 seasons.
- Il gioco dei nove – game show, Italian version of Holywood Squares, hosted by Raimondo Vianello, later by Gerry Scotti; 5 seasons.
- Cari genitori (Dear parents) – game show with Enrica Bomnaccorti and then Sandra Milo, applying the format of The Newlywed Game to couple of parents and sons; 4 seasons.

=== Other channels ===
- TV Donna – interstitial program, hosted by Carla Urban; lasted till 1993 (TMC).
- WIP – World inportant person – magazine hosted by Andra Michelozzi, that includes interviews to international personalities as Helmut Kohl and George H- W. Bush; lasted till 1990 (Retemia).

=== International ===
- March - (United States) The Green Hornet (Rai 1) (1966-1967)
- 2 March - (United States) BraveStarr (Italia 1) (1987-1988)
- September - (Spain) Bobobobs (Italia 1) (1988-1989)
- 17 September - (United States) Jake and the Fatman (Canale 5) (1987-1992)
- (Spain) Wisdom of the Gnomes (Italia 1) (1987-1988)
- (Japan) Calimero (Rai 1) (1972-1975)
- (United States) Kissyfur (Rai 2) (1986-1990)
- (United States) Beauty and the Beast (Italia 1) (1987-1990)
- (United States) My Little Pony (Italia 1) (1984-1987)
- (United States) L.A. Law (Rai 1) (1986-1994)
- (United States) Laverne & Shirley (Canale 5) (1976-1983)
- (United States) Perfect Strangers (Canale 5) (1986-1993)
- (Japan) Maho no Mako-chan (Italia 1) (1970-1971)
- (United States) Lady Lovely Locks (Italia 1) (1987-1988)
- (United Kingdom) C.A.T.S. Eyes (Rai 1) (1985-1987)
- (United States) Meatballs & Spaghetti (Rai 1) (1982-1983)
- (United States) Matlock (TMC) (1986-1995)
- (United States) / (France) / (Canada) / (Japan) The Littles (Canale 5) (1983-1985)
- (United States) Teenage Mutant Ninja Turtles (Italia 7) (1987-1996)
- (United States) BraveStarr (Italia 1) (1987-1988)
- (United States) Down and Out in Beverly Hills (Rai 1) (1987)
- (United States) Moncchichis (Rai 1) (1983)
- (United States) Beverly Hills Teens (Italia 1) (1987)
- (United States) The Flintstone Kids (Rai 2) (1986-1988)
- (United States) ALF (Rai 2) (1986-1990)
- (United States) MacGyver (Italia 1) (1985-1992)

== Television shows ==
=== RAI ===
==== Drama ====
- Gli angeli del potere (The power’s angles) – directed and interpreted by Giorgio Albertazzi, from the Pavel Kohout's drama about the Prague Spring Maria's Struggle with the Angels, with Jitka Frantová.
- L’altro enigma by Vittorio Gassmann and Carlo Tuzii, from Pier Paolo Pasolini's piece Affabulazione, about the Oedipus complex, with Vittorio and Alessandro Gassmann.
- Lenin... the train – by Damiano Damiani, with Ben Kingsley (Lenin), Leslie Caron (Nadezhda Krupskaya) and Dominique Sanda (Inessa Armand), script by Enzo Bettiza; in 2 episodes. Reconstruction of the Lenin’s trip on the sealed train.
- La coscienza di Zeno (Zeno's conscience) – by Sandro Bolchi, from the Italo Svevo’s novel, script by Tullio Kezich, with Johnny Dorelli (in an unusual dramatic role) and Ottavia Piccolo; in 2 episodes.
- Silvia è sola (Silvia is alone) by Silvio Maestranzi, with Marina Malfatti; drama about female alcoholism.

==== Comedy ====
- Piazza Navona – cycle of 6 comedy TV-movies, realized by 6 debuting directors (Ricky Tognazzi among others) and produced and supervised by Ettore Scola; every episode takes place in the Roman square over the course of a day and includes a cameo of Marcello Mastroianni as himself.
- ... e non se ne vogliono andare (They don’t want to leave home) – family comedy by Giorgio Capitani, with Turi Ferro and Virna Lisi as an aged couple with three sons, adult but clingy to the family. The movie gets grat public success and a sequel.
- Un milione di miliardi (A million of billions) by Gianfranco Albano, with Johnny Dorelli; a divorced father meets his son for the first time; coproduced with Germany.

==== Miniseries ====
- The secret of the Sahara – by Alberto Negrin, with Andie MacDowell and Michael York, music by Ennio Morricone; 4 episodes. European coproduction inspired by Emilio Salgari and (uncredited) Pierre Benoit’s Atlantida.
- La piovra 4 – by Luigi Perelli, with Michele Placido, Patricia Millardet and Remo Girone; 6 episodes. The final chapter, where the hero of the series, the superintendent Corrado Cattani, is killed by the Mafia, gets 17 million viewers (score no more reached by any Italian fiction).
- Quando ancora non c’erano i Beatles (Before the Beatles) – by Marcello Aliprandi, with Lucrezia Lante della Rovere ; 3 episodes. “Italian graffiti” set in the Romagnol Riviera at the beginning of the Sixties.

==== Serial ====
- Sei delitti per padre Brown (Six crimes for Father Brown) – by Vittorio De Sisti, with Emrys James in the tile role; coproduced with France.
- Diciottenni, Versilia 1966 – teen comedy set in the Sixties with the debuting Margherita Buy.
- Sapore di gloria (Taste of glory) – by Marcello Baldi, with Giulio Base; sporting serial, sponsored by CONI.

==== Variety ====
- Fantastico 9 – with Enrico Montesano and Anna Oxa. After the controversial edition with Celentano, the RAI autumn show returns to a more sober and traditional form.
- Troppo forti (Too strong) –variety about the Italians’ dreams and desires, with Mara Venier (at her TV debut) and Claudio Sorrentino.
- Automia - variety about the cars, with Sandra Milo.
- Carnevale - with Edvige Fenech.
- Cinema che follia! (Cinema, what a madness!) – with Christian De Sica and Daniele Formica; anticipately suspended for low ratings.
- Di che vizio sei? (What’s your vice?) variety about the seven deadly sins, with Gigi Proietti and Milva.
- Fate il vostro gioco (Place your bets) with Fabio Fazio and Elvire Audray.
- Trasmissione forzata (Forced broadcasting) – satirical variety with Dario Fo and Franca Rame (who host a TV show for the first time after controversial Canzonissima 1962), sided by Enzo Jannacci.
- Via Teulada 66 – noon show, hosted by Loretta Goggi.

===== Quiz and game show =====
- Complimenti per la trasmissione (Congratulations for the show) – game show with Piero Chiambretti (at his debut as host of a complete program). A RAI troupe breaks live in the house of an average family and subjects it to various tests; however, the games are just a pretext to show the reactions of the ordinary people to the TV cameras.
- Argento e oro (Silver and gold) - quiz about Twentieth Century history, hosted by Luciano Rispoli.
- Domani sposi (Tomorrow married) – game show, hosted by Giancarlo Magalli, with couples of betrothed as contenders.

==== News and educational ====
- Il testimone (Witness) with Giuliano Ferrara. The program inaugurates in Italy a new formula of TV journalism, with strong elements of infotainment and explicitly partisan (Ferrara is a declared supporter of Bettino Craxi's PSI).
- Io confesso – reality show directed by Paolo Pietrangeli and hosted by Enza Sampò; an anonymous person, the face hidden by a Plexiglas window, reveals his most private secrets.
- A proposito di Roma (About Rome) – by Egidio Eronico, documentary about the urbanistic history of the Italian capital the second afterwar; 3 episodes.

=== Mediaset ===
==== Drama ====
In 1988, Fininvest began to produce, alongside light comedies, also more ambitious fiction, entrusted to prestigious directors.

- Un bambino di nome Gesù (A child called Jesus) – by Franco Rossi, from the Apocriphal Gospels, with the child actor Matteo Beliina (Christ Child) and Bekim Fehmiu (Saint Joseph). It has two sequels (L’attesa, Il mistero).
- Festa di Capodanno (New year’s Eve party) – by Piero Schivazappa, with Johnny Dorelli and Eleonora Goirgi; the unhappy love story between a pianist and a married woman.
- Il vizio di vivere (The vice of living) by Dino Risi, with Carol Alt; Inspired by the true story of Rosanna Benzi, who led an active life even if forced into an iron lung.
- Gli indifferenti - - by Mauro Bolognini, from the Alberto Moravia's novel, with Laura Antonelli, Liv Ullmann and Peter Fonda; coproduced with Great Britain.
- I maestri del thriller, a cycle of horror films, directed by Lucio Fulci (Sodoma's Ghost and Touch of death), Lamberto Bava (Il maestro del terrore), Mario Bianchi (Non aver paura della zia Marta) and Enzo Milioni (Luna di sangue). The films, judged too splatter, are not broadcast and are distributed on videotape only after years.

==== Miniseries ====
- The fortunate pilgrim by Sturat Cooper, from the Mario Puzo's novel, with Sophia Loren; 3 episodes. Coproduced with HBO.
- Due fratelli (Two brothers) by Alberto Lattuada, with Massimo Ghini and Nancy Brilli; 3 episodes. A magistrate investigates a toxic waste trafficking in which his brother too is involved.
- La romana by Giuseppe Patroni Griffi, from The woman of Rome by Alberto Moravia, with Francesca Dellera and Gina Lollobrigida; 3 episodes.
- Colletti bianchi (White collars) by Bruno Cortini, with Giorgio Faletti and Laura Lattuada; the work and love experiences of some Milan clerks.

==== Serials ====
- Zanzibar – situation comedy that transposes the formula of Cheers in a Milan bar; directed by Marco Mattolini, with Claudio Bisio, Gigio Alberti (also authors), Silvio Orlando and Angela Finocchiaro.
- I cinque del quinto piano (The five at the fifth floor) – sit-com about a Milan family, with Gian Franco Bosco (Gian) and Serena Cantalupi.
- Balliamo e cantiamo con Licia (Let’s dance and sing with Licia) – third sequel of Love me Licia.
- Arriva Cristina (Here is Cristina) – spin-off of Love me Licia, aimed to a slightly older public; the bass player of the Bee Hive enters in the band of Cristina D’Avena (playing herself). The serial, despite its naivety, repeats the success of the original and has three sequel.
- Big man – by Steno and others, with Bud Spencer as an insurance detective.
- Helena by Giancarlo Soldi, from the Robin Wood’s comics, with Paola Onofri as a young and idealistic journalist, last role for Renato Rescel.

==== Variety ====
- L’araba fenice (see over), satirical show by Antonio Ricci. Provocatively, the host is Mazouz M'Barek, a Moroccan street vendor without any TV experience; he’s sided by many comic actors, included a debuting Sabrina Guzzanti.
- Odiens - variety by Antonio Ricci, with Ezio Greggio, Gianfranco D’Angelo, Lorella Cuccarini and Sabrina Salerno.
- Raffaella Carrà show –debut of Raffaella Carrà on the Fininvest networks. The show, despite the presence of several international stars, doesn’t get the hoped success.
- Ewiva – with Milly Carlucci; suspended for low ratings after just two episodes.
- 1,2,3... Jovanotti - music show with Jovanotti.
- Mega Salvi show with Francesco Salvi.
- Passiamo la notte insieme (Let’s spend the night together) – dating show, in explicitly erotic key, hosted by Marco Predolin.
- Provini – talent show with Gianni Ippoliti.

== Ending this year ==
- Buongiorno Italia
- Cabaret per una notte
- Chi tiriamo in ballo?
- Drive in
- G. B. Show
- Jeans
- Mare contro mare
- Il miliardario
- Porto matto
- Tivù tivù

== Deaths ==
Date	Name	Age	Cinematic Credibility
7 January	Carlo Hinterman	64	Actor
1 May	Paolo Stoppa	81	Actor
18 May	Enzo Tortora	59	Italian TV host
3 June	Renzo Palmer	57	Actor
2 November	Guido Sacerdote	68	Director of Studio Uno and Canzonissima
2 December	Tata Giacobetti	66	Singer, member of Quartetto Cetra

== See also ==
- List of Italian films of 1988
