= Sanremo Music Festival 1996 =

Italian song contest (46th edition)

Dates and venue
- Semi-final 1: 20 February 1996
- Semi-final 2: 21 February 1996
- Semi-final 3: 22 February 1996
- Semi-final 4: 23 February 1996
- Final: 24 February 1996
- Venue: Teatro Ariston; Sanremo, Italy

Organisation
- Broadcaster: Radiotelevisione italiana (RAI)
- Musical director: Pippo Caruso
- Artistic director: Pippo Baudo
- Presenters: Pippo Baudo and Sabrina Ferilli, Valeria Mazza

Big Artists section
- Number of entries: 23
- Winner: "Vorrei incontrarti fra cent'anni" Ron ft. Tosca

Newcomers' section
- Number of entries: 14
- Winner: "Non ci sto" Syria

The Sanremo Music Festival 1996 (Italian: Festival di Sanremo 1996), officially the 46th Italian Song Festival (46º Festival della canzone italiana), was the 46th annual Sanremo Music Festival, held at the Teatro Ariston in Sanremo in late February 1996 and broadcast by Radiotelevisione italiana (RAI). The show was presented by Pippo Baudo, who also served as the artistic director, with actress Sabrina Ferilli and model Valeria Mazza.

The winners of the Big Artists section were Ron and Tosca with the song "Vorrei incontrarti fra cent'anni", while Syria won the Newcomers section with the song "Non ci sto".

In this edition, the Critics Award was named after Mia Martini, who died the year before and was the first recipient of the award in 1982. It was awarded to the song "La terra dei cachi" by Elio e le Storie Tese.

Bruce Springsteen opened the first night of the festival performing, out of competition, the song "The Ghost of Tom Joad".

After every night Rai 1 broadcast DopoFestival, a talk show about the festival with the participation of singers and journalists. It was hosted by Ambra Angiolini with Luciano De Crescenzo, Roberto D'Agostino, Gianni Ippoliti and Pippo Baudo.

== Participants and results ==
=== Big Artists ===
Big Artists section
Song	Artist(s)	Songwriter(s)	Rank	Notes
"Vorrei incontrarti fra cent'anni"	Ron & Tosca	Rosalino Cellamare	1	Winner of the "Big Artists" section; Volare Award for Best Lyrics; Snac Award for Best Music
"La terra dei cachi"	Elio e le Storie Tese	Davide Civaschi; Stefano Belisari; Sergio Conforti e Nicola Fasani	2	Mia Martini Critics Award
"Strano il mio destino"	Giorgia	Maurizio Fabrizio; Giorgia Todrani	3	
"E io penso a te"	Spagna	Ivana Spagna; Giorgio Spagna	4	
"Mai più sola"	Neri per Caso	Claudio Mattone	5	
"Se adesso te ne vai"	Massimo Di Cataldo	Massimo Di Cataldo; Laurex	6	
"È la mia vita"	Albano Carrisi	Pino Marino; Maurizio Fabrizio	7	
"Soli al bar"	Aleandro Baldi ft. Marco Guerzoni	Francesco Palmieri; Giancarlo Bigazzi; Aleandro Baldi	8	
"Cantare è d'amore"	Amedeo Minghi	Amedeo Minghi; Pasquale Panella	9	
"Volo così"	Paola Turci	Paola Turci; Roberto Casini	10	
"L'elefante e la farfalla"	Michele Zarrillo	Vincenzo Incenzo; Michele Zarrillo	11	
"Il ragazzo con la chitarra"	Luca Barbarossa	Luca Barbarossa	12	
"Sulla porta"	Federico Salvatore	Federico Salvatore; Giancarlo Bigazzi; Giuseppe Dati	13	
"Una vita migliore"	Rossella Marcone	Pietro Cremonesi; Federico Cavalli; Angelo Valsiglio	14	
"L'amore è un attimo"	Enrico Ruggeri	Luigi Schiavone; Enrico Ruggeri	15	
"Sarò"	Raffaella Cavalli	Depsa; Fio Zanotti; Angelo Valsiglio	16	
"Solo lei"	Gigi Finizio	Gigi Finizio; Antonio Annona	17	
"Non andare via"	Paolo Vallesi	Giuseppe Dati; Paolo Vallesi	18	
"Romanzo"	Riccardo Fogli	Guido Morra; Maurizio Fabrizio	19	
"Letti"	New Trolls & Umberto Bindi	Umberto Bindi; Renato Zero	20	Fonopoli Award for Best Arrangement
"Ama"	Dhamm	Dario Benedetti; Alessio Ventura; Mauro Munzi; Massimo Conti	Eliminated	
"Non è amore"	Mara	David Poggiolini; Mike Francis	Eliminated	
"Non scherzare dai"	Fedele Boccassini	Luca Angelosanti; Fio Zanotti; Memo Remigi; Fedele Boccassini; Francesco Morettini	Eliminated	

=== Newcomers ===
Newcomers section
Song	Artist(s)	Songwriter(s)	Rank	Notes
"Non ci sto"	Syria	Claudio Mattone	1	Winner of the Newcomers' section
"Sarò bellissima"	Adriana Ruocco	Franco Migliacci; Stefano Cenci; E. Fratini e L. Silvi	2	
"Al di là di questi anni"	Marina Rei	Frank Minoia; Marina Rei	3	Winner of the Mia Martini Critics Award - Newcomers' section
"Quando ti senti sola"	O.R.O.	Angelo Manfredi; Mario Manzani	4	
"Quando il cuore"	Silvia Salemi	Manuel De Peppe; Giampiero Artegiani; Silvia Salemi	5	
"Liberami"	Jalisse	Carmen Di Domenico; Fabio Ricci	6	
"Sottovoce"	Olivia	Franca Evangelisti; Stefano Borzi; Sandro Mattoccia	7	
"Amore di plastica"	Carmen Consoli	Carmen Consoli; Mario Venuti	8	
"E ci sei"	Petra Magoni	Marco D'Angelo; Marco Rinalduzzi; Massimo Calabrese; Zenîma; Petra Magoni	9	
"Zerotretresette"	Camilla	Paolo Martella; Camilla Lessona; Michele Violante; Kynsha	10	
"Il grido del silenzio"	Alessandro Errico	Alessandro Errico	11	
"Lasciarsi amare"	Leandro Barsotti	Leandro Barsotti	12	
"Ci sarò"	Alessandro Mara	Alessandro Maraniello	13	
"Un po' di tempo"	Maurizio Lauzi	Maurizio Lauzi	14	

== Guests ==
Guests
Artist(s)	Song(s)
Bruce Springsteen	"The Ghost of Tom Joad"
Pat Metheny and Rita Marcotulli	"Don’t Forget"
Blur	"Charmless Man"
Cher	"One By One"
Kenny G	"Forever in Love"
Tina Turner	"Whatever You Want"
East 17	"Do U Still?"
Vanessa-Mae	"Toccata and Fugue in D minor"
Celine Dion	"Callin’ You" "Falling into You"
Simply Red	"Never Never Love"
Andreas Vollenweider	"Sotto l’albero della speranza"
Take That	"How Deep Is Your Love"
The Kelly Family	"Why Why Why"
Bon Jovi	"Lie to Me"
George Benson	"The Long and Winding Road"
Michael Bolton	"When a Man Loves a Woman"
Alanis Morissette	"You Oughta Know"
The Cranberries	"Salvation"
