= Gli uomini non cambiano =

1992 song by Mia Martini

Single by Mia Martini

from the album Lacrime
- Released: 1992
- Length: 4:07
- Label: Fonit Cetra
- Songwriters: Giancarlo Bigazzi; Marco Falagiani; Beppe Dati

Mia Martini singles chronology
"La nevicata del '56" (1990)	"Gli uomini non cambiano" (1992)	"Rapsodia" (1992)

Audio
- "Gli uomini non cambiano" on YouTube

"Gli uomini non cambiano" (lit. 'Men don't change') is a 1992 Italian song by Mia Martini, composed by Giancarlo Bigazzi, Marco Falagiani and Beppe Dati. It was the lead single from Martini's album Lacrime.

== Overview ==
The song was chosen by Martini as her entry at the Sanremo Music Festival 1992, being preferred to other songs she significantly considered, "Fammi sentire bella", "Uomini farfalla", and "In una notte così", which was ultimately performed at the festival by Riccardo Fogli. In the weeks leading up to the festival, critics and journalists increasingly pointed to Martini's song as the frontrunner.

The song eventually placed second in the competition, behind Luca Barbarossa's "Portami a ballare", and ranked third in the critics' award, following Nuova Compagnia di Canto Popolare's "Pe' dispietto" and Tazenda's "Pitzinnos in sa gherra". Described as an "instant classic", the song has had an enduring success and has "stood the test of time without a single word losing its impact".

== Charts ==
Chart (1992)	Peak position
Italy (Musica e dischi)	12

== Certifications ==
Region	Certification	Certified units/sales
Italy (FIMI) Sales from 2009	Gold	25,000^{‡}
^{‡} Sales+streaming figures based on certification alone.
