= Sanremo Music Festival 1997 =

Italian song contest (47th edition)

Dates and venue
- Semi-final 1: 18 February 1997
- Semi-final 2: 19 February 1997
- Semi-final 3: 20 February 1997
- Semi-final 4: 21 February 1997
- Final: 22 February 1997
- Venue: Teatro Ariston; Sanremo, Italy

Organisation
- Broadcaster: Radiotelevisione italiana (RAI)
- Musical director: Gianfranco Lombardi
- Artistic director: Pino Donaggio, Giorgio Moroder, Carla Vistarini
- Presenters: Mike Bongiorno and Piero Chiambretti, Valeria Marini

Big Artists section
- Number of entries: 29
- Winner: "Fiumi di parole" Jalisse

Newcomers' section
- Number of entries: 12
- Winner: "Amici come prima" Paola e Chiara

The Sanremo Music Festival 1997 (Italian: Festival di Sanremo 1997), officially the 47th Italian Song Festival (47º Festival della canzone italiana), was the 47th annual Sanremo Music Festival, held at the Teatro Ariston in Sanremo in late February 1997 and broadcast by Radiotelevisione italiana (RAI). The show was presented by Mike Bongiorno (at his eleventh and final hosting of the festival), supported by Piero Chiambretti and Valeria Marini. Composers Pino Donaggio and Giorgio Moroder and lyricist Carla Vistarini served as the artistic directors.

In this edition, a "Quality Jury", responsible for rewarding the best music, best lyrics and best arrangement, was introduced. The 1997 jury was headed by Luciano Pavarotti and consisted of Bill Conti, Gino Paoli, Nicola Piovani and Mario Missiroli (who replaced Gabriele Salvatores, who suffered a flu). The winner of the Big Artists section was the pop duo Jalisse with the song "Fiumi di parole", while Patty Pravo won the Critics Award with the song "...E dimmi che non vuoi morire". Paola e Chiara won the Newcomers section with the song "Amici come prima". For the newcomers, only the winner was revealed; for the big artists section, initially only the first three positions were announced, while the complete final ranking was disclosed only several weeks after the end of the festival.

As a result of their victory, Jalisse represented Italy in the Eurovision Song Contest 1997, in which they eventually ranked fourth. It was Italy's first participation in the contest since 1993, as well as the first song to win Sanremo and represent the country since 1972. The country would once again withdraw following the 1997 contest and would not return until 2011.

Starting from the second night, the journalist Bruno Vespa hosted DopoFestival, a talk show about the Festival with the participation of singers, politicians and journalists.

== Participants and results ==
=== Big Artists ===
Big Artists section
Song	Artist(s)	Songwriter(s)	Rank	Notes
"Fiumi di parole"	Jalisse	Carmen Di Domenico; Alessandra Drusian; Fabio Ricci	1	Winner of the "Big Artists" section
"Storie"	Anna Oxa	Depsa; Marco Marati; Sally Monetti; Angelo Valsiglio; Fio Zanotti	2	
"Sei tu"	Syria	Claudio Mattone; Alberto Salerno	3	Award for Best Arrangement
"A casa di Luca"	Silvia Salemi	Giampiero Artegiani; Paolo Carta; Silvia Salemi	4	
"Non ami che te"	Fausto Leali	Roberto Pacco	5	
"Padre Nostro"	O.R.O.	Enrico Ruggeri; Mario Manzani	6	
"Laura non c'è"	Nek	Antonello de Sanctis; Nek; Massimo Varini	7	
"...E dimmi che non vuoi morire"	Patty Pravo	Vasco Rossi; Gaetano Curreri; Roberto Ferri	8	Mia Martini Critics Award; Volare Award for Best Music
"Ti parlerò d'amore"	Massimo Ranieri	Gianni Togni; Paolo Carta; Guido Morra	9	
"Nel respiro più grande"	Tosca	Susanna Tamaro; Rosalino Cellamare	10	
"Senza tù"	Francesco Baccini	Giorgio Conte; Francesco Baccini	11	
"È andata così"	Dirotta su Cuba	Cheope; Stefano De Donato; Pierpaolo D'Emilio; Rossano Gentili; Simona Bencini; Alberto Ravasini	12	
"Dentro me"	Marina Rei	Marina Rei; Frank Minoia	13	
"Verso il sole"	Albano Carrisi	Valentina Cidda; Albano Carrisi	14	
"Quello che sento"	Cattivi Pensieri	Cinzia Farolfi; Davide De Marinis; Davide Bosio; Niccolò Fragile	15	
"Papa nero"	Pitura Freska	Marco Furio Forieri; Sir Oliver Skardy; Valerio Silvestri; Cristiano Verardo; Francesco Duse	16	
"Faccia pulita"	Toto Cutugno	Toto Cutugno	17	
"Vero amore"	Ragazzi Italiani	Antonio Galbiati; Carlo Palmas; Maria Grazia Fontana	18	
"Alianti liberi"	New Trolls ft. Greta	Elio Palumbo; Massimiliano Cattapani; Vittorio De Scalzi; Nico Di Palo; Gabriella Labate	19	
"Luna"	Loredana Bertè	Loredana Bertè; Maurizio Piccoli	20	
"Attimi"	Alessandro Mara	Alessandro Mara	Eliminated	
"Come ti tradirei"	Camilla	Fabrizio Casalino; Michele Violante	Eliminated	
"Confusa e felice"	Carmen Consoli	Carmen Consoli	Eliminated	
"E penserò al tuo viso..."	Alessandro Errico	Alessandro Errico; Andrea Campisano; Roberto Gori	Eliminated	
"Fragolina"	Leandro Barsotti	Leandro Barsotti	Eliminated	
"Il capo dei giocattoli"	Maurizio Lauzi	Maurizio Lauzi	Eliminated	Volare Award for Best Lyrics
"Quando viene sera"	Olivia	Stefano Borzi; Aurozelli	Eliminated	
"Uguali uguali"	Adriana Ruocco	Franco Migliacci; Assolo; Migliacci; Roberto Zappalorto	Eliminated	
"Voglio un Dio"	Petra Magoni	Rodolfo Banchelli	Eliminated	

=== Newcomers ===
Newcomers section
Song	Artist(s)	Songwriter(s)	Notes
"Amici come prima"	Paola e Chiara	Paola & Chiara Iezzi	Winner of the Newcomers' section
"Capelli"	Niccolò Fabi	Cecilia Dazzi; Niccolò Fabi; Riccardo Sinigallia	Winner of the Mia Martini Critics Award - Newcomers' section
"Cambiare"	Alex Baroni	Alex Baroni; Massimo Calabrese; Marco Rinalduzzi; Marco D'Angelo	Best Vocal Performance Award (shared)
"Io senza te"	Domino	Domino; Piero Aloise; Luigi Lopez	Best Vocal Performance Award (shared)
"E la notte se ne va"	MikiMix	Matteo Bonsanto; Ugo Bolzoni; Giovanni Bianchi; Michele Salvemini	
"E ti sento"	Tony Blescia	Tony Blescia; Gatto Panceri; Bruno Santori; Tony Blescia	
"Innamorarsi è"	Vito Marletta	Gianfranco Caliendo; Franco Marino; Dora Vuolo-Famiglietti; Vito Marletta	
"No stop"	Randy Roberts	Claudio Mattone	
"Non si può dire mai... mai!"	Paolo Carta	Gatto Panceri; Paolo Carta; Nicola Costa	
"Ora che ci sei"	Massimo Caggiano	Maurizio Morante; Massimo Caggiano; Luciano Aita e Gianni Guarracino	
"Secolo crudele"	D.O.C. Rock	Giampiero Artegiani; Fernanda Tartaglia; Puccio Chiariello	
"Sonia dice di no"	Luca Lombardi	Davide Pinelli; Luca Lombardi	

== Guests ==
Guests
Artist(s)	Song(s)
Mark Owen	"Clementine"
Jamiroquai	"Cosmic Girl"
Spice Girls	"Wannabe" "Say You'll Be There"
Lionel Richie	"Amo, T'amo, Ti amo"
David Bowie	"Little Wonder"
Bee Gees	"Alone"
Fugees	"No Woman, No Cry"
Warren G	"I Shot the Sheriff"
Al Jarreau	"Medley"
Kula Shaker	"Tattva"
Natalie Cole	"Stardust"
Blackwood	"Ride on the Rhythm"
Mireille Mathieu	"La Vie en rose"
