= Elefante =

Elefante is the Italian, Spanish, Portuguese and Galician word for elephant: it may also refer to:

== Geography ==
- Elefante, a barangay of Banayoyo, Ilocos Sur, Philippines
- Roca Elefante, the westernmost points of Mexico, on Guadalupe Island
- Roccia dell Elefante, an archaeological site in Sardinia

== Music ==
- "Elefantes", a popular Latin American children's song similar to the American Ten Monkeys Jumpin' On the Bed
- "Elefantes", a song by Natalia Lafourcade from her 2002 album Natalia Lafourcade
- "El elefante", a song by Caifanes from their 1990 album El diablito
- El Elefante, an album by Leo Sidran
- Elefantes (band), a Spanish band active from 1994 to 2006
- Elefante (Mexican band), a Latin rock and pop band
- Elefante (Uruguayan band), an Uruguayan rock band
- Elefante, the 2015 album by BulletBoys
- Elefante, it goes like el elefante grande camina hacia delante el elefante tras camina hacia atras

== People ==
- John Elefante, an American rock and roll vocalist who got his start in the music business with the rock band Kansas
- Elefante Bianco, a seaman on the Witte Olifant, a Dutch ship in the Battle of Leghorn
- Michael Elefante, a member of the board of directors of Dow Jones & Company
- Rufus Elefante a corrupt political boss, trucker and activist in Utica, New York

== Other uses ==
- Cementerio de los Elefantes (Elephant Cemetery), the playing ground of Colón de Santa Fe, a football team from Santa Fe, Argentina
- L'elefante, the mascot of Pallacanestro Varese, an Italian basketball club founded in 1946
- Elefante TV, a defunct television channel in Italy
