= Sanremo Music Festival 1988 =

Italian song contest (38th edition)

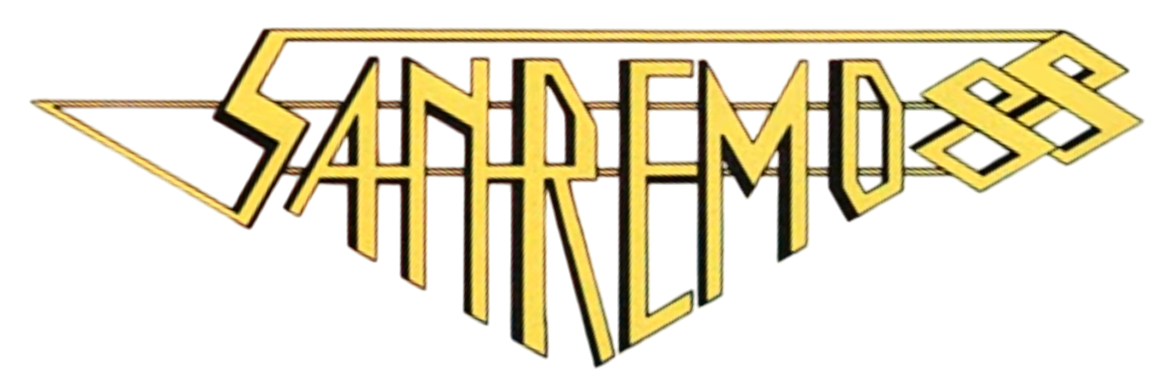

Dates and venue
- Semi-final 1: 24 February 1988
- Semi-final 2: 25 February 1988
- Semi-final 3: 26 February 1988
- Final: 27 February 1988
- Venue: Teatro Ariston; Sanremo, Italy

Organisation
- Broadcaster: Radiotelevisione italiana (RAI)
- Presenters: Miguel Bosé and Gabriella Carlucci

Big Artists section
- Number of entries: 26
- Winner: "Perdere l'amore" Massimo Ranieri

Newcomers' section
- Number of entries: 16
- Winner: "Canta con noi" Future

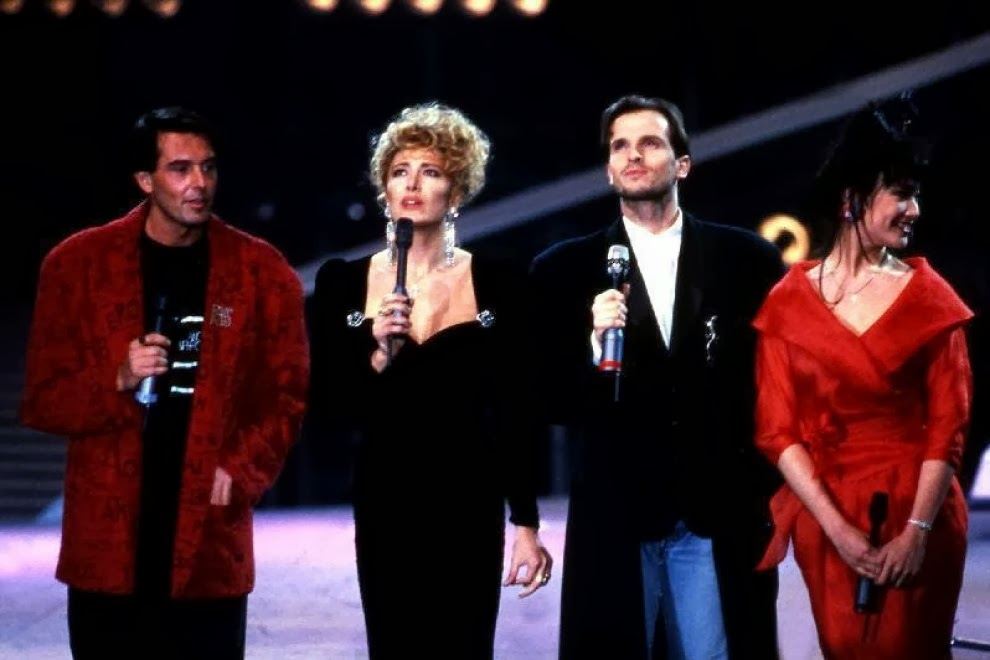
Bosé and Carlucci (center) hosting the festival

The Sanremo Music Festival 1988 (Italian: Festival di Sanremo 1988), officially the 38th Italian Song Festival (38º Festival della canzone italiana), was the 38th annual Sanremo Music Festival, held at the Teatro Ariston in Sanremo between 24 and 27 February 1988 and broadcast by Radiotelevisione italiana (RAI). The show was presented by Miguel Bosé and Gabriella Carlucci, while Carlo Massarini hosted the segments from the Sanremo PalaRock, and Kay Sandvick, Lara Saint Paul and Memo Remigi hosted the segments from the Sanremo Casino where a number of foreign guests performed.

The winner of the Big Artists section was Massimo Ranieri with the song "Perdere l'amore", while Fiorella Mannoia won the Critics Award with the song "Le notti di Maggio". The pop group Future won the Newcomers section with the song "Canta con noi".

== Participants and results ==
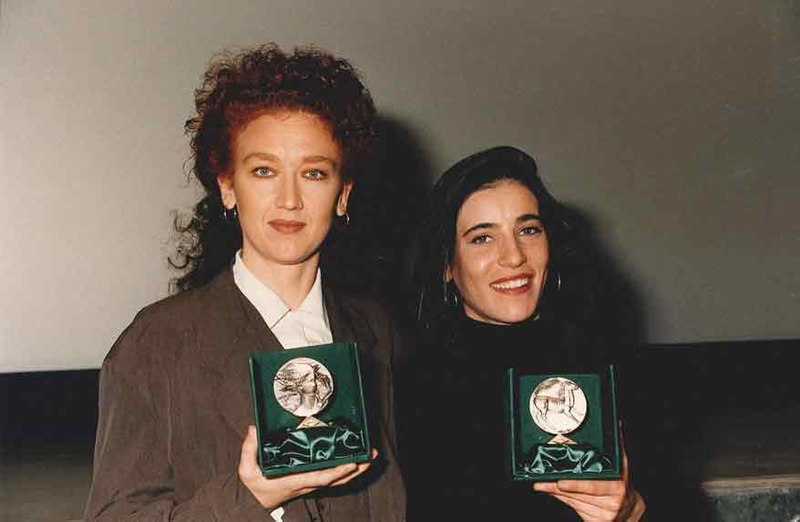
Fiorella Mannoia (left) and Paola Turci holding the Critics Awards, which they received in the Big Artists and Newcomers section, respectively

=== Big Artists ===
Big Artists section
| Song | Artist(s) | Songwriter(s) | Rank |
|---|---|---|---|
| "Perdere l'amore" | Massimo Ranieri | Marcello Marrocchi; Giampiero Artegiani | 1 |
| "Emozioni" | Toto Cutugno | Toto Cutugno | 2 |
| "L'amore rubato" | Luca Barbarossa | Luca Barbarossa | 3 |
| "Dopo la tempesta" | Marcella Bella | Alberto Salerno; Gianni Bella | 4 |
| "Mi manchi" | Fausto Leali | Fabrizio Berlincioni; Franco Fasano | 5 |
| "Italia" | Mino Reitano | Umberto Balsamo | 6 |
| "Quando nasce un amore" | Anna Oxa | Adelio Cogliati; Franco Ciani; Piero Cassano | 7 |
| "Per noi" | Fiordaliso | Toto Cutugno | 8 |
| "Nascerà Gesù" | Ricchi e Poveri | Umberto Balsamo | 9 |
| "Le notti di Maggio" | Fiorella Mannoia | Ivano Fossati | 10 / Critics Award |
| "Inevitabile follia" | Raf | Giancarlo Bigazzi; Raffaele Riefoli | 11 |
| "Sarà per te" | Francesco Nuti | Francesco Nuti | 12 |
| "Io (per le strade di quartiere)" | Franco Califano | Franco Califano; Toto Cutugno | 13 |
| "Nella valle dei Timbales" | Figli di Bubba (Note: Figli di Bubba ("Sons of Bubba") was a supergroup formed by Premiata Forneria Marconi members Mauro Pagani and Franz Di Cioccio, comedians Enzo Braschi and Sergio Vastano, record producer Roberto Manfredi and journalists Roberto Gatti and Alberto Tonti.) | Mauro Pagani | 14 |
| "Come un giorno di sole" | Michele Zarrillo | Giampiero Artegiani; Michele Zarrillo; Luigi Lopez | 15 |
| "Io" | Loredana Bertè | Tony Cicco | 16 |
| "Nun chiagnere" | Peppino di Capri | Lorenzo Raggi; Depsa; Franco Fasano | 17 |
| "Andamento lento" | Tullio De Piscopo | Tullio De Piscopo; Mario Capuano; Giosy Capuano | 18 |
| "La prima stella della sera" | Matia Bazar | Aldo Stellita; Sergio Cossu; Carlo Marrale | 19 |
| "Era bella davvero" | Drupi | Oscar Avogadro; Paolo Amerigo Cassella; Dario Farina | 20 |
| "Il mondo avrà una grande anima" | Ron | Ron | 21 |
| "Una bella canzone" | Flavia Fortunato | Oscar Avogadro; Mario Lavezzi | 22 |
| "Cielo chiaro" | New Trolls | Vittorio De Scalzi; Nico Di Palo; Gianni Belleno | 23 |
| "Ma che idea" | Denovo | Luca Madonia | 24 |
| "Le tue chiavi non ho" | Nino Buonocore | Alberto Salerno; Nino Buonocore | 25 |
| "Come per miracolo" | Alan Sorrenti | Alan Sorrenti; Giorgio Cavalli | 26 |

=== Newcomers ===
Newcomers section
| Song | Artist(s) | Songwriter(s) | Rank |
|---|---|---|---|
| "Canta con noi" | Future | Marco Battistini; Mino Reitano; Gegè Reitano; Franco Sacco; Ricky Bolognesi | 1 |
| "Una carezza d'aiuto" | Stefano Palatresi | Renzo Arbore; Claudio Mattone | 2 |
| "Per noi giovani" | Lijao | Piero Cassano; Livio Visentin; Adelio Cogliati | 3 |
| "Ogni tanto si sogna" | Miki | Michele Porru | 4 |
| "Io con te" | Giorgia Fiorio | Roberto Ferri; Mauro Paoluzzi | Semifinalist |
| "La notte delle favole" | Tania Tedesco | Depsa; Angela Brambati; Piero Ameli | Semifinalist |
| "Sarò bellissima" | Paola Turci | Gaio Chiocchio; Roberto Righini | Semifinalist / Critics Award |
| "Se fosse vero" | Stefania La Fauci | Marco Armani; Paolo Armenise | Semifinalist |
| "Canto Bolero" | Stefano Ruffini | Marco Luberti; Grazia Di Michele; Francesco Gazillo | Eliminated |
| "L'ultima bugia" | Fabio De Rossi | Massimiliano Governi; Fabio De Rossi | Eliminated |
| "Mama" | Ice | Piero Marras | Eliminated |
| "Non è segreto" | Andrea Mirò | Armando Mango | Eliminated |
| "Sarà forte" | Bungaro | Pino Romanelli; Antonio Calò | Eliminated |
| "Sogno" | Mietta | Claudio Mattone | Eliminated |
| "Uno spiraglio al cuore" | Mariella Nava | Mariella Nava | Eliminated |
| "Voglio vivere in un attimo" | Biagio Antonacci | Biagio Antonacci; Rosalino Cellamare | Eliminated |

== Broadcasts ==
=== Local broadcasts ===
All shows were broadcast on Rai Uno.

=== International broadcasts ===
Known details on the broadcasts in each country, including the specific broadcasting stations and commentators are shown in the tables below.

International broadcasters of the Sanremo Music Festival 1988
| Country | Broadcaster | Channel(s) | Commentator(s) | Ref(s) |
|---|---|---|---|---|
| United States | WNYC-TV (Note: Delayed broadcast on 28 February at 14:00 (EDT)) | | | |
| Yugoslavia | JRT | TV Beograd 1, TV Zagreb 1 | | , |
| Yugoslavia | JRT | TV Ljubljana 2 | | |
| Yugoslavia | JRT | TV Prishtina | | |
