= Sanremo Music Festival 1992 =

Italian song contest (42nd edition)

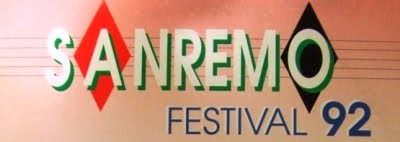

Dates and venue
- Semi-final 1: 26 February 1992
- Semi-final 2: 27 February 1992
- Semi-final 3: 28 February 1992
- Final: 29 February 1992
- Venue: Teatro Ariston; Sanremo, Italy

Organisation
- Broadcaster: Radiotelevisione italiana (RAI)
- Artistic director: Adriano Aragozzini, Carlo Bixio, Marco Ravera
- Presenters: Pippo Baudo and Milly Carlucci, Brigitte Nielsen, Alba Parietti

Big Artists section
- Number of entries: 24
- Winner: "Portami a ballare" Luca Barbarossa

Newcomers' section
- Number of entries: 18
- Winner: "Non amarmi" Aleandro Baldi and Francesca Alotta

The Sanremo Music Festival 1992 (Italian: Festival di Sanremo 1992), officially the 42nd Italian Song Festival (42º Festival della canzone italiana), was the 42nd annual Sanremo Music Festival, held at the Teatro Ariston in Sanremo between 26 and 29 February 1992 and broadcast by Radiotelevisione italiana (RAI). The show was presented by Pippo Baudo, assisted by Milly Carlucci, Brigitte Nielsen and Alba Parietti.

The winner of the Big Artists section was Luca Barbarossa with the ballad "Portami a ballare", while the folk group Nuova Compagnia di Canto Popolare won the Critics Award with the song "Pe' dispietto". The couple Aleandro Baldi and Francesca Alotta won the Newcomers section with the song "Non amarmi".

== Participants and results ==
=== Big Artists ===
Big Artists section
Song	Artist(s)	Songwriter(s)	Rank
"Portami a ballare"	Luca Barbarossa	Luca Barbarossa	1
"Gli uomini non cambiano"	Mia Martini	Giuseppe Dati; Marco Falagiani; Giancarlo Bigazzi	2
"La forza della vita"	Paolo Vallesi	Giuseppe Dati; Paolo Vallesi	3
"Italia d'oro"	Pierangelo Bertoli	Pierangelo Bertoli; Marco Negri	4
"Ti penso"	Massimo Ranieri	Fabrizio Berlincioni; Silvio Amato	5
"Piccoli giganti"	Matia Bazar	Aldo Stellita; Sergio Cossu; Carlo Marrale; Laura Valente	6
"Per niente al mondo"	Flavia Fortunato and Franco Fasano	Franco Fasano; Fabrizio Berlincioni	7
"Pitzinnos in sa gherra"	Tazenda	Luigi Marielli; Fabrizio De André; Luigi Marielli	8
"Perché"	Fausto Leali	Aleandro Baldi; Giancarlo Bigazzi	9
"In una notte così"	Riccardo Fogli	Guido Morra; Maurizio Fabrizio	10
"Strade di Roma"	Michele Zarrillo	Vincenzo Incenzo; Michele Zarrillo; Antonello Venditti	11
"Mendicante"	Mariella Nava	Mariella Nava	12
"Un uomo in più"	Drupi	Depsa; Franco Fasano	13
"Favola blues"	Peppino di Capri and Pietra Montecorvino	Fabrizio Berlincioni; Mimmo Di Francia; Giuseppe Faiella	14
"Quelli come noi"	New Trolls	D. Gori; Nico Di Palo; Gianni Belleno; Vittorio De Scalzi; Fabrizio Berlincioni	15
"Così lontani"	Ricchi e Poveri	Toto Cutugno	Eliminated
"È una nanna"	Scialpi	Scialpi	Eliminated
"Femmene 'e mare"	Lina Sastri	R. Giglio; Rodolfo Fiorillo	Eliminated
"Io ti darò"	Paolo Mengoli	Graziano Alberghini; Paolo Mengoli; Giancarlo Trombetti	Eliminated
"La mia preghiera"	Pupo	Enzo Ghinazzi	Eliminated
"Ma ti sei chiesto mai"	Mino Reitano	Franco Reitano; Mino Reitano; Patrizia Vernola; Giuseppe Andreetto	Eliminated
"Pe' dispietto"	Nuova Compagnia di Canto Popolare	Corrado Sfogli; Paolo Raffone; Carlo Faiello	Eliminated / Critics Award
"Rumba di tango"	Giorgio Faletti and Orietta Berti	Giorgio Faletti	Eliminated
"Un frammento rosa"	Formula 3	Massimo Luca; Loredana Bevini	Eliminated

=== Newcomers ===
Newcomers section
Song	Artist(s)	Songwriter(s)	Rank
"Non amarmi"	Aleandro Baldi and Francesca Alotta	Aleandro Baldi; Giancarlo Bigazzi; Marco Falagiani	1
"Come una Turandot"	Irene Fargo	Enzo Miceli; Gaetano Lorefice	2
"Con un amico vicino"	Alessandro Bono ft. Andrea Mingardi	Claudio Mattone	3
"Che ne sai della notte"	Lorenzo Zecchino	Lorenzo Zecchino	4
"Amica di scuola"	Patrizia Bulgari	Gianni Ciarella; Manuel De Peppe	5
"Brutta"	Alessandro Canino	Giuseppe Dati; Bruno Zucchetti	6
"Non è colpa di nessuno"	Rita Forte	Comas; Antonio Bella; Arturo Zitelli	7
"Uomo allo specchio"	Massimo Modugno	Franco Migliacci; F. Palazzolo	8
"Abbiamo vinto il Festival di Sanremo"	Statuto	Oscar Giammarinaro	9
"Cosa farà Dio di me"	Tosca	Andrea De Angelis; Laurex	Eliminated
"Datemi per favore"	Bracco Di Graci	Bracco Di Graci	Eliminated
"Io scappo via"	Aida Satta Flores	Aida Satta Flores	Eliminated
"L'amore va oltre"	Gatto Panceri	Gatto Panceri	Eliminated
"Piccola Africa"	Stefano Polo	Cheope; Maurizio Piccoli; Roberto Pacco	Eliminated
"Principessa scalza"	Andrea Monteforte	Andrea Monteforte; Gino Paoli	Eliminated
"Sai cosa sento per te"	Tomato	Giorgio Vanni; Claudio D’Onofrio; Paolo Costa	Eliminated
"Un altro mondo nell'universo"	Giampaolo Bertuzzi	Simona Zanini; Marco Tansini	Eliminated
"Zitti zitti (Il silenzio è d'oro)"	Aeroplanitaliani	Alessio Bertallot; Roberto Vernetti; Francesco Nemola	Eliminated / Critics Award

== Broadcasts ==
=== Local broadcasts ===
All shows were broadcast on Rai Uno.

=== International broadcasts ===
Known details on the broadcasts in each country, including the specific broadcasting stations and commentators are shown in the tables below.

International broadcasters of the Sanremo Music Festival 1992
Country	Broadcaster	Channel(s)	Commentator(s)	Ref(s)
United States	KTSF (Note: Delayed broadcast on 21 June at 23:15 (PDT))			
