= I Teoremi =

Italian progressive rock band (1969–1972)

- Origin: Rome, Italy
- Genres: Hard rock, progressive rock
- Years active: 1969–1972
- Labels: Polaris
- Past members: Tito Gallo; Mario Schilirò; Aldo Bellanova; Claudio Mastracci; Vincenzo Massetti "Lord Enzo"

I Teoremi were an Italian progressive rock band.

== Origin ==
I Teoremi born in Rome, from the ashes of complex beat Cuori di pietra e I figli di... in the late 1960s, the band includes original, Gabriele Calano guitars and vocals), Aldo Bellanova (bass, flute and vocals) Claudio Mastracci (drums, percussion and vocals) and a keyboardist. Their repertoire, with the subsequent addition of Titus Gallen (vocals and harmonica), from another group beat Roman Empire, the Diapason, and the takeover of Stefano Sabatini (former member of Free Love, with some recordings for Vedette) on keyboards (now jazz pianist) aimed straight for the progressive rock with a distinctive vocal style inspired by the propensity for Vanilla Fudge. A few years after having made known to roman or not, they recorded their first 7" in 1971 for the Polaris, with a dream on the A side, the idea of Marcello Esposito (a songwriter friend of the band), but signed by Bruno Pallesi for text and Vanni Moretto and Mario Battaini for music, while the B-side of a unique cover, probably, Jethro Tull, Tutte le cose ("With you there to help me"), where the flute of Ian Anderson is replaced by harmonica.

Fall left the band and he was replaced temporarily Walter Sabatini on guitar, only to be replaced permanently by Mario Schiliro, the band, then, will affect a 33 rpm with the final formation in 1972 with Vincenzo Massetti (previously active as a solo artist under the pseudonym Lord Enzo, with assets including a stake in the Festival of unknown Ariccia in 1968) on vocals, hard rock album with influences. After attending the Cantaestate in the same year, Theorems melt.

Aldo Bellanova then entered into Samadhi, Vincenzo Massetti left Italy to Thailand, where he still works as a singer, Mastracci became the drummer for many artists, including Lostprophets and Sergio Caputo, and Schilirò has become one of the most famous Italian guitarist, played with many artists including Antonello Venditti, Claudio Baglioni, Luca Barbarossa, Patti Pravo, Riccardo Cocciante, Marco Ferradini, Goran Kuzminac, Mario Castelnuovo, also becoming a session man at the Italian RCA and then guitarist of Sugar (and playing among others with Eric Clapton, Brian May, Paul Young and Steve Winwood). Their album has been reissued over the years in both vinyl and CD in 1993, in 1999 and 2011.

== Personnel ==
- Tito Gallo: voice (until 1971)
- Vincenzo Massetti: voice (in 1972)
- Mario Schilirò: guitar
- Aldo Bellanova: bass
- Claudio Mastracci: drums

== Discography ==
- 1972: I Teoremi (Polaris, POL/BP 711)

== See also ==
- Italian progressive rock
