= Tosca (singer) =

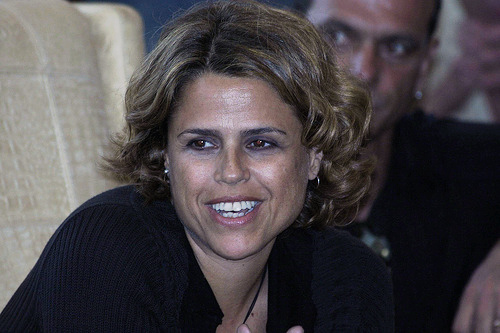
- Tosca in 2007

Background information
- Born: Tiziana Donati; 29 August 1967 (age 58); Rome, Italy
- Genres: World
- Occupations: Singer, actress
- Years active: 1989–present
- Website: tizianatoscadonati.it

Tiziana Donati (born 29 August 1967), better known by the stage name Tosca, is an Italian singer and actress.

== Early life and career beginnings ==
Born in Rome, Donati began her artistic career in the small theatre company of Checco Durante, a piano bar in her home town. Her career was then launched by Renzo Arbore in a television broadcast Il caso Sanremo with Lino Banfi.

== Music career ==
In 1989 she sang the song "Carcere 'e mare" ("Sea prison") for the title track of the film Street Kids directed by Nanni Loy. In 1992 she released her first album eponymously named Tosca and she took part in the newcomers' section of the Sanremo Music Festival 1992 with the song "Cosa farà Dio di me" ("What shall God do with me"). In 1993 she worked on her second album entitled Attrice ("Actress").

In 1996 she performed in several collaborations: with Lucio Dalla she sang the duet "Rispondimi" ("Answer me"), with Riccardo Cocciante she sang "L'amore esiste ancora" ("Love still exists"), with Renato Zero she sang "Inventi" ("You think up"), and finally, with Ron she won the Sanremo Music Festival 1996 with the song "Vorrei incontrarti fra cent'anni" ("I want to meet you in one hundred years"). She then released L'altra Tosca ("The other Tosca"), an anthology of all her most significant duets. In October of the same year she played the protagonist in Il carro fantastico ("The fantastic cart") at La Scala in Milan. Also in 1996, she performed the title-track to the movie Jane Eyre directed by Franco Zeffirelli.

Tosca participated in the Sanremo Music Festival 1997 with the song "Nel respiro più grande" ("In the biggest breath"), written by Susanna Tamaro and set to music by Ron. In the spring of the same year, her fourth album Incontri e passaggi ("Meetings and passings") was released, in which she performed songs written for her by Ennio Morricone, Chico Buarque de Hollanda, Ivano Fossati and others. She won the Tenco Plaque in 1997 as the "most outstanding performer".

In 1998 she performed in the Italian dub of the cartoon Anastasia together with Fiorello, and she played the role of Milly, the main character in the musical Sette spose per sette fratelli (Seven Brides for Seven Brothers) with Raffaele Paganini. In 1999, she started her collaboration with the Vatican, taking part in several worldwide TV events for the 2000 Jubilee. She was chosen to sing "Mater Iubilaei", the Marian hymn for the Jubilee. In May of the same year, she performed the newborn prayer for the first time in the Lourdes grotto, becoming the first singer ever to perform inside it. In 2000 she toured with Musica Caeli, a concert made up of never-before performed sacred chants, in churches and cathedrals of foreign capitals and in front of high-ranking religious authorities. She performed "Mater Iubilaei" under the Holy Door before John Paul II during the closing ceremony of the Jubilee.

In 2001 she took part in the Taormina art contest playing the main character in the musical Salvatore Giuliano together with Giampiero Ingrassia under the direction of Armando Pugliese. In 2002 she played and sang in the show Wozzeck, Lulu, la Morte e gli altri ("Wozzeck, Lulu, Death and the others") partnering with Carla Fracci under the direction of Beppe Menegatti at the Rome Opera House. She also played in one edition of Monologhi della vagina ("Monologues of the vagina") directed by Emanuela Giordano. In 2003 she debuted with her self-authored musical Notte in bianco ("Sleepless night"), directed by Claudio Insegno and associated with the release of her fifth album Sto bene al mondo ("I feel good in the world").

Between 2004 and 2005 she sang Romanesco songs in the show Semo o nun semo ("Are we or are we not") by Nicola Piovani. Between 2003 and 2005 she also performed the role of Jenny in L'opera da tre soldi (The Threepenny Opera) by Bertold Brecht, along with Massimo Venturiello. Again with Venturiello, she performed as Nadia along in Tango delle ore piccole (Heartbreak Tango) by Manuel Puig during the 2004–2005 season. In June 2005 she debuted in the Asti Theatre playing Romana ("Roman woman"), a tribute to Gabriella Ferri. The show was directed by Massimo Venturiello. She took part in the production of the movie Baciami piccina with Neri Marcorè and Vincenzo Salemme.

In 2006, she received a Nastro d'Argento nomination for best score, for the original song "Cielo e terra" ("Sky and earth") by Pietro Cantarelli from the soundtrack of the eponymous film. From 2006 to 2008 she played the part of Lucia in Gastone, by Ettore Petrolini directed by Massimo Venturiello. She took part in the Sanremo Music Festival 2007 with the song "Il terzo fuochista" ("The third fireman"), written by Massimo Venturiello and set to music by Ruggiero Mascellino.

In the 2008–2009 theatrical season, she performed Gelsomina in the theatrical arrangement of Federico Fellini's La strada, directed by Massimo Venturiello. From 2009 to 2011 she performed on the stage with Musicanti ("Musicians") with Venturiello, who was also the director and writer of the show. In June 2010 she was the protagonist voice in the composition of Marco Betta with a libretto of Francesco Busalacchi, La corona di Tombacco. That same year, she recorded an album about Trentino, titled Trentino senza tempo ("Timeless Trentino") with the band of Albiano, directed by Marco Somadossi. In February 2011 she published the song "Il bel paese degli animali" ("The fair land of animals") written by Massimo Venturiello and set to music by Ruggiero Mascellino, a song of protest against dictatorships. In April 2011 she made her debut with the show Il borghese gentiluomo (Le Bourgeois gentilhomme) by Molière, again directed by Venturiello; the opera was on stage until 2013. She was also present at the show Italiane ("Italian women") in September 2011, at the Teatro Argentina in Rome, with Maddalena Crippa and Lina Sastri, and Emanuela Giordano as the director. The following October she debuted with the musical Zoom, written and directed by Massimo Venturiello and set to music by Ruggiero Mascellino.

In 2014 she released the album Il suono della voce ("The sound of voice") and in 2017 Appunti musicali dal mondo ("Musical 'notes' from around the world"). The trilogy was completed with her latest work Morabeza, released in October 2019. The record, produced and arranged by Joe Barbieri, includes original songs, modern reinterpretations of world classics of music, sung in four languages with famous artists that Tosca met along her journey: Ivan Lins, Arnaldo Antunes, Cyrille Aimée, Luisa Sobral, Lenine, Awa Ly, Vincent Ségal, Lofti Bouchnak, Cèzar Mendes. Tosca participated in the Sanremo Music Festival 2020 with the song "Ho amato tutto" ("I loved everything").

== Discography ==
=== Albums ===
- Tosca (1992)
- Attrice (1993)
- L'altra Tosca (1996)
- Incontri e passaggi (1997)
- Sto bene al mondo (2003)
- Romana (2006)
- Trentino senza tempo (2010)
- Il suono della voce (2014)
- Appunti musicali dal mondo (2017)
- Morabeza (2019)
