= Syria (singer) =

Italian singer

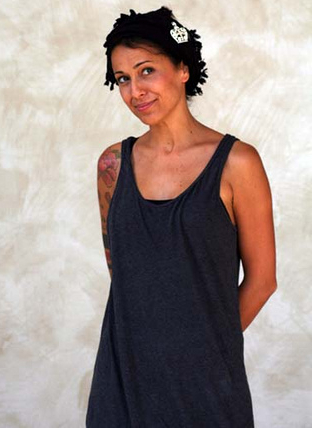
- Syria in 2008
- Born: Cecilia Cipressi; 26 February 1977 (age 49); Rome, Italy
- Occupation: Singer

Cecilia Cipressi (born 26 February 1977), known professionally as Syria or Airys, is an Italian singer and entertainer.

== Life and career ==
Born in Rome, Syria is the daughter of Elio Cipressi, a record producer and former singer. She was recognised by composer Claudio Mattone, winning the Newcomers competition at the 46th edition of the Sanremo Music Festival with the song "Non ci sto." The following year, she achieved third place in the Big Artists competition of the Festival with the song "Sei tu".

In 2002, she made her debut as a songwriter with the song "Lettera ad Alice". In 2009, she adopted the stage name Airys for the electro-dance EP Vivo, amo, esco. In 2011 Syria was vocal coach in the Rai 2 talent show Star Academy, and in 2016 she was a juror in the Italia 1 talent show TOP DJ. Additionally, she has performed as a stage actress alongside Paolo Rossi and Francesco Paolantoni.

== Discography ==
Albums

- 1996 - Non ci sto
- 1997 - L'angelo
- 1998 - Station Wagon
- 2000 - Come una goccia d'acqua
- 2002 - Le mie favole
- 2005 - Non è peccato
- 2008 - Un'altra me
- 2009 - Vivo amo esco (EP, under the pseudonym Airys)
- 2011 - Scrivere al futuro
- 2014 - Syria 10
- 2017 - 10+10

Awards and achievements
| Preceded by Neri per Caso with "Le ragazze" | Sanremo Music Festival; Winner Newcomers section 1996 | Succeeded by Paola e Chiara with "Amici come prima" |
