= Vorrei incontrarti fra cent'anni =

Single by Ron & Tosca

from the album Vorrei incontrarti fra cent'anni
- Released: February 1996
- Genre: Pop
- Length: 3:58
- Label: WEA
- Songwriter(s): Ron

Ron singles chronology
"Tutti quanti abbiamo un angelo" (1994)	"Vorrei incontrarti fra cent'anni" (1996)	"Ferite e lacrime" (1996)

Tosca singles chronology
"Fuoco" (1993)	"Vorrei incontrarti fra cent'anni" (1996)	"Nel respiro più grande" (1997)

Audio
- "Vorrei incontrarti fra cent'anni" on YouTube

"Vorrei incontrarti fra cent'anni" (transl. "I Would Like To Meet You In 100 Years") is a 1996 Italian song written and performed by singer-songwriter Ron in duet with Tosca.

This song won the 46th edition of the Sanremo Music Festival, as well as the Volare prize for best lyrics. Tosca's presence had not been announced in the official list of participants, and her surprise entrance on stage after the song had started added extra theatrical effect to the performance. Tosca was chosen two weeks before the start of the competition, and replaced Ron's original choice Spagna, who had eventually been entered into the competition with her own composition "E io penso a te".

== Track listing ==
No.	Title	Length
1.	"Vorrei incontrarti fra cent'anni"	3:58

== Charts ==
=== Weekly charts ===
Chart (1996)	Peak position
Europe (European Hot 100 Singles)	33
Italy (Musica e dischi)	18
Italy Airplay (Music & Media)	2
