= Federico Salvatore =

Italian singer-songwriter and comedian (1959–2023)

- Salvatore at the Sanremo Music Festival 1996
- Born: 17 September 1959; Naples, Italy
- Died: 19 April 2023 (aged 63); Naples, Italy
- Occupation: Singer-songwriter

Federico Salvatore (17 September 1959 – 19 April 2023) was an Italian singer-songwriter and comedian.

== Life and career ==
Born in Naples, Salvatore started his career in the late 1980s as a stand-up comedian and as a singer-songwriter of humorous and satirical songs. After enjoying local success, he became nationally well-known during the 1990s thanks to his semi-regular participation in the Canale 5 program Maurizio Costanzo Show. Produced by Giancarlo Bigazzi, he got a significant success with the albums Azz... and Il mago di Azz, which were both certified platinum.

In 1996, he entered the main competition at the 46th edition of the Sanremo Music Festival with the song "Sulla porta", the first Sanremo Festival song having homosexuality as main theme. In 2001, he entered the Festival di Napoli competition with "Se io fossi San Gennaro", a ballad about Naples which raised controversy because of his lyrics critical of the social situation of the city.

Struck by a cerebral haemorrhage in October 2021, he never fully recovered, and died on 19 April 2023, at the age of 63.

== Discography ==
Album

- 1989 – 'Na tazzulella 'e ca...baret
- 1990 – Pappagalli lat(r)ini
- 1991 – Incidente al Vomero
- 1992 – Cabarettombola
- 1993 – Storie di un sottosviluppato... sviluppato sotto!!!
- 1994 – Superfederico
- 1995 – Azz...
- 1996 – Il mago di Azz
- 1997 – Coiote interrotto
- 2000 – L'azz 'e bastone
- 2002 – L'osceno del villaggio
- 2004 – Dov'è l'individuo?
- 2009 – Fare il napoletano... stanca!
- 2011 – Se io fossi San Gennaro – LIVE
- 2013 – Pulcin'hell
- 2020 – Sta luna pare ’na scorza ’e limone
