= I Teoremi (album) =

Studio album by I Teoremi
- Released: 1972
- Genre: Progressive rock, Italian Progressive Rock
- Label: Polaris

I Teoremi is the first and only album by the Italian progressive rock band I Teoremi, released in 1972.

The music in this album is more like Led Zeppelin style hard rock but the overall sound is more progressive due to the imaginative rhythm section. The music highlights the electric guitar but it is actually the bassist that steals the show. The keyboards (piano) are featured in only one of the tracks. The album is generally not considered a very progressive album in the true meaning of the word but a good album nevertheless.

== Personnel ==
I TEOREMI 7" with Tito gallo (voice) recorded a 7” in 1971 Sognare and Tutte le cose Original by Jethro Tull, ("With you there to help me")

- Tito Gallo - Voice
- Mario Schilirò - Guitar
- Aldo Bellanova - Bass
- Claudio Mastracci - Drums

• I TEOREMI LP was recorded in 1972

Vincenzo Massetti: voice • Mario Schilirò: guitar • Aldo Bellanova: bass • Claudio Mastracci: drums

== Track listing ==
1. Impressione
2. Mare della tranquillità
3. Passi da gigante
4. Nuvola che copri il sole
5. Qualcosa d'irreale
6. Il dialogo d'un pazzo
7. A chi non ci sarà più

• • • • Some production house combined the two records in one •

== See also ==
- Italian progressive rock
