= Elefante TV =

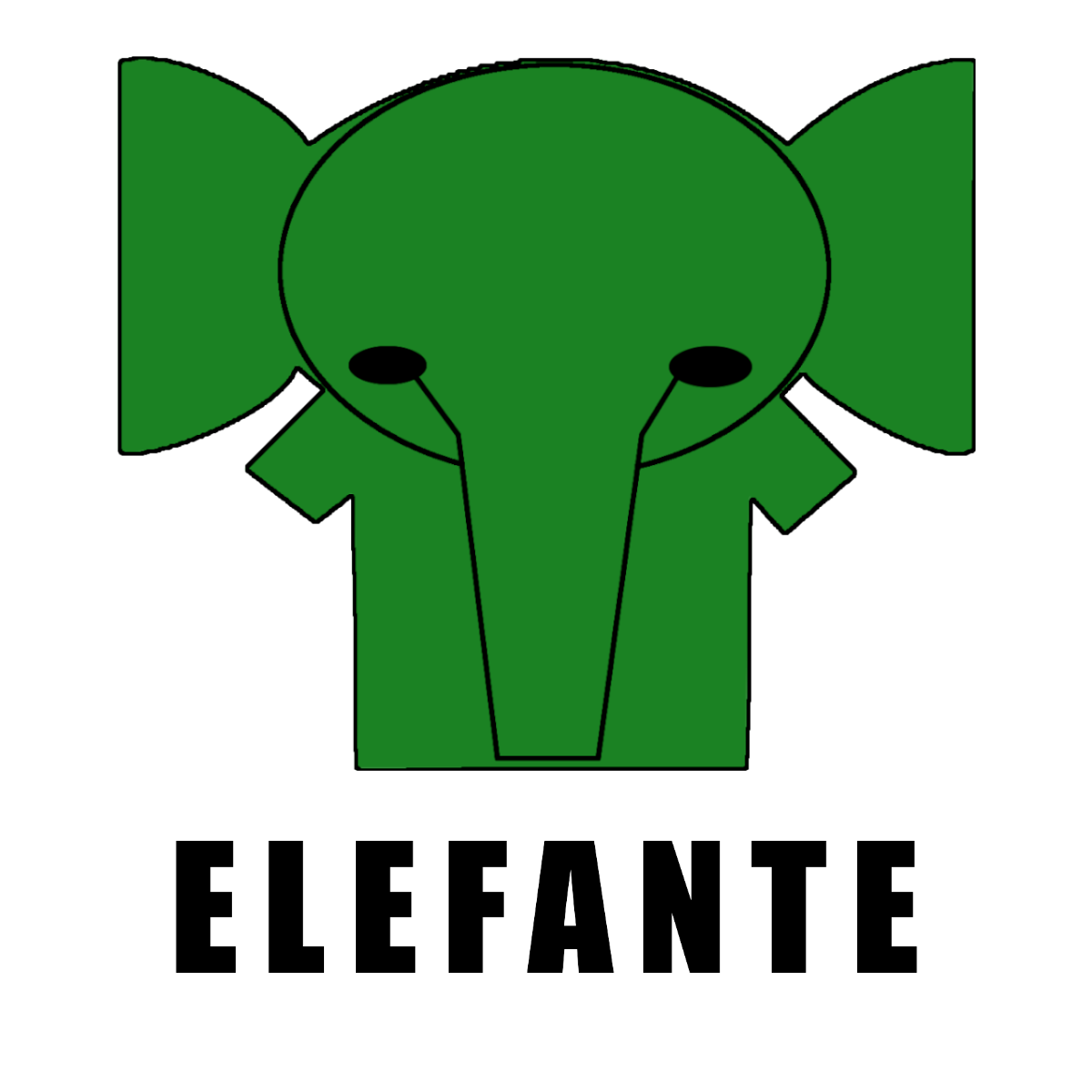
- Country: Italy
- Broadcast area: Italy

Programming
- Language: Italian

Ownership
- Owner: Marcucci family

History
- Launched: 1979; 47 years ago
- Closed: 21 March 1988; 38 years ago

Elefante TV was an Italian syndication network established in 1979 by the Tuscan Marcucci family and broadcast nationwide. It shut down between 1987 and 1988, being replaced by either Telemarket or Retemia, depending on the station.

== History ==
Elefante TV was born in January 1979 by brothers Leo and Guelfo Marcucci, active in the pharmaceutical sector dedicated to blood-derived medication and relayers of foreign networks TV Koper-Capodistria, Radiotelevisione Svizzera Italiana and La7#HistoryTelemontecarlo through their company S.I.T. (Società Impianti Televisivi), which operated in Castelvecchio Pascoli, Barga, Lucca Province.

The circuit originated from their previous experience at TVS Telexpress, which later became the network's main station, broadcast across nearly all of Italy through a series of local stations, some owned by S.I.T., others being just affiliates.

Among its owned-and-operated stations, in the early years of the syndication, there were, other than TVS Telexpress in Lucca (later renamed Tele Ciocco), Telexpress 2 in Bologna for Emilia-Romagna, Telenord Milano for Lombardy, Tele Urbe and Tele Navona in Rome, Tele San Marco in Rovigo for Triveneto, Teledue in Torino, Tele Radio Express in Genova and Telesud in Naples. Its director was Tuscan Paolo Tambini, a well-known figure in the national television landscape. Its schedule in the early 80s was of a high level and one of its top programs was its news bulletin Echomondo broadcast in several editions a day, as well as weekly specials which offerec a vast overview of international events. The network offered a line-up with feature films and TV series of good production quality. There were also cartoons, including Japanese anime and a substantial amount of Hanna-Barbera productions. The schedule also included sports and information programs. All of this lasted until 1985 when the network achieved wide coverage thanks also to its affiliate stations which relayed its programming successfully.

By the mid-80s, the network progressively turned towards a merely commercial schedule, giving significant amounts of airtime to external advertisers. In this period, teleshopping from Wanna Marchi, live shopping dedicated to jewelry and antique articles, the broadcasts of Otelma (magician) and commercial conteiner programs with segments of several topics by Roberto Artigiani. By late 1986, it started including the test "Video Shop" simultaneously with that of the channel.

In 1987, a part of its frequencies was given to Videomusic, founded by the same Marcucci group, or were used to relay TSI's signal, while the rest of the network was used acquired by Giorgio Mendella from Intermercado, who on 21 May 1988, changed the name to Retemia.

== Programming ==
Partial list:

- Notiziario elettorale (election period)
- Bricolage
- Faccia straccia
- Tribunetta
- Uno contro tutti
- Rombo (motors)
- Teatrino (kids)
- L'opinione
- Echomondo, presented by Franco Bini
- Il grillo parlante, with Beppe Grillo
- Ultimo appello, with Maurizio Mosca
- Tu e le stelle, with Otelma
- Avanti c'è posto, full play, variety with Minnie Minoprio
- Superstar
- Hata Yoga (corso pratico di yoga)
- Per mare a vela
- Pescasport
- Chuck e Nora (Evangelical churches)
- Buongiorno
- Il braccio violento del Kung-Fu

== Affiliate stations ==
- Tele Ciocco
- Telexpress 2
- Tele Nord Milano
- Tele Navona
- Tele Urbe
- Tele San Marco
- Teleradio Mare Mediterraneo
- ATC Telesud
- Canale C (Campania)
- Quartarete TV (Piedmont)
- Teledue
- TVC 60 Varese
- Studio Uno (Lombardy)
- Radio Tele Garda
- Due Riviere TV Chiavari
- Teletoscana Sport
- Teleottanta
- Radio Gari TV
- Radio Tele Aprilia
- Tele Teramo
- Telesud (Caserta)
- Antenna Sud Vesuvio
- Telesalerno 1
- Tele Sud Icoa
- RTF
- Teleregione Color
- Delta TV
- Tele Isernia
- Euro Tele Crotone
- Telecolor (Catanzaro)
- Tele Radio Canicattì
- Videomediterraneo
- Teleibea
- ITC (Palermo)
- TeleMessina
- Telerama
- Tele Etere

== Bibliography ==
- Aldo Grasso, La Tv del sommerso, Milano, Mondadori, 2006. ISBN 88-04-56194-7
- Giancarlo Dotto e Sandro Piccinini, Il mucchio selvaggio. La strabiliante, epica, inverosimile ma vera storia della televisione locale in Italia, Milano, Mondadori, 2006. ISBN 88-04-53952-6
- Joseph Baroni, Dizionario della Televisione. I programmi della televisione commerciale dagli esordi a oggi, Milano, Raffaello Cortina Editore, 2005. ISBN 88-7078-972-1
