= A casa di Luca =

Single by Silvia Salemi

from the album Caotica
- Released: February 1997
- Length: 3:58
- Label: Oltre La Musica
- Songwriter(s): Giampiero Artegiani, Silvia Salemi

Silvia Salemi singles chronology
| "Quando il cuore" (1996) | "A casa di Luca" (1997) | "Stai con me stanotte" (1997) |

Music video
- "A casa di Luca" on YouTube

"A casa di Luca" (lit. 'At Luca's house') is a 1997 song by Silvia Salemi.

== Overview ==
The song was initially composed by Giampiero Artegiani as "A casa di Laura" and pitched to several artists. Silvia Salemi showed interest in the song and contributed to reworking the lyrics. According to Salemi, the first ideas for the new lyrics came by chance from Michele Zarrillo.

The song was Salemi's entry in 47th edition of the Sanremo Music Festival; after passing the eliminations on the first night, the song placed first in the rankings of the third and fourth nights, before ultimately finishing in fourth place. The song marked the breakout of Salemi and became her signature song. It was a commercial success, selling over 30,000 copies.

== Track listing ==
| No. | Title | Writer(s) | Length |
|---|---|---|---|
| 1. | "A casa di Luca" | Giampiero Artegiani, Silvia Salemi | 3:36 |
| 2. | "Danza caotica" | Giampiero Artegiani | 4:05 |
