= Neri per Caso =

Italian a cappella musical group

Neri per Caso are an Italian a cappella musical group.

== Career ==
The group formed in Salerno as Crecason in 1991 and consisted of six elements: Diego and Ciro Caravano (brothers), their cousins Mimì and Gonzalo Caravano (also brothers), Mario Crescenzo and Massimo De Divitiis. The group's name was changed after they met songwriter and producer Claudio Mattone, who saw them performing in Rome all "dressed in black" (in Italian "Neri"). When he asked them why they picked that color and they said it happened purely "by chance" (in Italian "per caso"). In 1995 they won the newcomers section at the Sanremo Music Festival with the song "Le ragazze". Their debut album became platinum after just one week and eventually sold over 700,000 copies. In 1996 they returned to the Sanremo Festival, this time entering the main competition with the song "Mai più sola", and ranked fifth. The subsequent album, Strumenti, sold over 250,000 copies. In 2014 Diego Caravano left the group, being replaced by Moris Pradella, who was replaced by Daniele Blaquier the following year.

== Band members ==
=== Current lineup ===
- Ciro Caravano (1995-current)
- Gonzalo Caravano (1995-current)
- Domenico Pablo "Mimì" Caravano (1995-current)
- Mario Crescenzo (1995-current)
- Massimo de Divitiis (1995-current)
- Daniele Blaquier (2015-current)

=== Former Members ===
- Diego Caravano (1995-2014)
- Moris Pradella (2014-2015)

== Discography ==
Albums

- 1995 - Le ragazze
- 1996 - Strumenti
- 1996 - ...And so This Is Christmas
- 1997 - Neri per caso
- 2000 - Angelo blu
- 2002 - La raccolta
- 2007 - Solo grandi successi
- 2008 - Angoli diversi
- 2010 - Donne
- 2016 – Neri per Caso 2.0
- 2019 - We Love the Beatles

Awards and achievements
Preceded by Andrea Bocelli with "Il mare calmo della sera"	Sanremo Music Festival; Winner Newcomers section 1995	Succeeded by Syria with "Amici come prima"
