= Francesca Alotta =

Italian pop singer

- Born: 1 January 1968 (age 58); Palermo
- Genres: Pop
- Occupation: Singer

Francesca Alotta (born 1 January 1968) is an Italian pop singer, best known for the song "Non amarmi".

== Background ==
Born in Palermo, Alotta started her career in 1988 as a member of the female group Compilations. She started her solo career in 1991, winning the Cantagiro with the song "Chiamata urgente".

In 1992, Alotta won the "Newcomers" section of the Sanremo Music Festival with the song "Non amarmi", a duet with Aleandro Baldi, which later became an international hit with the title "No Me Ames". In 1993 she returned to Sanremo Festival, this time entering the "Big Artists" section, with the song "Un anno di noi". The same year, she was cast in the Rai 1 show Domenica in. In 1997 she entered the music festival "Viva Napoli". In 2004 Alotta was cast in the Rai 2 reality show Music Farm.

== Discography ==
Album

- 1992 – Francesca Alotta
- 1993 – Io e te
- 1997 – Buonanotte alla luna

Awards and achievements
Preceded by Paolo Vallesi with "Le persone inutili"	Sanremo Music Festival; Winner Newcomers section 1992	Succeeded by Laura Pausini with "La solitudine"
