= Stefano Ruffini =

Italian singer and voice actor (1963–2006)

Stefano Ruffini (14 June 1963 in Rome – 7 December 2006 in Naples) was an Italian singer and voice actor.

== Biography ==
He studied singing with Edda Dell'Orso and acting with Silvia Luzi.

During his military service in the air force, he organized music evenings for the non-commissioned officers' club. One of these shows was filmed by Rai 3 and was seen by Grazia Di Michele, who noticed Ruffini's vocal talents.

Di Michele wrote a number of songs for Ruffini, including "Canto bolero" and "Si chiama Hélène", which he performed at the Sanremo Music Festival 1988 and 1989, respectively.
