= Retemia =

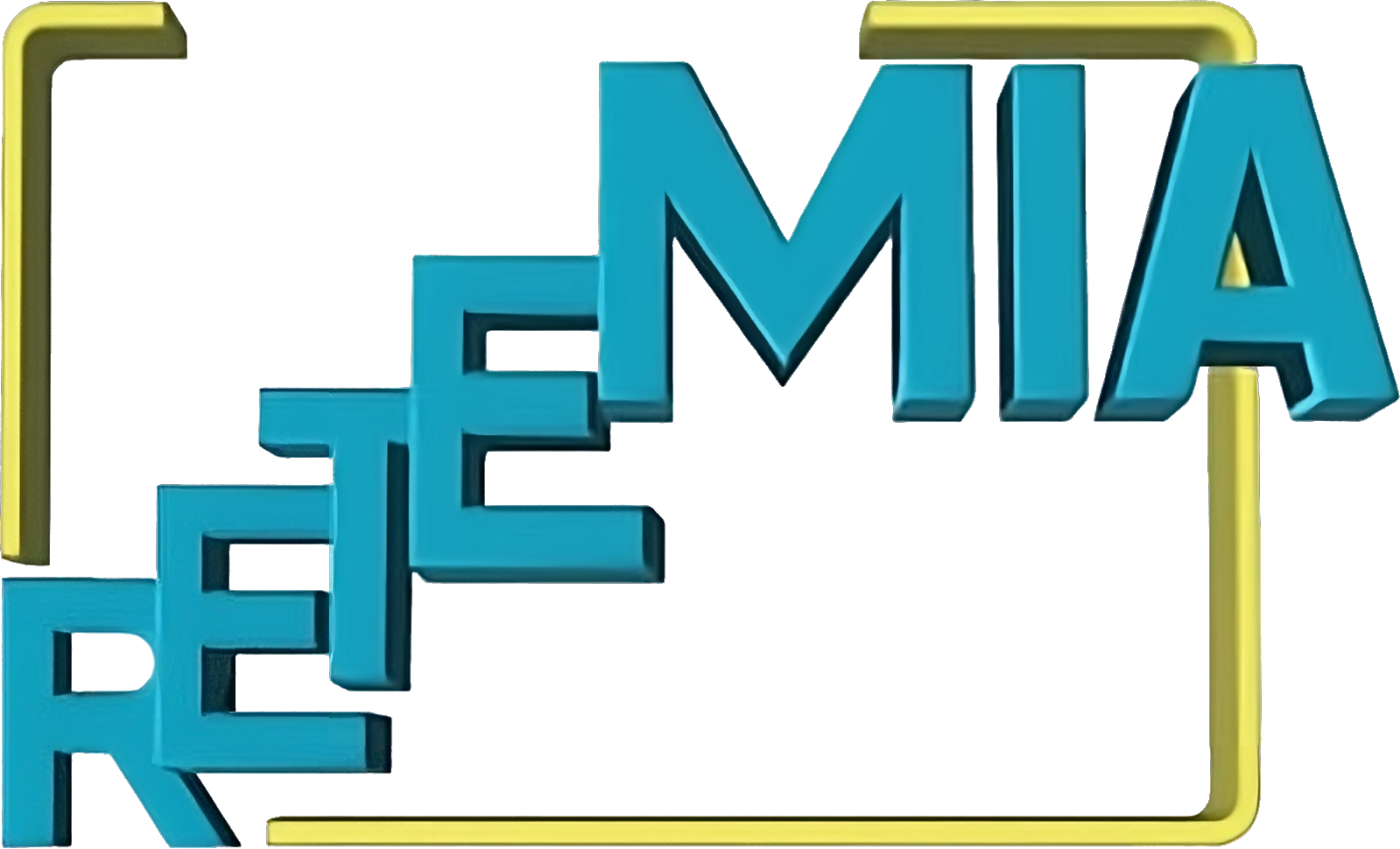
- Country: Italy
- Broadcast area: Italy

Programming
- Language: Italian
- Picture format: 1080i HDTV (downscaled to 576i for the SD feed)

Ownership
- Owner: Editrice 24
- Sister channels: Vuemme; TV Lucca

History
- Launched: 21 March 1988; 38 years ago
- Replaced: Elefante TV

Links
- Website: retemia.eu

Availability

Terrestrial
- Digital terrestrial television: Channel 813 (Lucca)

Retemia (My Network) is an Italian commercial television network broadcasting from the Tuscan city of Lucca. Founded by notable businessman Giorgio Mendella in 1988. In its current incarnation, the channel is owned by Editrice 24, a company set up by local businessmen from the area. The project is led by Riccardo Lucchesi, Editrice 24 coordinator Francesca Di Pietro and content curator Juri Cerri.

== History ==
=== Early years, generalist profile ===
The network was created in 1988 under the ownership of businessman Giorgio Mendella following the buying of the Elefante TV network from which the network took its place, it had a discrete coverage in the Italian peninsula thanks to around twenty affiliated stations. It broadcast from 3200 km2 studios in the city of Lucca. The channel initially offered a generalist schedule with entertainment programs such as Il gioco di Retemia, A domanda risponde and La sfida, news and current affairs such as Sala stampa oltre la notizia and Wip - World Important Person, as well as the health program Ciak Medicina and sports segments such as Zona Cesarini. Some Latin American telenovelas were also broadcast. Pornographic actress Moana Pozzi also had a program on the channel, Frutto proibito. One of its peculiarities was a live hour-long home shopping program, Primomercato. Each week, Mendella offered in his daily program the chance to buy shares in his other assets, such as a hotel under construction, a computer factory, an insurance company or even a publishing company. In January 1990, its overnight arrangement with Super Channel ended.

In a rare coup, the network secured the exclusive rights to Inter Milan's matches in 1989, for the sum of 800 million liras, surpassing competitors RAI and Fininvest. Mendella was eyeing the presidency of Torino and Fiorentina. The Gulf War prompted the network to extend its news operation with daily half-hour updates on the development of the war, being replaced after its conclusion by Primo Piano, a daily newscast.

=== Legislative problems and conversion to a home shopping format ===
The downfall of the network came in 1992, with the failure of obtaining a national channel license under the aegis of the Mammì law passed that year. On the night of August 24, after Mendella fled abroad, the network was declared bankrupt, airing a half-hour video in loop about the network's history ending with a motivational message showing their intent to continue broadcasting ("Dreams can be interrupted for more or less time depending on the intensity of the storm that awoke you, but unlike reality, dreams will always return. We believe in that."), (Note: Original Italian narration: "I sogni possono essere interrotti per più o meno tempo a seconda della forza del temporale che ti ha svegliato; ma a diferenza della realtà i sogni tornano sempre. Noi ci crediamo.") after which its signal was shut down on its 597 transmitters. Mendella was detained in January 1995 and moved to San Vittore.

Broadcasts resumed in March 1993. The previous month, over 2000 shareholders convened at the Lucca Tribunal in order to recoup the network's 18 billion liras in investments, with the aim of regaining a national license, replacing either Telemontecarlo or Telepiù 3, the cultural subscription channel. The network now had a new format, airing primarily home shopping programming.

On July 6, 1995, Retemia launched its teletext service, GT1 (Giornale Telematico 1), outsourced to Acomedia, of commercial vocation and in some aspects, interactive. The network had real time access to certain foreign teletext services (among them CNN International), from Italian news wires (ANSA and Dire) as well as other services and games. GT1 operated mainly using subscriptions. Its teletext, renamed MIAVIDEO in 1997, closed in 2000.

=== Foreign interests take over ===
On April 17, 1997, the Scandinavian media conglomerate SBS Broadcasting Group acquired a 10% stake in Retemia, with the option of buying the remaining 90% within a two-year window. Corriere della Sera reported that if SBS intended to buy all of its shares, the channel would become a generalist outlet. In March 1998, Barry Diller announced his intent to buy the channel and set up an HSN-SBS joint operation for its management. The deal depended on Italian legislation, which, if passed, would limit home shopping channels to digital satellite, a relatively underdeveloped television sector at the time. The HSN-SBS Italia network was set to begin airing its services on the Retemia terrestrial network, which was available in fourteen million households. At the end of November, La Repubblica reported that the deal was likely to fail, as Italian legislation of the time forbade non-European companies from owning or buying a broadcaster. HSN was seen as the larger partner in the deal.

Thomas Kirch's Home Order Television came in June 1999 and announced its intent to shake up the administrative structure, with Kirch himself owning 51% of the company, SBS, 45% and HSN 4%. In the summer of 2000, Retemia-HOT was denied having a broadcasting license.

=== Judicial interference, end of operations and sale to HOT ===
In 2000, the network was already operating in association with Home Order Television, owned by Thomas Kirch (son of German media mogul Leo Kirch) and aimed to remove the Retemia brand, becoming HOT Italia, by the end of the year. At the same time, MTV Italia (which would later take over the TMC2 network) repeatedly applied for one of the eight national licenses without success. HOT was intended to do so. Retemia's owner Profit Group wanted to enter the multichannel landscape, while Retemia's license was not renewed by orders of the Communications Minister of Italy. Profit Group offered 30 billion lire for the sale of the network to HOT. The case was later taken to the courts. In January 2001, it was announced that Retemia was to be replaced by HOT Italia and had its assets sold to HOT's German parent company.

=== Return under Editrice 24 ===
Rumors emerged of the return of Retemia in July 2015, this time as a general interest station, like it was at the beginning of its operation, but there were still uncertainties regarding the situation. There was a judicial dispute between Mendella and the new owners, which in December 2015, led to Mendella creating his own network, 6Mia TV. The station closed in 2017 before being replaced by a new station, TV&TV, that existed between 2018 and 2020.

On February 29, 2020, Retemia resumed its own operations under the control of a Luccan company called Editrice 24. The new Rete Mia specializes primarily in old TV series and movies, which, in the words of the new owners, "run the risk of being lost forever". The new phase lacks infomercials, erotic programming and scandals, with the aim of recovering what Italian television lost over time. The channel airs news provided by the Dire agency and the Italian service of Euronews, as well as sports and lifestyle programming produced in Tuscany. In November 2022, the network announced a new slot dedicated to old erotic movies, NottErotica, on Friday nights.
