= Portami a ballare =

Single by Luca Barbarossa

from the album Cuore d'acciaio
- B-side: "Ho fatto l'eroe"
- Released: February 1992
- Genre: Pop
- Length: 3:44
- Label: CBS / Columbia Records
- Songwriter(s): Luca Barbarossa

Luca Barbarossa singles chronology
"Al di là del muro" (1989)	"Portami a ballare" (1992)	"Cellai solo te" (1994)

Audio
- "Portami a ballare" on YouTube

Portami a ballare (lit. 'Take me to dance') is a 1992 Italian song written and performed by singer-songwriter Luca Barbarossa.

This song won the 42nd edition of the Sanremo Music Festival. It deal with a common theme of the Sanremo Festival, especially in its 1950s editions, i.e. the love for the mothers, but the ambiguous lyrics initially suggest it being a classic love song, and only slowly and gradually show the true subject of the song.

== Track listing ==
No.	Title	Length
1.	"Portami a ballare"	3:44
2.	"Ho fatto l'eroe"	4:38

== Charts ==
Chart	Peak position
Europe (European Hot 100 Singles)	81
Italy (Musica e dischi)	4
