= Giampiero Artegiani =

Italian singer-songwriter, lyricist, and producer (1955–2019)

- Born: 14 May 1955; Rome, Italy
- Died: 4 February 2019 (aged 63); Rome
- Occupations: Singer-songwriter; Lyricist

Giampiero Artegiani (14 May 1955 – 4 February 2019) was an Italian singer-songwriter, lyricist and producer.

== Life and career ==
Born in Rome, at ten years old Artegiani learned to play banjo and guitar. In 1972 he joined the progressive rock group Semiramis, and after the band disbanded he worked several years as a music therapist. In the late 1970s he founded the pop band I Carillon, and in the early 1980s he started a solo career as a singer-songwriter. In 1983 he won Un disco per l'estate with the song "Storia di un buffone".

In 1984 and 1986 Artegiani participated at the Sanremo Music Festival, with the critically well-received songs "Acqua alta in piazza San Marco" and "Le rondini sfioravano il grano". From the late 1980s on Artegiani focused his activities into producing and composing lyrics for other artists, notably Michele Zarrillo ("Come un giorno di sole", "L'ultimo film insieme"), Peppino Di Capri ("Comme è ddoce 'o mare") and Silvia Salemi ("A casa di Luca"). His song "Perdere l'amore", performed by Massimo Ranieri, won the 38th edition of the Sanremo Music Festival.
