= Aleandro Baldi =

Italian singer-songwriter and composer (born 1959)

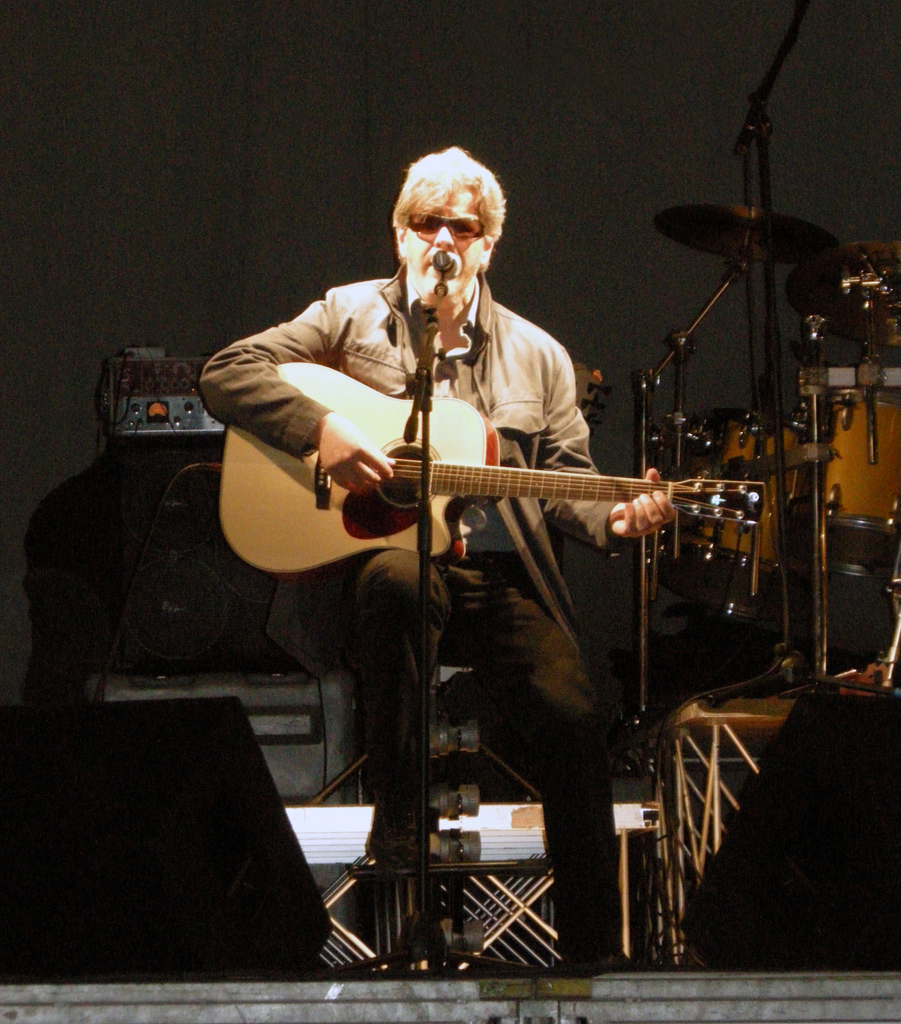
- Photograph of Baldi performing
- Born: Aleandro Civai; 11 April 1959 (age 67); Greve in Chianti, Florence
- Occupation: singer-songwriter

Aleandro Baldi (born 11 April 1959) is an Italian singer-songwriter and composer.

== Life and career ==
Born in Greve in Chianti, Florence as Aleandro Civai, blind, Baldi began playing the guitar as an autodidact while he was at the Reggio Emilia College for the Blind. He debuted in 1986, entering the Sanremo Music Festival with "La nave va", a song he composed and arranged, ranking second in the "Newcomers" section. He later won the Newcomers section of the Festival in 1992, in a duet with Francesca Alotta, with the song "Non amarmi", which later became an international hit with the title "No Me Ames". In 1994 Baldi won again the Sanremo Festival, this time in its "Big Artists" section, with the song "Passerà"; the song was covered by the group Il Divo in their debut album. In 1994, Baldi also released an autobiographical book, Il sole dentro, written in collaboration with Marcello Lazzerini.

Outside of his musical career, Baldi is also a massophysiotherapist.

== Discography ==
=== Album ===
- 1987 - Aleandro Baldi
- 1989 - E sia così
- 1992 - Il sole
- 1994 - Ti chiedo onestà
- 1996 - Tu sei me
- 2002 - Il meglio e il nuovo
- 2007 - Liberamente tratto
- 2010 - Italian Love Songs

Awards and achievements
Preceded by Paolo Vallesi with "Le persone inutili"	Sanremo Music Festival; Winner Newcomers section 1992	Succeeded by Laura Pausini with "La solitudine"
Preceded by Enrico Ruggeri with "Mistero"	Sanremo Music Festival; Winner; 1994	Succeeded by Giorgia with "Come saprei"
