= Paolo Vallesi =

Italian singer-songwriter (born 1964)

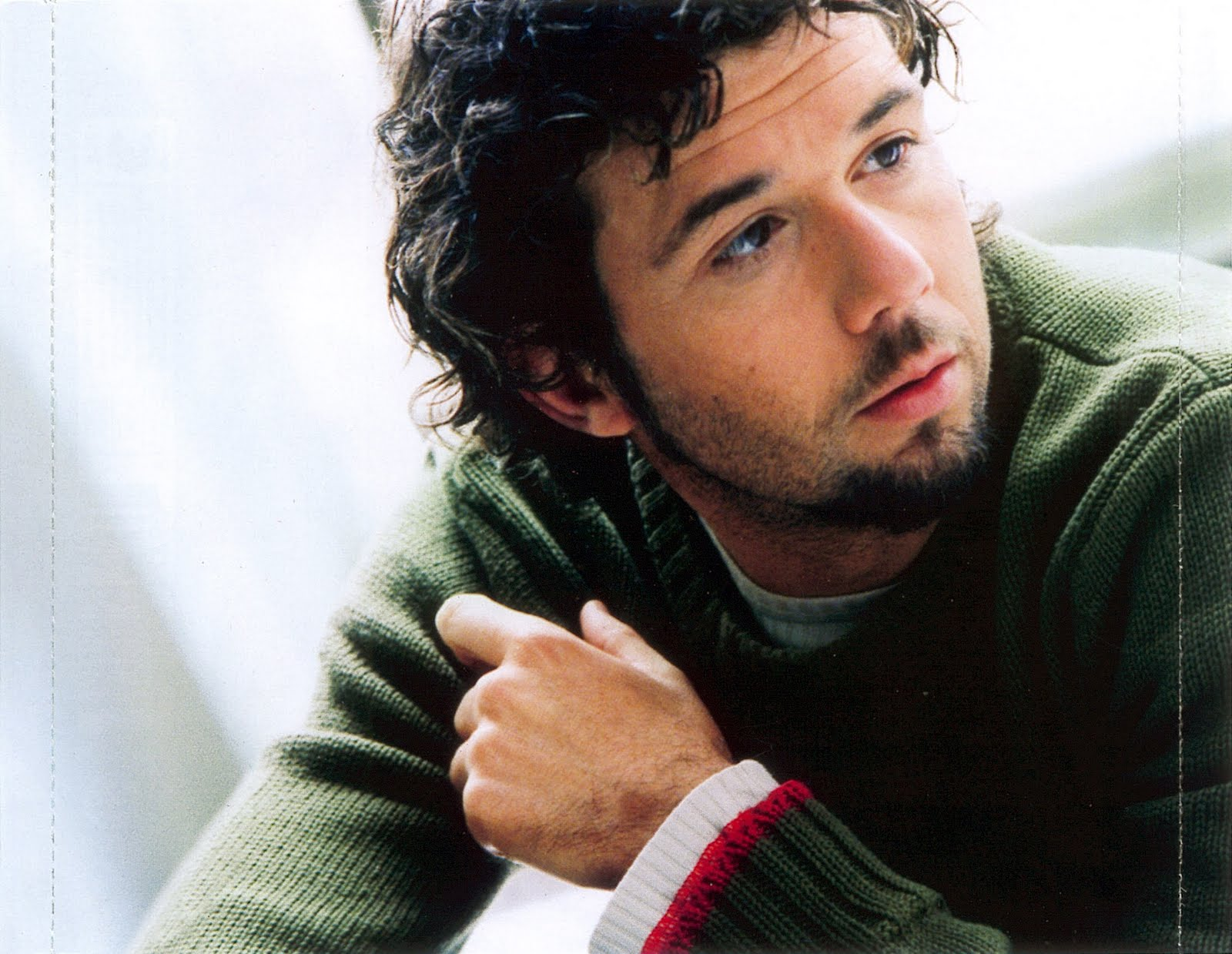
- Vallesi in 2015
- Born: 18 May 1964 (age 62); Florence, Tuscany, Italy
- Occupation: Singer-songwriter

Paolo Vallesi (born 18 May 1964) is an Italian singer-songwriter.

== Background ==
Born in Florence, Vallesi began studying piano as a child and he later started working as an arranger and a composer. Put under contract by Caterina Caselli, in 1991 he had his breakout with the song "Le persone inutili" which won the newcomer section at the Sanremo Music Festival and with his first album, Paolo Vallesi, which was a commercial success. The following year he came back to the Sanremo Festival, this time in its "Big Artists" section, ranking third with the song "La forza della vita", which peaked first on the Italian hit parade. Following the sales dropping of his 1996 album Vallesi considerably slowed his musical activities in the following years. In 2005 he was a contestant in La Talpa, the Italian celebrity version of the reality series The Mole.

== Discography ==
Album

- 1991 - Paolo Vallesi
- 1992 - La forza della vita
- 1994 - Non mi tradire
- 1996 - Non essere mai grande
- 1999 - Sabato 17:45
- 2002 - Felici di essere (collection with 3 new songs)
- 2015 - Episodio 1...In questo mondo

Awards and achievements
Preceded by Marco Masini with "Disperato"	Sanremo Music Festival; Winner Newcomers section 1991	Succeeded by Aleandro Baldi & Francesca Alotta with "Non amarmi"
