= Silvia Salemi =

Italian composer (born 1978)

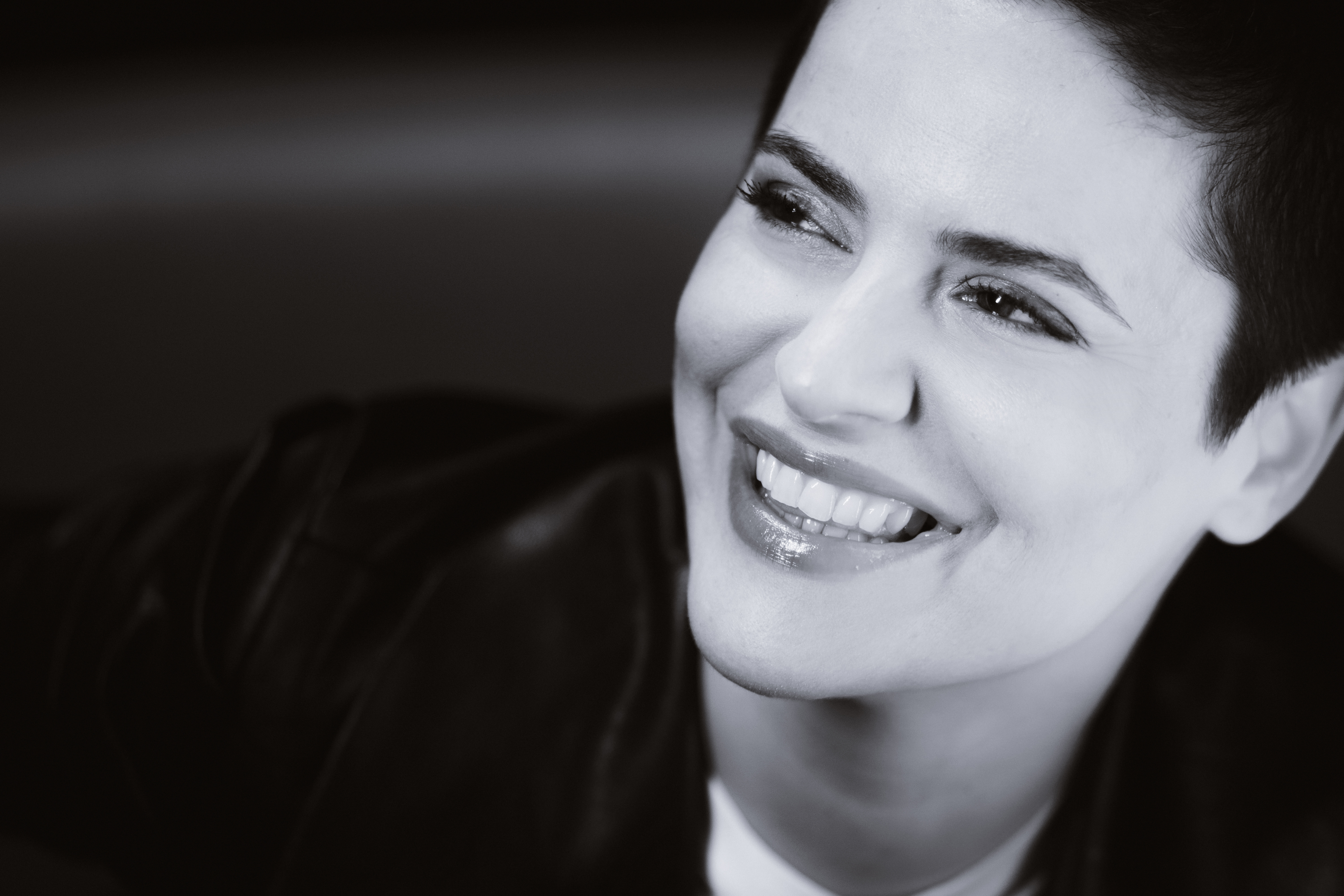
- Salemi in 2019
- Born: 2 April 1978 (age 47); Palazzolo Acreide, Syracuse, Italy
- Occupation: singer-songwriter

Silvia Salemi (born 2 April 1978) is an Italian singer-songwriter and television personality.

== Life and career ==
Born in Palazzolo Acreide, Syracuse, in 1995 Salemi won the Castrocaro Music Festival with the song "Con questo sentimento".

In 1996 she entered the Sanremo Music Festival with the song "Quando il cuore", ranking at fifth place in the "Newcomers" section. A year later she returned to Sanremo Festival, this time entering the "Big Artists" section, with the song "A casa di Luca", ranking fourth and obtaining both a critical and commercial success. She entered into the Sanremo Festival two more times, in 1998 with the song "Pathos" and in 2003 with "Il cuore delle donne".

In 1998 Salemi co-hosted, alongside Pippo Baudo, the Canale 5 variety show Il gran ballo delle debuttanti. In 1999, she hosted the Rai 3 religious themed program Viaggi nei luoghi del sacro. In 2004 she took part to the Rai 2 reality show Music Farm. In 2013, she was cast in Tale e quale show, the Italian version of the Your Face Sounds Familiar franchise.

== Discography ==
=== Album ===
- 1996 – Silvia Salemi
- 1997 – Caotica
- 1998 – Pathos
- 2000 – L'arancia
- 2003 – Gioco del Duende
- 2007 – Il mutevole abitante del mio solito involucro
- 2017 – 23

=== Selected singles ===
- 1996 – "Nessuno mi può giudicare"
- 1996 – "Quando il cuore"
- 1997 – "A casa di Luca"
- 1997 – "Stai con me stanotte"
- 1998 – "Pathos"
- 1998 – "Odiami perché"
- 2000 – "La parola amore"
- 2000 – "E ci batteva il sole"
- 2002 – "J'adore"
- 2003 – "Nel cuore delle donne"
- 2003 – "Dimenticami"
- 2007 – "Il mutevole abitante del mio solito involucro"
- 2009 – "Commessa commossa"
- 2012 – "Amore disperato"
- 2017 – "Potrebbe essere"
