= No Me Ames =

1999 single

- Artwork for promotional release

Single by Jennifer Lopez and Marc Anthony

from the album On the 6
- A-side: "If You Had My Love"
- Released: May 11, 1999
- Recorded: 1998
- Studio: Crescent Moon Studios (Miami, FL); Sony Music Studios (New York, NY)
- Genre: Latin pop; salsa
- Length: 4:39 (ballad version); 5:04 (tropical remix)
- Label: Work; Sony Discos
- Songwriters: Giancarlo Bigazzi; Marco Falagiani; Aleandro Baldi; Ignacio Ballesteros
- Producers: Emilio Estefan Jr.; Dan Shea; Juan Vincente Zambrano

Jennifer Lopez singles chronology
"If You Had My Love" (1999)	"No Me Ames" (1999)	"Waiting for Tonight" (1999)

Marc Anthony singles chronology
"No Sabes Como Duele" (1999)	"No Me Ames" (1999)	"I Need to Know" (1999)

Music video
- "No Me Ames" on YouTube

"No Me Ames" (English: "Don't Love Me") is a Latin pop duet recorded by American singers Jennifer Lopez and Marc Anthony for Lopez's debut studio album, On the 6 (1999). It is a Spanish cover version of the Italian song "Non amarmi", written by Giancarlo Bigazzi, Marco Falagiani and Aleandro Baldi and recorded by Baldi and Francesca Alotta for Baldi's album Il Sole (1993). The song was translated into Spanish by Ignacio Ballesteros at Anthony's request. Two versions of the song were produced for On the 6; one as a ballad and the other as a salsa. The ballad version was produced by Dan Shea, while the salsa version was arranged and produced by Juan Vicente Zambrano. The music video was directed by Kevin Bray and received a nomination for the Latin Grammy Award for Best Short Form Music Video. It served as the encore during the couple's co-headlining tour in 2007.

"No Me Ames" speaks of a complicated relationship between two lovers. It was first released by Work Records on May 11, 1999, as a B-side to "If You Had My Love" (1999). The work received generally positive reviews from critics. The song peaked at number one in the Billboard Hot Latin Songs chart. It received a nomination for the Latin Grammy Award for Best Pop Performance by a Duo/Group with Vocals. At the 2000 Billboard Latin Music Awards, the song received an award for Hot Latin Track of the Year by a Vocal Duo and two nominations for Tropical/Salsa Track of the Year and Hot Latin Track of the Year. It also received an award for Salsa Song of the Year at the American Society of Composers, Authors and Publishers Awards of 2000.

== Background ==
"No Me Ames" is a cover of the chart-topping Italian song "Non amarmi", originally recorded by Aleandro Baldi and Francesca Alotta for Baldi's album Il Sole (1993). "Non amarmi" was issued as a single in 1992. The song speaks of a complicated relationship between two lovers. It was written by Giancarlo Bigazzi, Marco Falagiani and Baldi, and was later adapted into Spanish by Ignacio Ballesteros. The song peaked number 71 on the Eurochart Hot 100 Singles on the week ending April 4, 1992. It also won the "Newcomers" section of the 1992 Sanremo Music Festival. The first Spanish version of the song was released by Mexican singer Yuri and her husband Rodrigo Espinoza with different lyrics titled "Hoy Que Estamos Juntos" ("Now That We're Together") on her album Huellas (1997).

One day, whilst working on On the 6, Jennifer Lopez "happened to be" recording at the same recording studio where American recording artist Marc Anthony was recording. Anthony, who had become intrigued by Lopez after seeing her in Selena (1997), came into her studio and asked her to appear in the music video for his song "No Me Conoces". She agreed, but only if he recorded a song with her, to which he in turn agreed. Lopez recalled the events on her Feelin' So Good video album by stating: "So at that time I called Tommy [Mottola] and I'm like 'Look, so Marc Anthony said he would do a song and I really don't want to do a duet with just anybody, I want to do a duet with him. So can you force him to sign something, so he has to do a record with me? If I do this video!'". The two first shot the video and then began working on the song.

According to Lopez, Anthony had the idea to translate "Non amarmi", an "old Italian song", into Spanish. Two versions of the songs were produced for On the 6, a ballad and a salsa production. The ballad was produced by Dan Shea, while the other was produced by Juan Vicente Zambrano. Lopez stated: "I don't want to be straight Latin! I want it to be more like, y'know, dance-y music-y".

== Chart performance ==
The song was released on May 11, 1999, as a B-side to "If You Had My Love". The song was promoted by Sony Discos, who released both versions of the song in their respective radio formats. "No Me Ames" debuted in the Billboard Hot Latin Songs chart at number 23 in the week of May 15, 1999, climbing to the top ten three weeks later. The song peaked atop the chart for the week of June 26, 1999, replacing "Livin' la Vida Loca" by Ricky Martin and was succeeded by "Bailamos", by Spanish singer-songwriter Enrique Iglesias, two weeks later. The song returned to number one on the week of July 3, 1999, lasting five weeks until it was displaced by Alejandro Fernández's "Loco". "No Me Ames" ended 1999 as the third best performing Latin track of the year in the United States.

On the Billboard Latin Pop Songs chart, the song debuted at number seven for the week of June 5, 1999. The song peaked at number two four weeks later for the week of June 26, 1999, where it remained for seven weeks. On the year-end charts, the song was the eighth best-performing Latin pop track of the year. On the Billboard Tropical Songs, "No Me Ames" entered the top ten on the week of May 29, 1999. The song peaked at the top of the chart, replacing "Pintame" by Elvis Crespo for the week of July 3, 1999, and remained atop the chart for five weeks until it was succeeded by Gilberto Santa Rosa's "Dejate Querer" for the week of August 14, 1999. On the year-end charts, "No Me Ames" was the second best-performing Tropical Song of 1999 after "El Niágara en Bicicleta", by Juan Luis Guerra.

The salsa version of the song was featured as a bonus track on the European edition of Lopez's remix album J to tha L–O! The Remixes (2002) and on Anthony's 1999 compilation Desde un Principio: From the Beginning. The ballad version was featured on Anthony's 2006 compilation album Sigo Siendo Yo: Grandes Exitos.

== Reception and accolades ==
In her review of On the 6, Heather Phares of AllMusic commented that the tropical version of "No Me Ames" was one of the two songs that "emphasize Lopez's distinctive heritage". In his review of Desde un Principio: From the Beginning, Jose Promis also from AllMusic praised the song as "surpisingly good". Mario Tarradell of the Dallas Morning News remarked "No Me Ames" as an "island flavored" song. Lauri Mascia of the Sun-Sentinel expressed disappointment over the song and felt that the tropical version did not fit the album. NME listed the ballad version as one of the "potentially offensive slushy ballads" on the album. Baldi cited Lopez and Anthony's cover as one of the two that encouraged him to come out of retirement to record another album.

At the 2000 Billboard Latin Music Awards, "No Me Ames" received an award for Hot Latin Track of the Year by a Vocal Duo and two nominations for Tropical/Salsa Track of the Year and Hot Latin Track of the Year. In the same year, the song led to the duo receiving a nomination for Pop Group or Duo of the Year at the 12th Lo Nuestro Awards. At the 1st Annual Latin Grammy Awards, the song received a nomination for Best Pop Performance by a Duo/Group with Vocals. In 2000, the song received an award for Salsa Song of the Year at the American Society of Composers, Authors and Publishers Awards of 2000. At the 2004 Premios Juventud, "No Me Ames" was nominated in the category for "La Más Pegajosa" ("Catchiest Tune").

== Promotion ==
Lopez and Anthony performing "No Me Ames" at Madison Square Garden. This was Lopez's first live performance of the song.

While Lopez and Anthony were recording the song, Lopez came up with the video concept. Lopez recalled the events by stating: "And I asked him [Anthony] if he liked it. And I actually explained it to Tommy and him at the same time another day in the studio after the song was recorded and they both loved it." The music video for "No Me Ames" was directed by Kevin Bray in Los Angeles, California, the day after she shot the music video for "If You Had My Love". The video features Lopez and Anthony as two lovers. Anthony dies of an unnamed illness. His spirit watches over a grieving Lopez. Of the video, Lopez stated that it is "like a foreign movie, like Life Is Beautiful". The music video received a nomination for the Latin Grammy Award for Best Short Form Music Video. The music video was included on the DVD set for Lopez's compilation album, The Reel Me (2003).

The song was scheduled to be performed at the first annual Latin Grammy Awards, but Anthony was unable to attend due to complications with his wife Dayanara Torres' pregnancy. As part of their 2007 co-headlining concert tour, the song was performed as an encore along with "Por Arriesgarnos" after each show. Lopez and Anthony performed the song at the final show of Lopez's Dance Again World Tour.

== Formats and track listings ==
"If You Had My Love" US CD single
No.	Title	Length
1.	"If You Had My Love"	4:28
2.	"No Me Ames" (Tropical Remix)	5:05
Total length:		9:28

Promotional CD single
No.	Title	Length
1.	"No Me Ames"	4:42
2.	"No Me Ames" (Tropical Remix)	5:04
Total length:		9:41

== Credits and personnel ==
The credits are adapted from the On the 6 liner notes.

- Giancarlo Bigazzi – songwriter
- Aleandro Baldi – songwriter
- Marco Falagiani – songwriter
- Ignacio Ballesteros – songwriter (Spanish adaption)
- Jennifer Lopez – lead vocals
- Marc Anthony – lead vocals

Ballad version

- Konesha Owens – background vocals
- Claytoven Richardson – background vocals
- Dan Shea – keyboard, programming, vocal recording engineer, pro-tools editing
- Dean Parks – nylon & Steel String Guitar
- Michaal Landau – electric guitar

Tropical remix

- Emilio Estefan – executive producer
- Dan Shea – vocal producer, keyboard, rhythm programming
- Juan Vincente Zambrano – producer, arrangement, programming, keyboard
- José Miguel Velásquez – background vocals
- Lena Perez – background vocals
- Ximera DePombo – background vocals
- Jorges Velaro – background vocals
- Manual Lopez – guitar
- Salvador Cuevas – bass
- Edwin Bonilla – percussion
- Archie Peña – percussion
- Douglas Guevara – bongo, conga
- Herman "Teddy" Mulet – trombone

== Charts ==
=== Weekly charts ===
Chart (1999)	Position
Costa Rica (Notimex)	1
El Salvador (Notimex)	1
Guatemala (Notimex)	2
Honduras (Notimex)	1
Nicaragua (Notimex)	1
Mexico (Notimex)	1
Puerto Rico (Notimex)	1
Panama (Notimex)	1
US Hot Latin Songs (Billboard)	1
US Latin Pop Airplay (Billboard)	2
US Tropical Airplay (Billboard)	1

=== Year-end charts ===
Chart (1999)	Position
Romania (Romanian Top 100)	15
US Latin Songs (Billboard)	3
US Latin Pop Songs (Billboard)	8
US Tropical Songs (Billboard)	2

== Certifications ==
Region	Certification	Certified units/sales
Mexico (AMPROFON)	Gold	30,000^{‡}
^{‡} Sales+streaming figures based on certification alone.

== See also ==
- Billboard Top Latin Songs Year-End Chart
- List of number-one Billboard Hot Latin Tracks of 1999
- List of Billboard Tropical Airplay number ones of 1999
