= Gabriella Carlucci =

Italian television presenter and politician (born 1959)

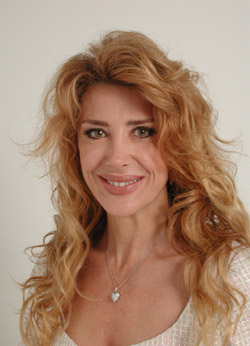
- Carlucci in 2006

Deputy of the Italian Republic
- In office 30 May 2001 – 14 March 2013
- Parliamentary group: Forza Italia (2001–2009); PdL (2009–2011); UdC (2011–2013)
- Constituency: Apulia

Mayor of Margherita di Savoia
- In office 29 March 2010 – 1 October 2012

Personal details
- Born: 28 February 1959 (age 67) Alghero, Sardinia, Italy
- Relatives: Milly Carlucci (sister)
- Education: Sapienza University of Rome
- Occupation: Television presenter; politician

Gabriella Carlucci (born 28 February 1959) is an Italian television presenter and politician.

== Life and career ==
Born in Alghero, the sister of the actress and presenter Milly, Carlucci got two degrees, in art history and in foreign languages and literature. She started her television career in 1983, as an assistant of Enzo Tortora in the Rai 1 show Portobello. Among her most important television credits, she hosted two editions of the Sanremo Music Festival (1988 and 1990), the Saturday night RAI show Luna di miele (1992-1993), and the Sunday afternoon Canale 5 show Buona Domenica (1993–1995).

In 1999 Carlucci embraced politics, becoming the head of the entertainment and cultural heritage department of Forza Italia. She was elected deputy with the Forza Italia party in 2001 and in 2006, and in 2008 with The People of Freedom party. She left the party in 2011 to join the Union of the Centre. She run again in the 2013 general elections with the Union of the Centre and in 2018 with Us with Italy, without being elected. She served as mayor of Margherita di Savoia between 2010 and 2012, when she resigned.
