= Perdere l'amore =

Single by Massimo Ranieri

from the album Perdere l'amore
- B-side: "Dove sta il poeta"
- Released: 1988
- Genre: Chanson, Pop
- Label: WEA
- Songwriter(s): Marcello Marrocchi, Giampiero Artegiani

Massimo Ranieri singles chronology
"Dal primo momento che ti ho vista" (1976)	"Perdere l'amore" (1988)	"Io lavoro di notte" (1988)

Audio
- "Perdere l'amore" on YouTube

"Perdere l'amore" is a 1988 song composed by Marcello Marrocchi and Giampiero Artegiani and performed by singer Massimo Ranieri. The song won the 38th edition of the Sanremo Music Festival, and marked the return to music of Ranieri after a decade devoted to acting.

The song had been already proposed by Gianni Nazzaro to the Sanremo Festival organizers in 1987, but had been rejected in the preliminary song selection.

"Perdere l'amore" was covered by several artists, including Lara Fabian, André Hazes, Mino Reitano, Pietro Ballo, Thiago Arancam. In 2020 Ranieri recorded a new version of the song in duet with Tiziano Ferro, which was presented out of competition at the Sanremo Music Festival 2020.

== Track listing ==
- 7" single
1. "Perdere l'amore" (Marcello Marrocchi, Giampiero Artegiani)
2. "Dove sta il poeta" (Marcello Marrocchi, Giampiero Artegiani)

== Charts ==
=== Weekly charts ===
Chart (1988)	Peak position
Italy	1
Italy Airplay (Music & Media)	1

=== Year-end charts ===
Chart (1988)	Peak position
Italy	16
