= Nuova Compagnia di Canto Popolare =

Italian folk group

The Nuova Compagnia di Canto Popolare (literally "New Company of Folk Song"), also known by the acronym NCCP, is an Italian folk group, founded in Naples in 1969.

== History ==
The musical project was founded by musicians Eugenio Bennato, Carlo D’Angiò, and Giovanni Mauriello with the aim of research and spread ancient traditional music from Campania and more generally from South Italy. Thanks to the encounter with the ethnomusicologist Roberto De Simone, the group eventually focused their research on Neapolitan vocal genres from the 15th and 16th centuries such as tammuriate, fronne, and serenate.

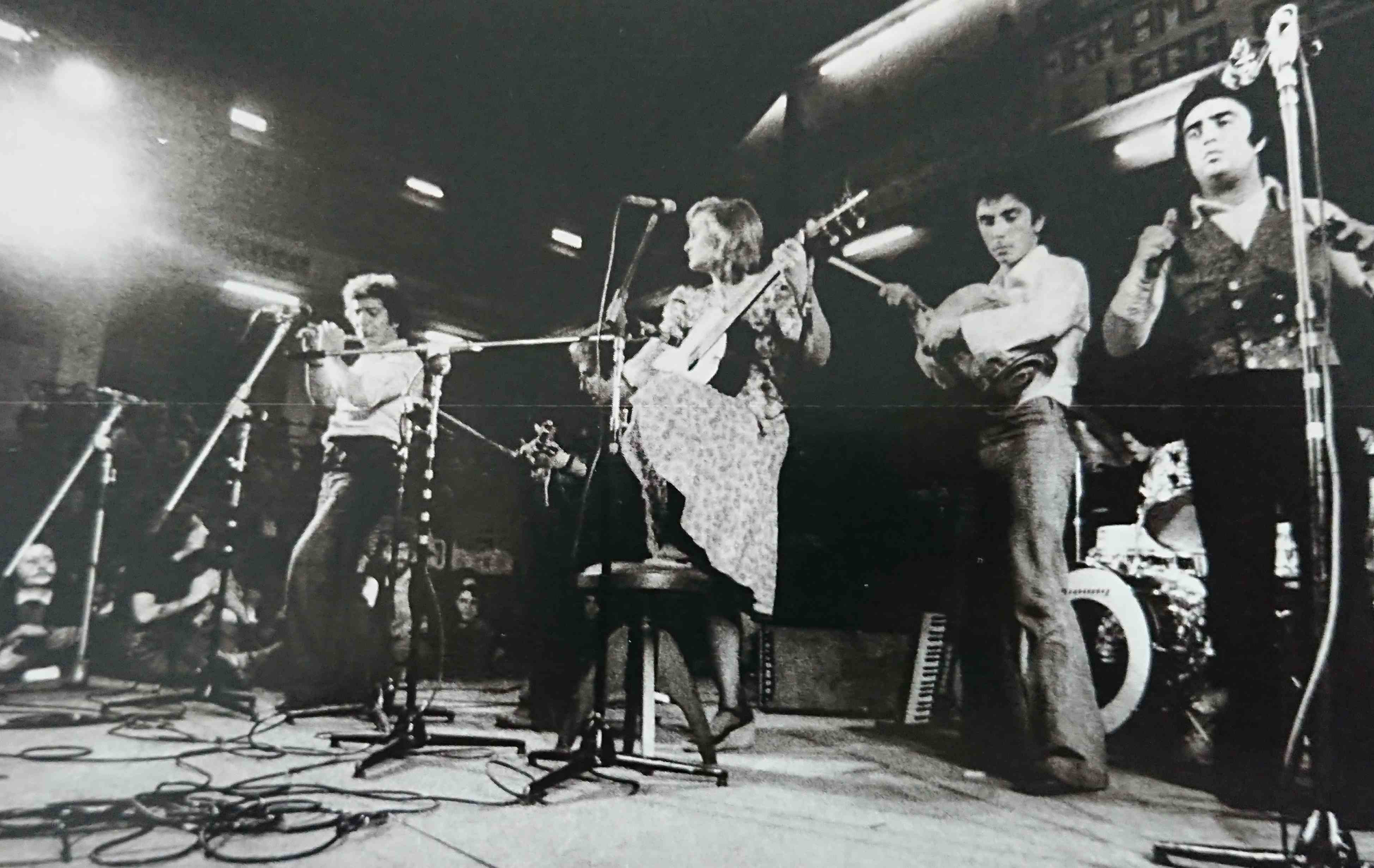
Nuova Compagnia di Canto Popolare in 1976

NCCP made their discographic debut in 1971 with a self-titled critically acclaimed album, in which they recuperated lost songs which had survived only in the form of ancient manuscripts and used forgotten musical instruments such as tammorra and mandoloncello. In 1972, they made their live debut at the Festival of Two Worlds in Spoleto and then started an intense theatrical activity. While new components joined the project, the same year D'angiò left the group, followed by the departure of Bennato in 1976. The same year the couple founded the musical project Musicanova, while NCCP got a large success thanks to the De Simone's musical "La Gatta Cenerentola".

Passing through various lineup changes, in the 1980s NCCP slowed their activities, recording only an album in eleven years. They had a resurgence in the early 1990s, in conjunction with the rise of the world music genre, when they upstaged their activity of research and embraced a production of original music.

In 1992 NCCP entered the competition at the 42nd edition of the Sanremo Music Festival, winning the critic's award with the song "Pe' dispietto". In the following years, collaborated with several artists including Angelo Branduardi and Zulù, participated to the 48th Sanremo Music Festival with the song "Sotto il velo del cielo", and toured extensively.

== Discography ==
Album

- 1971: Nuova Compagnia di Canto Popolare (Rare, RAR LP 55011)
- 1973: NCCP (EMI Italiana, 3C064-17900)
- 1974: Li sarracini adorano lu sole (EMI Italiana, 3C064-18026)
- 1975: Tarantella ca nun va 'bbona (EMI Italiana, 3C064-18133)
- 1976: La gatta Cenerentola (EMI Italiana, 3C064-18215/216
- 1977: 11 mesi e 29 giorni (EMI Italiana, 3C064-18295)
- 1977: La cantata dei pastori (EMI Italiana, 3C064-18300)
- 1978: Aggio girato lu munno (EMI Italiana, 3C064-18368)
- 1981: Storie di Fantanasia (Panarecord)
- 1992: Medina (CGD)
- 1995: Tzigari (CGD)
- 1996: InCanto Acustico (CGD)
- 1998: Pesce d' 'o Mare (EMI Italiana)
- 2001: La Voce del Grano (Forrest Hill Records)
- 2005: Candelora (Rai Trade)
- 2011: Live in Munich (Panclassics)
- 2016: 50 anni in buona compagnia (FoxBand)
