= Giorgio Mendella =

Italian businessman and criminal (1953–2026)

Giorgio Mendella (2 March 1953 – 19 February 2026) was an Italian businessman, sports manager and fraudster. His fortunes accumulated in the late 1980s with the creation of his own TV channel, Retemia.

== Life and career ==
Born in Monza but living in Viareggio by adoption, he graduated as an electrical engineer and subsequently studied computer science and economics as a self-taught.

He first worked as a delivery boy at an art gallery whose owner, at the end of the 1970s, proposed that he appear on the screens of Bergamo TV to take care of television sales of paintings and other works of art.

In the 1980s he founded his own television station, Rete Mia, in Lucca, and later, at the turn of the following decade, he created the Intermercato group, a holding company that controlled dozens of companies, with a turnover estimated, according to data reported by the press of the time, at over 1 billion lire. In addition to Rete Mia, Mendella owned the companies Capitalfinanziaria, Domovideo, Fin Versilia, Publimercato '90, Interco, Mias Assicurazioni and many others, including the Viareggio football team. At the Pini stadium in Viareggio, Mendella periodically organized conventions with thousands of members/investors; according to what was reported by the Giornale, in 1989, he was the creator of the first public company in Italy.

He later entered the free telephony market with a telecommunications satellite, founding the Primosat Corporation company based in Viareggio.

When the Berlin Wall fell, it entered the Eastern European markets with commercial, real estate and tourism initiatives; opened a supermarket in Bucharest that sold Western goods in the local currency.

His involvement with Rete Mia led to the acquisition of ASD Viareggio Calcio, which won the 1989–90 Serie D and almost ascended to Serie C2 in the following season. Mendella's management of the team included several players who would later play for larger teams, such as future FC Juventus manager Luciano Spalletti.

Mendella died from complications of surgery on 19 February 2026, at the age of 73.

=== Lawsuits ===
In 1991, Mendella was indicted for a series of crimes, including criminal association, fraud, abusive solicitation of public savings, abusive practice of the banking profession and false accounting.

The Rete Mia experience ended in 1999, when the Court of Lucca convicted Mendella of fraudulent bankruptcy, partly absolving him of the other crimes and partly declaring that prescription had occurred.

The reasons for the conviction issued by the Lucca court indicated the sum attributed to it, as "used for personal purposes", in the amount of 984 million lire.

== Bibliografia ==
- Luigi Simari (2026). La Grammatica della Persuasione: storia di un uomo che sfiorò il sole e ne pagò il prezzo. Punti Cardinali. [Edizioni Contrasto]. ISBN 979-1224734604.
