= Gianni Ippoliti =

Italian television presenter, television writer, actor and writer

- Born: 22 February 1950 (age 75); Rome, Italy
- Occupation: Presenter

Gianni Ippoliti (born 22 February 1950) is an Italian television presenter, television writer, actor and essayist.

== Life and career ==
Born in Rome, a former football referee and a graduate in sociology, in 1979 Ippoliti was part of the short-lived disco duo Craabs.

After some minor roles in RAI variety shows, in the mid-1980s Ippoliti started his career as a television writer and presenter with the show Provini, first broadcast on a Roman local station and later on Italia 1. He had his breakout in 1988 with Dibattito!, a parody of talk shows, which was both a critical and ratings success, and which generated several spin-offs.

In 1993, Ippoliti made his acting debut in the stage play Non e' mai troppo tardi. Since 2011, he hosts a segment of the RAI morning show Unomattina in famiglia, presenting a press review that parodies gossip magazines.
