= Ron (singer) =

Italian singer-songwriter and musician

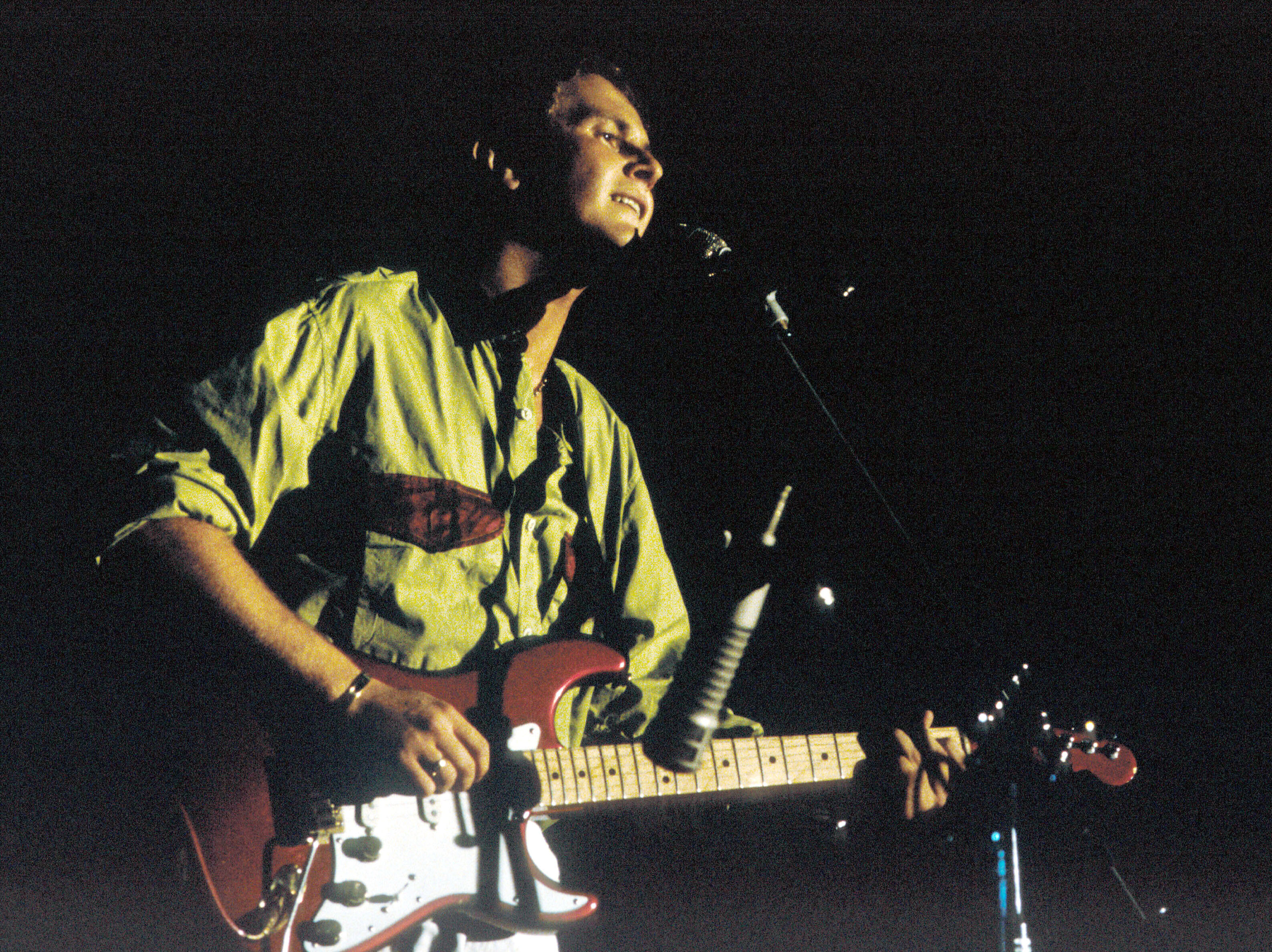
- Ron in concert in the early 1990s
- Born: 13 August 1953 (age 72); Dorno, Pavia, Italy
- Occupation: singer-songwriter

Rosalino Cellamare (born 13 August 1953), better known as Ron, is an Italian singer-songwriter and musician.

Born in Dorno, province of Pavia, he debuted under his true name at the 1970 edition of the Sanremo Festival, together with Nada. In the following years he distinguished as songwriter for Lucio Dalla and others.

After a period as actor, he returned collaborating with Dalla and De Gregori in their Banana Republic tour of 1979, and issuing the LPs Una città per cantare (1980) and Anima (1982). These were followed by Joe Temerario (1984) and Il mondo avrà una grande anima (1988). The song "Una città per cantare" is an Italian cover of "The Road", song Danny O'Keefe, with Italian lyrics are written by Lucio Dalla.

In 1996, he won the Sanremo Music Festival with the song "Vorrei incontrarti fra cent'anni", sung alongside Tosca, and in 2018 he won the Mia Martini critics award with "Almeno pensami", written by Dalla.
