= Luca Barbarossa =

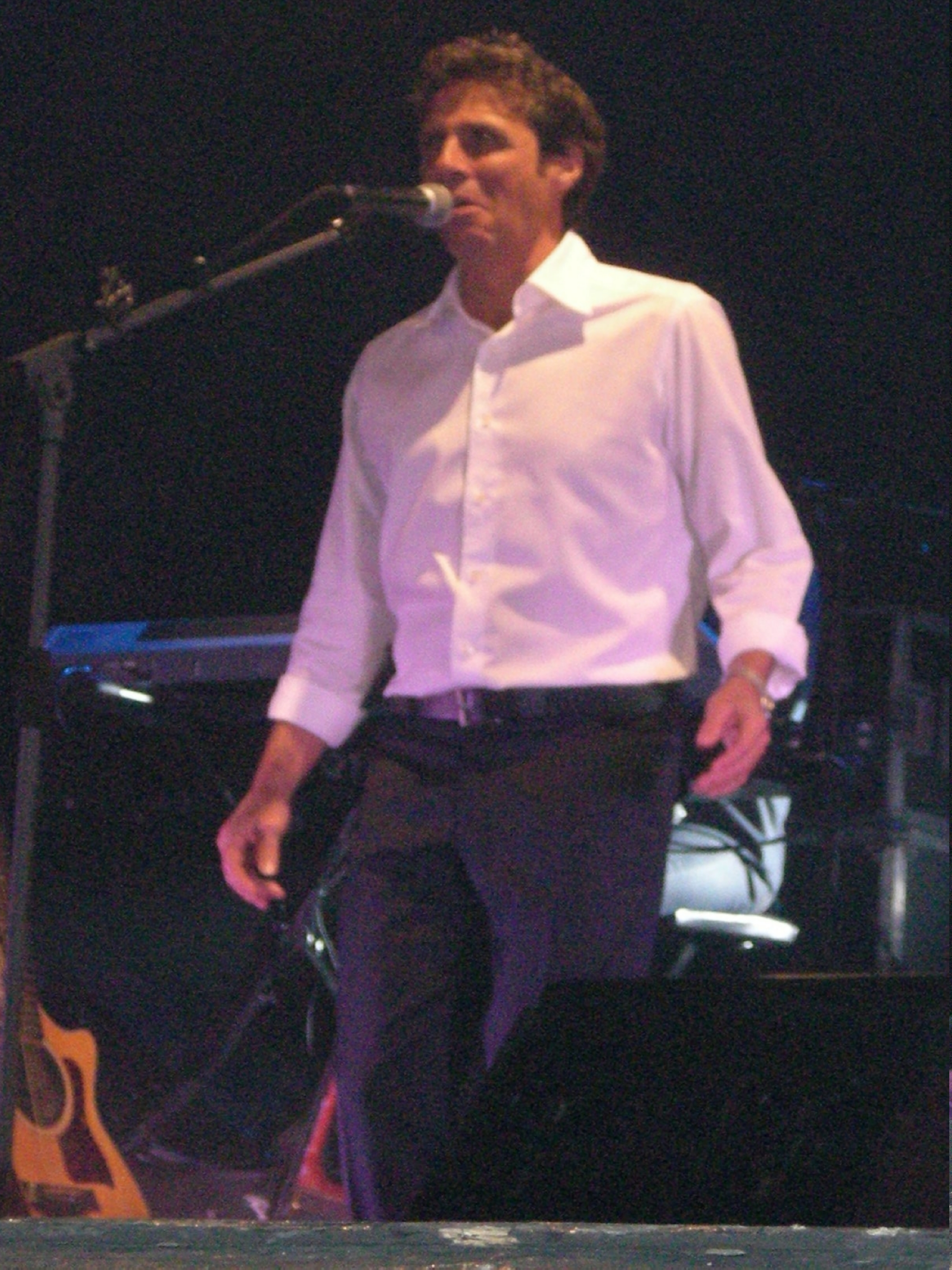
- Luca Barbarossa, 2009 concert in Turin

Background information
- Born: 15 April 1961 (age 65); Rome, Italy
- Origin: Rome, Italy
- Genres: Pop; rock
- Occupations: Singer; songwriter
- Website: Luca Barbarossa

Luca Barbarossa (born 15 April 1961) is an Italian singer-songwriter who has released 12 albums since 1981, and is known for his participation in the 1988 Eurovision Song Contest.

== Early career ==
In 1980, Barbarossa won the Castrocaro Music Festival, where he was spotted by a producer for the Fonit-Cetra record company, who signed him to a recording contract. As the Castrocaro winner, he was eligible to compete in the 1981 San Remo Festival, where he finished fourth with the self-penned song "Roma spogliata". His first self-titled album was released in the same year, and he toured as support act to Riccardo Cocciante. The album, and the singles released from it, were not notably successful and relations soured with Fonit-Cetra, leading to Barbarossa's departure from the label. He signed with the Italian division of the CBS label, where the decision was taken to try to establish him as a singles artist before releasing an album. In 1986, he again participated in the San Remo Festival with "Via Margutta", but only managed 18th place. Another San Remo entry in 1987 resulted in ninth place for "Come dentro un film", which was also the title of the first album he released for CBS in the same year. He achieved his best San Remo placement to date in 1988 with "L'amore rubato" finishing third.

== Eurovision Song Contest ==
In 1988, Barbarossa was chosen by broadcaster RAI as the Italian Eurovision representative with the song "Vivo (Ti scrivo)" ("Alive (I Write to You)"). He went forward to the 33rd Eurovision Song Contest, held on 30 April in Dublin, where "Vivo (Ti scrivo)" finished in 12th place of 21 entries.

== Later career ==
Barbarossa won the 1992 San Remo Festival at his fifth attempt with "Portami a ballare", a song dedicated to his mother. In the 1990s he released four studio albums and a live album. In 1996 another San Remo entry with "Il ragazzo con la chitarra" placed 12th. A compilation album of his most popular songs, with two previously unreleased tracks, was issued in 2001.

Barbarossa's next San Remo participation came in 2003, with "Fortuna" finishing 10th. He released an album of the same name that year, before putting his recording career on hold for four years. He returned with a single, "Aspettavamo il 2000" in 2007, before releasing Via delle storie infinite, his first album for five years, in 2008.

Barbarossa would take part in the festival two more times: in 2011, and 7 years later: the first song was Fino in Fondo, performed as a duet with Spanish singer Raquel del Rosario. The song came in 8th, and after Sanremo ended he published a compilation called Barbarossa Social Club, in collaboration with artists like Max Gazzè and Roy Paci, among others. His 2018 Sanremo song, Passame Er Sale, was performed in the Romanesco dialect of Italian, a dialect of the Italian language spoken around his native Rome. The song would get him another top 10 result, finishing in 7th place, and it won him a Lunezia award.

== San Remo Music Festival entries ==
- 1981: "Roma spogliata" – 4th
- 1986: "Via Margutta" – 18th
- 1987: "Come dentro un film" – 9th
- 1988: "L'amore rubato" – 3rd
- 1992: "Portami a ballare" – 1st
- 1996: "Il ragazzo con la chitarra" – 12th
- 2003: "Fortuna" – 10th
- 2011: "Fino in fondo" Feat. Raquel del Rosario – 8th
- 2018: "Passame er sale" – 7th

== Albums discography ==
- 1981: Luca Barbarossa
- 1987: Come dentro un film
- 1988: Non tutti gli uomini
- 1989: Al di là del muro
- 1992: Cuore d'acciaio
- 1993: Vivo
- 1994: Le cose da salvare
- 1996: Sotto lo stesso cielo
- 1999: Musica e parole
- 2001: Viaggio di ritorno
- 2003: Fortuna
- 2008: Via delle storie infinite
- 2011: Barbarossa Social Club
- 2018: Roma è de tutti

Awards and achievements
Preceded by Riccardo Cocciante with "Se stiamo insieme"	Sanremo Music Festival; Winner; 1992	Succeeded by Enrico Ruggeri with "Mistero"
Preceded by Umberto Tozzi & Raf with Gente di mare	Italy in the Eurovision Song Contest; 1988	Succeeded by Anna Oxa & Fausto Leali with Avrei voluto
