= Sanremo Music Festival =

Italian song contest

Italian Song Festival Festival della canzone italiana
- Teatro Ariston in Sanremo during the second night of the festival in 2026
- Genre: Pop; folk; rock; others
- Dates: February
- Venue: Sanremo Casino (1951–1976); Teatro Ariston (1977–1989, 1991–present); Palafiori (1990)
- Locations: Sanremo, Liguria
- Coordinates: 43°49′3.58″N 7°46′39.17″E
- Country: Italy
- Years active: 1951–present
- Inaugurated: 1951
- Most recent: 2026
- Organiser: Radiotelevisione italiana (RAI)
- Website: sanremo.rai.it
- Sanremo Music Festival 2026

The Sanremo Music Festival (Italian: Festival di Sanremo [ˈfɛstival di sanˈrɛːmo, festiˈval -]), officially the Italian Song Festival (Italian: Festival della canzone italiana), is the most popular Italian song contest and awards ceremony, held annually in the city of Sanremo, Liguria, organized and broadcast by Radiotelevisione italiana (RAI). It is the longest-running annual TV music competition in the world on a national level (making it one of the world's longest-running television programmes) and it is also the basis and inspiration for the annual Eurovision Song Contest and the Viña del Mar International Song Festival.

Unlike other awards in Italy, the Sanremo Music Festival is a competition for new songs, not an award to previous successes (like the Premio regia televisiva for television, the Premio Ubu for stage performances, and the Premio David di Donatello for motion pictures).

The first edition of the Sanremo Music Festival, held between 29 and 31 January 1951, was broadcast by RAI's radio station Rete Rossa, and its only three participants were Nilla Pizzi, Achille Togliani, and Duo Fasano. Starting from 1955, all editions of the festival have been broadcast live by the Italian TV station Rai 1.

From 1951 to 1976, the festival took place in the Sanremo Casino, but starting from 1977, all the following editions were held in the Teatro Ariston, except in 1990, which was held at the Nuovo Mercato dei Fiori.

The songs selected in the competition are in Italian or in any regional language, and the three most voted songs are awarded. Other special awards are also given, including the Critics' Award, created ad hoc by the press in 1982 to reward the quality of Mia Martini's song, and named after the singer in 1996, after her death.

The Sanremo Music Festival has often been used as a method for choosing the Italian entry for the Eurovision Song Contest. However, unlike other competitions elsewhere, like Sweden's Melodifestivalen, this is only a secondary purpose of the festival, and Sanremo winners are often given right of first refusal in regards to their Eurovision participation. It has launched the careers of some of Italy's most successful musical acts, including Toto Cutugno, Gigliola Cinquetti, Laura Pausini, Eros Ramazzotti, Andrea Bocelli, Giorgia, Il Volo, and Måneskin.

Between 1953 and 1971 (except in 1956), in 1990, and 1991, each song was sung twice by two different artists, each one using an individual orchestral arrangement, to illustrate the meaning of the festival as a composers' competition, not a singers' competition. During this era of the festival, it was custom that one version of the song was performed by a native Italian artist while the other version was performed by an international guest artist. This became a way for many international artists to debut their songs on the Italian market, including Louis Armstrong, Ray Charles, Stevie Wonder, Cher, Gloria Gaynor, Dionne Warwick, Jose Feliciano, Roberto Carlos, Paul Anka, Miriam Makeba, Bonnie Tyler, Shirley Bassey, Mungo Jerry, Kiss, Laura Branigan, Alla Pugacheva, and many others.

== History ==
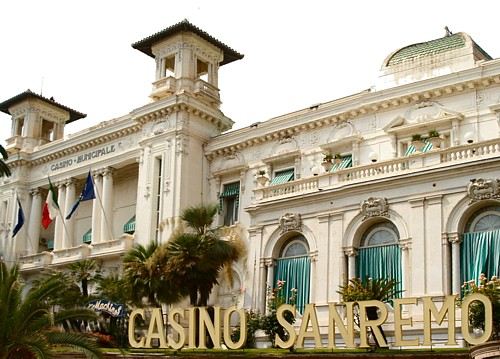
The Sanremo Casino hosted the Sanremo Music Festival between 1951 and 1976.

In the aftermath of World War II, one of the proposals to revitalize the economy and the reputation of Sanremo was to create an annual music festival to be held in the city.

In 1948 and 1949, two editions of an "Italian Song Festival" (Festival della canzone italiana) were held in Viareggio, Tuscany, from an idea developed in 1947 by Aldo Valleroni. The competition was discontinued in 1950 due to financial problems, but it became the basis for the future Sanremo Music Festival.

During the summer of 1950, the administrator of the Sanremo Casino, Piero Bussetti, and the conductor of the RAI orchestra, Giulio Razzi, rediscussed the idea, deciding to launch a competition among previously unreleased songs. Officially titled Festival della canzone italiana, the first edition of the show was held at the Sanremo Casino on 29, 30, and 31 January 1951. The final round of the competition was broadcast by Rete Rossa, the second most important RAI radio station. Twenty songs took part in the competition, performed by three artists only–Nilla Pizzi, Duo Fasano, and Achille Togliani.

Starting from the third edition of the festival, held in 1953, each song was performed by two different artists with different orchestras and arrangements. Two years later, in 1955, the festival made its first appearance on television, since part of the final night was also broadcast by RAI's channel Programma Nazionale. The last night of the show was also broadcast in Belgium, France, Germany, the Netherlands, and Switzerland.

In 1964, Gianni Ravera, who organized the 14th Sanremo Music Festival, slightly changed the rules of the contest, requiring each song to be performed once by an Italian artist and once by an international singer, who was allowed to perform the song in any language. The same rule was applied in the following year's contest. Between 1966 and 1971, entries were not forced to be interpreted by foreign artists, but double performances were kept. Starting from 1972, each entry was sung by one artist only.

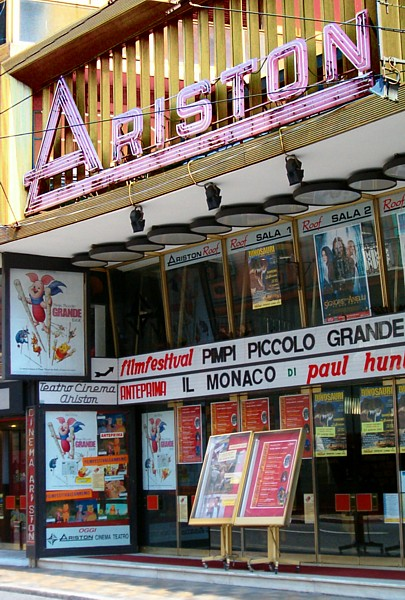
The Teatro Ariston has hosted the Sanremo Music Festival since 1977. The only exception was 1990's contest, hosted at Sanremo's Palafiori.

The competing artists were split for the first time into "Big artists" and "Young artists" during the Sanremo Music Festival 1974. The competition had one winner only, but the entries in the "Young artists" category had to go through an elimination round, while "Big artists" were directly admitted to the final round.

In 1977, the Sanremo Casino, which hosted all the previous editions of the contest, was closed for renovations, therefore the show moved to the Teatro Ariston. The theater later became the usual location for the annual contest, hosting it every year except in 1990, when the show was held at the Nuovo Mercato dei Fiori, also known as Palafiori.

In 1980, pre-recorded backing tracks replaced the orchestra, while playback performances were allowed in 1983 during the final round. In 1984 and 1985, all the artists were forced to perform in playback, while live performances with the orchestra were reintroduced in 1990.

During the same years, several other changes were introduced in the contest. In 1982, accredited music journalists decided to create an award to recognise the best song competing in the festival. Starting from 1983, the prize was officially awarded during the event. The critics' prize was later named after Mia Martini, who was the first artist receiving it in 1982 for her entry "E non finisce mica il cielo".

Moreover, starting from 1984, the separation between newcomers and established artists was marked, introducing two different competitions with separate winners. In 1989, a third category, the Upcoming Artists Section, was introduced, but it was removed the following year. Only in 1998 were the top three artists in the newcomer section allowed to compete in the main competition. This led to the victory of the debuting Annalisa Minetti, which generated some controversy and led to the reintroduction of completely separate competitions starting from 1999.

The distinction among different categories was abolished again in 2004. The following year, the contest included five different categories—Newcomers, Men, Women, Groups, and Classics. The winner of each category competed for the final victory of the contest. The category Classic was abolished in 2006, while starting from 2007, the festival came back to the rules used in the 1990s, with two completely separate competitions for established artists and newcomers.

In 2009, a new competition, held entirely online, was introduced by the artistic director of the 59th edition of the contest, Paolo Bonolis. Titled Sanremofestival.59, the contest was not held in the following years.

In December 2024, the regional administrative court (TAR) of Liguria ruled that the municipality of Sanremo could not directly appoint RAI as the organizer of the event, and that, starting in 2026, a public bid must be held in order to determine the organizing company. Two months later, RAI appealed the ruling, arguing that "[RAI's] branding is inseparable from the [festival's] format"; however, the Council of State later upheld the TAR's decision in May 2025. In early March 2025, the municipality defined the terms of the tenders to be held for the assignment of the 2026–28 festivals, which were published on 9 April, with broadcasters being able to apply within 40 days. Ultimately, the only applicant was RAI, bidding for the exclusive rights on the festival until at least 2028. Despite initial plans by RAI to move the contest to a different Italian location for the 2027 edition onwards, in order to avoid any further legal and financial issues with the municipality of Sanremo, it was later reported that the parties had reached an agreement to keep it in Sanremo until 2029.

== Winners ==
=== Big Artists section ===
Table key
†	Song also represented Italy in the Eurovision Song Contest

==== 1950s ====
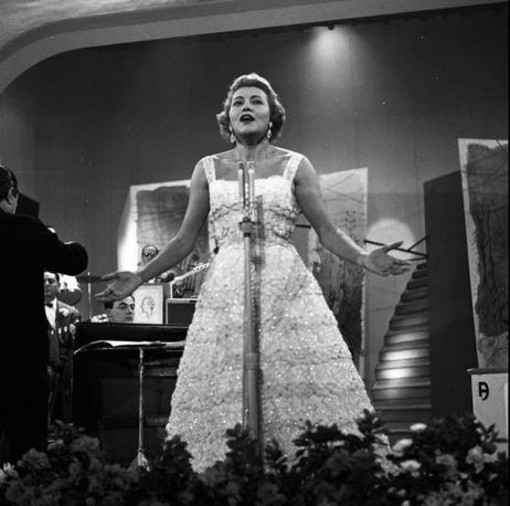
Nilla Pizzi was the winner of the first Sanremo Festival, in 1951.

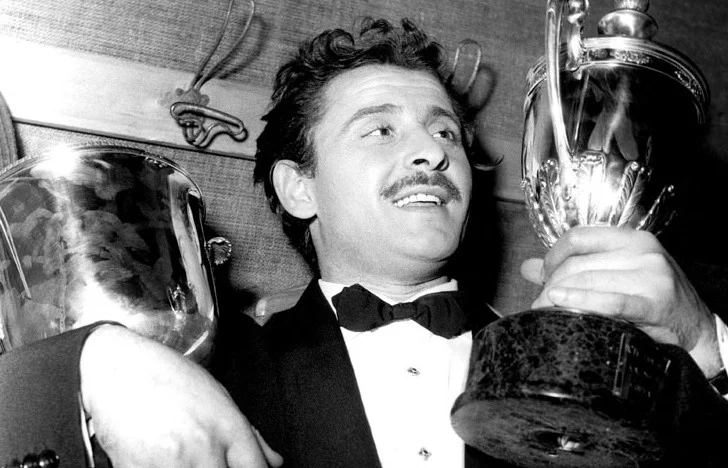
Domenico Modugno after winning the 1959 edition. Modugno won the festival in 1958, 1959, 1962, and 1966.

List of winners of the Big Artists section, with the title of the performed song and its composers
Year	Song	Artist(s)
1951	"Grazie dei fiori" (Saverio Seracini, Gian Carlo Testoni, Mario Panzeri)	Nilla Pizzi
1952	"Vola colomba" (Carlo Concina, Bixio Cherubini)	Nilla Pizzi
1953	"Viale d'autunno" (Giovanni D'Anzi)	Carla Boni & Flo Sandon's
1954	"Tutte le mamme" (Eduardo Falcocchio, Umberto Bertini)	Giorgio Consolini & Gino Latilla
1955	"Buongiorno tristezza" (Mario Ruccione, Giuseppe Fiorelli)	Claudio Villa & Tullio Pane
1956	"Aprite le finestre" † (Virgilio Panzuti, Giuseppe Perotti)	Franca Raimondi
1957	"Corde della mia chitarra" † (Mario Ruccione, Giuseppe Fiorelli)	Claudio Villa & Nunzio Gallo
1958	"Nel blu, dipinto di blu" † (Domenico Modugno, Franco Migliacci)	Domenico Modugno & Johnny Dorelli
1959	"Piove (Ciao, ciao bambina)" † (Domenico Modugno, Dino Verde)	Domenico Modugno & Johnny Dorelli

==== 1960s ====
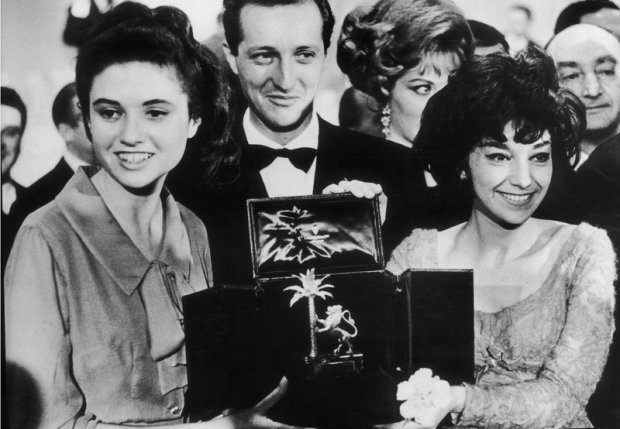
Gigliola Cinquetti and Belgian-Italian Patricia Carli celebrate their victory with the song "Non ho l'età" at the 14th Sanremo Music Festival, 1 February 1964.

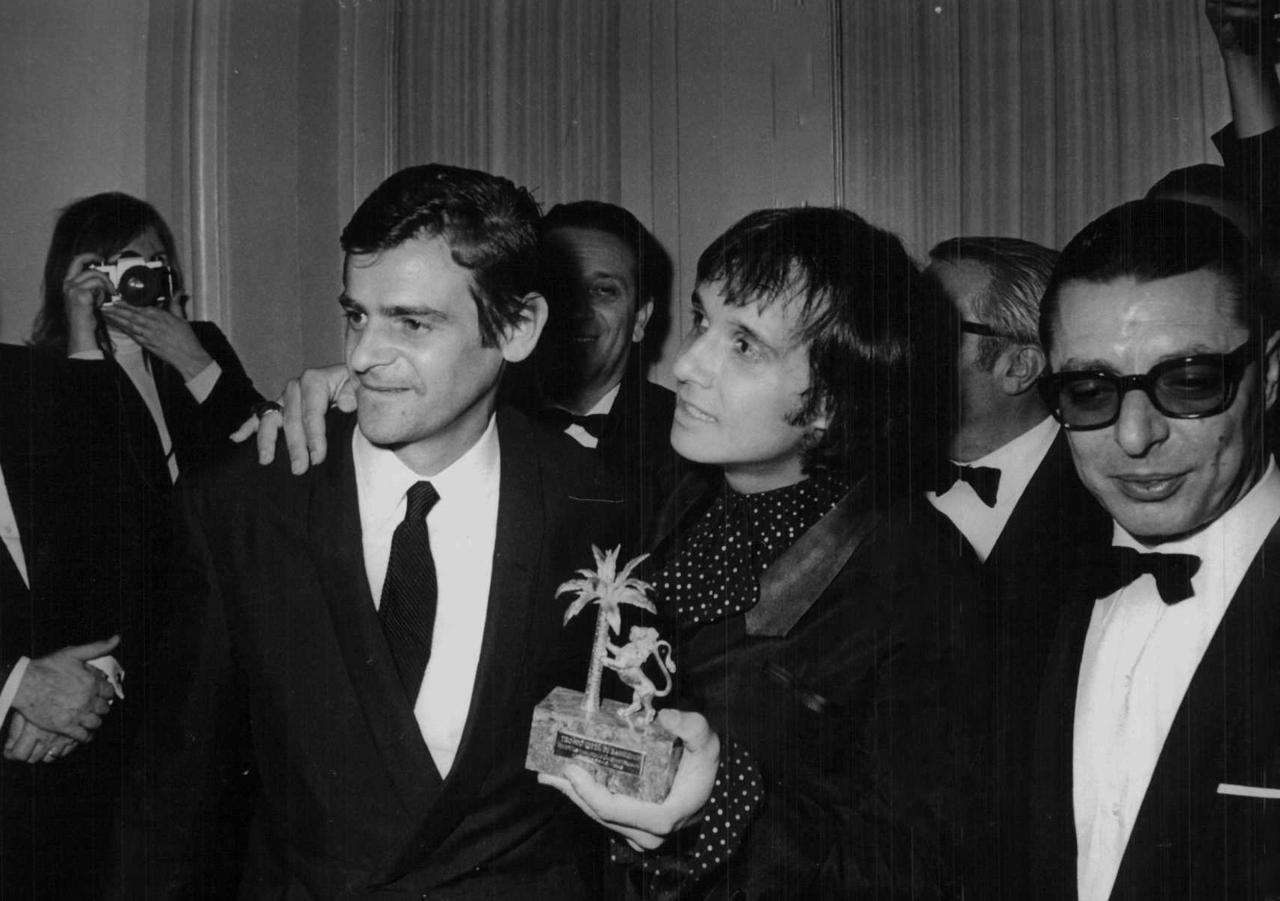
Sergio Endrigo (left) with Brazilian singer Roberto Carlos after their win in 1968

List of winners of the Big Artists section, with the title of the performed song and its composers
Year	Song	Artist(s)
1960	"Romantica" † (Renato Rascel, Dino Verde)	Tony Dallara & Renato Rascel
1961	"Al di là" † (Carlo Donida, Mogol)	Betty Curtis & Luciano Tajoli
1962	"Addio, addio" † (Domenico Modugno, Franco Migliacci)	Domenico Modugno & Claudio Villa
1963	"Uno per tutte" † (Tony Renis, Alberto Testa, Mogol)	Tony Renis & Emilio Pericoli
1964	"Non ho l'età" † (Nicola Salerno, Mario Panzeri, Giancarlo Colonnello)	Gigliola Cinquetti & Patricia Carli
1965	"Se piangi, se ridi" † (Gianny Marchetti, Bobby Solo, Mogol)	Bobby Solo & The New Christy Minstrels
1966	"Dio, come ti amo" † (Domenico Modugno)	Domenico Modugno & Gigliola Cinquetti
1967	"Non pensare a me" (Eros Sciorilli, Alberto Testa)	Claudio Villa & Iva Zanicchi
1968	"Canzone per te" (Sergio Endrigo, Luis Enriquez, Sergio Bardotti)	Sergio Endrigo & Roberto Carlos
1969	"Zingara" (Enrico Riccardi, Luigi Albertelli)	Bobby Solo & Iva Zanicchi

==== 1970s ====
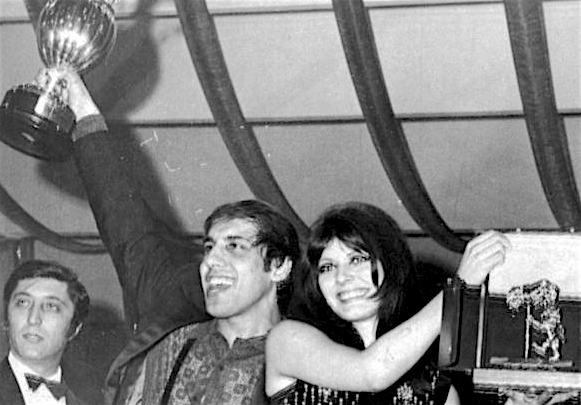
Adriano Celentano and Claudia Mori won the 1970 edition of the festival.

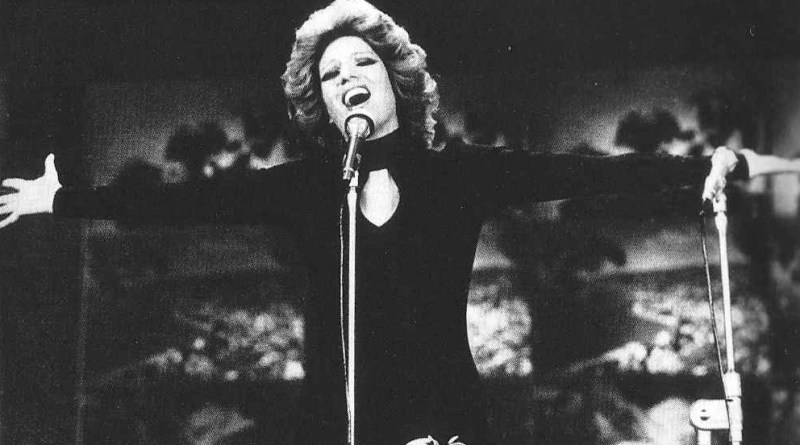
Iva Zanicchi during the 1974 edition of the festival

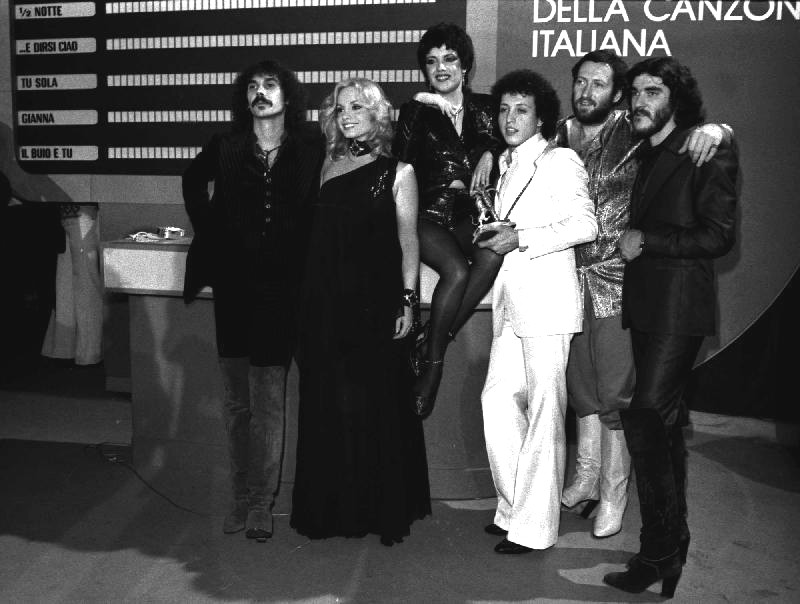
Matia Bazar won the 1978 edition of the festival.

List of winners of the Big Artists section, with the title of the performed song and its composers
Year	Song	Artist(s)
1970	"Chi non lavora non fa l'amore" (Adriano Celentano, Ferdinando De Luca, Luciano Beretta, Miki Del Prete)	Adriano Celentano & Claudia Mori
1971	"Il cuore è uno zingaro" (Claudio Mattone, Franco Migliacci)	Nada & Nicola Di Bari
1972	"I giorni dell'arcobaleno" † (Nicola Di Bari, Piero Pintucci, Dalmazio Masini)	Nicola Di Bari
1973	"Un grande amore e niente più" (Peppino Di Capri, Claudio Mattone, Gianni Wright, Giuseppe Faiella, Franco Califano)	Peppino Di Capri
1974	"Ciao cara, come stai?" (Cristiano Malgioglio, Italo Ianne, Claudio Fontana, Antonio Ansoldi)	Iva Zanicchi
1975	"Ragazza del sud" (Rosangela Scalabrino)	Gilda
1976	"Non lo faccio più" (Salvatore De Pasquale, Fabrizio Berlincioni, Salvatore De Pasquale, Sergio Iodice)	Peppino Di Capri
1977	"Bella da morire" (Renato Pareti, Alberto Salerno)	Homo Sapiens
1978	"...e dirsi ciao" (Piero Cassano, Carlo Marrale, Antonella Ruggiero, Salvatore Stellitta, Giancarlo Golzi)	Matia Bazar
1979	"Amare" (Sergio Ortone, Piero Soffici, Pietro Finà)	Mino Vergnaghi

==== 1980s ====
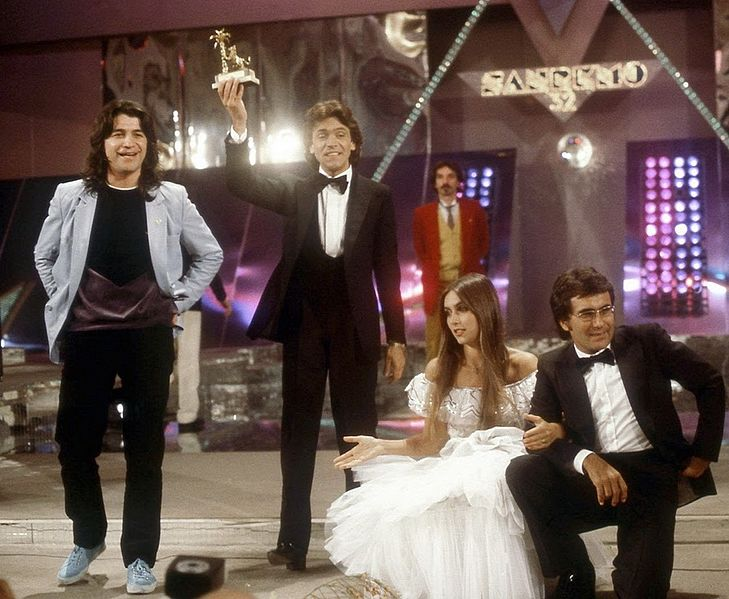
Riccardo Fogli (center), winner of the 1982 edition of the festival, with Drupi (left), Al Bano, and Romina Power (right)

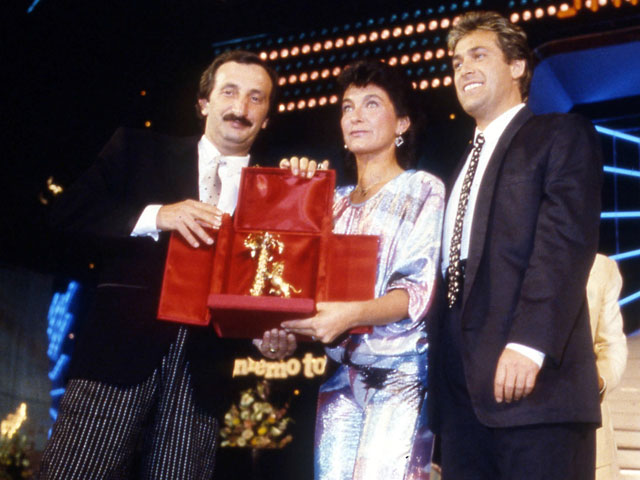
Ricchi e Poveri won the festival in 1985.

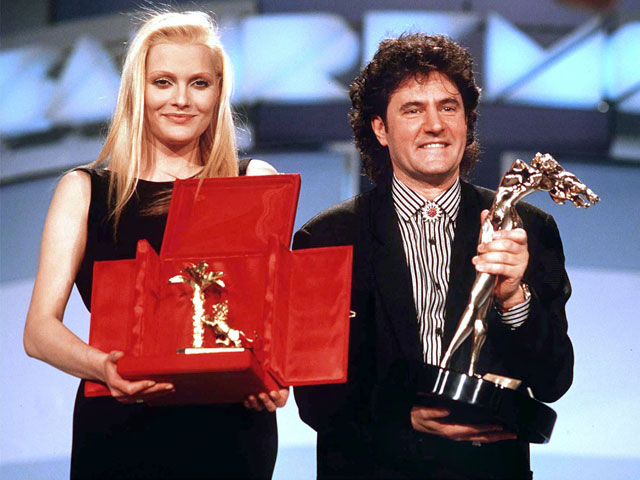
Anna Oxa and Fausto Leali won the festival in 1989.

List of winners of the Big Artists section, with the title of the performed song and its composers
Year	Song	Artist(s)
1980	"Solo noi" (Toto Cutugno)	Toto Cutugno
1981	"Per Elisa" (Franco Battiato, Giusto Pio, Alice Visconti)	Alice
1982	"Storie di tutti i giorni" (Riccardo Fogli, Maurizio Fabrizio, Guido Morra)	Riccardo Fogli
1983	"Sarà quel che sarà" (Maurizio Fabrizio, Roberto Ferri)	Tiziana Rivale
1984	"Ci sarà" (Dario Farina, Cristiano Minellono)	Al Bano and Romina Power
1985	"Se m'innamoro" (Dario Farina, Cristiano Minellono)	Ricchi e Poveri
1986	"Adesso tu" (Eros Ramazzotti, Piero Cassano, Adelio Cogliati)	Eros Ramazzotti
1987	"Si può dare di più" (Umberto Tozzi, Giancarlo Bigazzi, Raffaele Riefoli)	Gianni Morandi, Enrico Ruggeri & Umberto Tozzi
1988	"Perdere l'amore" (Marcello Marrocchi, Giampiero Artegiani)	Massimo Ranieri
1989	"Ti lascerò" (Franco Fasano, Fausto Leali, Franco Ciani, Fabrizio Berlincioni, Sergio Bardotti)	Anna Oxa & Fausto Leali

==== 1990s ====
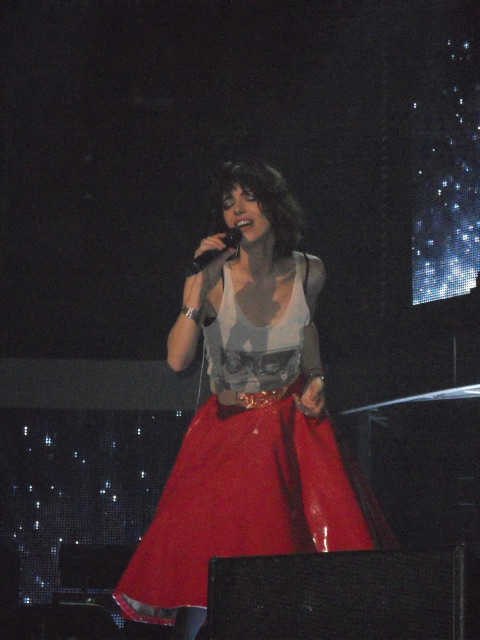
Giorgia won Sanremo in 1995.

List of winners of the Big Artists section, with the title of the performed song and its composers
Year	Song	Artist(s)
1990	"Uomini soli" (Valerio Negrini, Roby Facchinetti)	Pooh & Dee Dee Bridgewater
1991	"Se stiamo insieme" (Riccardo Cocciante, Mogol)	Riccardo Cocciante
1992	"Portami a ballare" (Luca Barbarossa)	Luca Barbarossa
1993	"Mistero" (Enrico Ruggeri)	Enrico Ruggeri
1994	"Passerà" (Aleandro Baldi)	Aleandro Baldi
1995	"Come saprei" (Eros Ramazzotti, Vladimiro Tosetto, Adelio Cogliati, Giorgia Todrani)	Giorgia
1996	"Vorrei incontrarti fra cent'anni" (Rosalino Cellamare)	Ron with Tosca
1997	"Fiumi di parole" † (Fabio Ricci, Alessandra Drusian, Carmela Di Domenico)	Jalisse
1998	"Senza te o con te" (Massimo Luca, Paola Palma)	Annalisa Minetti
1999	"Senza pietà" (Alberto Salerno, Claudio Guidetti)	Anna Oxa

==== 2000s ====
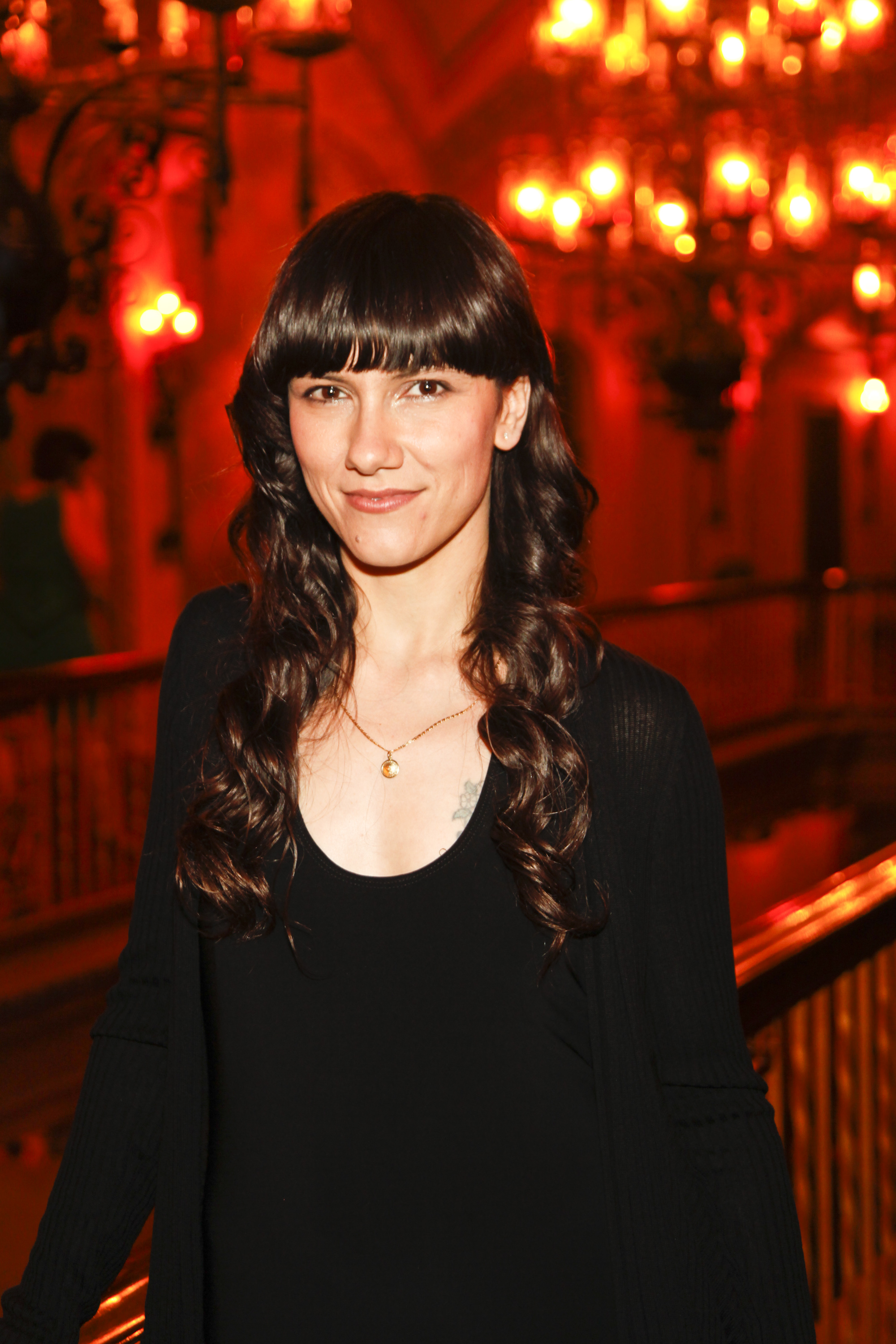
Elisa was the winner of the Sanremo Festival in 2001, with the song "Luce (Tramonti a nord est)".

List of winners of the Big Artists section, with the title of the performed song and its composers
Year	Song	Artist(s)
2000	"Sentimento" (Fausto Mesolella, Giuseppe D'Argenzio, Ferruccio Spinetti, Domenico Ciaramella, Giuseppe Servillo)	Piccola Orchestra Avion Travel
2001	"Luce (Tramonti a nord est)" (Elisa Toffoli, Adelmo Fornaciari)	Elisa
2002	"Messaggio d'amore" (Giancarlo Golzi, Piero Cassano)	Matia Bazar
2003	"Per dire di no" (Alberto Salerno, Alessia Aquilani)	Alexia
2004	"L'uomo volante" (Marco Masini)	Marco Masini
2005	"Angelo" (Francesco Renga, Maurizio Zapatini)	Francesco Renga
2006	"Vorrei avere il becco" (Giuseppe Povia)	Povia
2007	"Ti regalerò una rosa" (Simone Cristicchi)	Simone Cristicchi
2008	"Colpo di fulmine" (Gianna Nannini)	Giò Di Tonno & Lola Ponce
2009	"La forza mia" (Paolo Carta)	Marco Carta

==== 2010s ====
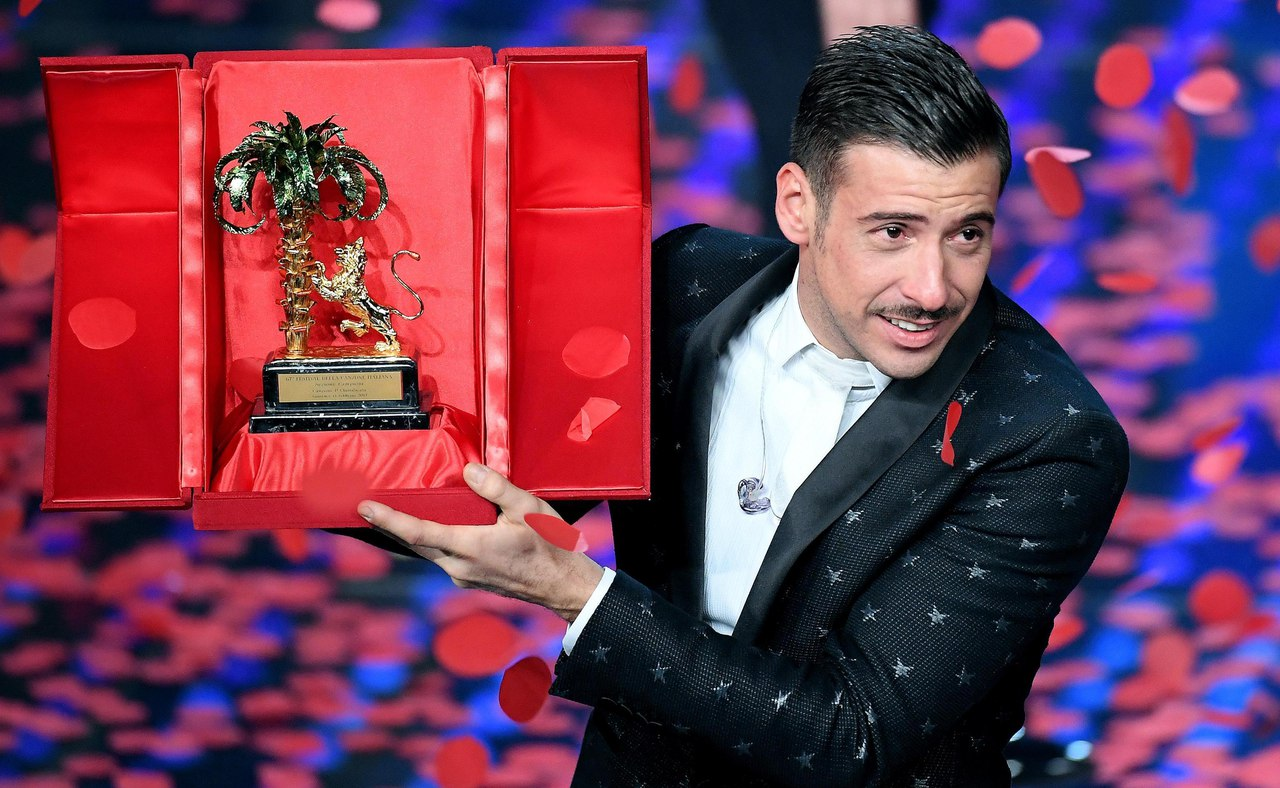
Francesco Gabbani won the 2017 edition of the festival, earning the right to represent Italy in that year's Eurovision Song Contest.

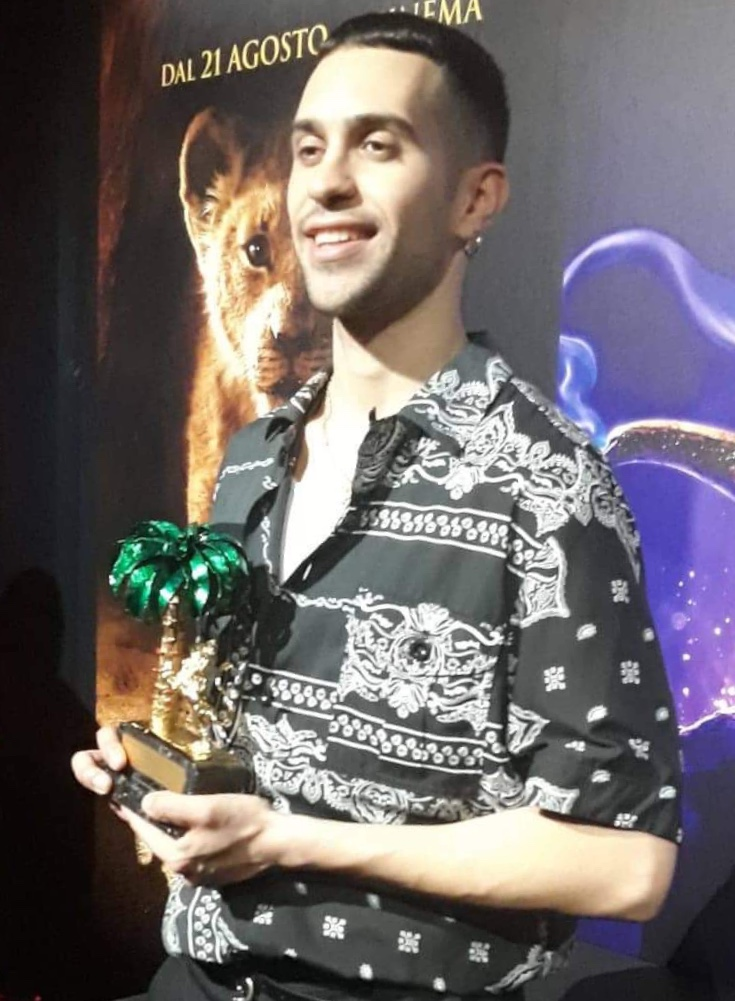
Mahmood won the 2019 edition of the festival, earning the right to represent Italy in that year's Eurovision Song Contest.

List of winners of the Big Artists section, with the title of the performed song and its composers
Year	Song	Artist(s)
2010	"Per tutte le volte che..." (Pierdavide Carone)	Valerio Scanu
2011	"Chiamami ancora amore" (Roberto Vecchioni, Claudio Guidetti)	Roberto Vecchioni
2012	"Non è l'inferno" (Francesco Silvestre, Enrico Palmosi, Luca Sala)	Emma
2013	"L'essenziale" † (Marco Mengoni, Roberto Casalino, Francesco De Benedittis)	Marco Mengoni
2014	"Controvento" (Giuseppe Anastasi)	Arisa
2015	"Grande amore" † (Francesco Boccia, Ciro Esposito)	Il Volo
2016	"Un giorno mi dirai" (Saverio Grandi, Gaetano Curreri, Luca Chiaravalli)	Stadio
2017	"Occidentali's Karma" † (Francesco Gabbani, Filippo Gabbani, Fabio Ilacqua, Luca Chiaravalli)	Francesco Gabbani
2018	"Non mi avete fatto niente" † (Ermal Meta, Fabrizio Moro, Andrea Febo)	Ermal Meta & Fabrizio Moro
2019	"Soldi" † (Mahmood, Dardust, Charlie Charles)	Mahmood

==== 2020s ====
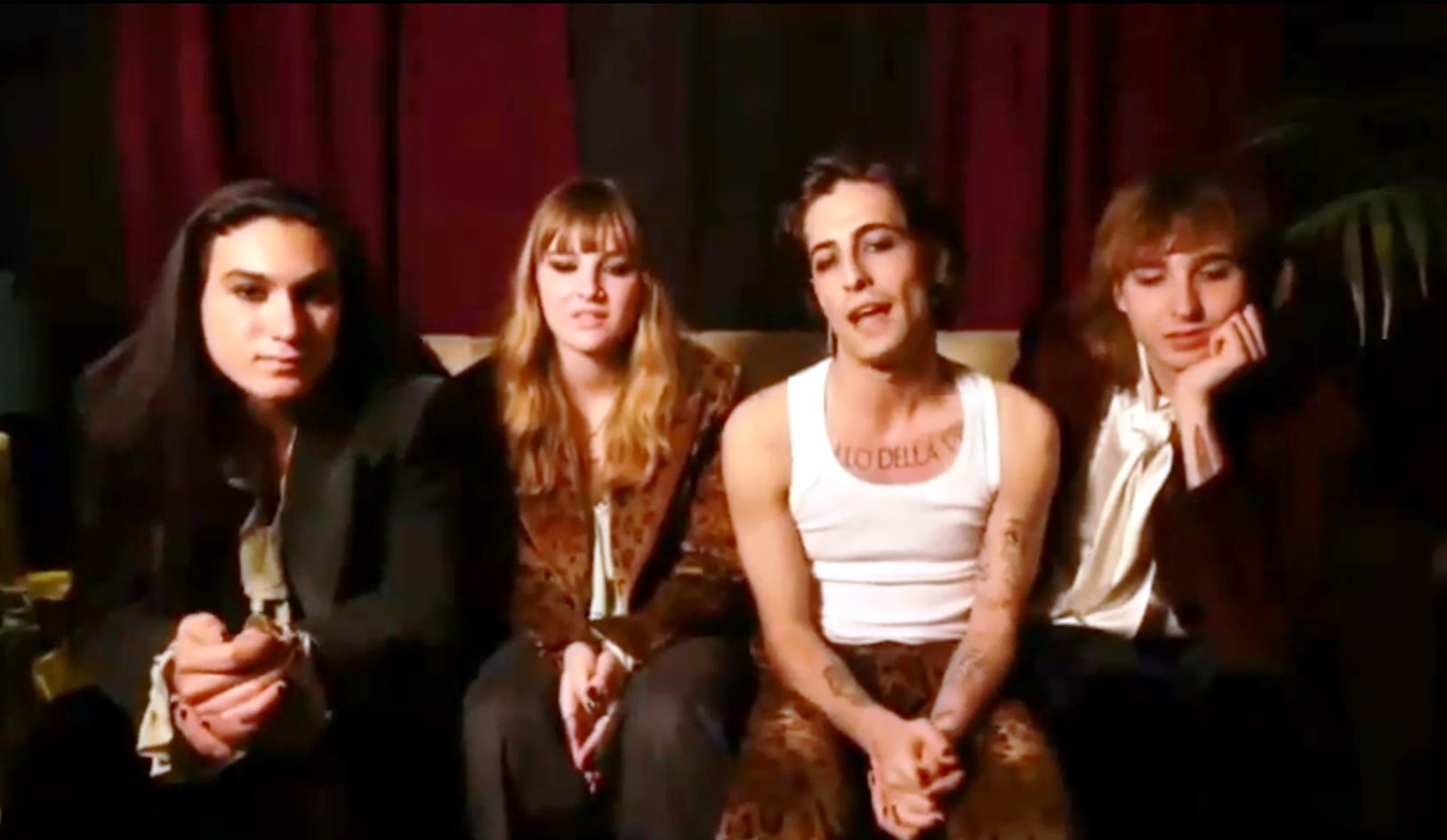
Måneskin won the 2021 edition of the festival and went on to also win that year's Eurovision Song Contest, representing Italy.

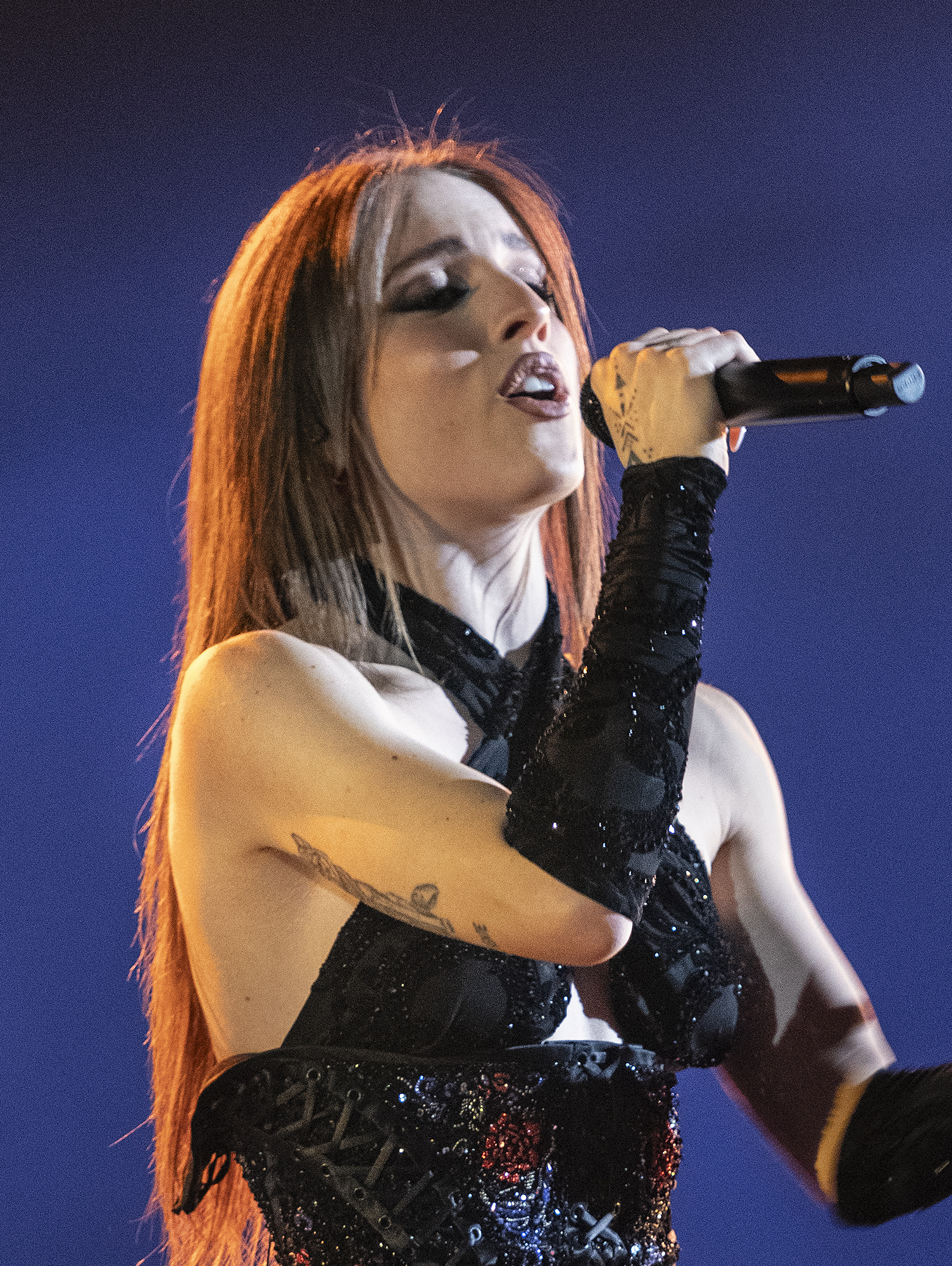
Angelina Mango won the festival in 2024, the only solo woman in the latest ten editions, and earned the right to represent Italy in that year's Eurovision Song Contest.

List of winners of the Big Artists section, with the title of the performed song and its composers
Year	Song	Artist(s)
2020	"Fai rumore" (Note: "Fai rumore" was selected as Italy's entry in the 2020 Eurovision Song Contest but did not compete due to the cancellation of the contest.) (Diodato, Edwyn Roberts)	Diodato
2021	"Zitti e buoni" † (Damiano David, Ethan Torchio, Thomas Raggi, Victoria De Angelis)	Måneskin
2022	"Brividi" † (Alessandro Mahmoud, Riccardo Fabbriconi, Michele Zocca)	Mahmood & Blanco
2023	"Due vite" † (Davide Petrella, Davide Simonetta, Marco Mengoni)	Marco Mengoni
2024	"La noia" † (Angelina Mango, Dario Faini, Francesca Calearo)	Angelina Mango
2025	"Balorda nostalgia" (Federico Olivieri, Julien Boverod, Pierfrancesco Pasini)	Olly
2026	"Per sempre sì" † (Salvatore Michael Sorrentino, Francesco Sorrentino, Alessandro La Cava, Federica Abbate, Federico Mercuri, Giordano Cremona, Eugenio Maimone)	Sal Da Vinci

=== Newcomers section ===
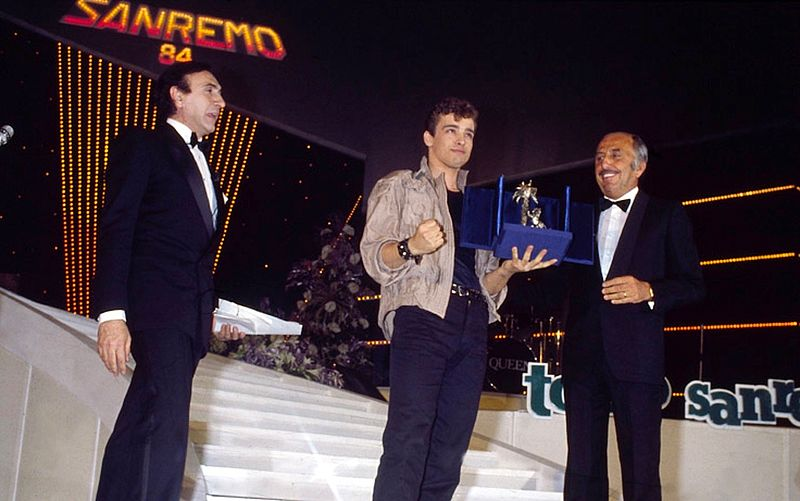
Eros Ramazzotti was the first winner of the Newcomers section in 1984. He then won the Festival in 1986 competing in the Big Artists section.

Table key
†	Song also represented Italy in the Eurovision Song Contest

==== 1980s ====
List of winners of the Newcomers section, with the title of the performed song and its composers
Year	Song	Artist(s)
1984	"Terra promessa" (Eros Ramazzotti, Alberto Salerno, Renato Brioschi)	Eros Ramazzotti
1985	"Niente di più" (Pietro Magnini, Cavaros)	Cinzia Corrado
1986	"Grande grande amore" (Stefano D'Orazio, Maurizio Fabrizio)	Lena Biolcati
1987	"La notte dei pensieri" (Luigi Albertelli, Luigi Lopez, Michele Zarrillo)	Michele Zarrillo
1988	"Canta con noi" (Marco Battistini, Franco Sacco, Mino Reitano, Riccardo Bolognesi)	Future
1989	"Canzoni" (Amedeo Minghi)	Mietta

==== 1990s ====
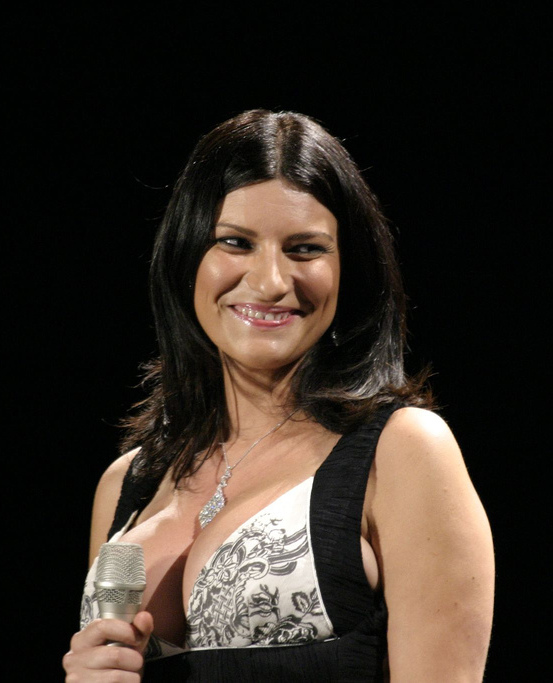
Laura Pausini started her career in 1993, when she won the Newcomers section of the Sanremo Music Festival with "La solitudine".

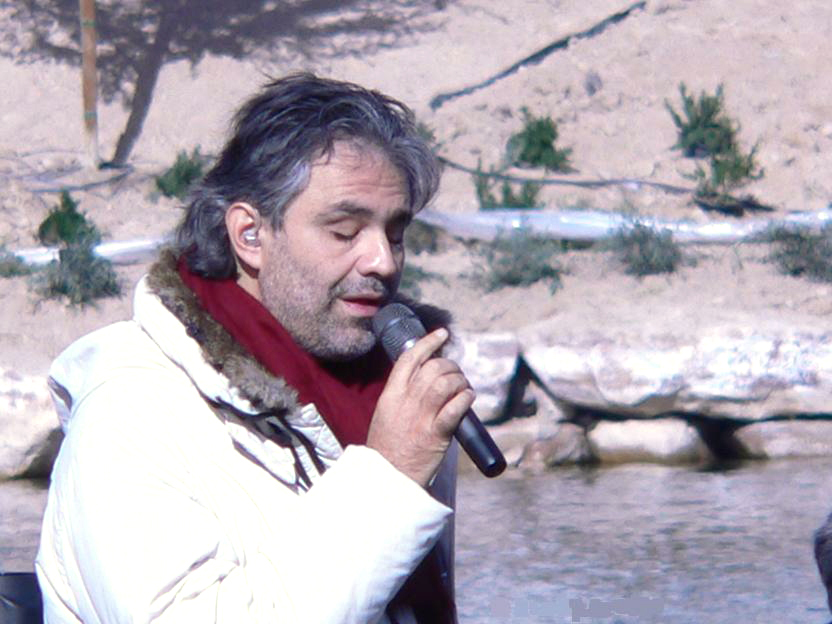
Andrea Bocelli won the Newcomers section of the Sanremo Music Festival in 1994 with "Il mare calmo della sera".

List of winners of the Newcomers section, with the title of the performed song and its composers
Year	Song	Artist(s)
1990	"Disperato" (Marco Masini, Giancarlo Bigazzi, Giuseppe Dati)	Marco Masini
1991	"Le persone inutili" (Giuseppe Dati, Paolo Vallesi)	Paolo Vallesi
1992	"Non amarmi" (Aleandro Baldi, Giancarlo Bigazzi, Marco Falagiani)	Aleandro Baldi & Francesca Alotta
1993	"La solitudine" (Pietro Cremonesi, Angelo Valsiglio, Federico Cavalli)	Laura Pausini
1994	"Il mare calmo della sera" (Gian Pietro Felisatti, Gloria Nuti, Adelmo Fornaciari)	Andrea Bocelli
1995	"Le ragazze" (Claudio Mattone)	Neri per Caso
1996	"Non ci sto" (Claudio Mattone)	Syria
1997	"Amici come prima" (Paola Iezzi, Chiara Iezzi)	Paola e Chiara
1998	"Senza te o con te" (Massimo Luca, Paola Palma)	Annalisa Minetti
1999	"Oggi sono io" (Alex Britti)	Alex Britti

==== 2000s ====
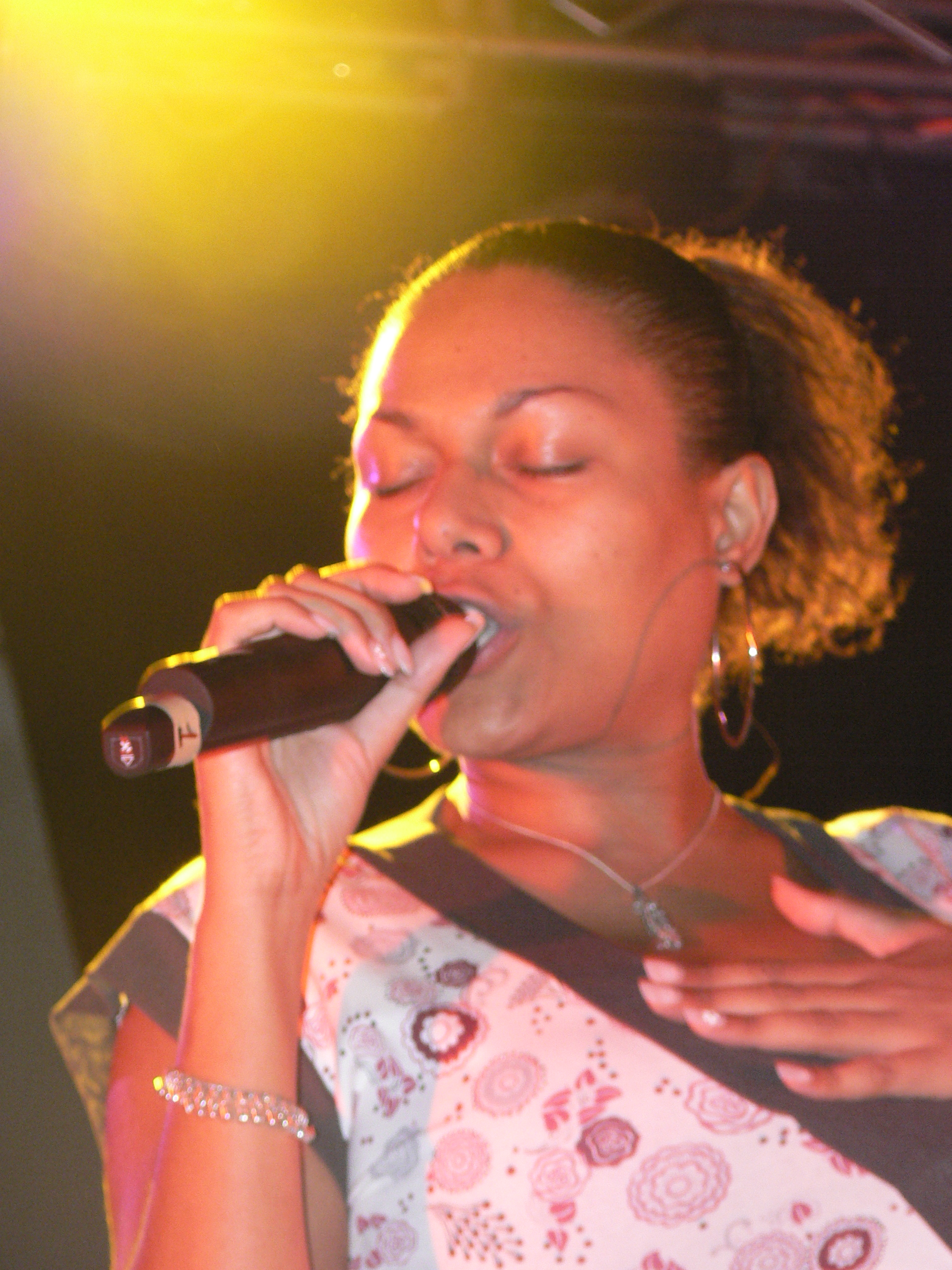
Jenny B won the Sanremo Music Festival in the Newcomers section in 2000.

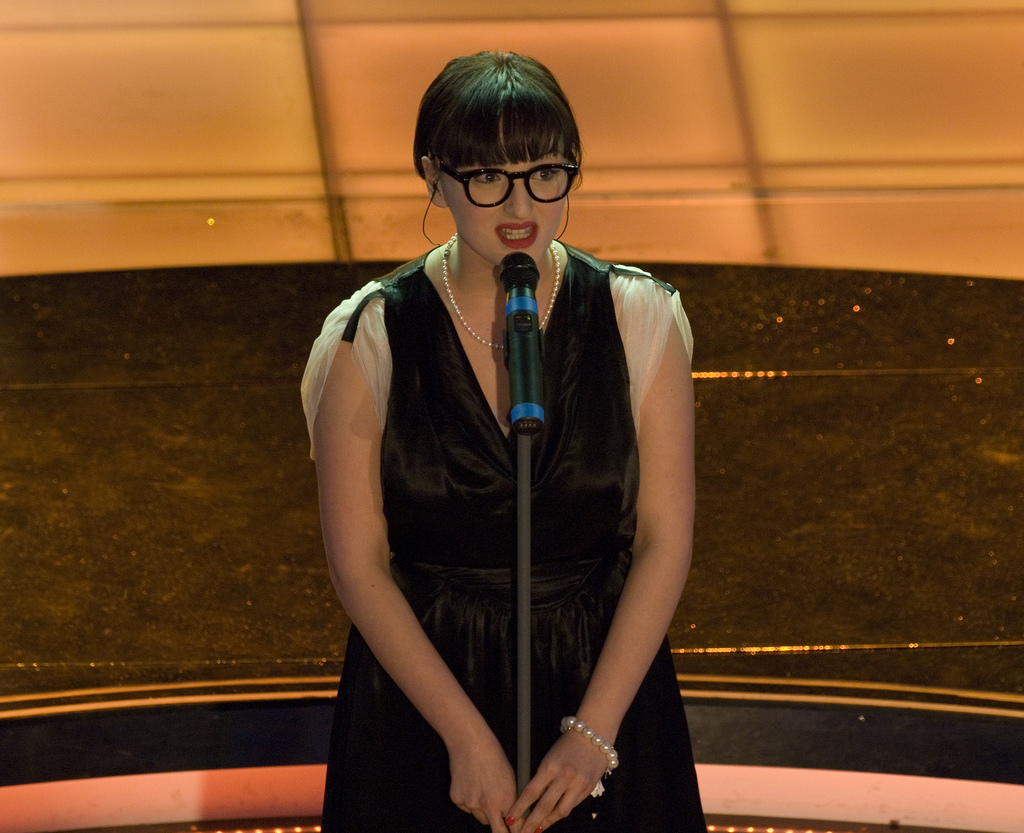
Arisa, winner of the Newcomers section, performing in Sanremo in 2009.

List of winners of the Newcomers section, with the title of the performed song and its composers
Year	Song	Artist(s)
2000	"Semplice sai" (Frank Minoia, Giovanna Bersola)	Jenny B
2001	"Stai con me (Forever)" (Stefano Borzi, Enzo Caterini, Sandro Nasuti)	Gazosa
2002	"Doppiamente fragili" (Marco Del Freo, David Marchetti)	Anna Tatangelo
2003	"Siamo tutti là fuori" (Emanuela Trane)	Dolcenera
2005	"Non credo nei miracoli" (Laura Bonometti, Mario Natale)	Laura Bono
2006	"Sole negli occhi" (Riccardo Maffoni)	Riccardo Maffoni
2007	"Pensa" (Fabrizio Mobrici)	Fabrizio Moro
2008	"L'amore" (Luca Fainello, Roberto Tini, Diego Fainello)	Sonohra
2009	"Sincerità" (Giuseppe Anastasi, Maurizio Filardo, Giuseppe Mangiaracina)	Arisa

==== 2010s ====
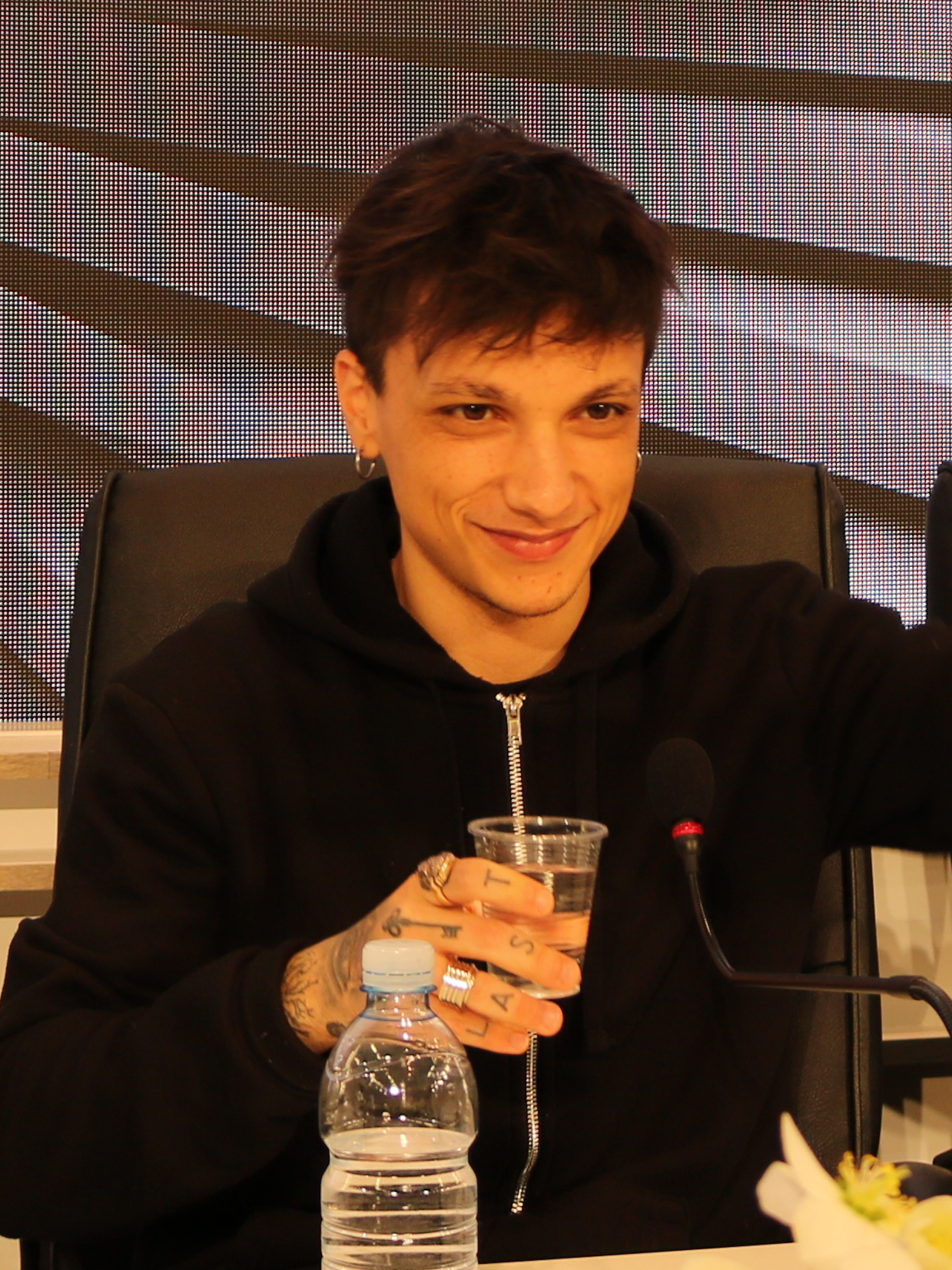
Ultimo at Sanremo in 2018

List of winners of the Newcomers section, with the title of the performed song and its composers
Year	Song	Artist(s)
2010	"Il linguaggio della resa" (Tony Maiello, Fio Zanotti, Fabrizio Ferraguzzo, Roberto Cardelli)	Tony Maiello
2011	"Follia d'amore" † (Raphael Gualazzi)	Raphael Gualazzi
2012	"È vero (che ci sei)" (Matteo Bassi, Emiliano Bassi)	Alessandro Casillo
2013	"Mi servirebbe sapere" (Antonio Maggio)	Antonio Maggio
2014	"Nu juorno buono" (Rocco Pagliarulo, Alessandro Merli, Fabio Clemente)	Rocco Hunt
2015	"Ritornerò da te" (Giovanni Caccamo)	Giovanni Caccamo
2016	"Amen" (Fabio Illacqua, Francesco Gabbani)	Francesco Gabbani
2017	"Ora mai" (Raffaele Esposito, Rory Di Benedetto, Rosario Canale)	Lele
2018	"Il ballo delle incertezze" (Niccolò Moriconi)	Ultimo

==== 2020s ====
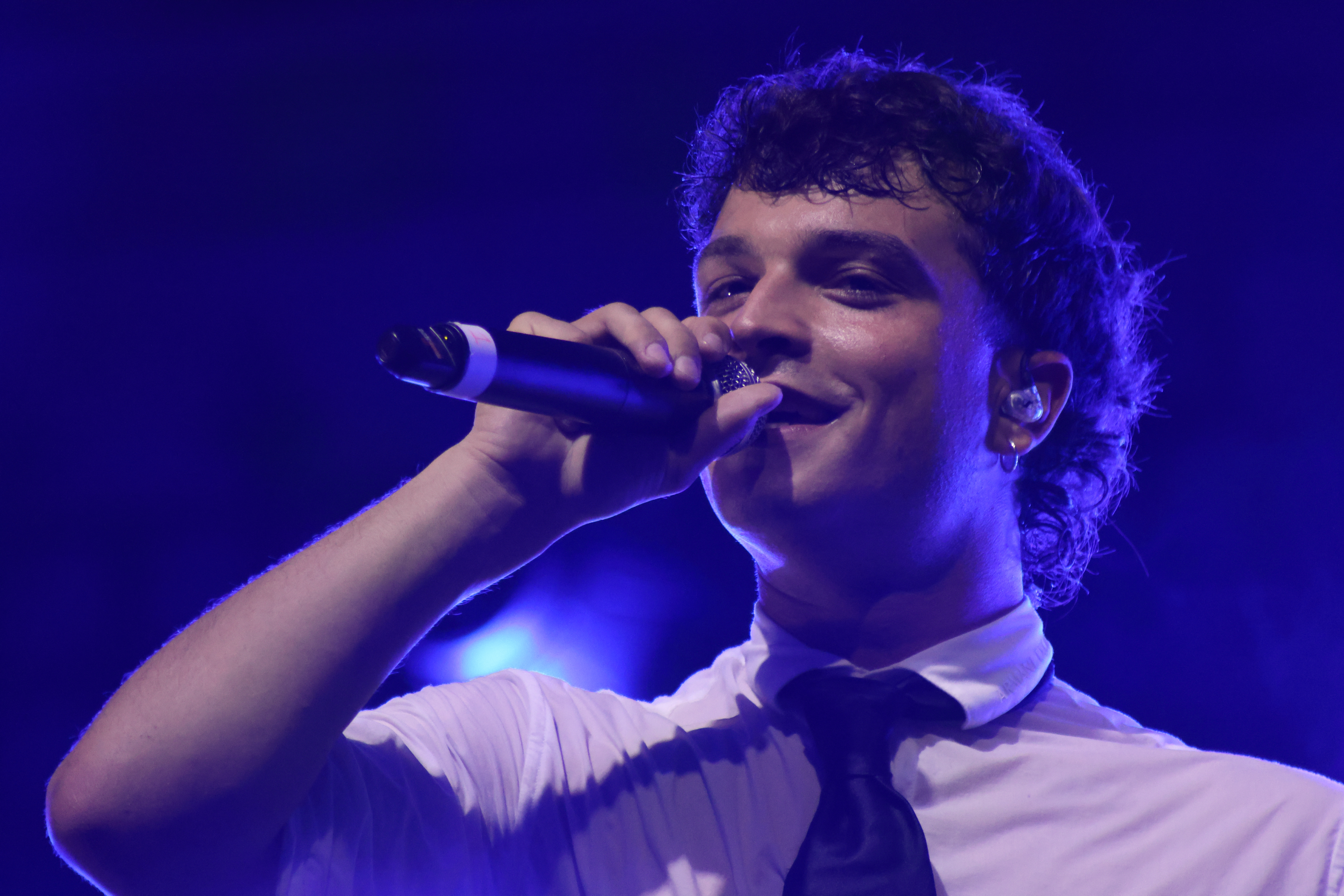
Leo Gassmann in 2023

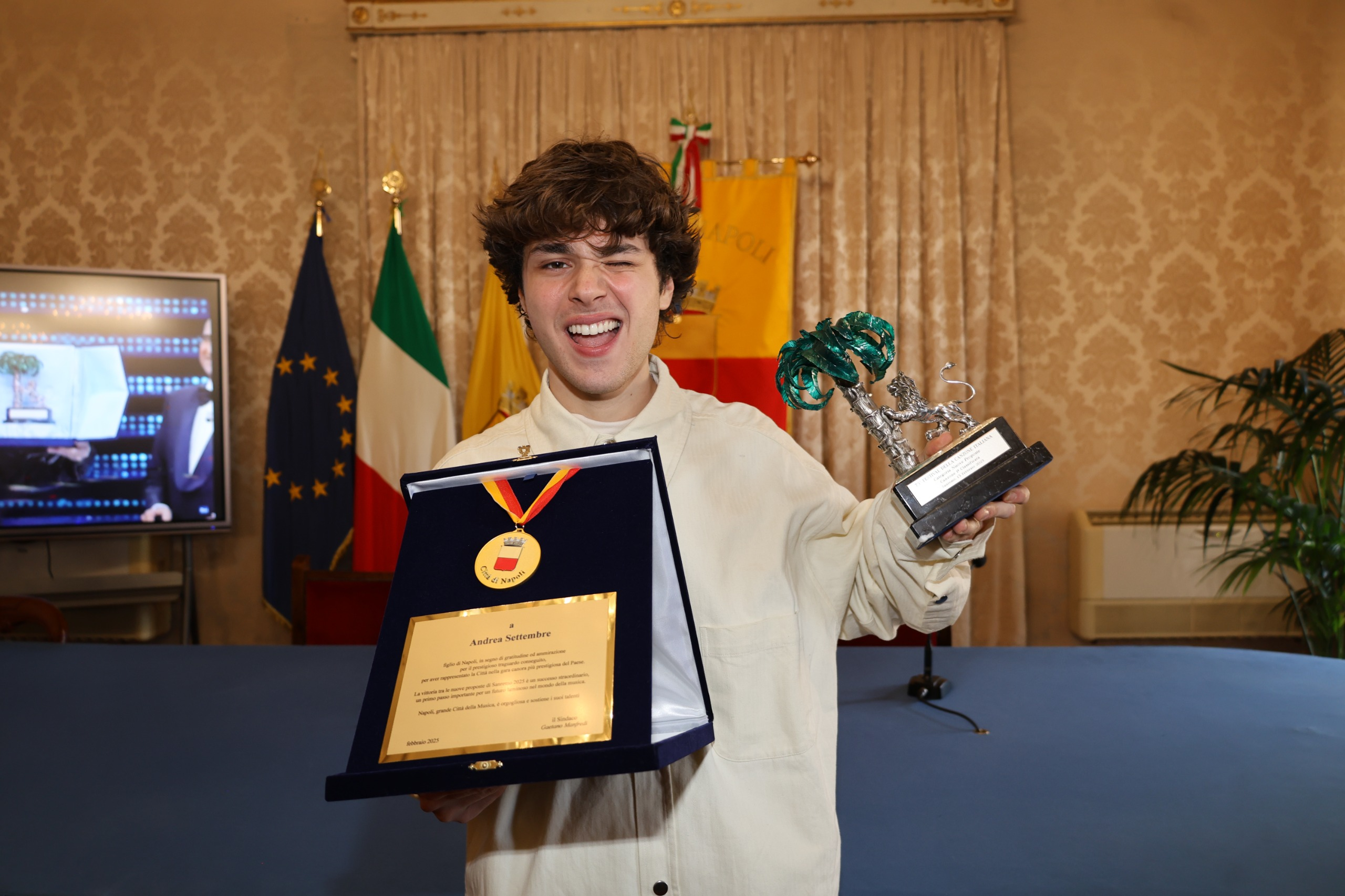
Settembre in 2025, holding his Sanremo trophy

List of winners of the Newcomers section, with the title of the performed song and its composers
Year	Song	Artist(s)
2020	"Vai bene così" (Leo Gassmann, Matteo Costanzo)	Leo Gassmann
2021	"Polvere da sparo" (Luca Gaudiano, Francesco Cataldo)	Gaudiano
2022 (Note: The competition was held in December 2021, without a separate section during the 72nd edition of the annual Sanremo Music Festival, held in 2022.)	"Mille Notti" (Yuri "Yuman" Santos Tavares Carloia, Francesco Cataldo)	Yuman
2023 (Note: The competition was held in December 2022, without a separate section during the 73rd edition of the annual Sanremo Music Festival, held in 2023.)	"La città che odi" (Antonio Filipelli, Bcroma, Gianmaria Volpato)	gIANMARIA
2024 (Note: The competition was held in December 2023, without a separate section during the 74th edition of the annual Sanremo Music Festival, held in 2024.)	"Boulevard" (Clara Soccini, Daniele Magro)	Clara
2025	"Vertebre" (Andrea Settembre, Laura Di Lenola, Manuel Finotti)	Settembre
2026	"Laguna" (Leonardo Lamacchia, Gianmarco Grande, Riccardo Schiara)	Nicolò Filippucci

=== Other sections ===
List of winners of other sections, with the title of the performed song and its composers
Year	Section	Song	Artist(s)
1989	Upcoming Artists	"Bambini" (Roberto Righini, Alfredo Rizzo)	Paola Turci
2009	Sanremofestival.59 (Web contest)	"Buongiorno gente" (Annamaria Lequile, Luca Rustici)	Ania

== "Mia Martini" Critics Award ==
The "Mia Martini" Critics Award, originally named the Critics Award of the Italian Song Festival and, more informally, simply the Critics Award, is a recognition given to the best song, selected by music experts (journalists and music critics) at the Sanremo Music Festival. The prize was created in 1982 specifically to award Mia Martini's interpretation of her song "E non finisce mica il cielo".

Since 1996, the award has been named after Mia Martini, following her sudden death. A petition was launched by the founder of Mia Martini's official club, Chez Mimi, alongside Alba Calia and Dori Ghezzi and supported by numerous Italian artists, including Mina, Luciano Pavarotti, Fabrizio De André, Lucio Dalla, and Franco Battiato. Pippo Baudo, then-artistic director of the Sanremo Festival and the Critics Award jury, decided to name the prize after Martini, specifically because she was the artist who, until then, had won the award the most frequently (three times), as well as having been its first winner.

=== Big Artists section and Newcomers section ===
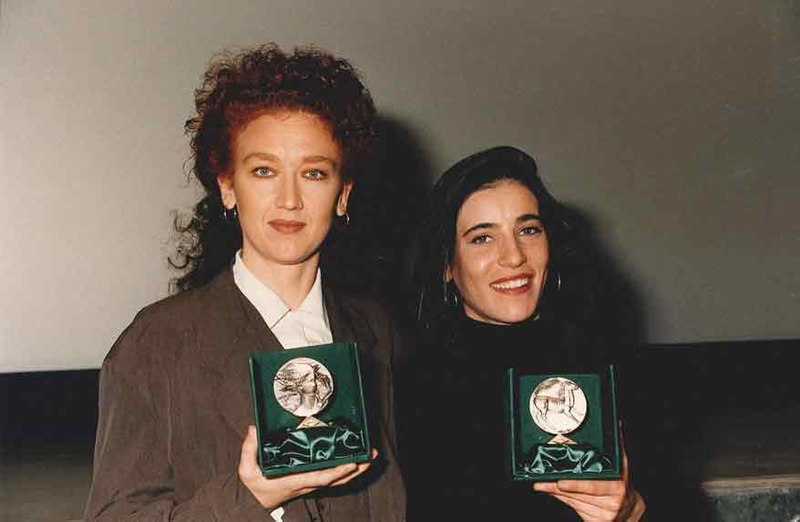
Fiorella Mannoia and Paola Turci in Sanremo, 1988

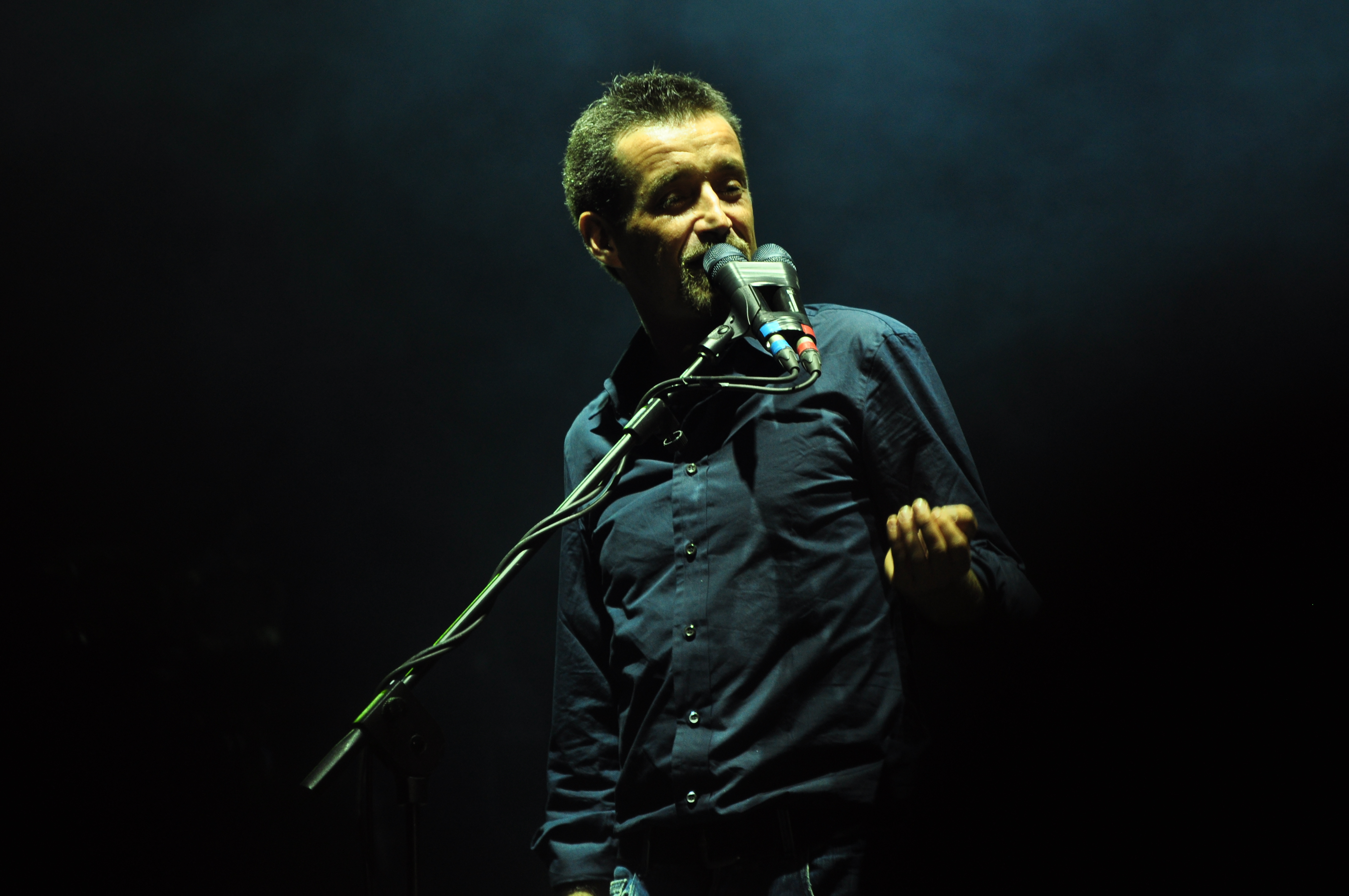
Daniele Silvestri is a three-time winner of the Critics Award. He received it in 1999, 2002, and 2019, with the songs "Aria", "Salirò", and "Argentovivo".

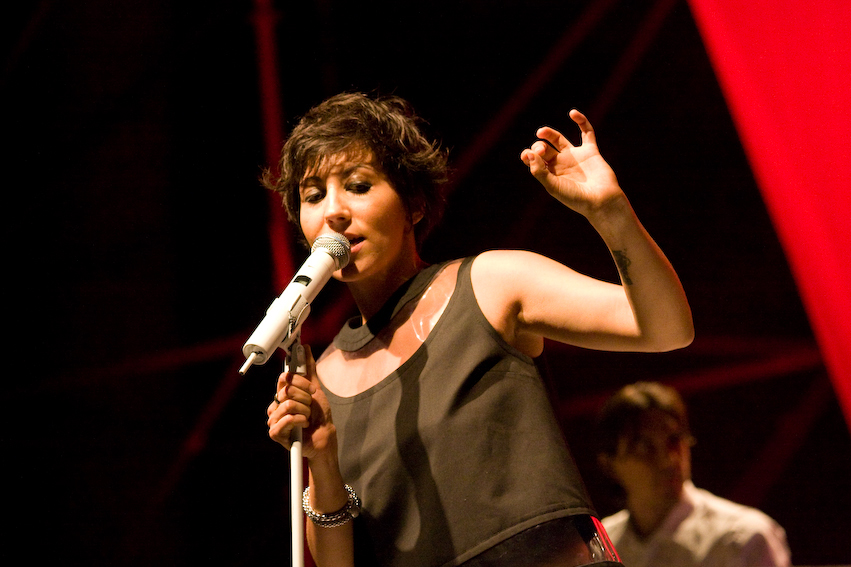
Malika Ayane won the Critics Award in 2010 and in 2015, singing "Ricomincio da qui" and "Adesso e qui (nostalgico presente)", respectively.

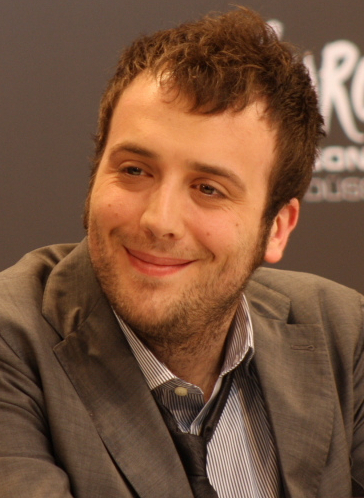
Raphael Gualazzi won the Critics Award in the Newcomers section in 2011, with the song "Follia d'amore".

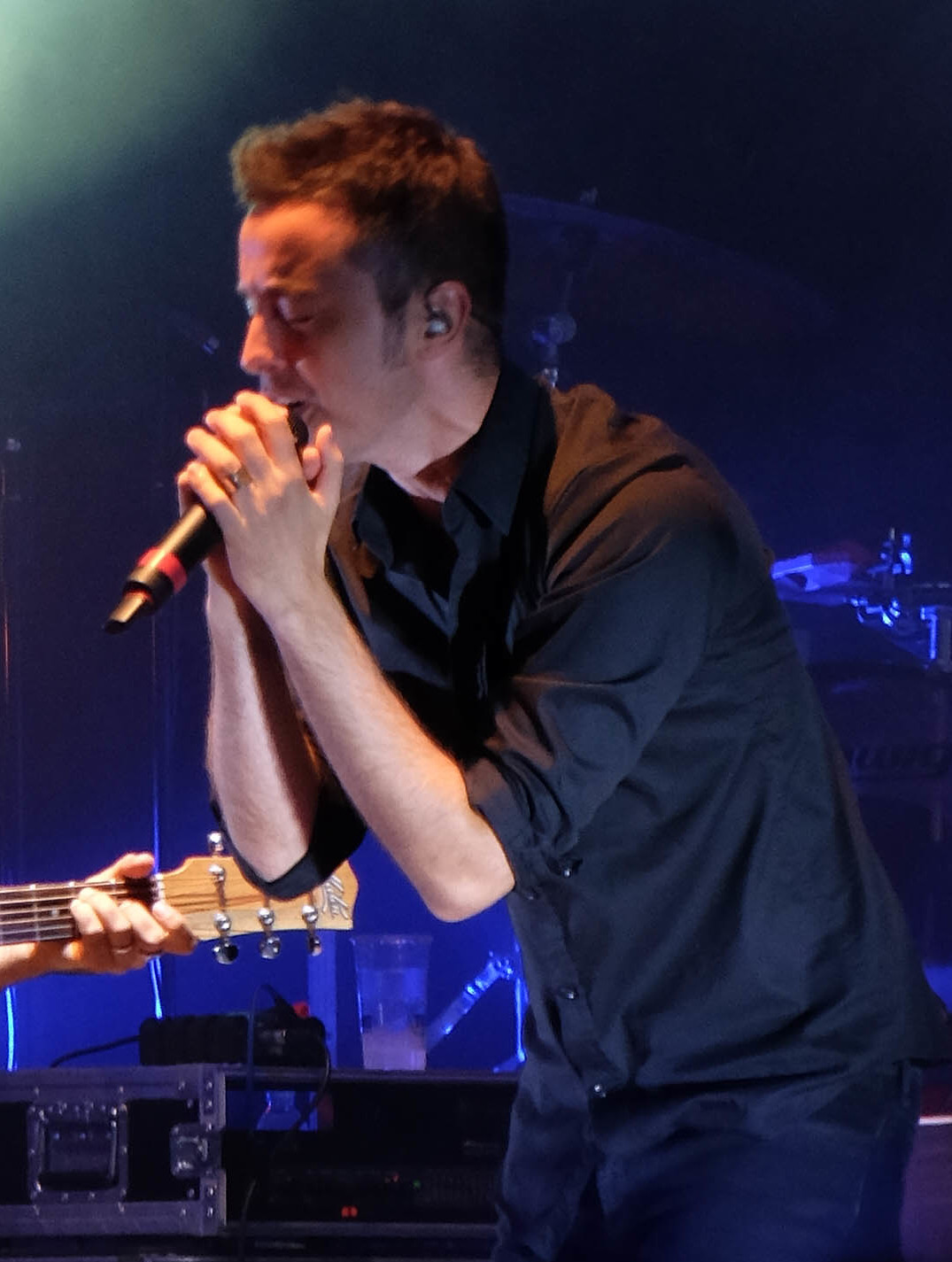
Diodato won both the Critics Award and the Sanremo Festival first place, with the song "Fai rumore".

List of winners, with the title of the performed song and its composers
Year	Big Artists section	Newcomers section
1982	"E non finisce mica il cielo" – Mia Martini (Ivano Fossati)	—N/a
1983	"Vacanze romane" – Matia Bazar (Carlo Marrale, Giancarlo Golzi)	—N/a
1984	"Per una bambola" – Patty Pravo (Maurizio Monti)	"La fenice" – Santandrea (Riccardo Cocciante, Rodolfo Santandrea)
1985	"Souvenir" – Matia Bazar (Aldo Stellita, Carlo Marrale, Sergio Cossu)	"Il viaggio" – Mango (Giuseppe Mango)
1985	"Souvenir" – Matia Bazar (Aldo Stellita, Carlo Marrale, Sergio Cossu)	"Bella più di me" – Cristiano De André (Roberto Ferri, Cristiano De André, Franco Mussida)
1986	"Rien ne va plus" – Enrico Ruggeri (Enrico Ruggeri)	"Grande grande amore" – Lena Biolcati (Stefano D'Orazio, Maurizio Fabrizio)
1987	"Quello che le donne non dicono" – Fiorella Mannoia (Enrico Ruggeri, Luigi Schiavone)	"Primo tango" – Paola Turci (Gaio Chiocchio, Mario Castelnuovo, Roberto Righini)
1988	"Le notti di maggio" – Fiorella Mannoia (Ivano Fossati)	"Sarò bellissima" – Paola Turci (Gaio Chiocchio, Roberto Righini)
1989	"Almeno tu nell'universo" – Mia Martini (Bruno Lauzi, Maurizio Fabrizio)	"Canzoni" – Mietta (Amedeo Minghi)
1990	"La nevicata del '56" – Mia Martini (Carla Vistarini, Franco Califano, Massimo Cantini, Luigi Lopez)	"Disperato" – Marco Masini (Marco Masini, Giancarlo Bigazzi, Giuseppe Dati)
1991	"La fotografia" – Enzo Jannacci & Ute Lemper (Enzo Jannacci)	"L'uomo che ride" – Timoria (Omar Pedrini)
1992	"Pe' dispietto" – Nuova Compagnia di Canto Popolare (Corrado Sfogli, Paolo Raffone, Carlo Faiello)	"Zitti zitti (Il silenzio è d'oro)" – Aereoplanitaliani (Alessio Bertallot, Roberto Vernetti, Francesco Nemola)
1993	"Dietro la porta" – Cristiano De André (Daniele Fossati, Cristiano De André)	"A piedi nudi" – Angela Baraldi (Angela Baraldi, Marco Bertoni, Enrico Serotti)
1994	"Signor tenente" – Giorgio Faletti (Giorgio Faletti)	"I giardini d'Alhambra" – Baraonna (Fulvio Caporale, Vito Caporale)
1995	"Come saprei" – Giorgia (Eros Ramazzotti, Giorgia Todrani, Vladimiro Tosetto, Adelio Cogliati)	"Le voci di dentro" – Gloria (Giovanni Nuti, Celso Valli, Paolo Recalcati)
1996	"La terra dei cachi" – Elio e le Storie Tese (Stefano Belisari, Rocco Tanica, Cesareo, Faso)	"Al di là di questi anni" – Marina Rei (Frank Minoia, Marina Rei)
1997	"E dimmi che non vuoi morire" – Patty Pravo (Vasco Rossi, Gaetano Curreri, Roberto Ferri)	"Capelli" – Niccolò Fabi (Cecilia Dazzi, Niccolò Fabi, Riccardo Sinigallia)
1998	"Dormi e sogna" – Piccola Orchestra Avion Travel (Domenico Ciaramella, Giuseppe D'Argenzio, Fausto Mesolella, Mario Tronco, Ferruccio Spinetti, Francesco Servillo)	"Senza confini" – Eramo & Passavanti (Pino Romanelli, Bungaro)
1999	"Aria" – Daniele Silvestri (Daniele Silvestri)	"Rospo" – Quintorigo (Andrea Costa, Massimo De Leonardis, Valentino Bianchi, Gionata Costa)
2000	"Replay" – Samuele Bersani (Samuele Bersani, Giuseppe D'Onghia)	"Noël" – Lythium (Stefano Piro)
2000	"Replay" – Samuele Bersani (Samuele Bersani, Giuseppe D'Onghia)	"Semplice sai" – Jenny B (Frank Minoia, Giovanna Bersola)
2001	"Luce (Tramonti a nord est)" – Elisa (Elisa Toffoli, Adelmo Fornaciari)	"Raccontami" – Francesco Renga (Francesco Renga, Umberto Iervolino)
2001	"Luce (Tramonti a nord est)" – Elisa (Elisa Toffoli, Adelmo Fornaciari)	"Il signor domani" – Roberto Angelini (Roberto Angelini)
2002	"Salirò" – Daniele Silvestri (Daniele Silvestri)	"La marcia dei santi" – Archinuè (Francesco Sciacca)
2003	"Tutto quello che un uomo" – Sergio Cammariere (Roberto Kunstler, Sergio Cammariere)	"Lividi e fiori" – Patrizia Laquidara (Giuseppe Romanelli, Patrizia Laquidara)
2004	"Crudele" – Mario Venuti (Mario Venuti, Kaballà)	—N/a
2005	"Colpevole" – Nicola Arigliano (Franco Fasano, Gianfranco Grottoli, Andrea Vaschetti)	
2006	"Un discorso in generale" – Noa, Carlo Fava & Solis String Quartet (Carlo Fava, Gianluca Martinelli)	
2007	"Ti regalerò una rosa" – Simone Cristicchi (Simone Cristicchi)	"Pensa" – Fabrizio Moro (Fabrizio Mobrici)
2008	"Vita tranquilla" – Tricarico (Francesco Tricarico)	"Para parà rara" – Frank Head (Francesco Testa, Domenico Cardella)
2009	"Il paese è reale" – Afterhours (Manuel Agnelli, Giorgio Ciccarelli, Rodrigo D'Erasmo, Enrico Gabrielli, Giorgio Prete, Roberto Dell'Era)	"Sincerità" – Arisa (Giuseppe Anastasi, Maurizio Filardo, Giuseppe Mangiaracina)
2010	"Ricomincio da qui" – Malika Ayane (Malika Ayane, Pacifico, Ferdinando Arnò)	"L'uomo che amava le donne" – Nina Zilli (Maria Chiara Fraschetta, Giuseppe Rinaldi)
2011	"Chiamami ancora amore" – Roberto Vecchioni (Roberto Vecchioni, Claudio Guidetti)	"Follia d'amore" – Raphael Gualazzi (Raphael Gualazzi)
2012	"Un pallone" – Samuele Bersani (Samuele Bersani)	"Nella vasca da bagno del tempo" – Erica Mou (Erica Musci)
2013	"La canzone mononota" – Elio e le Storie Tese (Stefano Belisari, Sergio Conforti, Davide Civaschi, Nicola Fasani)	"Il postino (amami uomo)" – Renzo Rubino (Renzo Rubino, Andrea Rodini)
2014	"Invisibili" – Cristiano De André (Fabio Ferraboschi, Cristiano De André)	"Senza di te" – Zibba (Sergio Vallarino, Andrea Balestrieri)
2015	"Adesso e qui (nostalgico presente)" – Malika Ayane (Malika Ayane, Pacifico, Giovanni Caccamo, Alessandra Flora)	"Ritornerò da te" – Giovanni Caccamo (Giovanni Caccamo)
2016	"Cieli immensi" – Patty Pravo (Fortunato Zampaglione)	"Amen" – Francesco Gabbani (Fabio Ilacqua, Francesco Gabbani)
2017	"Vietato Morire" – Ermal Meta (Ermal Meta)	"Canzone per Federica" – Maldestro (Antonio Prestieri)
2018	"Almeno pensami" – Ron (Lucio Dalla)	"Specchi rotti" – Alice Caioli (Alice Caioli, Paolo Muscolino)
2019	"Argentovivo" – Daniele Silvestri (Daniele Silvestri, Tarek Iurcich, Manuel Agnelli, Fabio Rondanini)	—N/a
2020	"Fai rumore" – Diodato (Antonio Diodato, Edwyn Roberts)	"Tsunami" – Eugenio in Via Di Gioia (Eugenio Cesaro, Emanuele Via, Paolo Di Gioia, Lorenzo Federici, Dario "Dardust" Faini)
2021	"Mai dire mai" – Willie Peyote (Guglielmo "Willie Peyote" Bruno, Daniel Bestonzo, Carlo Cavalieri D'Oro, Giuseppe Petrelli)	"Lezioni di volo" – Wrongonyou (Marco "Wrongonyou" Zitelli, Adel Al Kassem, Riccardo Sciré)
2022	"Lettera di là dal mare" – Massimo Ranieri (Fabio Ilacqua)	—N/a
2023	"Splash" – Colapesce Dimartino (Antonio "Dimartino" Di Martino, Lorenzo "Colapesce" Urciullo)	—N/a
2024	"Pazza" – Loredana Bertè (Loredana Bertè, Andrea Bonomo, Andrea Pugliese, Luca Chiaravalli)	—N/a
2025	"Volevo essere un duro" – Lucio Corsi (Lucio Corsi, Tommaso "Ottomano" Sabatini)	"Vertebre" – Settembre (Andrea Settembre, Laura Di Lenola, Manuel Finotti)
2026	"Stupida sfortuna" – Fulminacci (Filippo "Fulminacci" Uttinacci, Pietro "Golden Years" Paroletti)	"Mattone" – Angelica Bove (Angelica Bove, Federico Nardelli, Matteo Alieno)

== Notable foreign duet singers ==
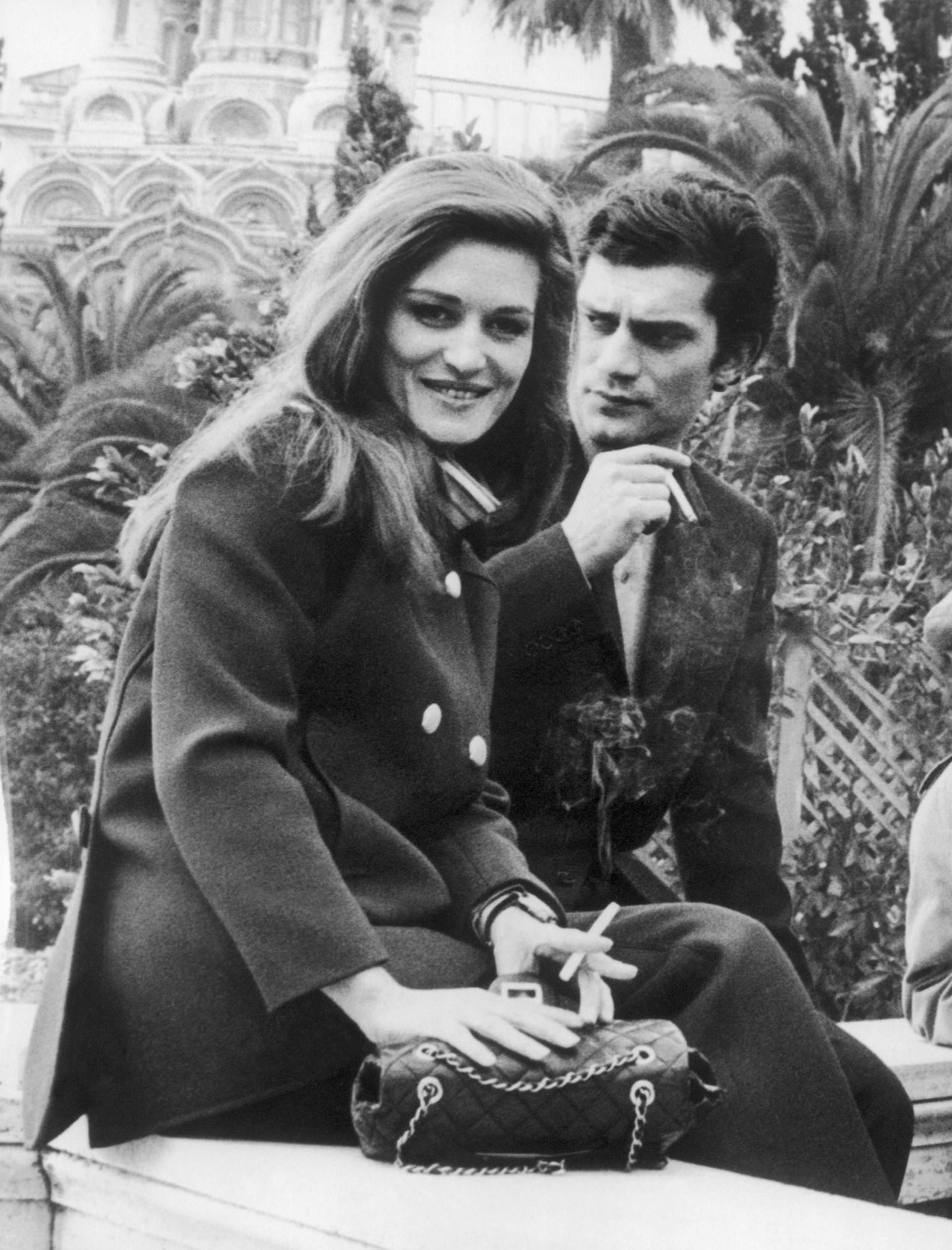
Dalida and Luigi Tenco at the Sanremo Festival, 1967

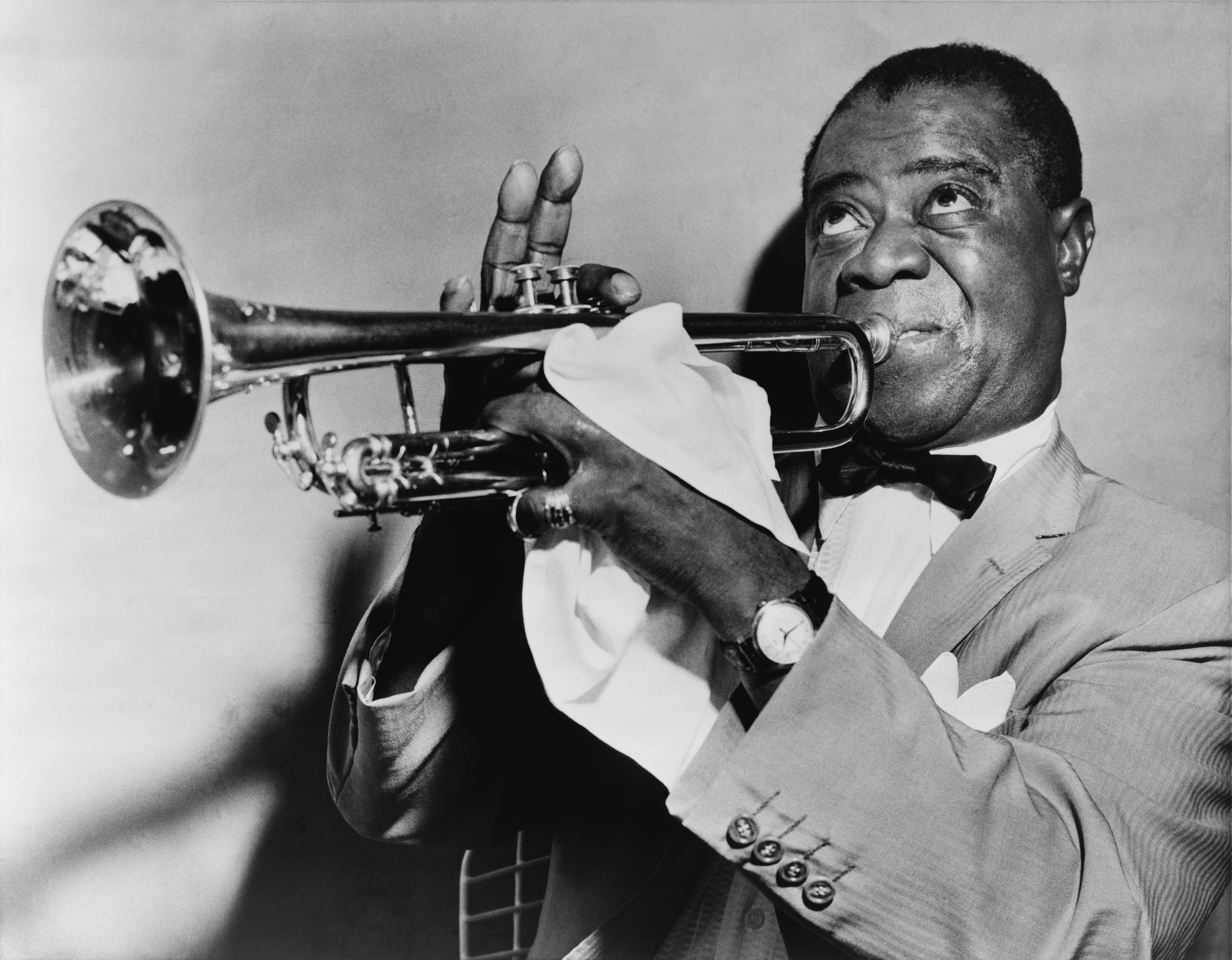
Louis Armstrong participated in the festival in 1968.

Notable guest artists of that time were, among others:

- 1964: Peggy March, team partner of Claudio Villa with "Passo su passo", semi-finals only.
- 1965: Connie Francis, team partner of Gigliola Cinquetti with "Ho bisogno di vederti".
- 1965: Petula Clark, team partner of Betty Curtis with "Invece no".
- 1965: Dusty Springfield, team partner of Gianni Mascolo with "Di fronte all'amore", semi-finals only.
- 1965: Audrey Arno, team partner of Remo Germani with "Prima o poi".
- 1966: Gene Pitney, team partner of Caterina Caselli with "Nessuno mi può giudicare".
- 1966: Pat Boone, team partner of Peppino Gagliardi with "Se tu non fossi qui".
- 1967: Cher and Sonny Bono, team partner of Caterina Caselli with "Il cammino di ogni speranza".
- 1967: Cher, team partner of Nico Fidenco with "Ma piano (per non svegliarmi)"
- 1967: Dalida, team partner of Luigi Tenco with "Ciao amore, ciao", semi-finals only.
- 1968: Roberto Carlos, team partner of Sergio Endrigo with "Canzone per te" (winner).
- 1968: Bobbie Gentry, team partner of Al Bano with "La siepe".
- 1968: Dionne Warwick, team partner of Tony Del Monaco with "La voce del silenzio".
- 1968: Louis Armstrong, team partner of Lara Saint Paul with "Mi va di cantare".
- 1968: Wilson Pickett, team partner of Fausto Leali with "Deborah".
- 1969: Mary Hopkin, team partner of Sergio Endrigo with "Lontano dagli occhi" (second place).
- 1969: Stevie Wonder, team partner of Gabriella Ferri with "Se tu ragazzo mio", semi-finals only.
- 1971: José Feliciano, team partner of Ricchi e Poveri with "Che sarà" (second place).
- 1990: Dee Dee Bridgewater, team partner of Pooh with "Uomini soli" (winner).
- 1990: Ray Charles, team partner of Toto Cutugno with "Gli amori" (second place).
- 1990: Miriam Makeba, team partner of Caterina Caselli with "Bisognerebbe non pensare che a te".
- 1991: Grace Jones, team partner of Renato Zero with "Spalle al muro".
- 1991: Laura Branigan, team partner of Fiordaliso with "Il mare più grande che c'è (I love you man)".
- 1991: Ofra Haza, team partner of Raf with "Oggi un Dio non ho".
- 1991: Gloria Gaynor, team partner of Gianni Bella with "La fila degli oleandri".
- 1991: Bonnie Tyler, team partner of Amedeo Minghi with "Nené".

== International successes ==
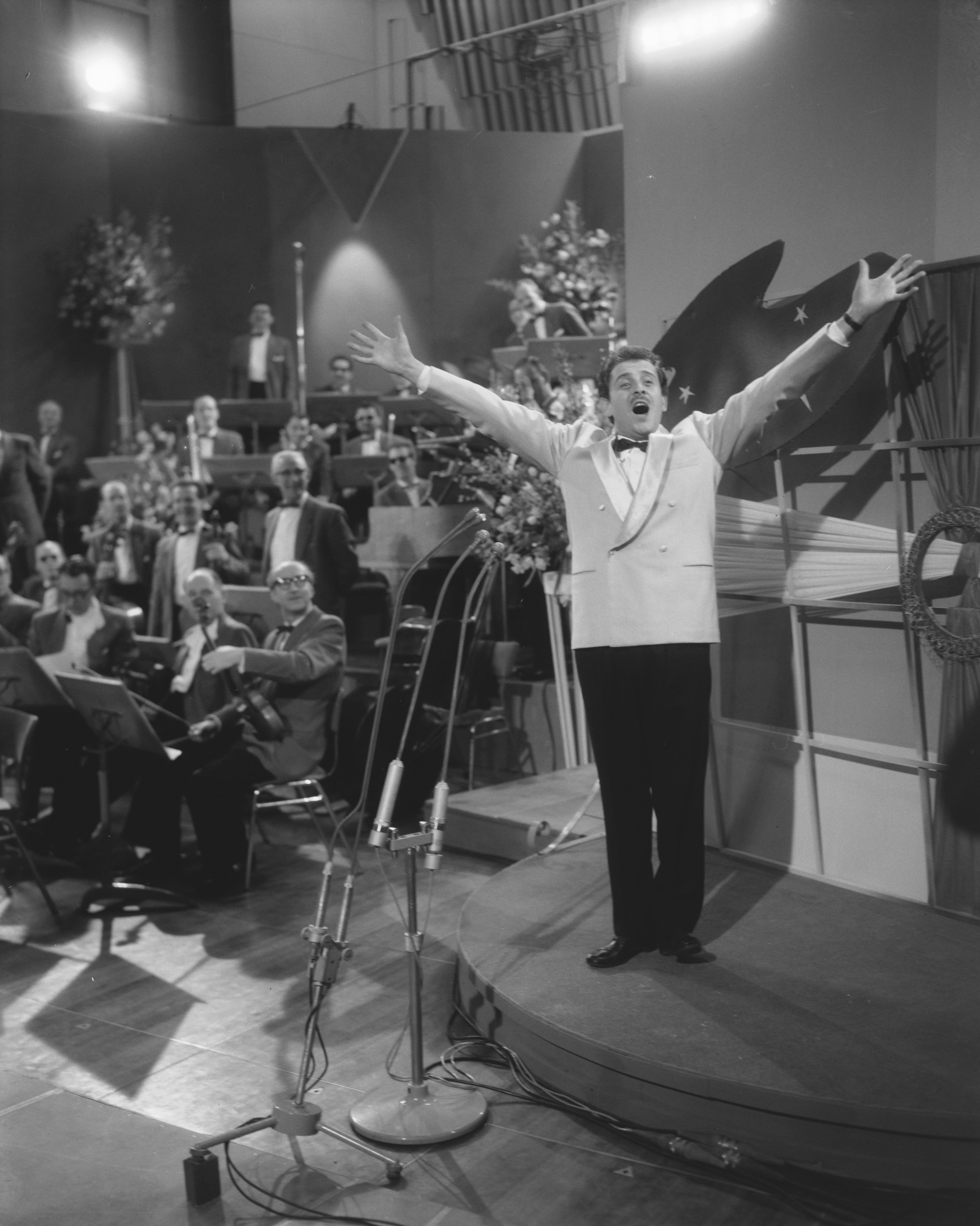
With the song "Nel blu, dipinto di blu", Modugno won the Grammy for both Record of the Year and Song of the Year in 1959.

Various songs presented during the Sanremo Music Festival over the years have become international hits, including "Nel blu, dipinto di blu" and "Piove (Ciao, ciao bambina)" by Domenico Modugno. "Nel blu, dipinto di blu" spent five non-consecutive weeks atop the US Billboard Hot 100 in August and September 1958 and subsequently became Billboard's number-one single for the year. In 1959, at the inaugural Grammy Awards, "Nel blu, dipinto di blu" became the first-ever Grammy winner for both Record of the Year and Song of the Year. The song "Io che non vivo (senza te)", sung at the fifteenth edition of the Sanremo Festival by Pino Donaggio, was recorded in English by Dusty Springfield under the title "You Don't Have to Say You Love Me". It became Springfield's most successful single, reaching number one on the UK Singles Chart and number four on the Billboard Hot 100. Elvis Presley recorded a cover version in 1970, which was a hit in both the US and the UK. Other covers have charted in the UK, Ireland, Italy, and Finland. The song "Non amarmi" by Aleandro Baldi and Francesca Alotta won the Newcomers section at the Sanremo Festival in 1992. It became an international hit, being covered as "No Me Ames" by American singers Jennifer Lopez and Marc Anthony. The song peaked at number one in the Billboard Hot Latin Songs chart. It received a Latin Grammy nomination for Best Pop Performance by a Duo/Group with Vocals. At the Billboard Latin Music Awards of 2000, the song received an award for Hot Latin Track of the Year by a Vocal Duo and two nominations for Tropical/Salsa Track of the Year and Hot Latin Track of the Year. The song "Che sarà" was sung by Ricchi e Poveri and José Feliciano at the Sanremo Festival in 1971. Feliciano's recorded version was successful in Europe, the Middle East, Japan, and Latin America. The Spanish version of "Che sarà" peaked at number one in Spain and Latin America. The winning song of the 1982 Sanremo Festival, "Storie di tutti i giorni" by Riccardo Fogli, was sung by Dutch singer Marco Borsato, with the title "Dromen zijn bedrog"; his version became one of the most successful Dutch-language singles of all time. It remained at number one in the Dutch Top 40 for twelve weeks. The song "Quando quando quando" by Tony Renis competed in the Sanremo Festival in 1962 and was covered by many international artists, becoming a best-selling single: Bobby Curtola's version charted at number ten in Canada, Engelbert Humperdinck's reached number forty in the UK, and Pat Boone's version achieved number 95 on the Billboard Hot 100.

The song "Con te partirò" was first performed by Andrea Bocelli at the 1995 Sanremo Festival, topping the charts in several European countries. A partial English version, released in 1996 as "Time to Say Goodbye", achieved greater success, selling more than twelve million copies worldwide and making it one of the best-selling singles of all time. "Non ho l'età" by Gigliola Cinquetti (1964), "Sarà perché ti amo" by Ricchi e Poveri (1981), "Maledetta primavera" by Loretta Goggi (1981), "Felicità" by Al Bano and Romina Power (1982), "L'Italiano" by Toto Cutugno (1983), "Adesso tu" by Eros Ramazzotti (1986), "La solitudine" by Laura Pausini (1993), and "Il mare calmo della sera" by Andrea Bocelli (1994) also became international hits. In 1994, the song "La mia storia tra le dita", which Gianluca Grignani sang at Sanremo, became a hit in South America, selling two million copies. Nek sang "Laura non c'è" at the Sanremo Festival in 1997, with the song becoming a hit in Europe and Latin America; the Spanish version charted in the US and peaked at number 21 in the Billboard Hot Latin Songs Chart. "Soldi" by Mahmood won the 69th Sanremo Festival and placed second in the Eurovision Song Contest 2019, topping the charts in Greece, Israel, and Lithuania, and reaching the top ten in five more countries. "Zitti e buoni" by Måneskin won both the Sanremo Festival and the Eurovision Song Contest in 2021, topping the charts in several European countries. It peaked at number seventeen on the UK Singles Chart and reached top ten on the Billboard Global Excl. U.S. chart.

In 1966, Adriano Celentano sang "Il ragazzo della via Gluck" at the Sanremo Festival. American singer Verdelle Smith sang an English version of the song, titled "Tar and Cement", which made it to number one in Australia and became one of the year's biggest sellers. The song also reached number 32 in Canada. In the US, it peaked at number 38. In Sweden, Anna-Lena Löfgren sang it with Swedish lyrics as "Lyckliga gatan", making the biggest hit of her career. The song was on the Svensktoppen weekly chart for fourteen weeks and won a Gold record in Sweden; in Norway, the song achieved Diamond and subsequently Platinum status. The song became successful in France when it was covered by Françoise Hardy, under the title "La maison où j'ai grandi".

== Hosts ==
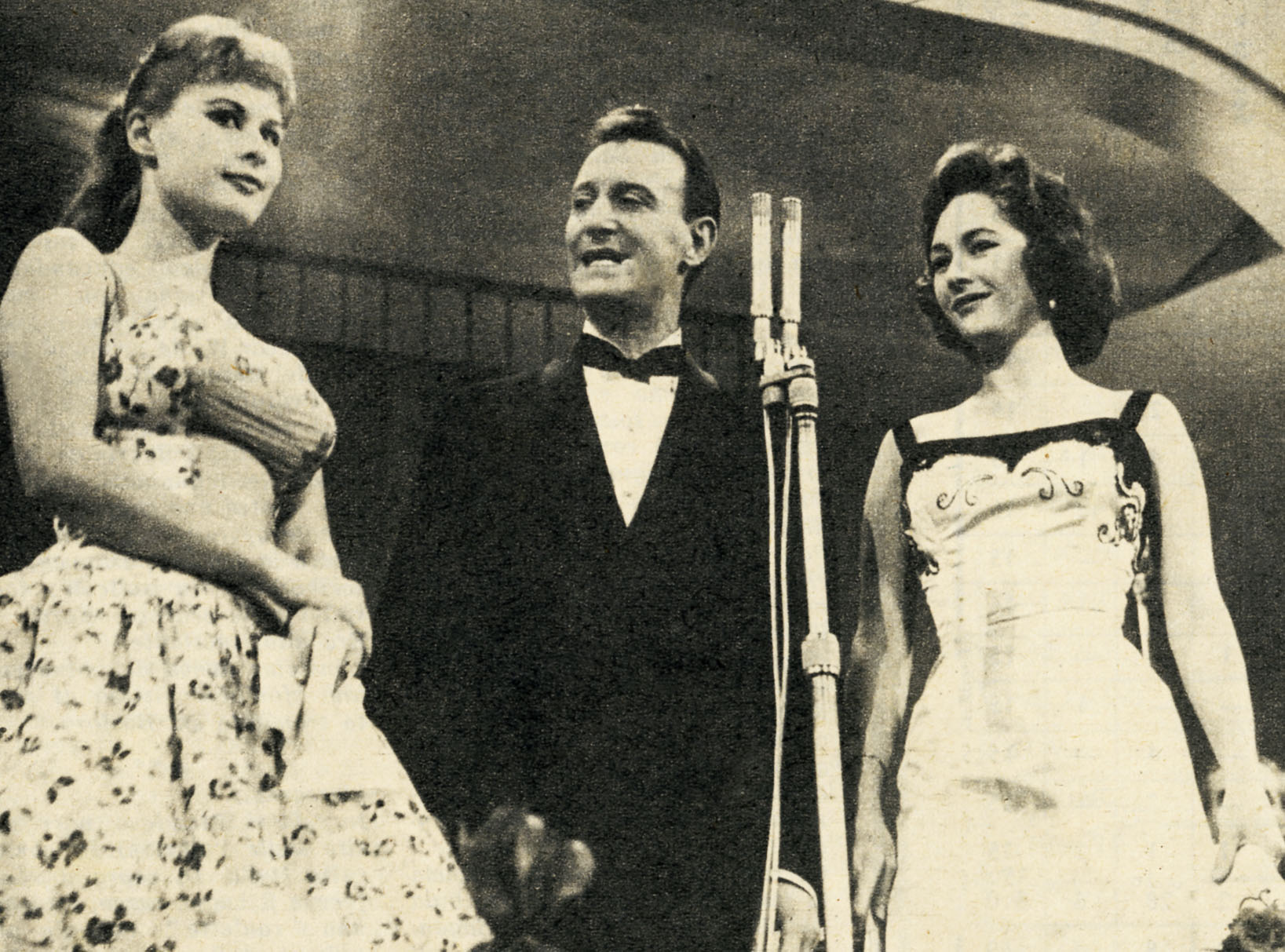
Nunzio Filogamo (center) with Marisa Allasio and Fiorella Mari at Sanremo 1957. Filogamo had also hosted the first four editions of the festival.

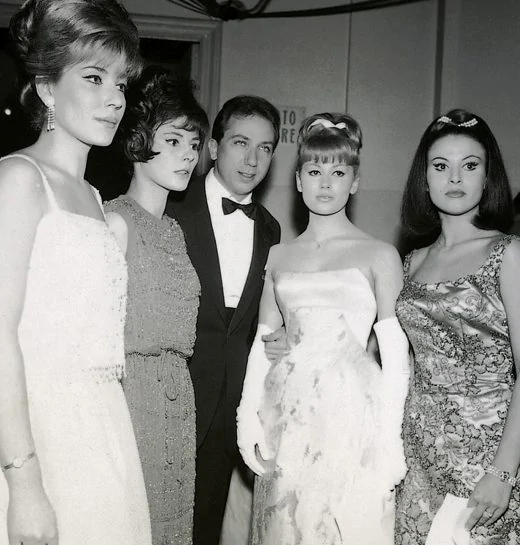
Mike Bongiorno (center) with Edy Campagnoli, Rossana Armani, Giuliana Copreni, and Maria Giovannini at Sanremo 1963. Bongiorno hosted eleven editions of the festival.

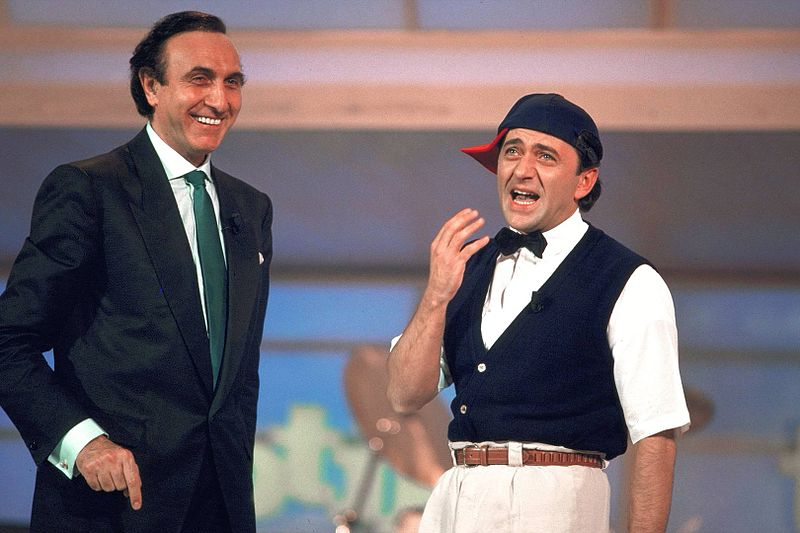
Pippo Baudo (left) presenting guest Giorgio Faletti at Sanremo 1987. Baudo hosted thirteen editions of the festival.

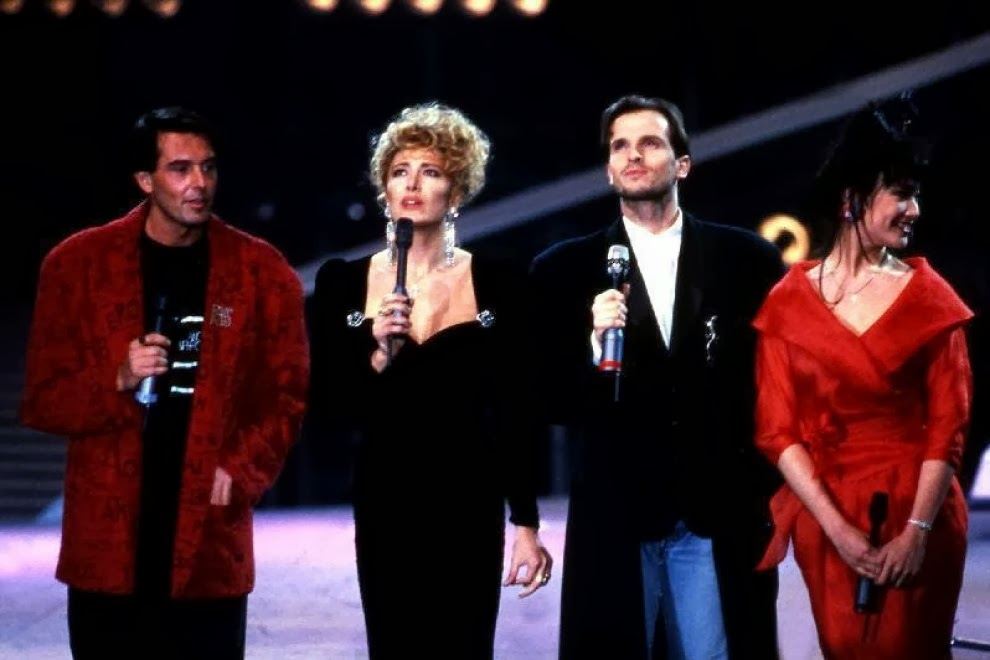
Miguel Bosé and Gabriella Carlucci (center), hosts of the Sanremo Festival in 1988

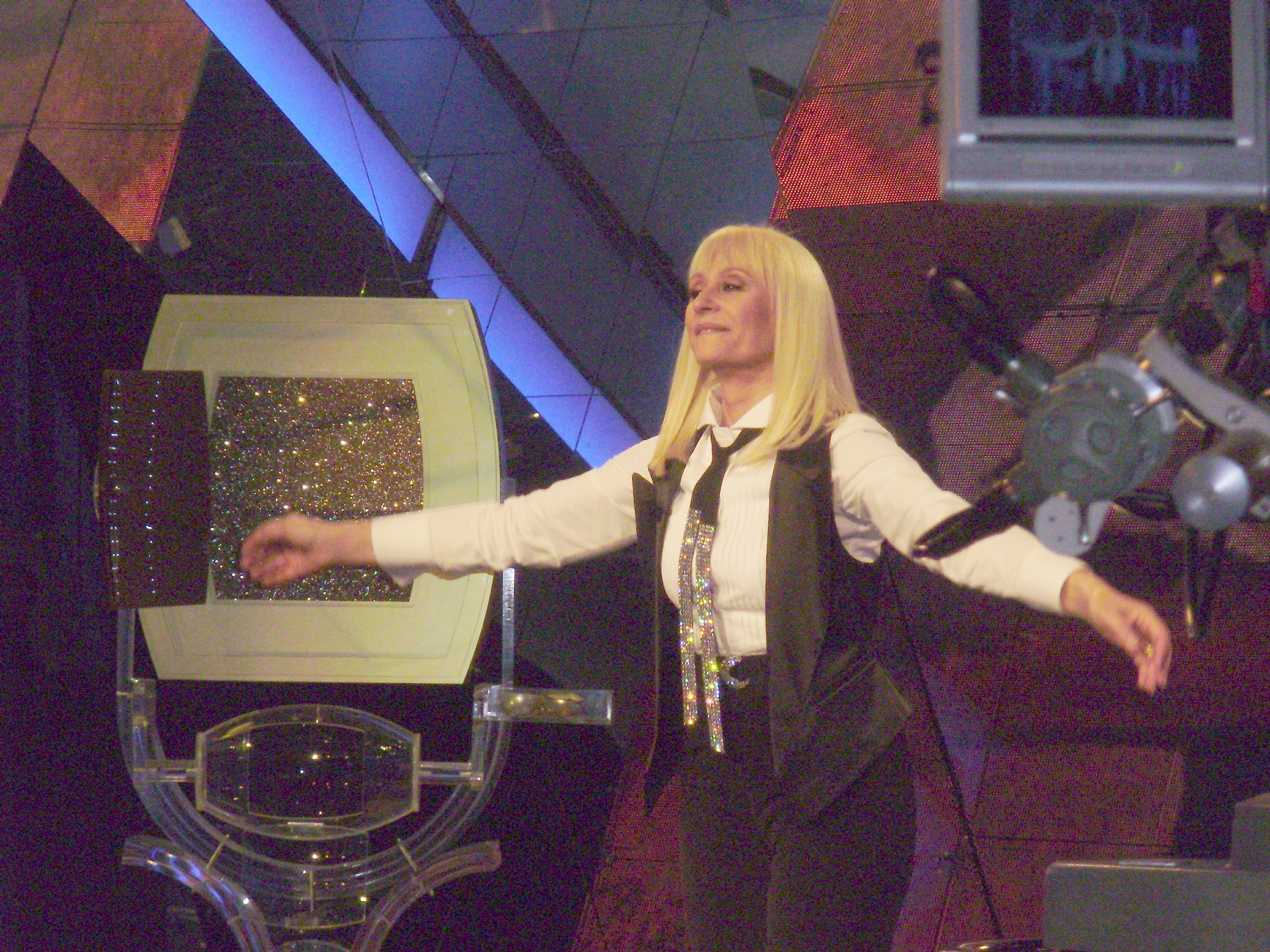
Raffaella Carrà, host of the Sanremo Festival in 2001

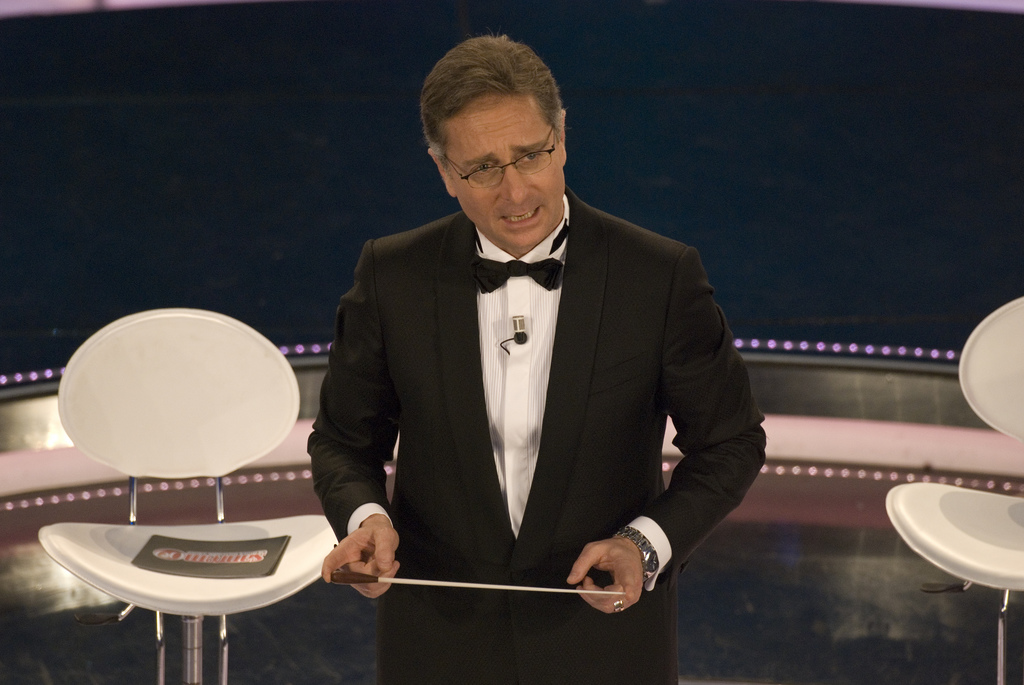
Paolo Bonolis, host of the Sanremo Festival in 2005 and 2009

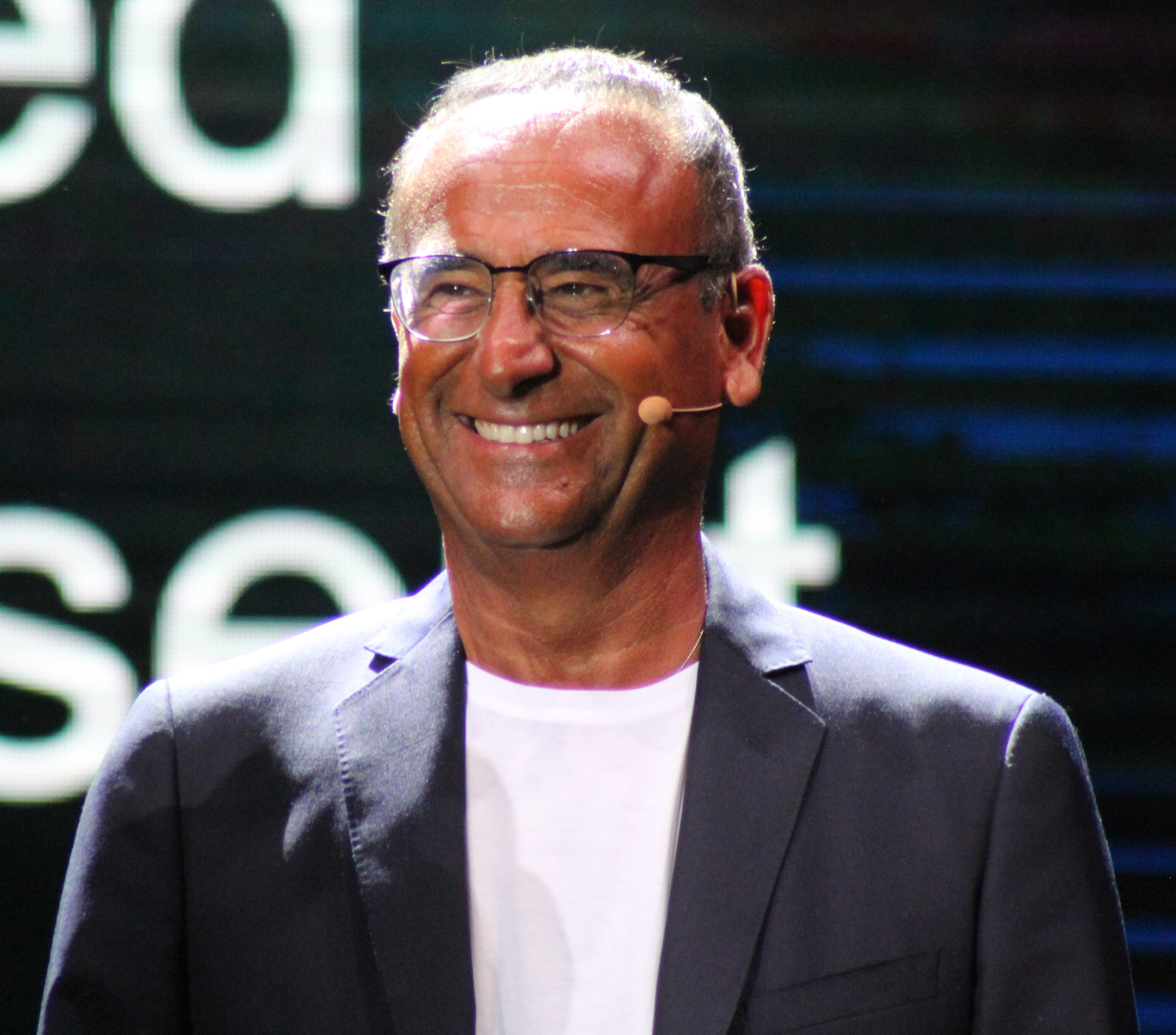
Carlo Conti, main host of the Sanremo Festival from 2015 to 2017 and again in 2025 and 2026

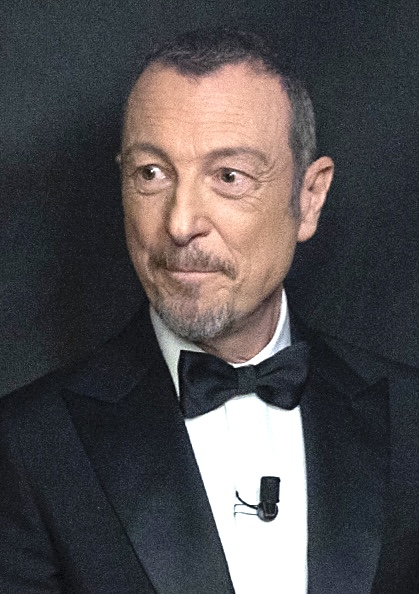
Amadeus, host of the Sanremo Festival from 2020 to 2024

The first four editions of the Sanremo Music Festival were hosted by Nunzio Filogamo. In 2003, Pippo Baudo hosted for the eleventh time, matching the record previously held by Mike Bongiorno; he later overtook this record, hosting the Sanremo Music Festival in 2007 and in 2008. Only seven women have hosted the festival as main presenters. The first women ever to host the event alone were Lilly Lembo and Giuliana Calandra in 1961, followed by Maria Giovanna Elmi in 1978, Loretta Goggi in 1986, Raffaella Carrà in 2001, Simona Ventura in 2004, and Antonella Clerici in 2010. Hosting the event between 2020 and 2024, Amadeus joined Baudo and Bongiorno in the record for the most consecutive editions hosted, i.e., five, and established himself as the presenter with the highest number of consecutive nights hosted, at 25.

Full list of festival hosts:

Year	Main presenter(s)	Co-host(s)
1951	Nunzio Filogamo	
1952	Nunzio Filogamo	
1953	Nunzio Filogamo	
1954	Nunzio Filogamo	
1955	Armando Pizzo	Maria Teresa Ruta
1956	Fausto Tommei	Maria Teresa Ruta
1957	Nunzio Filogamo	Marisa Allasio, Fiorella Mari, and Nicoletta Orsomando
1958	Gianni Agus	Fulvia Colombo
1959	Enzo Tortora	Adriana Serra
1960	Paolo Ferrari and Enza Sampò	
1961	Lilli Lembo and Giuliana Calandra	
1962	Renato Tagliani	Laura Efrikian and Vicky Ludovisi
1963	Mike Bongiorno	Rossana Armani, Edy Campagnoli, Giuliana Copreni, and Maria Giovannini
1964	Mike Bongiorno	Giuliana Lojodice
1965	Mike Bongiorno	Grazia Maria Spina
1966	Mike Bongiorno	Paola Penni and Carla Maria Puccini
1967	Mike Bongiorno	Renata Mauro
1968	Pippo Baudo	Luisa Rivelli
1969	Nuccio Costa	Gabriella Farinon
1970	Nuccio Costa	Enrico Maria Salerno and Ira von Fürstenberg
1971	Carlo Giuffrè and Elsa Martinelli	
1972	Mike Bongiorno	Sylva Koscina and Paolo Villaggio
1973	Mike Bongiorno	Gabriella Farinon
1974	Corrado	Gabriella Farinon
1975	Mike Bongiorno	Sabina Ciuffini
1976	Giancarlo Guardabassi	
1977	Mike Bongiorno	Maria Giovanna Elmi
1978	Maria Giovanna Elmi	Beppe Grillo, Stefania Casini, and Vittorio Salvetti
1979	Mike Bongiorno	Anna Maria Rizzoli
1980	Roberto Benigni	Claudio Cecchetto and Olimpia Carlisi
1981	Claudio Cecchetto	Eleonora Vallone and Nilla Pizzi
1982	Claudio Cecchetto	Patrizia Rossetti
1983	Andrea Giordana	Isabel Russinova, Emanuela Falcetti, and Anna Pettinelli
1984	Pippo Baudo	Elisabetta Gardini, Edy Angelillo, Iris Peynado, and Tiziana Pini
1985	Pippo Baudo	Patty Brard
1986	Loretta Goggi	Anna Pettinelli, Sergio Mancinelli, and Mauro Micheloni
1987	Pippo Baudo	Carlo Massarini
1988	Miguel Bosé and Gabriella Carlucci	
1989	Rosita Celentano, Paola Dominguin, Danny Quinn, and Gianmarco Tognazzi	
1990	Johnny Dorelli and Gabriella Carlucci	
1991	Andrea Occhipinti and Edwige Fenech	
1992	Pippo Baudo	Alba Parietti, Brigitte Nielsen, and Milly Carlucci
1993	Pippo Baudo	Lorella Cuccarini
1994	Pippo Baudo	Anna Oxa
1995	Pippo Baudo	Anna Falchi and Claudia Koll
1996	Pippo Baudo	Sabrina Ferilli and Valeria Mazza
1997	Mike Bongiorno	Piero Chiambretti and Valeria Marini
1998	Raimondo Vianello	Eva Herzigová and Veronica Pivetti
1999	Fabio Fazio	Laetitia Casta and Renato Dulbecco
2000	Fabio Fazio	Luciano Pavarotti, Teo Teocoli, and Inés Sastre
2001	Raffaella Carrà	Enrico Papi, Massimo Ceccherini, Piero Chiambretti, and Megan Gale
2002	Pippo Baudo	Manuela Arcuri and Vittoria Belvedere
2003	Pippo Baudo	Serena Autieri and Claudia Gerini
2004	Simona Ventura	Paola Cortellesi, Maurizio Crozza, and Gene Gnocchi
2005	Paolo Bonolis	Antonella Clerici and Federica Felini
2006	Giorgio Panariello	Ilary Blasi and Victoria Cabello
2007	Pippo Baudo and Michelle Hunziker	
2008	Pippo Baudo and Piero Chiambretti	Bianca Guaccero and Andrea Osvárt
2009	Paolo Bonolis and Luca Laurenti	
2010	Antonella Clerici	
2011	Gianni Morandi	Elisabetta Canalis, Belen Rodriguez, Luca Bizzarri, and Paolo Kessisoglu
2012	Gianni Morandi	Ivana Mrázová and Rocco Papaleo
2013	Fabio Fazio and Luciana Littizzetto	
2014	Fabio Fazio and Luciana Littizzetto	
2015	Carlo Conti	Arisa, Emma and Rocío Muñoz Morales
2016	Carlo Conti	Gabriel Garko, Virginia Raffaele, and Mădălina Ghenea
2017	Carlo Conti and Maria De Filippi	
2018	Claudio Baglioni	Michelle Hunziker, and Pierfrancesco Favino
2019	Claudio Baglioni	Virginia Raffaele, and Claudio Bisio
2020	Amadeus	Fiorello
2021	Amadeus	Fiorello
2022	Amadeus	Ornella Muti, Lorena Cesarini, Drusilla Foer, Maria Chiara Giannetta, Sabrina Ferilli
2023	Amadeus	Gianni Morandi
2024	Amadeus	Marco Mengoni, Giorgia, Teresa Mannino, Lorella Cuccarini, and Fiorello
2025	Carlo Conti	Antonella Clerici, Gerry Scotti, Bianca Balti, Cristiano Malgioglio, Nino Frassica, Miriam Leone, Elettra Lamborghini, Katia Follesa, Mahmood, Geppi Cucciari, Alessia Marcuzzi, and Alessandro Cattelan
2026	Carlo Conti and Laura Pausini	Achille Lauro, Can Yaman, Lillo, Pilar Fogliati, Irina Shayk, Ubaldo Pantani, Bianca Balti, Alessandro Siani, Giorgia Cardinaletti (main section); Gianluca Gazzoli (Newcomers' section)
2027	Stefano De Martino	TBA
2028	Stefano De Martino	TBA

== Trivia ==
- Whitney Houston, an international guest at the Sanremo Festival 1987, was the only artist to be asked for an encore performance in the history of the contest until then. After singing "All at Once", Houston received a standing ovation and the presenter, Pippo Baudo, asked her to perform again.
- Freddie Mercury, an international guest at the 1984 Sanremo Festival, did not want to lip sync (a rule at that year's festival), and, in protest, he moved the microphone away from his face a few times during his performance.
- In The Talented Mr. Ripley by Patricia Highsmith and its film adaptations, Dickie Greenleaf invites Tom Ripley to travel to the Sanremo Music Festival to enjoy some jazz, as a parting gesture before sending Ripley on his way. The ensuing events in Sanremo have major implications for all of the characters.
- In 1960, future Italian pop legend Mina Mazzini made her Sanremo debut. The contest helped launch her career.
- The song "Perdere l'amore" was proposed in 1987 by Gianni Nazzaro and rejected in the preliminary song screening. A year later, it was proposed by Massimo Ranieri and won the contest.
- In 1990, Patty Pravo turned down the opportunity to participate in the Sanremo Music Festival with "Donna con te", which was sung at the event by Anna Oxa.
- In 2007, Irene Grandi's song "Bruci la città" was rejected in the screening, mainly as a decision of that year's artistic director Pippo Baudo, who later explained that the decision was due to the poor quality of the received demo. However, the song was later released by Grandi and became one of her biggest hits.

== See also ==
- List of historic rock festivals
- Sopot International Song Festival
- Golden Orpheus
- Italy in the Eurovision Song Contest
- Eurovision Song Contest
