= Sanne Denotté =

Belgian singer

Sandra Maria Frans (Sanne) Denotté (born 22 March 1973, in Bornem) is a Belgian Flemish singer. She is famous in Flanders as a singer of Dutch-language vocal music, including Land van ons twee, the Dutch version of The Power of Love.
