= Verdelle Smith =

American singer

- Born: Asbury Verdelle Smith; 1939 (age 86–87); Petersburg, Florida, USA

Verdelle Smith (born 1939) is an American singer and actress. She had a one-hit wonder with the song Tar and Cement in 1966, an adaptation of the Italian massive hit "Il ragazzo della via Gluck" from Adriano Celentano.

== Personal life ==
Smith was born to Josephine and John Smith in Petersburg, Florida. She has eight siblings. The family moved to Neptune, New Jersey when she was one year old. She graduated from Asbury Park High School, New Jersey in 1958. She moved to New York City where she worked as a secretary. In the 1980s she earned a degree in humanities from Touro College, New York. She currently lives in Brooklyn, New York.

== Performing career ==
After arriving in New York City, Smith partnered with Billy Byrd in a song and dance act. They toured the "borscht circuit hotels" in the Catskill Mountains. They secured a recording contract with Columbia Records and their first release was Juanita in 1965.

=== Theater ===
Early in her career, Smith joined the Harlem Y Drama Workshop and appeared in several plays, including: None of us are ever born brave by Norman Harris (1965), A Streetcar Named Desire by Tennessee Williams (1965) and Shadow of the Birch Tree by Gertrude Greenidge (1967).

She won Most promising actress from Harlem "Y" Drama Workshop in 1965 and was nominated for Best supporting actress in 1966.

== Selective discography ==
=== Singles ===
Issued on Capitol Records in the United States. Some also on Capitol in Canada and Australia; EMI in the UK; Peak Records in New Zealand.

- "(Alone) In My Room" was originally a Spanish song written by Joaquin Pieto, and was later recorded by the Walker Brothers on their second LP, Portrait (1966); by Nancy Sinatra, also in 1966, for her debut album Boots; Willie and the Walkers (#40 in Canada, Jan.1968); and by Marc and the Mambas for their 1983 album Torment and Toreros. The English lyrics were also written by Lee Pockriss and Paul Vance. Her version reached #57 in Canada.
- "Oh How Much I Love You"
- "Tar and Cement": Verdelle Smith recorded "Tar and Cement", an English-language version of the 1966 Italian song "Il ragazzo della via Gluck" by singer Adriano Celentano. Her English version was written by Lee Pockriss and Paul Vance. "Tar and Cement" made it to No. 2 in Australia and to No. 38 in the United States. In Canada, it reached #32.
- "I Don't Need Anything", which was later a minor UK hit in 1967 for Sandie Shaw.
- "If You Can't Say Anything Nice About Me"
- "Baby, Baby" / "There's So Much Love All Around Me"
- "Life Goes On" / "Juanito" (1965)
- "Carnaby's Gone Away" / "Sittin' and Waitin'"
- "There`s so much love all around me"

=== Albums ===
- (Alone) In My Room, Capitol Records, 1966. Produced by Marvin Holtzman, arranged by Lee Pockriss.
- Tar and Cement—The Complete Recordings 1965–1967, Omni Recordings, 2013.
