= Eleftheria Arvanitaki discography =

- Studio albums: 14
- Soundtrack albums: 1
- Live albums: 1
- Compilation albums: 5
- Singles: 4

This page includes the discography of Greek singer Eleftheria Arvanitaki.

== Albums ==
Year	Title	Certification	Ref.
1984	Eleftheria Arvanitaki	-	
1986	Kontrabanto	Platinum	
1989	Tanirama	-	
1991	Meno Ektos	Gold	
1993	I Nihta Katevainei	-	
1994	Ta Kormia Kai Ta Maheria	Platinum	
1995	Megales Epitihies (Greatest Hits)	-	
1996	Tragoudia Gia Tous Mines	Platinum	
1998	Ektos Programmatos	2× Platinum	
2001	Ekpombi	Gold	
2002	Eleftheria Arvanitaki - Live	Gold	
2004	Ola Sto Fos	Platinum	
2006	Grigora I Ora Perase	Gold	
2008	Kai Ta Matia Kai I Kardia	Gold	
2010	Prosopo Me Prosopo		
2015	9 + 1 istories		
2019	Ta Megala Taxidia		
2024	Kai Simera Kai Avrio Kai Tora	-	

- She also took part in four more albums with "Opisthodromiki Kompania".

== CD singles ==
Year	Title	Certification
1995	"Zontana Stous Vrahous"	Platinum
2000	"Tragoudia Gia Tous Mines: The Third Side" (Songs for the months: The third side)	-
2004	"Tria Tragoudia" (Three songs)	Gold
2007	"Min Orkizesai" (Don't take an oath)	-

== Compilations ==
Year	Title	Certification
1995	Megales Epitihies (Greatest hits)	-
1999	The Very Best of 1989-1998 International Release	-
2005	Dromoi Paralliloi	-
2006	Stis Akres Ap' Ta Matia Sou/To the Edge of Your Eyes International Release	-
2007	Dinata 1986-2007	Gold

== Soundtracks ==
Year	Title	Certification
1993	Anastasia: Three track soundtrack: "Anastasia", "Na 'he I Nikta Akri", and "Thelo Na Se Do"	Platinum
