= Accetto miracoli: l'esperienza degli altri =

2020 Tiziano Ferro album

Studio album by Tiziano Ferro
- Released: 6 November 2020
- Genre: Pop • R&B
- Length: 50:10
- Language: Italian
- Label: Virgin • Universal
- Producer: Tiziano Ferro; Marco Sonzini

Tiziano Ferro chronology
Accetto miracoli (2019)	Accetto miracoli: l'esperienza degli altri (2020)	Il mondo è nostro (2022)

Singles from Accetto miracoli: l'esperienza degli altri
- 1. "Perdere l'amore" Released: 3 August 2020; 2. "Rimmel" Released: 2 September 2020; 3. "E ti vengo a cercare" Released: 30 October 2020

Accetto miracoli: l'esperienza degli altri ("I Accept Miracles: The Experience of Others") is a covers album by Italian singer Tiziano Ferro, released on 6 November 2020.

== Development and release ==
When Ferro performed as a regular guest at the Sanremo Music Festival 2020, he sang four songs originated by other artists: "Nel blu dipinto di blu" by Domenico Modugno (1948); "Almeno tu nell'universo" by Mia Martini (1989); "Portami a ballare" di Luca Barbarossa (1992); and "Perdere l'amore" by Massimo Ranieri (1988), which Ferro performed in duet with Ranieri himself. Months later Ferro was contacted by the I Love My Radio project, aimed at celebrating the 45th anniversary of the Italian radio system, to record a cover in the studio. Ferro sent his own version of "Bella d'estate" (1987) by Mango, and though I Love My Radio ultimately used his duet of "Perdere l'amore", Ferro now had five songs for a potential cover album.

Accetto miracoli: l'esperienza degli altri was released on 6 November 2020. The album contains 13 tracks, including the previously mentioned five songs, as well as Ferro's renditions of: "Rimmel" by Francesco De Gregori (1975); "Morirò d'amore by Giuni Russo (2003); "Margherita" by Riccardo Cocciante (1976); "E ti vengo a cercare" by Franco Battiato (1988); "Cigarettes and Coffee" by Scialpi (1984); "Piove" by Jovanotti (1994); "Ancora, ancora, ancora" by Mina (1978); and "Non escludo il ritorno" by Franco Califano (2005).

== Track listing ==
No.	Title	Lyrics	Music	Original artist	Length
1.	"Rimmel"	Francesco De Gregori	Francesco De Gregori	Francesco De Gregori	3:36
2.	"Morirò d'amore"	Giuni Russo, Maria Antonietta Sisini, Vania Magelli	Giuni Russo, Maria Antonietta Sisini	Giuni Russo	3:44
3.	"Bella d'estate"	Lucio Dalla	Giuseppe Mango	Mango	4:01
4.	"Margherita"	Riccardo Cocciante, Marco Luberti	Riccardo Cocciante, Marco Luberti	Riccardo Cocciante	4:38
5.	"E ti vengo a cercare"	Franco Battiato	Franco Battiato	Franco Battiato	3:24
6.	"Almeno tu nell'universo"	Bruno Lauzi	Maurizio Fabrizio	Mia Martini	4:54
7.	"Cigarettes and Coffee"	Giovanni Scialpi, Franco Migliacci	Giovanni Scialpi	Scialpi	3:53
8.	"Perdere l'amore" (with Massimo Ranieri)	Giampiero Artegiani, Marcello Marrocchi	Giampiero Artegiani, Marcello Marrocchi	Massimo Ranieri	4:12
9.	"Piove" (with Box of Beats)	Jovanotti	Jovanotti, Luca Cersosimo	Jovanotti	2:42
10.	"Portami a ballare"	Luca Barbarossa	Luca Barbarossa	Luca Barbarossa	3:44
11.	"Nel blu dipinto di blu"	Franco Migliacci, Domenico Modugno	Domenico Modugno	Domenico Modugno	3:39
12.	"Ancora, ancora, ancora"	Cristiano Malgioglio	Gian Pietro Felisatti	Mina	3:48
13.	"Non escludo il ritorno"	Franco Califano, Federico Zampaglione	Federico Zampaglione	Franco Califano	3:55

Bonus content of the special edition (double CD, digital download)

No.	Title	Lyrics	Music	Notes	Length
1.	"Vai ad amarti"	Tiziano Ferro	Tiziano Ferro		4:07
2.	"Amici per errore"	Tiziano Ferro, Massimiliano Pelan, Francesco Gramegna	Tiziano Ferro, Massimiliano Pelan, Francesco Gramegna		2:53
3.	"Balla per me" (with Jovanotti)	Tiziano Ferro	Tiziano Ferro		3:25
4.	"In mezzo a questo inverno"	Tiziano Ferro, Fabio De Martino, Francesco Gramegna	Tiziano Ferro, Massimiliano Pelan, Fabio De Martino		3:45
5.	"Come farebbe un uomo"	Tiziano Ferro, Emanuele Dabbono	Tiziano Ferro, Emanuele Dabbono		3:30
6.	"Seconda pelle"	Tiziano Ferro, Giordana Angi	Tiziano Ferro, Giordana Angi		3:35
7.	"Il destino di chi visse per amare"	Tiziano Ferro	Tiziano Ferro, Sergio Ciccarelli		4:10
8.	"Le 3 parole sono 2"	Tiziano Ferro	Tiziano Ferro		3:50
9.	"Casa a Natale"	Tiziano Ferro, Giordana Angi	Tiziano Ferro, Giordana Angi		4:06
10.	"Un uomo pop"	Tiziano Ferro	Tiziano Ferro		3:13
11.	"Buona (cattiva) sorte"	Tiziano Ferro, Emanuele Dabbono, Giordana Angi	Tiziano Ferro, Emanuele Dabbono, Giordana Angi		3:14
12.	"Accetto miracoli"	Tiziano Ferro	Giordana Angi, Antonio Iammarino		3:31
13.	"In mezzo a questo inverno" (Reyes Cut)	Tiziano Ferro, Fabio De Martino, Francesco Gramegna	Tiziano Ferro, Massimiliano Pelan, Fabio De Martino	Digital edition only	3:24
14.	"Accetto miracoli" (Reyes Cut)	Tiziano Ferro	Giordana Angi, Antonio Iammarino	Digital edition only	3:05

== Charts ==
=== Weekly charts ===
Chart (2020/21)	Peak position
Croatian International Albums (HDU)	26
Italian Albums (FIMI)	1

=== Year-end charts ===
Chart (2021)	Position
Italian Albums (FIMI)	75
