= Inseguendo l'aquila =

Studio album by Mango
- Released: 1988
- Genre: Pop
- Label: Fonit Cetra
- Producer: Alberto Salerno, Armando Mango

Mango chronology
Adesso (1987)	Inseguendo l'aquila (1988)	Sirtaki (1990)

Inseguendo l'aquila (lit. 'Chasing the eagle') is the seventh studio album released by Mango, in 1988.

The album also was released in Spain under the name Hierro y fuego.

Mango's future wife Laura Valente did back-up vocals on the record.

== Track listing ==
=== Inseguendo l'aquila ===
No.	Title	Writer(s)	Length
1.	"Ferro e fuoco"	Mango, A. Mango, A. Salerno	4:09
2.	"Trovando te... cercandomi"	Mango, A. Mango	4:19
3.	"Oasi"	Mango, A. Salerno	4:19
4.	"Il mare calmissimo"	Mango, A. Mango, A. Salerno	4:36
5.	"Seduto all'ombra... fu così"	A. Mango	4:10
6.	"Mia madre"	Mango, A. Salerno	5:07
7.	"Inseguendo l'aquila"	Mango, A. Mango, A. Salerno	4:36
8.	"Le bugie degli angeli"	A. Mango	5:01
9.	"Immersione in te"	Mango, A. Mango, A. Salerno	5:16

=== Hierro y fuego ===
1. "Hierro y fuego"
2. "Hallandote... Buscandome"
3. "Oasis"
4. "Mare en calma"
5. "En La Penumbra... Yo Pense"
6. "Madre"
7. "Persiguiendo Al Aguila"
8. "Las Mentiras De Los Angeles"
9. "Se Esconde En Ti"

== Charts ==
Chart	Peak position
Italy (Musica e dischi)	13

== Personnel ==
- Mango - lead vocals, choir, keyboards
- Rocco Petruzzi - keyboards
- Graziano Accinni - guitar
- Lele Melotti - drums
- Steve Ferrera - drums
- Paolo Costa - bass
- Max Costa - computer programming
- Laura Valente - choir
