= Lei verrà =

Single by Mango

from the album Odissea
- B-side: "Show"
- Released: 1986
- Genre: Pop
- Label: Fonit Cetra
- Songwriters: Mango and Alberto Salerno
- Producer: Alberto Salerno

Mango singles chronology
"Il viaggio" (1985)	"Lei verrà" (1986)	"Dal cuore in poi" (1987)

Music video
- "Lei verrà" on YouTube

"Lei verrà" (transl. She will come) is an Italian song composed by Mango and Alberto Salerno and performed by Mango. It is included in the 1986 album Odissea.

== Overview ==
The song was entered into the main competition at the 36th edition of the Sanremo Music Festival, ranking only 14th. The single eventually was a commercial success, being awarded gold disc for having sold over 150,000 copies. The same year a duet version of the song performed by Mango and Loretta Goggi was included in the Goggi's album C'è poesia.

In 2019 Giorgia recorded a cover version of the song, released as third single from her album Pop Heart.

The song has been described as "an elegant and unconventional ballad, with a captivating melody", whose lyrics are "based on ambiguity and free interpretation" and create "an indefinable, almost suspended feeling [that] permeates the entire [song's] narrative".

== Track listing ==
- 7" single – Fonit Cetra SP 1837
1. "Lei verrà" (Mango - Alberto Salerno) - 4:00
2. "Stella del nord" (Mango - Alberto Salerno) - 4:00

== Charts ==
Chart (1991)	Peak position
Italy (Musica e dischi)	4
