= Sanremo Music Festival 1986 =

Italian song contest (36th edition)

Dates and venue
- Semi-final 1: 13 February 1986
- Semi-final 2: 14 February 1986
- Final: 15 February 1986
- Venue: Teatro Ariston; Sanremo, Italy

Organisation
- Broadcaster: Radiotelevisione italiana (RAI)
- Artistic director: Gianni Ravera
- Presenters: Loretta Goggi and Anna Pettinelli, Mauro Micheloni, Sergio Mancinelli

Big Artists section
- Number of entries: 22
- Winner: "Adesso tu" Eros Ramazzotti

Newcomers' section
- Number of entries: 14
- Winner: "Grande grande amore" Lena Biolcati

The Sanremo Music Festival 1986 (Italian: Festival di Sanremo 1986), officially the 36th Italian Song Festival (36º Festival della canzone italiana), was the 36th edition of the annual Sanremo Music Festival, a television song contest held at the Teatro Ariston in Sanremo, organised and broadcast by Radiotelevisione italiana (RAI). The show was hosted by Loretta Goggi, assisted by the trio Anna Pettinelli, Mauro Micheloni and Sergio Mancinelli, who at the time were the presenters of the musical show Discoring.

The winner of the Big Artists section was Eros Ramazzotti with the song "Adesso tu", while Enrico Ruggeri won the Critics Award with the song "Rien ne va plus". Lena Biolcati won the Newcomers section with the song "Grande grande amore".

== Participants and results ==
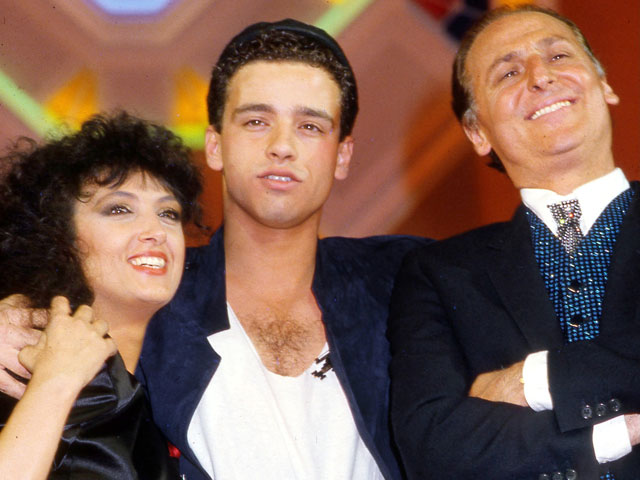
The first three places of Sanremo 1986, left to right: Marcella Bella, Eros Ramazzotti and Renzo Arbore

=== Big Artists ===
Big Artists section
| Song | Artist(s) | Songwriter(s) | Rank |
|---|---|---|---|
| "Adesso tu" | Eros Ramazzotti | Eros Ramazzotti; Piero Cassano; Adelio Cogliati | 1 |
| "Il clarinetto" | Renzo Arbore | Claudio Mattone; Renzo Arbore | 2 |
| "Senza un briciolo di testa" | Marcella Bella | Gianni Bella; Mogol; Geoff Westley | 3 |
| "Azzurra malinconia" | Toto Cutugno | Toto Cutugno | 4 |
| "È tutto un attimo" | Anna Oxa | Adelio Cogliati; Franco Ciani; Mario Lavezzi; Umberto Smaila | 5 |
| "Futuro" | Orietta Berti | Umberto Balsamo; Lorenzo Raggi | 6 |
| "Vai" | Nino D'Angelo | Nino D'Angelo; Antonio Annona | 7 |
| "Cantare" | Fred Bongusto | Sergio Iodice; Fred Bongusto; Mimmo Di Francia | 8 |
| "Re" | Loredana Bertè | Armando Mango; Giuseppe Mango | 9 |
| "Fatti miei" | Fiordaliso | Zucchero Fornaciari; Enzo Malepasso; Luigi Albertelli | 10 |
| "Uno sull'altro" | Marco Armani | Pietro Armenise; Marco Armani | 11 |
| "Canzone italiana" | Sergio Endrigo | Claudio Mattone; Sergio Endrigo | 12 |
| "Amore stella" | Donatella Rettore | Guido Morra; Maurizio Fabrizio | 13 |
| "Lei verrà" | Mango | Giuseppe Mango; Alberto Salerno | 14 |
| "Innamoratissimo" | Righeira | Stefano Rota; Stefano Righi; La Bionda; Sergio Conforti; Cristiano Minellono | 15 |
| "No East, No West" | Scialpi | Franco Migliacci; Giovanni Scialpi; Thoty | 16 |
| "Rien ne va plus" | Enrico Ruggeri | Enrico Ruggeri | 17 / Critics Award |
| "Via Margutta" | Luca Barbarossa | Luca Barbarossa | 18 |
| "Verso il 2000" | Flavia Fortunato | Antonello de Sanctis; Alberto Cheli; Elio Palumbo | 19 |
| "Brividi" | Rossana Casale | Guido Morra; Maurizio Fabrizio | 20 |
| "Canzone triste (Canzone d'amore)" | Zucchero | Zucchero Fornaciari | 21 |
| "Canzoni alla radio" | Stadio | Luca Carboni; Gaetano Curreri; Ricky Portera | 22 |

=== Newcomers ===
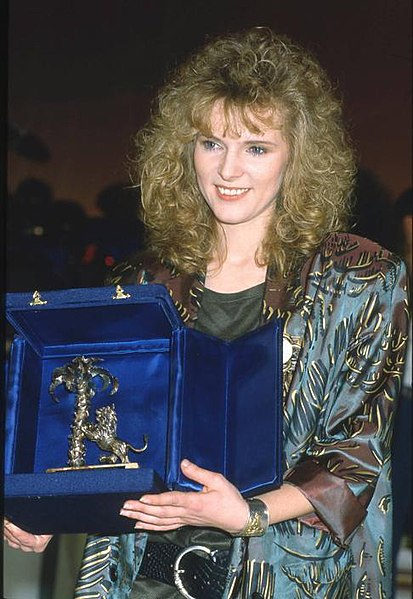
Lena Biolcati holding her prize

Newcomers section
| Song | Artist(s) | Songwriter(s) | Rank |
|---|---|---|---|
| "Grande grande amore" | Lena Biolcati | Stefano D'Orazio; Maurizio Fabrizio | 1 |
| "La nave va" | Aleandro Baldi | Aleandro Baldi | 2 |
| "E le rondini sfioravano il grano" | Giampiero Artegiani | Giampiero Artegiani; Marcello Marrocchi | 3 |
| "E camminiamo" | Lanfranco Carnacina | Piero Calabrese; Francesco Ventura; Lanfranco Carnacina | 4 |
| "Ipnotica" | Meccano | Elio Aldrighetti; Walter Bassani | 5 |
| "Ma non finisce mica qui" | Francesco Hertz | Guido Morra; Maurizio Fabrizio | 6 |
| "Come una guerra" | Chiari e Forti | Cheope; Ottavio Angelillo | 7 |
| "Azzurra anima" | Nova Schola Cantorum | Lucio Macchiarella; Alberto Cheli | Eliminated |
| "Croce del Sud" | Aida Satta Flores | Elio Aldrighetti; Aida Satta Flores; Sergio Cossu | Eliminated |
| "L'uomo di ieri" | Paola Turci | Mario Castelnuovo; Gaio Chiocchio | Eliminated |
| "Nessun dolore" | Anna Bussotti | Alberto Salerno; Pino Mango | Eliminated |
| "Quando l'unica sei tu" | Ivano Calcagno | Adelio Cogliati; Moreno Ferrara | Eliminated |
| "Ribelle su questa terra" | Miani | Giovanni Miani; Piero Montanari | Eliminated |
| "Scherzi della vita" | Gatto Panceri | Gatto Panceri; Piero Cassano | Eliminated |

== Broadcasts ==
=== Local broadcasts ===
All shows were broadcast on Rai Uno at 20:30 CET.

=== International broadcasts ===
Known details on the broadcasts in each country, including the specific broadcasting stations and commentators are shown in the tables below.

International broadcasters of the Sanremo Music Festival 1986
| Country | Broadcaster | Channel(s) | Commentator(s) | Ref(s) |
|---|---|---|---|---|
| Australia | 2SER | | | |
| Czechoslovakia | ČST | ČST2 (Note: Delayed broadcast in a shortened format on 15 March 1986 at 22:25 (CEST)) | | |
| Estonian SSR | ETV (Note: Delayed broadcast on 14 March at 22:50 (EEST)) | | | |
| Finland | YLE | TV1 | | |
| Germany Ireland Italy Netherlands Portugal | Europa TV (Note: Delayed broadcast on 16 March at 18:55 (CEST)) | | | |
| South Korea | KBS | KBS 2FM (Note: Delayed broadcast on 9 March 1986 at 11:00 (KST)) | | |
| Yugoslavia | JRT | TV Beograd 1, TV Titograd 1 | | |
| Yugoslavia | JRT | TV Ljubljana 1 | | |
| Yugoslavia | JRT | TV Novi Sad | | |
| Yugoslavia | JRT | TV Prishtina | | |
| Yugoslavia | JRT | TV Sarajevo 1 | | |
| Yugoslavia | JRT | TV Zagreb 1 | | |
