= Sirtaki (album) =

Studio album by Mango
- Released: 1990
- Genre: Pop
- Label: Fonit Cetra
- Producers: Geoff Westley, Mauro Paoluzzi

Mango chronology
Inseguendo l’aquila (1988)	Sirtaki (1990)	Come l'acqua (1992)

Sirtaki is the eighth studio album by Mango, released in 1990.

It stands as Mango's biggest selling album and including hits like "Nella mia città", "Tu... sì" and "Come Monna Lisa".

In 1991 the album also was released in Spain.

British singer Leo Sayer performed a version of "Tu... sì" called "The Moth And The Flame" at the 1990 Sanremo Music Festival. "Come Monna Lisa" was covered by Greek singer Eleftheria Arvanitaki on the compilation album Dinata 1986-2007. The song was renamed "Min Orkizesai".

== Track listing ==
=== Italian release ===
No.	Title	Writer(s)	Length
1.	"Nella mia città"	Mango, Mogol	6:55
2.	"I giochi del vento sul lago salato"	Mango, Mogol	4:30
3.	"Terra bianca"	Mango, A. Mango	5:15
4.	"Ma com'è rossa la ciliegia"	Mango, Mogol	4:14
5.	"Tu... sì"	Mango, A. Mango	3:22
6.	"Sirtaki"	Mango, Mogol	5:07
7.	"Come Monna Lisa"	Mango, Mogol	4:44
8.	"Preludio incantevole"	Mango, Mogol	4:44
9.	"Così viaggiando"	Mango, A. Mango	4:26
10.	"L'Io"	Mango, G. Morra	4:13
11.	"Ma che musica c'è"	Mango, A. Mango, R. Petruzzi	3:30

=== Spanish release ===
1. "Mi ciudad"
2. "Los Juegos Del Viento"
3. "Tierra blanca"
4. "¿Porqué Son Rojas Las Cerezas?"
5. "Sirtaki"
6. "Como Monna Lisa"
7. "Preludio Encantado"
8. "Viajando"
9. "Tú... Sí"

== Charts ==
Chart	Peak position
Italy (Musica e dischi)	3
