= Odissea =

Studio album by Mango
- Released: 1986
- Genre: Pop
- Label: Fonit Cetra
- Producer: Alberto Salerno

Mango chronology
Australia (1985)	Odissea (1986)	Adesso (1987)

Odissea ("Odyssey") is the fifth studio album released by Mango, in 1986.

The album contains some of his most known songs - "Lei verrà" and "Oro" - and two songs in English language - "Love is just a melody" and "Modern love" co-written with Simon Marsh. "Oro" was originally called "Mama voodoo" with lyrics by the singer's brother Armando Mango. Later, the title was changed and the final lyrics were written by Mogol.

Brian Auger provided hammond organ on the album.

Italian singer Mina covered "Oro" on Canarino mannaro (1994).

== Track listing ==
No.	Title	Writer(s)	Length
1.	"Odissea"	Mango, A. Salerno	3:49
2.	"Lei verrà"	Mango, A. Salerno	4:04
3.	"Mi sembra luna"	Mango, A. Salerno	4:12
4.	"Love is just a melody"	Mango, S. Marsh	4:28
5.	"Show"	Mango, A. Salerno	3:44
6.	"In ogni direzione che vuoi tu"	Mango, A. Salerno	4:27
7.	"Modern Love"	Mango, S. Marsh	4:24
8.	"La rosa dell'inverno"	Mango, A. Salerno	3:04
9.	"I movimento di un'idea"	Mango, A. Salerno	3:52
10.	"Lei verrà (instrumental)"	Mango	5:36
11.	"Oro"	Mango, Mogol	4:29
12.	"Lungo bacio, lungo abbraccio"	Mango, Mogol	4:24

== Charts ==
Chart	Peak position
Italy (Musica e dischi)	12

== Personnel ==
- Mango - lead vocals, choir, keyboards
- Mauro Paoluzzi - guitars, percussion
- Aldo Banfi - synclavier, synclavier programming
- Amedeo Bianchi - sax, trumpet
- Brian Auger - hammond organ
- Laura Valente, Demi Laino - choirs
- Andrea Ballista - choir in "Lei verrà"
