= Adesso =

Studio album by Mango
- Released: 1987
- Genre: Pop
- Label: Fonit Cetra
- Producers: Alberto Salerno; Mauro Malavasi

Mango chronology
Odissea (1986)	Adesso (1987)	Inseguendo l’aquila (1988)

Adesso is the sixth studio album released by Mango, in 1987.

The album is known for the single "Bella d'estate", which was co-written with Lucio Dalla. The singer's brother Armando Mango contributed to the songwriting. The CD version contains two additional tracks: "Inseguendo il vento" and "Dove andrò", the latter from the album Australia (1985).

The album was released in Spain under the name Ahora.

== Track listing ==
=== Adesso ===
No.	Title	Writer(s)	Length
1.	"Bella d'estate"	Mango, Lucio Dalla	4:58
2.	"Arcobaleni"	Mango, A. Salerno	3:55
3.	"Attimi"	Mango, A. Mango, A. Salerno	4:18
4.	"Raggio di sole"	Mango, A. Salerno	2:47
5.	"Dal cuore in poi"	Mango, A. Mango, A. Salerno	3:40
6.	"Sera latina"	Mango, A. Mango	4:19
7.	"Stella del nord"	Mango, A. Salerno	4:13
8.	"Sogni"	Mango, A. Salerno	3:13
9.	"Abiti nobili"	Mango, A. Mango, A. Salerno	4:12
10.	"Sensazione d'aria"	Mango, A. Mango, A. Salerno	3:58
11.	"Inseguendo il vento"	Mango, A. Salerno	4:29
12.	"Dove andrò"	Mango, A. Salerno	4:00

=== Ahora ===
1. "Flor de verano"
2. "Arcobaleni"
3. "Attimi"
4. "Raggio di sole"
5. "Dal cuore in poi"
6. "Noche latina"
7. "Estrella del norte"
8. "Sogni"
9. "Hábitos"
10. "Sensazione d'aria"

== Charts ==
Chart	Peak position
Italy	5

== Personnel ==
- Mango - lead vocals, choir, keyboards
- Graziano Accinni - guitar
- Rocco Petruzzi - keyboards, drums concept
- Luca Malaguti - bass on "Sera Latina"
- Aldo Banfi - keyboards on "Dove andrò"
- Mauro Paoluzzi - guitar on "Dove andrò"
- Lele Melotti - drums, percussion on "Dove andrò"
