= Oro (Mango song) =

Single by Mango

from the album Odissea
- B-side: "Lungo bacio, lungo abbraccio"
- Released: 1984
- Length: 4:30
- Label: Fonit Cetra
- Songwriters: Mango, Mogol
- Producer: Alberto Salerno

Mango singles chronology
| "È pericoloso sporgersi" (1982) | "Oro" (1984) | "Australia" (1985) |

Audio
- "Oro" on YouTube

"Oro" (transl. "Gold") is a 1984 Italian song composed by Mango (music) and Mogol (lyrics) and performed by Mango. It is included in the 1986 album Odissea.

== Overview ==
The song was originally recorded as a demo as "Mama Woodoo" with lyrics of Mango's brother Armando, before being re-written by Mogol and marking the breakout of Mango.

The song has been described as "a happy compromise between modernity and tradition", and "a slow and enveloping song, crafted with originality, but with Brit-pop models such as Peter Gabriel and Human League firmly in mind".

Artists who covered the song include Loredana Bertè and Mina, who recorded a version in a Lucio Battisti-style arrangement in the album Canarino mannaro.

== Track listing ==
| No. | Title | Writer(s) | Length |
|---|---|---|---|
| 1. | "Oro" | Pino Mango, Mogol | 4:30 |
| 2. | "Lungo bacio, lungo abbraccio" | Mango, Mogol | 4:23 |

== Charts ==
| Chart (2014) | Peak position |
|---|---|
| Italy (FIMI) | 28 |

== Certifications ==
| Region | Certification | Certified units/sales |
|---|---|---|
| Italy (FIMI) Only sales from 2009 | Gold | 35,000^{‡} |
^{‡} Sales+streaming figures based on certification alone.
