= Ektos Programmatos =

Live album by Eleftheria Arvanitaki
- Released: (Greece) 1998
- Genre: Laika
- Label: PolyGram Greece, Mercury

Eleftheria Arvanitaki chronology
Tragoudia Gia Tous Mines (1996)	Ektos Programmatos (1998)	The Very Best of 1989-1998 (1999)

Ektos Programmatos (Off The Road) is a live album by popular Greek artist Eleftheria Arvanitaki, and it was released in 1998 by Polygram Greece. The album includes "old-time classic" Greek songs that Eleftheria and her band used to play and sing during the breaks of their tours, after the end of concerts, etc...The album sold over 100,000 copies in Greece and was certified Double Platinum.

This is her first album to be imprinted with the Mercury Records label, as her previous albums with Polygram Greece were Polydor Records items. Universal Music Greece has since continued to assign the Mercury label to her local releases.

== Track listing ==
=== Disc 1 ===
1. "Solo Serviko, Solo Bouzouki" (Instrumental)
2. "To Ksefantoma"
3. "Apopse Sto Diko Sou Mahala"
4. "As Ein' Kala T' Agori Mou"
5. "Kindynos Thanatos"
6. "Ti Simera, Ti Avrio, Ti Tora"
7. "Siganopsihalisma"
8. "Parastratisa Gia Sena"
9. "Gennithika Gia Na Pono"
10. "Synnefiasmeni Kyriaki"
11. "Den Klaio Gia Tora"
12. "Oso Axizeis Esy"
13. "To Pouli"
14. "To Paploma"

=== Disc 2 ===
1. "Hilies Vradies
2. "I Zoi Mou Oli"
3. "Istoria Mou"
4. "Siko Horepse Koukli Mou"
5. "Ti' Thela Kai S' Agapousa"
6. "Mavro Mou Helidoni, Ta Lianohortaroudia, Mavri Thalassa"
7. "Horepsete"
8. "I Trata Mas I Kourelou"
9. "Tzivaeri"
10. "Mes Tou Aigaiou Ta Nera"
11. "Milo Mou Kai Mantarini"
12. "Stis Pikrodafnis Ton Antho, O Giatros"
13. "Amarantos"
14. "Parapono"
15. "Tis Kseniteias"
16. "Den Tha Ksanagapiso"
17. "Tis Gynaikas I Kardia"
