= Disincanto (Mango album) =

Studio album by Mango
- Released: 9 July 2002
- Genre: Pop rock
- Label: WEA
- Producer: Rocco Petruzzi, Mango

Mango chronology
Visto così (1999)	Disincanto (2002)	Ti porto in Africa (2004)

Disincanto is the twelfth studio album by Italian singer Mango. It features the singles "Disincanto" and "La rondine", and a cover of the Beatles' song "Michelle".

The album has sold 250,000 copies.

== Track listing ==
No.	Title	Writer(s)	Length
1.	"Disincanto"	Mango	3:45
2.	"Io sono sentimentale"	Mango, P. Panella	4:09
3.	"La rondine"	Mango, P. Panella	4:27
4.	"Un amore non torna"	Mango, A. Mango	4:28
5.	"Non è amore da ridere"	Mango	4:01
6.	"Fiore del mondo"	Mango, A. Salerno	3:27
7.	"Michelle"	J. Lennon, P. McCartney	2:35
8.	"E mi basta il mare"	Mango	3:56
9.	"Mi piaci accanto"	Mango, A. Mango	3:54
10.	"Non moriremo mai"	Mango	4:00
11.	"Ho consumato la notte"	Mango, A. Mango	4:11
12.	"E mi consumo"	Mango, A. Mango	3:53
13.	"Gli angeli non volano"	Mango	3:39

== Peak positions ==
Chart (2002)	Peak position
Italy (FIMI)	3
Swiss Albums Chart	64

== Personnel ==
- Mango – lead vocals, keyboards
- Graziano Accinni – guitars
- Gigi de Rienzo – guitars
- Rocco Petruzzi – keyboards
- Giancarlo Ippolito – drums
- Pasquale Laino – duduk on "Disincanto"
- Gilda Buttà – piano on "Gli angeli non volano"
- Luca Pincini – cello on "Gli angeli non volano"
