= Bella d'estate =

Single by Mango

from the album Adesso
- B-side: "Stella del nord"
- Released: 1987
- Genre: Pop
- Label: Ariola
- Songwriters: Mango and Lucio Dalla

Mango singles chronology
| "Dal cuore in poi" (1987) | "Bella d'estate" (1987) | "Tu... sì" (1990) |

Audio
- "Bella d'estate" on YouTube

"Bella d'estate" (Italian pronunciation: [ˈbɛlla deˈstaːte]; "Summer Beauty") is an Italian song composed by Mango and Lucio Dalla and performed by Mango. It is included in the 1987 album Adesso. The single was Mango's major hit, selling over 350,000 copies.

The song was also recorded by Mango in Spanish with the title "Flor de verano", included in the Spanish version of the album titled Ahora.

In 2008 the a cappella group Neri per Caso released a cover version, featuring Mango himself, as their second single from the album Angoli Diversi. In August 2020 Mika released a version of the song featuring Michele Bravi. The same year Tiziano Ferro included a cover of the song in the album Accetto miracoli: l'esperienza degli altri; a videoclip was released in August 2021.

== Track listing ==
- 7" single – Ariola 109 454
1. "Bella d'estate" (Mango - Lucio Dalla) - 6:38
2. "Stella del nord" (Mango - Alberto Salerno) - 6:00

== Charts ==
| Chart (1987) | Peak position |
|---|---|
| Italy (Hit Parade) | 3 |
| Italy Airplay (Music & Media) | 13 |
| Spain (PROMUSICAE) | 5 |
| Switzerland (Schweizer Hitparade) | 24 |

== Certifications ==
| Region | Certification | Certified units/sales |
|---|---|---|
| Italy (FIMI) certification for digital sales and streaming since January 2009 | Gold | 50,000^{‡} |
^{‡} Sales+streaming figures based on certification alone.
