= Zontana Stous Vrahous =

EP by Eleftheria Arvanitaki
- Released: (Greece) 1995
- Genre: Laïko
- Label: PolyGram/Polydor

Kostas Martakis chronology
Zontana Stous Vrahous (1995)	Tragoudia Gia Tous Mines: The Third Side (2000)

Zontana Stous Vrahous is a live EP by Greek singer Eleftheria Arvanitaki that was released in 1995. It was recorded live at the Vrahon Theatre. It sold over 30,000 copies in Greece, and became the first CD single to be certified Platinum in the country. (Note: up to 2008, EPs charted on the Top 50 Singles of IFPI Greece).

== Track listing ==
1. Instrumental – Oud Improvisation, Tamzara (Armenian), Traditional Thracian Dance
2. "Meno Ektos"
3. "Dinata"
