= Laura Valente =

Italian singer (born 1963)

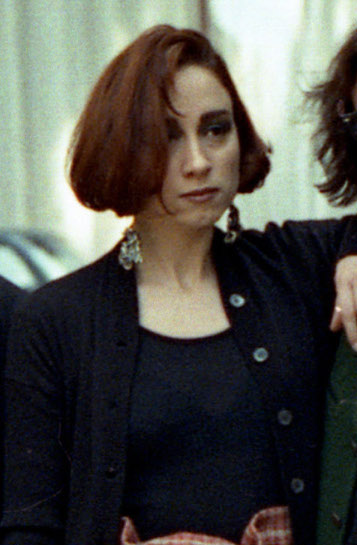
- Valente in 1993

Background information
- Also known as: LaValente
- Born: Laura Bortolotti; 3 September 1963 (age 62); Milan, Italy
- Genres: Pop rock
- Occupation(s): Singer, songwriter
- Instrument(s): Vocals, guitar
- Years active: 1984–present

Laura Bortolotti (born 3 September 1963), better known by the stage name Laura Valente, is an Italian singer.

== Career ==
=== Early solo career ===
Valente was born in Milan. After winning a songwriting contest in Castellana Grotte with Storia di un drogato, a song about a teenage victim of drug addiction, she was invited by Gianni Bella to collaborate on his album G.B. 2 (1984). In 1985 she met singer Mango, with whom she started a personal and professional relationship. Valente provide vocals for Mango's albums Australia (1985), Odissea (1986), Inseguendo l'aquila (1988) and Sirtaki (1990). In 1986 Valente recorded her debut solo album Tempo di Blues (1986). Despite being very positively received by the music press, the album didn't sell well.

=== Matia Bazar ===
In 1990 Valente was invited to replace Antonella Ruggiero as the lead singer of Matia Bazar. Valente's first album with the band, Anime Pigre (1991), signalled a creative change of direction, focusing on a more modern, rocking style.

Matia Bazar's participations in the Sanremo Music Festival in 1992 (with Piccoli Giganti, ranked #6) and 1993 (with Dedicato a te, ranked #4) were also a critical and commercial success, as well as their next albums Dove le canzoni si avverano (1993), Radiomatia (1995) and Benvenuti a Sausalito (1997).

After the death of Matia Bazar's bassist and main songwriter Aldo Stellita in 1998, however, Valente decided to leave the group to focus on her family.

=== Later solo career ===
During the 2000s, Valente mainly collaborated with Mango, notably duetting with him on his song Chissà se nevica during the third night of Sanremo Music Festival 2007. She has also been active in theatre. In 2011 she played Maria Callas in a production called Castaviva in Rome.

== Personal life ==
Valente was the partner of musician Mango since 1983. They were married from 2004 to his death in 2014. Their children Filippo (b. 1995) and Angelina (b. 2001) are also in the music business and have collaborated with their parents on several occasions.

== Discography ==
=== Solo ===
- Tempo di Blues (1986)

=== With Matia Bazar ===
- Anime pigre (1991)
- Dove le canzoni si avverano (1993)
- Radiomatia (1995)
- Benvenuti a Sausalito (1997)
