= Min Orkizesai =

Single by Eleftheria Arvanitaki

from the album Dinata 1986-2007
- Released: 2007
- Genre: Pop
- Length: 4:48 (Album Version); 3:46 (Radio Edit); 4:53 (Mobile Version); 4:24 (Tango Mix by Soumka)
- Label: Universal/Mercury
- Songwriters: Mango, Mogol Nikos Moraitis

Eleftheria Arvanitaki singles chronology
"Tria Tragoudia" (2004)	"Min Orkizesai" (2007)

"Min Orkizesai" (Greek: "Μην Ορκίζεσαι"; English: "Don't take an oath") is a pop song performed by Greek singer/songwriter Eleftheria Arvanitaki with lyrics by Nikos Moraitis. The song was produced for Arvanitaki's greatest hits compilation Dinata 1986-2007 and was released as the album's first single. "Min Orkizesai" is a cover version of "Come Mona Lisa" by the Italian singer Mango, from the album Sirtaki (1990).

== Formats and track listings ==
Digital Download

1. "Min Orkizesai" (Come Mona Lisa) [Mobile Version] – 4:53

Digital Download 2

1. "Min Orkizesai" (Come Mona Lisa) [Tango Mix by Soumka] – 4:24

Promotional Only CD Single

1. "Min Orkizesai" (Come Mona Lisa) [Radio Edit] – 3:46
2. "Min Orkizesai" (Come Mona Lisa) [Album Version] – 4:48
