= Fidanzati =

Fidanzati (Italian: fiancés) may refer to:

== People ==
- Gaetano Fidanzati, a Sicilian Mafia boss

== Arts and entertainment ==
- I fidanzati, English title The Fiances, a 1963 Italian film
- I fidanzati della morte, English title Engaged to Death, a 1957 Italian film
- Fidanzati, a music album by Mauro Nardi
