= Kai Ta Matia Kai I Kardia =

Studio album by Eleftheria Arvanitaki
- Released: 28 November 2008
- Genre: Laïka, Folk
- Label: Universal Music Greece

Eleftheria Arvanitaki chronology
Grigora I Ora Perase (2006)	Kai Ta Matia Kai I Kardia (2008)

Kai Ta Matia Kai I Kardia (Greek: Και τα μάτια κι η καρδιά; English: And the eyes and the heart) is an album by popular Greek artist Eleftheria Arvanitaki released in 2008. It is her thirteenth studio album.

A Spanish edition of the album titled Mirame (Spanish: Mirame; English: Look) was released in Spain in 2009 by Universal Music Spain, accompanied by performances by Arvanitaki throughout the country. The album was also released in the UK by independent label Wrasse Records, who in turn also released the album in the United States and Canada.

== Track listing ==
=== Original edition ===
1. "To Gkrizo Ton Mation Sou"
2. "Toso Megala Logia"
3. "Ton Erota Rotao"
4. "Sto Palati Tis Kardias Sou"
5. "Pes Mou"
6. "De Milo Gia Mia Nihta Ego (Bukovina)"
7. "Toso Megala Logia"
8. "Ase Me Na Se Misiso"
9. "Kseni Kardia"
10. "Ta Mistika Tou Kosmou"
11. "Mia Efhi"
12. "Mirame"
13. "Pes Mou (Soumka Mix)"
14. "De Milo Gia Mia Nihta Ego (Soumka Mix)"

=== International edition ===
1. "To Grinza Ton Mation Sou"
2. "To Telos Mas Des"
3. "Ton Erota Rotao"
4. "Sto Palati Tis Kardias Sou"
5. "Pes Mou"
6. "De Milo Gia Mia Nichta Ego"
7. "Toso Megala Logia"
8. "Ase Me Na Se Misiso"
9. "Xeni Kardia"
10. "Ta Mystika Tou Kosmou"
11. "Mia Efhi"
12. "Mirame"
