= Come l'acqua =

Studio album by Mango
- Released: 1992
- Genre: Pop
- Label: Fonit Cetra
- Producer: Armando Mango, Mogol

Mango chronology
Sirtaki (1990)	Come l'acqua (1992)	Mango (1994)

Come l'acqua is the ninth studio album by Italian pop singer Mango, released in 1992.

The album contains "Mediterraneo", one of the most successful singles by Mango.

The string sections were recorded at the Abbey Road Studios in London.

== Track listing ==
No.	Title	Writer(s)	Length
1.	"Mediterraneo"	Mango, Mogol	3:55
2.	"Una vita da scordare"	Mango, Mogol	4:28
3.	"Come l'acqua"	Mango, Mogol	5:03
4.	"Uocchie 'e 'stu munno"	A. Mango, Mango	5:26
5.	"Passeggera unica"	Mango, A. Mango	4:37
6.	"Grandi sogni"	Mango, Mogol	4:21
7.	"Mondi sommersi"	Mango, Mogol	4:35
8.	"Le onde s'infrangono"	Mango, Mogol	4:36
9.	"Intime distanze"	A. Mango, Mango	5:25
10.	"Il condor"	A. Mango, Mango	4:42

== Charts ==
Chart	Peak position
Italy (Musica e dischi)	5

== Personnel ==
- Mango: vocals, choir
- Celso Valli: keyboards, synth bass
- Pino Palladino: bass
- Ian Kewley: keyboards
- Lele Melotti: drums
- Paolo Costa: bass
- Graziano Accinni: guitar
- Beppe Gemelli: drums
- Mauro Paoluzzi: guitar
- Rocco Petruzzi: keyboards
- Manu Katché: drums
- Dominic Miller: guitar
- Richard Galliano: accordion
- Paolo Bighignoli: oboe
- Paolo Grazia: bassoon
- Silvia Valente, Giorgio Vanni: choir
