= Biolcati =

Biolcati is an Italian surname from Emilia and Rovigo, possibly derived from the biolca, a local agricultural unit of measurement, and thus indicating a landowner. Notable people with the name include:

- Lena Biolcati (born 1960), Italian singer
- Massimo Biolcati (born 1972), Swedish-Italian-American bassist
- Maria Ilva Biolcati (1939–2021), known as Milva, Italian singer and actress
