= La rondine (song) =

Single by Mango

from the album Disincanto
- B-side: "Michelle"
- Released: 2002
- Genre: Alternative rock, pop rock
- Length: 4:26
- Label: WEA
- Songwriters: Mango and Pasquale Panella
- Producer: Alberto Salerno

Mango singles chronology
"Luce" (1998)	"La rondine" (2002)	"Ti porto in Africa" (2004)

Music video
- "La rondine" on YouTube

"La rondine" (transl. "The swallow") is an Italian song composed by Mango (music) and Pasquale Panella (lyrics) and performed by Mango. It is included in the 2002 album Disincanto. It was one of the biggest Italian hits of summer 2002.

In 2024 the song re-entered the Italian hit parade following the cover version performed by his daughter Angelina at the 74th edition of the Sanremo Music Festival.

The single release features an a cappella version of "Michelle" by The Beatles and "Nero e blu", an early composition by Mango from the album È pericoloso sporgersi (1982), co-written with his brother Armando Mango.

== Track listing ==
No.	Title	Writer(s)	Length
1.	"La rondine"	Pino Mango, Pasquale Panella	4:26
2.	"Michelle"	John Lennon, Paul McCartney	2:36
3.	"Nero e blu"	Pino Mango, Armando Mango	3:19

== Charts ==
Weekly chart performance for "La rondine"
Chart (2002)	Peak position
Italy (FIMI)	5

Chart (2024)	Peak position
Italy (FIMI)	26

== Certifications ==
Region	Certification	Certified units/sales
Italy (FIMI) Only sales from 2009	Platinum	100,000^{‡}
^{‡} Sales+streaming figures based on certification alone.
