= Stis Akres Ap' Ta Matia Sou =

Greatest hits album by Eleftheria Arvanitaki
- Released: 2006
- Genre: Laika
- Label: EmArcy

Eleftheria Arvanitaki chronology
Dromoi Paralliloi (2005)	Stis Akres Ap' Ta Matia Sou (2006)	Grigora I Ora Perase (2006)

Stis Akres Ap' Ta Matia Sou (To The Edges of Your Eyes) is an international album by popular Greek artist Eleftheria Arvanitaki released in 2006 through her Verve Records contract under the EmArcy label. The album consists of 14 selected songs from her local 2005 compilation release, Dromoi Paralliloi, that reflect the wide interpretative qualities of Eleftheria with traditional and western rhythms.

== Track listing ==
1. "Stis Akres Ap' Ta Matia Sou"
2. "Ena Ohi"
3. "Ti Leipei"
4. "Stin Arhi Tou Tragoudiou"
5. "Me Tin Plati"
6. "Thelo Na Se Do"
7. "Mi Fevgeis"
8. "Ki Ola Arhizoun Allios"
9. "Trele Tsingane"
10. "Afto To Vrady"
11. "Erotiko"
12. "Adeia Mou Agkalia"
13. "Kryvomai Sto Antio"
14. "Kapou Iparhi I Agapi Mou"
