= Ola Sto Fos =

Studio album by Eleftheria Arvanitaki
- Released: 2004
- Genre: Laika
- Label: Universal Music Greece, Mercury

Eleftheria Arvanitaki chronology
Eleftheria Arvanitaki - Live (2003)	Ola Sto Fos (2004)	Dromoi Paralliloi (2005)

Ola Sto Fos (Everything Brought to Light) is an album by popular Greek artist Eleftheria Arvanitaki that was released in 2004.
The whole album was arranged by Akis Katsoupakis, giving a new sound to Arvanitaki's more traditional style.
Eleftheria Arvanitaki's come back with an album signed by the greatest composers of the modern Greek scene: Mihalis Hatzigiannis, Dimitra Galani, Antonis Vardis, Mahairitsas, Alkinoos Ioannidis, and more. There is a bonus DVD with pictures from the recording studio where Eleftheria talks with the authors of her songs, interprets the lyrics from her new songs, and answers questions posed in an interview with Giorgos Haronitis. It sold over 40,000 copies in Greece and was certified Platinum. It is also made available in many other markets through her contract with Verve Records.

== Track listing ==
1. "Pare Me Agkalia Kai Pame"
2. "Den Ehei Epistrofi"
3. "Episkeptes"
4. "Ksimeronei"
5. "Mes Ti Diki Sou Ti Zoi"
6. "Os Ta Haramata"
7. "O Erotas Den Menei Pia Edo"
8. "Ola Sto Fos"
9. "Pao Na Piaso Ourano"
10. "Pes Mou Oneira Glyka"
11. "Ti Mou Dineis Na Gyriso"
12. "Ena Tragoudi Gia Tin Eleftheria"
13. "San Aeraki"
