= Ta Kormia Kai Ta Macheria =

Studio album by Eleftheria Arvanitaki
- Released: 1994
- Genre: Laika
- Label: PolyGram Greece, Polydor

Eleftheria Arvanitaki chronology
I Nihta Katavainei (1993)	Ta Kormia Kai Ta Macheria (1994)	Megales Epityhies (1995)

Ta Kormia Kai Ta Macheria (Τα Κορμιά Και Τα Μαχαίρια; "The Bodies and The Knives") is an album by popular Greek artist Eleftheria Arvanitaki. It was released in 1994 and is her sixth personal album. The album was written by Ara Dinkjian, with lyrics by Lina Nikolakopoulou and poet Michalis Ganas; orchestration was by Dimitris Papadimitriou.

== Track listing ==
1. "Fysa Psychi Mou" (Φύσα Ψυχή Μου)
2. "Skies Kai Chromata" (Σκιές Και Χρώματα)
3. "Ta Kormia Kai Ta Macheria" (Τα Κορμιά Και Τα Μαχαίρια)
4. "San Vrochi" (Σαν Βροχή)
5. "Mavro Kyparisi" (Μαύρο Κυπαρίσσι)
6. "Ta Polla Na Gynoun Ola" (Τα Πολλά Να Γίνουν Όλα)
7. "I Varka" (Η Βάρκα)
8. "Ta Schinia" (Τα Σχοινιά)
9. "Ego Krasi Den Epina" (Εγώ Κρασί Δεν Έπινα)
10. "I Kardia Mou Apopse Xagrypna" (Η Καρδιά Μου Απόψε Ξαγρυπνά)
11. "Gelasti Fotografia" (Γελαστή Φωτογραφία)
12. "Parapono, I Xenitia" (Παράπονο, Η Ξενιτιά)
