= Kontrabanto =

Studio album by Eleftheria Arvanitaki
- Released: 1986
- Genre: Laika
- Label: Lyra

Eleftheria Arvanitaki chronology
Eleftheria Arvanitaki (1984)	Kontrabanto (1986)	Tanirama (1989)

Kontrabanto (Contraband) is the second album by Greek artist Eleftheria Arvanitaki, released in 1986. Kontrabando is considered a "landmark" album in Greek discography, as Arvanitaki's peculiar and highly distinctive voice among the western instruments that were used, managed to combine tradition with novelty. It sold over 150,000 copies in Greece and was certified Platinum.

== Track listing ==
1. "I Akti"
2. "I Stigmi"
3. "Paramidi"
4. "Mi Milas"
5. "Plai Moni"
6. "Oti Mou Leipei"
7. "Efiges Noris"
8. "Toso Erotevmeni"
9. "Kontrabanto"
10. "Mia Foni"
