= Dromi Parallili =

Dromoi Paralliloi

Greatest hits album by Eleftheria Arvanitaki
- Released: 2005
- Genre: Laika
- Labels: Universal Music Greece, Mercury

Eleftheria Arvanitaki chronology
Ola Sto Fos (2004)	Dromoi Paralliloi (2005)	Stis Akres Ap' Ta Matia Sou (2006)

Dromoi Paralliloi (Parallel Roads) is an album by popular Greek artist Eleftheria Arvanitaki and it was released in 2005. Two-CD set anthologising some of Eleftheria's guest appearances on other artists' albums, as well as three previously unreleased live recordings and two new songs. It sold over 20,000 copies in Greece and was certified Gold.

== Track listing ==
=== Disc 1 ===
1. "Stis Akres Ap' Ta Matia Sou"
2. "Ena Ohi"
3. "Ti Leipei"
4. "Stin Arhi Tou Tragoudiou"
5. "Anastasia"
6. "Erotiko"
7. "Se Thelo"
8. "Me Tin Plati"
9. "Meine Konta Mou"
10. "Mi Fevgeis"
11. "Ah Na' Mouna"
12. "Neilos"
13. "Ikaria"
14. "Trele Tsiggane"
15. "Tsigaro Ego Sto Stoma Mou Den Evala Oute Ena"
16. "Sta Roda Tis Avlis Mou"
17. "Na 'He I Nihta Akri"
18. "Anathema Se"
19. "Adeia Mou Agkalia"
20. "I Sklava"

=== Disc 2 ===
1. "Ki Ola Arhizoun Allios"
2. "Thelo Na Se Do"
3. "Telos" (Ola Arhizoun Edo)
4. "Fovamai"
5. "Sodade"
6. "Ta Lianotragouda"
7. "Zografies"
8. "Se Esperino Tou Notou"
9. "Akrotirion Tainaron"
10. "Eho Ksehasei T' Onoma Mou"
11. "To Miden"
12. "Pyrkayia Me Pyrkayia"
13. "To Kokkino Foustani"
14. "Afto To Vrady"
15. "Ohi Mazi"
16. "Agapoula Kryfi"
17. "Kryfto"
18. "Chartino To Feggaraki Ki Apospasmata"
19. "Kryvomai Sto Adio"
20. "Kapou Iparhi I Agapi Mou"
