= Tria Tragoudia =

EP by Eleftheria Arvanitaki
- Released: (Greece) 2004
- Genre: Laïko
- Label: Universal/Mercury

Eleftheria Arvanitaki chronology
Tragoudia Gia Tous Mines (2000)	Tria Tragoudia (2004)

"Tria Tragoudia" (Three Songs) is the third EP by Greek artist Eleftheria Arvanitaki that was released in 2004. It was certified Gold by the IFPI.

== Track listing ==
1. "Pao Na Piaso Ourano"
2. "Oi Filoi Mou De S' Agapoun"
3. "Telos Den Iparhi Edo"
