= Accetto miracoli =

2019 Tiziano Ferro album

Accetto miracoli Acepto milagros

Studio album by Tiziano Ferro
- Released: 22 November 2019
- Studio: Los Angeles (Westlake Recording Studios, Paramount Recording Studio), Miami (Hit Factory Criteria), Milan (Pinaxa Studio)
- Genre: Pop; R&B
- Length: 43:19
- Language: Italian, Spanish
- Label: Universal; Virgin
- Producer: Tiziano Ferro; Timbaland; Angel Lopez; Federico Vindver; Davide Tagliapietra; Julio Reyes Copello

Tiziano Ferro chronology
Il mestiere della vita (2016)	Accetto miracoli Acepto milagros (2019)	Accetto miracoli: l'esperienza degli altri (2020)

Singles from Accetto miracoli
- 1. "Buona (cattiva) sorte" Released: 31 May 2019; 2. "Accetto miracoli" Released: 20 September 2019; 3. "In mezzo a questo inverno" Released: 29 Novembre 2019; 4. "Amici per errore" Released: 14 February 2020; 5. "Balla per me" Released: 5 June 2020; 6. "Casa a Natale" Released: 11 December 2020

Accetto miracoli ("I Accept Miracles") is the seventh studio album by Italian singer-songwriter Tiziano Ferro, released on 22 November 2019 through Virgin Records and Universal Music Italy.

The Spanish version of the album is titled Acepto milagros was published on 29 November 2019.

== Composition ==
The album was produced by Tiziano Ferro himself with Timbaland, Angel López, Federico Vindver, Davide Tagliapietra and Julio Reyes Copello, with writing contribution by Giordana Angi. In an interview with Vogue Italia, Ferro explained the meaning of the album and his decision to collaborate with Timbaland:

Sometimes we have to surrender to our fate, without forcing the trend. It is in that instant that miracles happen and things turn out better than we expected. Accetto miracoli for me represents a new beginning, a change I felt the need for, yet without having planned it. After all, everything compared to 2016 has changed. I found myself living in a different place, California, which I did not love but learned to discover. I did not expect to embark, then, on a relationship that would lead to a marriage with Victor Allen, but now my family is there, with all the needs and choices that this can entail. I needed to get out of a certain comfort zone, also find renewed creativity. Meeting a music guru like Timbaland, who has always been my idol and who became the producer of the new album, forced me to put myself out there as a student again. This record is the result of a micro-crisis that turned into a creative crisis.

== Promotion ==
Ferro announced the album on social media on 9 December 2018, and later announced that it would be published in November 2019.

Ferro released the singles "Buona (cattiva) sorte" on 31 May 2019, and "Accetto miracoli" on 20 September 2019. The album itself was released on 22 November 2019. The third single, "In mezzo a questo inverno", was released on 29 November 2019, followed by "Amici per errore" on 14 February 2020, and "Balla per me" with Jovanotti on 5 June 2020.

On 6 November 2020, the album was rereleased as the second disc of Ferro's cover album, Accetto miracoli: l'esperienza degli altri.

== Track listing ==
Accetto miracoli
No.	Title	Writer(s)	Producer(s)	Length
1.	"Vai ad amarti"	Tiziano Ferro	Timbaland; Angel López; Federico Vindver	4:07
2.	"Amici per errore"	Ferro; Massimiliano Pelan; Francesco Gramegna	Ferro; Sonzini	2:53
3.	"Balla per me" (featuring Jovanotti)	Ferro	Timbaland; López; Vindver	3:25
4.	"In mezzo a questo inverno"	Ferro; Fabio De Martino; Francesco Gramegna	Ferro	3:45
5.	"Come farebbe un uomo"	Ferro; Emanuele Dabbono	Timbaland; López; Vindver	3:30
6.	"Seconda pelle"	Ferro; Giordana Angi	Timbaland; López; Vindver	3:35
7.	"Il destino di chi visse per amare"	Ferro; Sergio Ciccarelli	Timbaland; López; Vindver	4:10
8.	"Le 3 parole sono 2"	Ferro	Timbaland; López; Vindver	3:50
9.	"Casa a Natale" (featuring Caparezza)	Ferro; Angi	Davide Tagliapietra	4:06
10.	"Un uomo pop"	Ferro	Ferro	3:13
11.	"Buona (cattiva) sorte"	Ferro; Angi; Dabbono	Timbaland; López; Vindver	3:14
12.	"Accetto miracoli"	Ferro; Angi; Antonio Iammarino	Timbaland; López; Vindver	3:21
Total length:				43:19

Bonus tracks in the digital edition

No.	Title	Lyrics	Music	Length
13.	"In mezzo a questo inverno" (Reyes Cut)	Tiziano Ferro, Fabio De Martino, Francesco Gramegna	Tiziano Ferro, Massimiliano Pelan, Fabio De Martino	3:24
14.	"Accetto miracoli" (Reyes Cut)	Tiziano Ferro	Giordana Angi, Antonio Iammarino	3:05

== Charts ==
=== Weekly charts ===
Chart performance for Accetto miracoli
Chart (2019)	Peak position
Belgian Albums (Ultratop Wallonia)	62
Italian Albums (FIMI)	1
Spanish Albums (PROMUSICAE) Spanish version	11
Swiss Albums (Schweizer Hitparade)	7

=== Year-end charts ===
Accetto miracoli

Chart (2019)	Position
Italian Albums (FIMI)	9

== Certifications ==
Region	Certification	Certified units/sales
Italy (FIMI)	3× Platinum	150,000^{‡}
^{‡} Sales+streaming figures based on certification alone.
