= Live apo to Gyalino Mousiko Theatro =

Eleftheria Arvanitaki - Live

Live album by Eleftheria Arvanitaki
- Released: 2002
- Recorded: Gyalino Music Theater, 2001
- Genre: Laika
- Label: Universal Music Greece, Mercury

Eleftheria Arvanitaki chronology
Ekpobi (2001)	Eleftheria Arvanitaki - Live (2002)	Eleftheria Arvanitaki - Live (2003)

Eleftheria Arvanitaki Live is an international compilation album by Greek artist Eleftheria Arvanitaki of live recordings that was released in 2003 under the EmArcy label through Verve Records. In addition to the songs on the previous album, it includes two previously unreleased songs recorded at Vox music club in March 2003.

== Track listing ==
1. "Omorfi Mou Agapi"
2. "Telos" (Ola Arhizoun Edo)
3. "Na Me Thymasai"
4. "Tha Kleiso Ta Matia"
5. "Stalia Stalia"
6. "Thelo Konta Sou Na Meino"
7. "To Parapono"
8. "Parapono - I Ksenitia"
9. "Efyges Noris"
10. "Pes Mou Mia Lexi"
11. "To Miden"
