= Mauro Nardi =

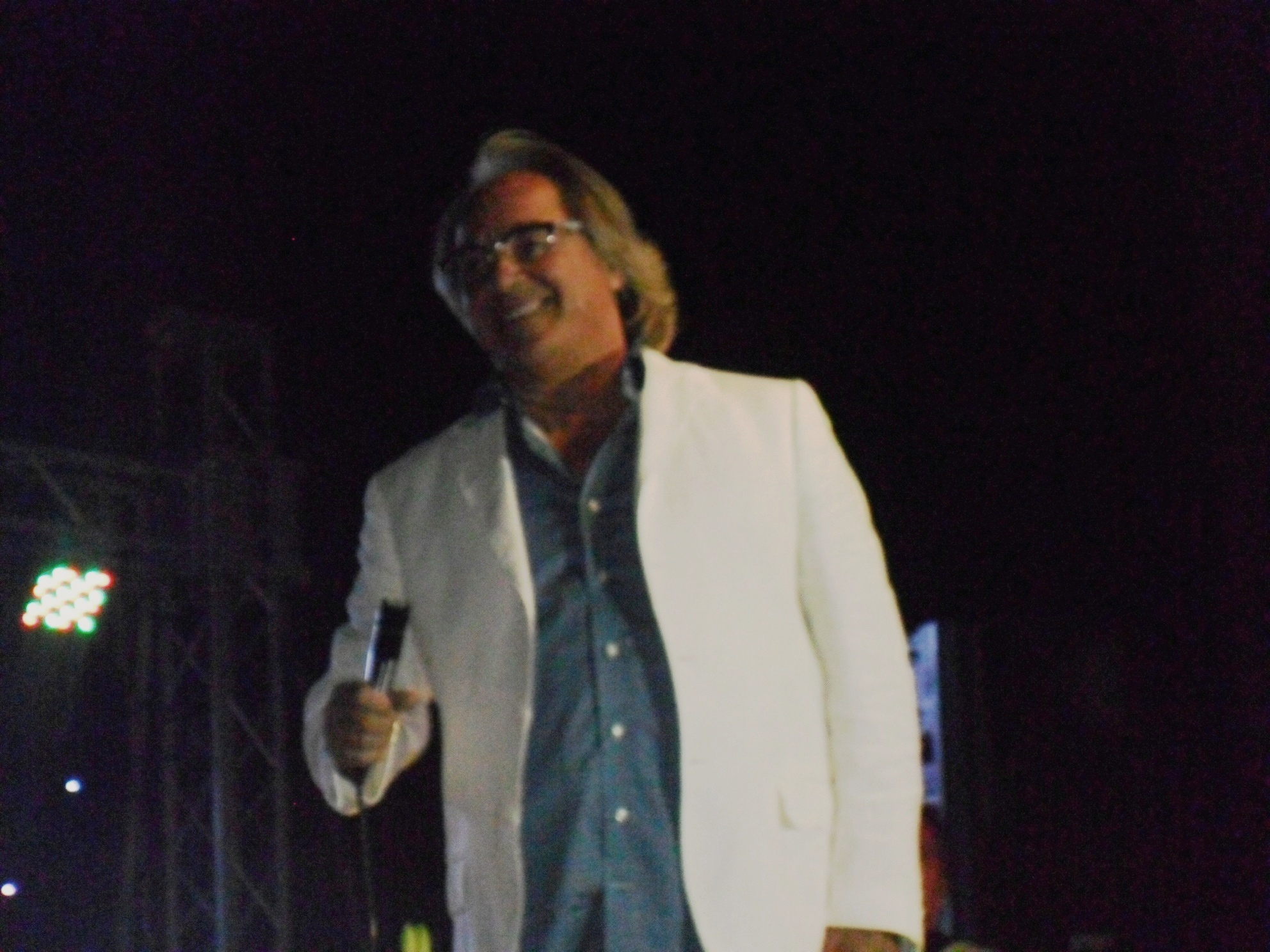

Background information
- Born: Antonio Borrelli; April 26, 1954 (age 72); Naples, Italy
- Origin: Naples, Italy
- Genres: Canzone napoletana; Pop music
- Occupation: Singer
- Years active: 1977–present
- Labels: Zeus Record; Seamusica; GS Record
- Website: http://www.mauronardi.it

Mauro Nardi, stage name of Antonio Borrelli (April 26, 1954), is an Italian singer.

== Biography ==
Born in Naples on April 26, 1954, Mauro Nardi began his career at age 19 as part of an RAI orchestra conducted by Gianni Desideri. Though not part of the televised program Senza Rete on Rai Uno, his early involvement was supported by the ATAF agency, led by Antonio Fusco and Franco Baldi. In 1981, Nardi gained wider recognition when he performed the song “Doce e amaro” at the Festival of Naples.

He became friends with Nino D'Angelo, who wrote two songs for him, the first and the second LPs Ricordi and Illusione. These contain other songs written by him on the issues of melodic song and Neapolitan love. This was in a period in which he went to fashion's song "jacket" given in vogue a decade before by the likes of Mario Merola, Pino Mauro, and Mario Trevi. From that moment, he turned the music generation with the birth of neomelodic artists such as Mauro Nardi, Nino D'Angelo, Gigi Finizio, Carmelo Zappulla, Franco Moreno, and Mauro Caputo. In later years, and still performs various tours in Italy and abroad, and sings at several street parties.

Mauro Nardi, also an interpreter of Neapolitan melodrama in theater, is the protagonist of the Third Elementary skit written by Alberto Sciotti, based on one of the biggest musical hits of the same name by Nardi. This skit, as well as Nardi, includes among its performers also: Fortuna Robustelli, Angelo Dei Visconti, Franco Calone, and Silvia Muccino.

For the first time in 1987, he participated in the program of Rai 1 Napoli prima e dopo, where he performed classic Neapolitan songs. Over the years, he also participated in other occasions, with the last occurring in 2005. In 2000 and 2001, he participated in the transmission Viva Napoli, led by Mike Bongiorno and Loretta Goggi on Rete 4. In 2006, he went on tour in the United States with Gigi D'Alessio.

On May 27, 2011, he took part, along with other colleagues, in the concert held in the Piazza del Plebiscito in Naples. This was in favor of the election of the candidate of the PDL, Gianni Lettieri, for mayor of the city. In April 2012, Nardi again performed with his band in Atlantic City, where he held three shows, including two with Francesco Merola.

== Recordings (selection) ==
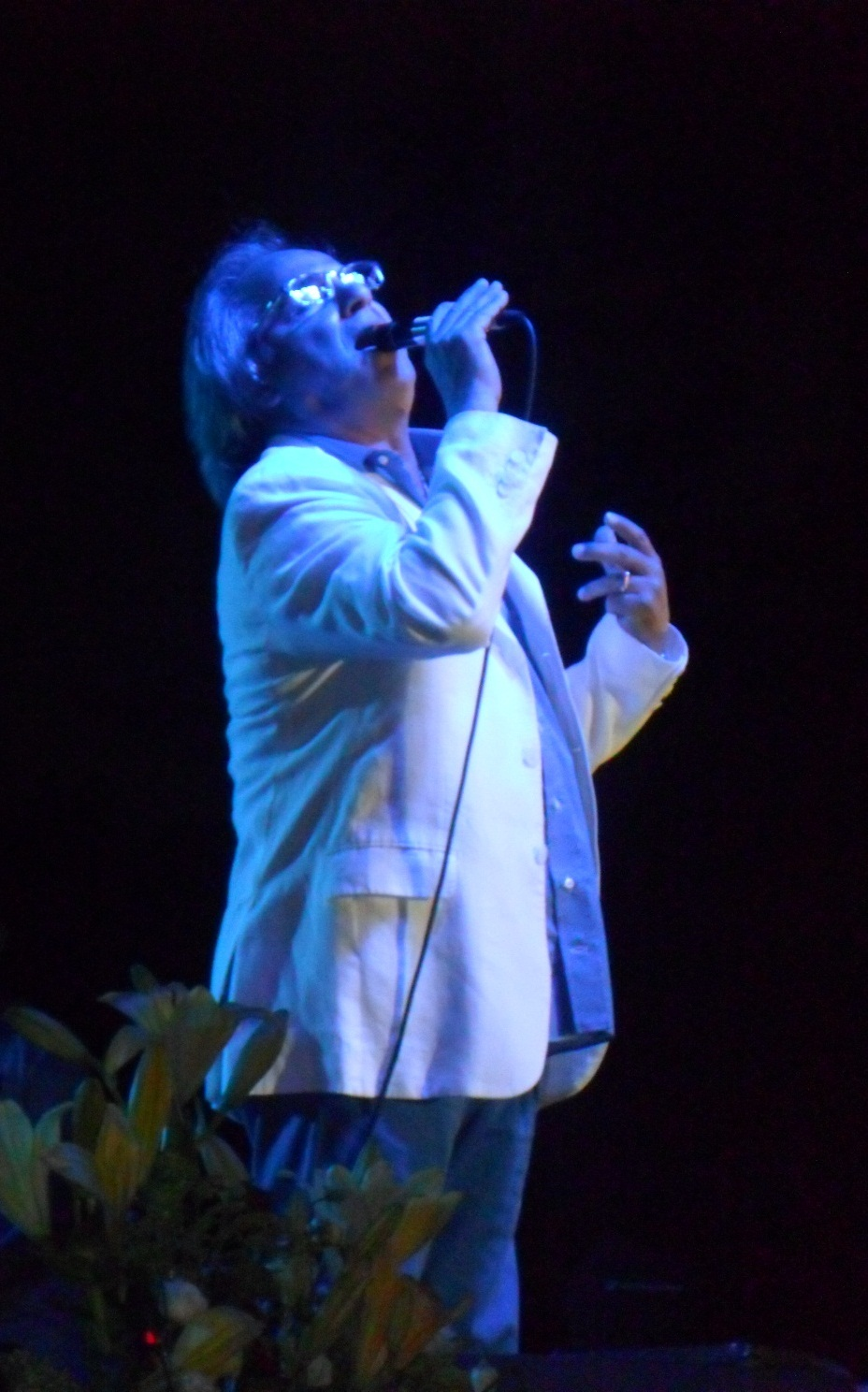
Mauro Nardi during a performance in Palermo on 2 August 2014

- 1979 – Napule 'e pulecenella
- 1980 – Ricordi
- 1981 – Tu nun saje fingere
- 1982 – Ragazzina
- 1983 – Fragola e margherite
- 1984 – Fidanzati
- 1985 – Fore 'a scola
- 1985 – ...Un'estate al mare
- 1986 – ...E arriva lui
- 1987 – Napulegno
- 1988 – Goccia di mare
- 1989 – Io ti avrò
- 1990 – 25 maggio 1990
- 1992 – Ho fatto tredici
- 1993 – Musica e poesia
- 1993 – Quando il cuore s'innamora
- 1994 – Storie vere
- 1994 – La magia di Napoli
- 1995 – Metropolis
- 1996 – Meravigliosamente
- 1997 – Fotografie
- 1999 – ...E fu subito Nardi
- 2000 – N'appuntamento
- 2001 – Mauro Nardi?
- 2004 – Neoclassica napoletana
- 2004 – Classicheggiando vol.1
- 2004 – Classicheggiando vol.2
- 2004 – Classicheggiando vol.3
- 2005 – Evergreen
- 2005 – Mauro Nardi canta Merola
- 2005 – Na fabbrica e buscie
- 2005 – 60x70
- 2006 – 'Nu pentito 'nnammurato
- 2007 – 'Vivere e murì
- 2008 – Amò amò
- 2010 – Oltre la vita
- 2013 – Cantammore
- 2015 – La mia balera
- 2017 – Amori
- 2020 – N'ammore a cinque stelle
