= Lena Biolcati =

Italian singer

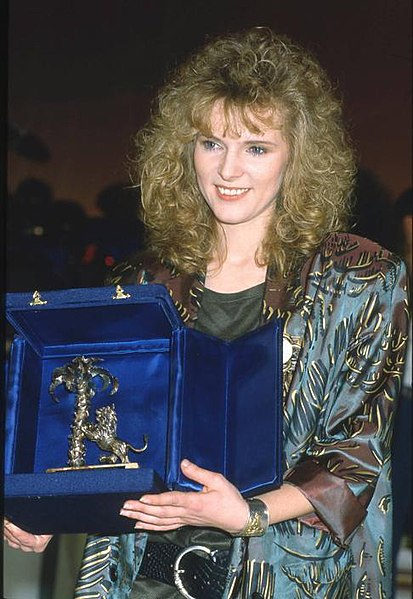
- Biolcati in 1986
- Born: 26 January 1960 (age 66); Galliate, Italy
- Occupation: Singer

Lena Biolcati (born 26 January 1960) is an Italian singer, mainly successful in the second half of the 1980s.

== Life and career ==
Born in Galliate, Novara, after some experiences as a chorist in 1984 Biolcati won the Castrocaro Music Festival, which got her the chance to compete at the 35th edition of the Sanremo Music Festival, where she placed third in the "Newcomers" section with the song "Innamoratevi come me". The same year, she also competed at the World Popular Song Festival in Tokyo, with the song "C’è ancora cielo". Produced by Pooh, in 1986 she won the Newcomers section of the Sanremo Festival with the song "Grande grande amore", and she came back to the Festival two more times, competing in the "Big Artists" section in 1987 and 1990.

After a period of silence, in 2000 Biolcati opened a singing school in Rome, and starting from 2002 she relaunched her career on stage, appearing in several musicals, notably in Saverio Marconi's Pinocchio.

== Discography ==
Album

- 1986 - Lena Biolcati (CGD, 20505)
- 1987 - Ballerina (CGD, 20625)
- 1989 - La luna nel cortile (Ricordi, SMRL 6404)
- 1990 - 1990 Giorni dopo (Ricordi, SMRL 6413)
