= Eleftheria Arvanitaki (album) =

Studio album by Eleftheria Arvanitaki
- Released: 1984
- Genre: Laika
- Label: Lyra

Eleftheria Arvanitaki chronology
Eleftheria Arvanitaki (1984)	Kontrabanto (1986)

Eleftheria Arvanitaki (Greek: Ελευθερία Αρβανιτάκη) is an album by popular Greek artist Eleftheria Arvanitaki released in 1984 in Greece by Lyra Records. It is her debut solo studio album. The albums was composed and written by folk and rembetika composers such as Vassilis Tsitsanis, Manolis Chiotis and Apostolos Kaldaras.

== Track listing ==
1. "Mes' Ti Hasapiki Agora"
2. "Arapiko Louloudi"
3. "Me Pire To Ximeroma Stous Dromous"
4. "Tha Spaso Koupes"
5. "To Koritsi Apopse Theli"
6. "De Me Povese Kanis"
7. "To Moro Mou"
8. "Nargile Mou Giati Svinis"
9. "Tsigaro Laiko"
10. "Chronia Tora Makria Sou Liono"
11. "Esi Ise I Etia Pou Ipofero"
12. "Miazis Ke Si San Thalassa"
