= Dinata 1986–2007 =

Dinata 1986-2007

Greatest hits album by Eleftheria Arvanitaki
- Released: December 2007 (Greece)
- Recorded: 1986–2007
- Label: Universal Music Greece, Mercury

Eleftheria Arvanitaki chronology
Grigora I Ora Perase (2006)	Dinata 1986-2007 (2007)

Dinata 1986–2007 is a two disc greatest hits collection by popular Greek artist Eleftheria Arvanitaki that was released in 2007 by Universal Music Greece. It includes Eleftheria's biggest hits from 1986 to 2007 and a new song, "Min orkizesai" (Don't take an oath), a Greek version from the song "Come Monna Lisa" by Mango (The Greek version became a big hit in early 2008). The album was certified platinum three weeks after its release.

== Track listing ==
=== Disc 1 ===
1. "Meno Ektos" (I still remain an outcast)
2. "Dinata" (Homecoming) live
3. "Tis Kalinihtas Ta Filia" (Good night kisses)
4. "Me To Idio Mako" (With the same blouse)
5. "Ta Kormia Kai Ta Maheria" (The bodies and the knives)
6. "Parapono" (Yar Ko Parag) - I Ksenitia (Bingeol)
7. "I Varka" (The Boat)
8. "Tha Spaso Koupes" (I' ll break cups)
9. "Zoi Klemmeni" (Stolen life)
10. "Tou Pothou T'agrimi" (Animal of passion)
11. "Pame Ksana Sta Thavmata" (Going again to the miracles)
12. "Fysa, Psihi Mou" (Blow, my soul)
13. "To Parapono" (The complaint)
14. "San Tin Agapi Tin Krifi" (Like the undercover love)

=== Disc 2 ===
1. "Min Orkizesai" (Come Monna Lisa) (Don't take an oath)
2. "Pare Kai Agalia Kai Pame" (Take me into your arms and let's go)
3. "Os Ta Haramata" (Till the dawn)
4. "Episkeptes" (Visitors)
5. "Kryvomai Sto Antio" (I'm hiding in goodbye)
6. "Pao Na Piaso Ourano" (I'm touching the sky)
7. "Hilies Vradies" (One thousand nights)
8. "Thelo Konta Sou Na Meino" (I want to stay by you)
9. "Kyma To Kyma" (Wave to wave)
10. "Istoria Palia" (La Femme Sans Haine (Old story)) (featuring Christos Thivaios)
11. "Efyges Noris" (You left early)
12. "I Akti" (The coast)
13. "An S'arnitho, Agapi Mou" (If I ever deject you, darling)
14. "Gia Ton Mation Sou To Hroma" (Only for the color of your eyes)

== Singles ==
"Min Orkizesai"

"Min Orkizesai", a remake of Mango's "Come Monna Lisa", was the first single released from the album. A music video for the song was also made.

== Charts ==
Chart	Provider	Peak position	Certification
Greek Albums Chart	IFPI	1	Platinum
