= Mango (singer) =

Italian singer-songwriter (1954–2014)

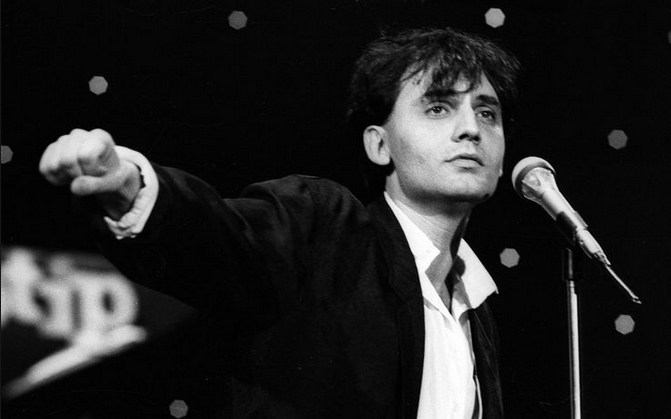
- Mango at the Sanremo Music Festival 1985

Background information
- Also known as: Pino Mango
- Born: Giuseppe Mango; 6 November 1954; Lagonegro, Italy
- Died: 8 December 2014 (aged 60) Policoro, Italy
- Genres: Pop rock, folk, world music
- Occupation: Singer-songwriter
- Instruments: Vocals, piano, keyboards, guitar
- Years active: 1976–2014

Giuseppe "Pino" Mango (6 November 1954 – 8 December 2014), better known mononymously as Mango, was an Italian singer-songwriter and musician. He was known for his style, which fuses pop, rock, folk, world music and for his extensive vocal range. He is best known for the song "Oro", from his 1986 breakout album release Odissea. Other hits include "Lei verrà", "Mediterraneo", "Bella d'estate", "Amore per te", "Come Monnalisa", "Nella mia città" and "La rondine".

Mango has been defined by Italian music author Mario Luzzatto Fegiz as an "authentic innovator of Italian pop music" and AllMusic considers him an "Italian rock fusion innovator". He wrote songs for Italian artists such as Patty Pravo, Loredana Bertè, Andrea Bocelli, Mietta. Part of his repertoire was performed by Italian and foreign musicians, including Mina, Mia Martini, Leo Sayer, Hélène Ségara and Eleftheria Arvanitaki.

== Biography ==
=== Beginning and early career ===
Mango was born in Lagonegro, province of Potenza. He grew up listening mainly to soul and hard rock music, his favourite musicians included Aretha Franklin, Led Zeppelin, Deep Purple and Peter Gabriel. He began his musical activity as a teen, playing in a cover band with his older brother Michele. Mango was not into Italian music at the time, stating he only performed some Lucio Battisti's songs. He started to study sociology at the University of Salerno, but he left after deciding to move to Rome, trying to enter the music business.

In 1976 Mango recorded his first album, La mia ragazza è un gran caldo. Two songs from the album, "Per te che mi apri l'universo" and "Tu pioggia io mattino", attracted the attention of Patty Pravo, who put them on her album Tanto (1976), though the title of the second song was changed to "Per amarti d'amore". Mia Martini also liked Mango's music and covered the song "Se mi sfiori" on the album Che vuoi che sia... se t'ho aspettato tanto (1976).

He released other records like Arlecchino (1979) and È pericoloso sporgersi (1982). His first three works did not receive attention from the media, pushing Mango to abandon his music career, but the meeting with lyricist Mogol changed his mind.

=== Breakthrough and success ===
His breakthrough came in 1985 with the album Australia, from which the single "Il viaggio" was performed by Mango at the Sanremo Music Festival of the same year. In 1986, he released Odissea, a turning point in his career containing some of his most famous songs, "Lei verrà" and "Oro". The album saw the collaboration of Brian Auger on the keyboards. 1987's Adesso includes the successful single "Bella d'estate", co-written with Lucio Dalla.

Other notable records are Sirtaki (1990), from which famous singles such as the title-track, "Nella mia città" and "Come Monna Lisa" were extracted, and Come l'acqua (1992), known for the song "Mediterraneo". The album featured the involvement of musicians like drummer Manu Katché and bassist Pino Palladino. Around this time, Mango also recorded three albums in Spanish: Ahora (1987), Hierro y Fuego (1988) and a Spanish version of Sirtaki (1991). On 30 April 1988 the single "Flor de Verano", Spanish version of "Bella d'estate" from Ahora, peaked at number No. 1 on the Spain's Los 40 Principales. Mango participated at the 1995 Sanremo Music Festival with the song "Dove vai", accompanied by world musician Ayub Ogada.

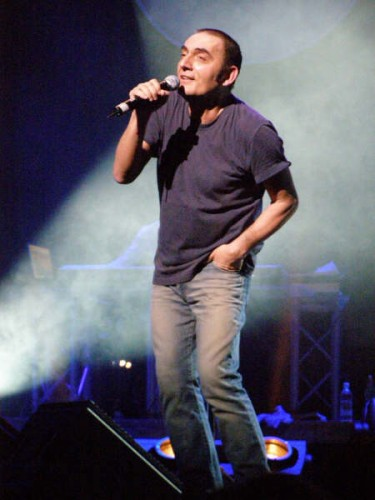
Mango, Acchiappanuvole Tour in Udine (2009)

Credo (1997) contains the single "Luce" which was performed by Mango along with Zenîma at the 1998 Sanremo Music Festival; an English version of the song called "Light" was included in the 1998 reissue. Peter Gabriel's guitarist David Rhodes and Simple Minds's drummer Mel Gaynor played on the record. The track "Amore per te", from the album Visto così (1999), was used as the Italian theme of the telenovela El Privilegio de Amar. Another successful album, Disincanto (2002), was supported by the singles "La rondine" and the title track. In 2004, he released Ti Porto in Africa, which went double platinum. His last work is La terra degli aquiloni, released in 2011. The album featured a Carlos Gardel cover of the song "Volver".

=== Death ===
On the evening of 7 December 2014, Mango suffered a heart attack during a concert in Policoro, province of Matera. While performing the song "Oro", he raised an arm and said "excuse me" in Italian to the crowd. He then raised his arm again and collapsed. Mango was taken off stage, and the rest of the concert was cancelled. He died before arriving at the hospital in the early hours of the following day. He was 60.

On 9 December, his older brother Giovanni felt sick during the wake and died at the hospital, aged 75. He is believed to have also died from a heart attack.

== Personal life ==
A very reserved person who rarely appeared in mass media, Mango was married to Laura Valente, known for her tenure as vocalist with the pop band Matia Bazar. From their marriage, two children were born: Filippo (b. 1995) and Angelina (b. 2001). They both collaborated with their father, Filippo, as a drummer, and Angelina as a singer.

== Songwriting ==
Mango wrote songs that were performed by other artists:

| Artist | Song | Year | Album |
|---|---|---|---|
| Mietta | Per esempio… per amore | 2003 | Per esempio... per amore |
| Mietta | Abbracciati e vivi | 2003 | Per esempio... per amore |
| Mietta | Fare l'amore | 2000 | Tutto o niente |
| Mietta | E no (Cosa sei) | 1991 | Volano le pagine |
| Mietta | Soli mai | 1991 | Volano le pagine |
| Mietta | Oltre te | 1991 | Volano le pagine |
| Mia Martini | Se mi sfiori | 1976 | Che vuoi che sia... se t'ho aspettato tanto |
| Patty Pravo | Per amarti d'amore | 1976 | Tanto |
| Patty Pravo | Per te che mi apri l'universo | 1976 | Tanto |
| Patty Pravo | Goodbye my love | 1986 | |
| Patty Pravo | Sentirti | 1978 | Miss Italia |
| Loretta Goggi | Io nascerò | 1986 | C'è poesia |
| Loretta Goggi | C'è poesia | 1986 | C'è poesia |
| Loredana Bertè | Re | 1986 | Fotografando... i miei successi |
| Loredana Bertè | Fotogrando | 1986 | Fotografando... i miei successi |
| Andrea Bocelli | L'attesa | 2004 | Andrea |
| Scialpi | L'Io e l'Es | 1983 | Es-tensioni |
| Scialpi | Hallelujah | 1983 | Es-tensioni |
| Andrea Mirò | Non è segreto (single) | 1988 | |
| Laura Valente | – | 1985 | Tempo di blues (LP) |
| Helena Hellwig | Di luna morirei | 2006 | Di luna morirei (CD Single) |
| Helena Hellwig | Geranio | 2006 | Di luna morirei (CD Single) |
| Dennis Fantina | Se non-con te | 2002 | Dennis |
| Dennis Fantina | Non è il cuore | 2002 | Dennis |
| Gloria Bonaveri | Joe | 1996 | Gloria |
| Anna Bussotti | Nessun dolore (single) | 1986 | |

== Cover ==
Some of his songs were rearranged by Italian and foreign artists, including:

| Artist | Song | Year | Album |
|---|---|---|---|
| Mia Martini | Se Mi Sfiori | 1976 | Che vuoi che sia... se t'ho aspettato tanto |
| Patty Pravo | Per Te Che Mi Apri L'Universo; Per amarti d'amore (Tu pioggia io mattino) | 1976 | Tanto |
| Patty Pravo | Sentirti | 1978 | Sentirti/Notti Bianche |
| Scialpi | Nero e blu | 1983 | Es-tensioni |
| Loretta Goggi | Lei verrà (featuring Mango) | 1986 | C'è poesia |
| Leo Sayer | The Moth and the Flame (Tu...si) | 1990 | Sanremo Music Festival |
| Mina | Oro | 1994 | Canarino mannaro |
| Hélène Ségara | Tu peux tout emporter (Amore per te) | 2000 | Au nom d'une femme |
| Mietta | Sentirti | 2003 | Per esempio... per amore |
| Eleftheria Arvanitaki | Min Orkizesai (Come Monna Lisa) | 2007 | Dinata 1986–2007 |
| Neri per caso | Bella d'estate (featuring Mango) | 2008 | Angoli diversi |
| Wender | Lei verrà (featuring Saretta) | 2010 | Alpacaaaa |
| Antonella Lo Coco | Disincanto | 2012 | Cuore scoppiato |
| Alessio Scarlata featuring Zenîma | Luce | 2015 | 1st Posthumous Tribute Single |

== Discography ==
=== Studio albums ===
- La mia ragazza è un gran caldo (1976)
- Arlecchino (1979)
- È pericoloso sporgersi (1982)
- Australia (1985)
- Odissea (1986)
- Adesso (1987)
- Inseguendo l’aquila (1988)
- Sirtaki (1990)
- Come l'acqua (1992)
- L'Oro Di Mango (1993)
- Mango (1994)
- Credo (1997)
- Disincanto (2002)
- Ti porto in Africa (2004)
- Ti amo così (2005)
- L’albero delle fate (2007)
- La terra degli aquiloni (2011)

=== Live albums ===
- Dove vai (1995)
- Gli amori son finestre (2009)

=== Compilations ===
- Visto così (1999)
- Tutto Mango: oro e platino (2006)

=== Albums recorded in Spanish ===
- Ahora (1987)
- Hierro y Fuego (1988)
- Sirtaki (1991)
