= Rimmel (song) =

1975 single by Francesco De Gregori

Single by Francesco De Gregori

from the album Rimmel
- Released: 1975
- Length: 3:41
- Label: RCA Italiana

Francesco De Gregori singles chronology
"Niente da capire" (1974)	"Rimmel" (1975)	"Bufalo Bill" (1976)

Audio
- "Rimmel" on YouTube

"Rimmel" is a song by Italian singer Francesco De Gregori, released in 1975.

== Composition ==
De Gregori composed the song in the summer of 1974 in Milan, while he was staying in a hotel and waiting to take part in a RAI TV-show.

A reflection about a lost love told through metaphors and puns, it is said to have been inspired by De Gregori's breakup with his then-fiancée Patrizia, who left him for comedian Ninì Salerno.

== Reception ==
The song was described by Italian music critic Claudio Fabretti as "a defining divide for the whole of Italian music", with "love taking on a broader and deeper meaning. It breaks through the narrow confines of the couple's relationship, it becomes a universal sentiment, which unites men and at the same time condemns them to pain, to distance. It is the only prospect of salvation and, at the same time, a possible permanent damnation".

== Other versions ==
Artists who covered the song include Gianni Morandi, Tiziano Ferro, Fiorello and Paolo Benvegnù. In 2025, De Gregori recorded a duet version of the song with Checco Zalone for the album Pastiche.

== Track listing ==
No.	Title	Writer(s)	Length
1.	"Rimmel"	De Gregori	3:41
2.	"Piccola mela"	De Gregori	2:45

== Charts ==
Chart (1975)	Peak position
Italy (Musica e dischi)	18

== Certifications ==
Region	Certification	Certified units/sales
Italy (FIMI) Sales from 2009	Platinum	100,000^{‡}
^{‡} Sales+streaming figures based on certification alone.
