= Grigora I Ora Perase =

Album by Eleftheria Arvanitaki

Studio album by Eleftheria Arvanitaki
- Released: 2006
- Genre: Laika
- Label: Universal Music Greece

Eleftheria Arvanitaki chronology
Stis Akres Ap' Ta Matia Sou (2006)	Grigora I Ora Perase (2006)	Dinata 1986-2007 (2007)

Grigora I Ora Perase (The Time Passed Quickly) is an album by Greek folk singer Eleftheria Arvanitaki and it was released in 2006. On it, Eleftheria performs songs she wrote based on poetry mainly by Sappho. The album sold 15,000 copies in Greece and was certified gold four weeks after its release.

== Track listing ==
1. "Grigora I Ora Perase" (Instrumental)
2. "Athanati Afroditi"
3. "Theos Mou Fainetai"
4. "O Adonis"
5. "Polles Fores"
6. "Os Astra Gyro Vriskontai"
7. "Na 'Cha Pethanei"
8. "Pyretos Kryfos"
9. "Ti Thelo Ti"
10. "Grigora I Ora Perase"
11. "Afroditi"
12. "Ilisos"
13. "Iridanos"
14. "Einai Poly Noris"
15. "To Teleftaio Taxidi"
