= Tragoudia Gia Tous Mines =

Studio album by Eleftheria Arvanitaki
- Released: 1996
- Genre: Entechno, laiko, demotic
- Length: 50:00
- Label: PolyGram Greece, Polydor

Eleftheria Arvanitaki chronology
Megales Epityhies (1995)	Tragoudia Gia Tous Mines (1996)	Ektos Programmatos (1998)

Tragoudia Gia Tous Mines (Songs For The Months; Greek: Τραγούδια Για Τους Μήνες) is an album by popular Greek artist Eleftheria Arvanitaki and it was released in 1996. It was written and arranged by Dimitris Papadimitriou and the lyrics are poems by Sappho, Maria Polydouri, Kostas Karyotakis, Odysseas Elytis and Michalis Ganas, as well as traditional couplets. It sold over 60,000 copies in Greece and was certified Platinum. The vinyl collector's edition release of the album was in the form of a small record player. The CD album's package and the disk itself featured extensive artwork following mostly a theme on the sky and the constellations.

== Track listing ==
1. "Proti Isimeria" - First Equinox - "Πρώτη Ισημερία" - Orchestral; Thymios Papadopoulos in solo flute
2. "Sappho" - Sappho - "Σαπφώ" - Rendition of a Sappho's poem by Sotiris Kakisis
3. "Taximi" - Taqsim - "Ταξίμι" - Achilleas Persides in solo laouto
4. "Lianotragoudo" - Demotic distich song - "Λιανοτράγουδο" - Lyrics by Michalis Ganas
5. "Sou To' Pa Gia Ta Syneffa" - I told you about the clouds - "Σου το'πα για τα σύννεφα" - Poem by Elytis
6. "Den Tragoudo Para Giati M' Agapises" - I only sing because you loved me - "Δεν τραγουδώ παρά γιατί μ'αγάπησες" - Poem by Polydouri
7. "To Parapono"- The Plaint - "Το παράπονο" - Poem by Elytis; also singing: Giorgos Makras
8. "Pame Ksana Sta Thavmata" - Let's go again to the miracles - "Πάμε ξανά στα θαύματα" - Lyrics by Ganas
9. "O Agamemnon" - Agamemnon - "Ο Αγαμέμνων" - Poem by Elytis; also singing: Makras
10. "Defteri Isimeria" - Second Equinox - "Δεύτερη Ισημερία" - Orchestral
11. "Ola Ta Pire To Kalokairi" - Summer has taken everything - "Όλα τα πήρε το καλοκαίρι" - Poem by Elytis
12. "Se Palaio Symfoititi" - To an old fellow student - "Σε παλαιό συμφοιτητή" - Poem by Karyotakis
13. "Mavra Pionia" - Black Pawns - "Μαύρα Πιόνια" - Lyrics by Ganas
14. "Tou Pothou To Agrimi" - Lust's wild beast - "Του πόθου τ'αγρίμι" - Lyrics by Ganas
15. "San Tin Agapi Tin Krifi" - Like the hidden love - "Σαν την αγάπη την κρυφή" - Demotic distichs

== Tragoudia Gia Tous Mines: The Third Side ==
Tragoudia Gia Tous Mines: The Third Side (Songs For the Months: The Third Side) is an EP by Greek artist Eleftheria Arvanitaki that was released in 2000. It was a free collector's CD given away with the January 2000 issue of Difono magazine. The material was recorded during rehearsals for the Tragoudia Gia Tous Mines album, making it the unofficially "third side" of the album. However the album is recognized as an official release as revealed in the discography section of her official site.

=== Track listing ===
1. "To Parapono"
2. "Lianotragoudo"
3. "Agamemnon"
4. "Mavra Pionia"
5. "Ola Ta Pire To Kalokairi"
