= Loretta Goggi =

Italian actress and singer

- Goggi in 1981
- Born: 29 September 1950 (age 76); Rome, Italy
- Occupations: Singer; actress; television presenter
- Musical career
- Genres: Europop; eurodisco
- Instrument: Vocals
- Labels: RCA; Durium; VdP; CGD; Globe; CBS; WEA; Polydor; Fonit Cetra; Rhino

Loretta Goggi (Italian pronunciation: [loˈretta ˈɡɔddʒi]; born 29 September 1950) is an Italian singer, actress, and television presenter. Goggi's records have sometimes entered the Italian pop charts. She was the first runner-up at the 1981 Sanremo Festival with the song "Maledetta primavera", her most famous pop hit.

She co-founded the disco act Hermanas Goggi with her sister Daniela Goggi, who is also an artist. The duo found success in the Latin markets toward the end of the 1970s.

In 1973 she co-hosted a TV show in England with Sammy Davis Jr and performed with Alighiero Noschese on the Italian television program Formula Due.

In 2006 the American rapper T.I. sampled the Goggi's song "Molla tutto" for his song "Get It", contained in the album King, included in the soundtrack of the film Step Up.

Throughout her career Goggi achieved several accomplishments within the Italian television industry, including setting records. Among her notable contributions was her repertoire of impersonations of prominent figures, encompassing both men and women. While actresses like Isabella Biagini had already presented satirical impersonations on television, Goggi is regarded as the pioneer of female impersonation on Italian television. Her imitations were notable for their inclusion of satirical elements in the texts, thereby elevating the quality of her performances beyond mere parody.

In 1979 she became the first woman to host a television quiz in Italy for Fantastico, a well-known Italian Saturday night show. Goggi was also the host of the 1986 Sanremo Festival.

Goggi has won four Telegattos in four different categories: best theme song, best quiz, best music transmission and best female personality of the year.

She considers herself Catholic.

== Life and career ==
=== Early life ===
Born in Rome, Italy, to Giulio and Costanza Goggi, originally from Circello, she has two sisters: Liliana Goggi (1943) and Daniela Goggi (who eventually followed her into the show business). From a very young age Loretta Goggi studied singing and music. In 1959 she was discovered by Silvio Gigli, which led her to take part in the radio competition, Dino Verde Disco Magico, presented by Corrado with an orchestra conducted by Gianni Ferrio. Loretta won the competition together with Nilla Pizzi.

=== The sixties ===
In 1962 she made her debut as a child actress in the RAI television prose Sotto processo with the direction of Anton Giulio Majano, broadcast on the Secondo programma. In 1963 at the age of 12 she recorded her first song Se la cercherai, written by Nico Fidenco, with her first name Loretta, for the soundtrack of the French film Le Sang à la tête directed by Gilles Grangier.

Subsequently, Loretta was in the cast of many other famous Rai television dramas, in which she interpreted characters of fragile and needy girls (many times paired with another child actor, Roberto Chevalier, who later became a well-known voice actor) including Robinson non-deve morire (1963) by Vittorio Brignole, Demetrio Pianelli (1963) by Sandro Bolchi, I miserabili (1964), also by Bolchi in which she plays the role of Cosette as a child, Una tragedia americana (1962), Delitto e castigo (1963 ) and La cittadella (1964), all three directed by Anton Giulio Majano, Vita di Dante (1965) by Vittorio Cottafavi, in which she plays Beatrice, Questa sera parla Mark Twain and Scaramouche, with Domenico Modugno, both broadcast in 1965 and directed by Daniele D'Anza and in an episode of Le indagini del Commissario Maigret, directed by Mario Landi (1966). In these dramas Loretta has the opportunity to support great Italian actors such as Lilla Brignone, Gino Cervi, Andreina Pagnani, Paolo Stoppa, Rina Morelli, Giorgio Albertazzi and many others. In 1964, under the direction of Beppe Recchia, she was also in the cast of the children's drama C'era una volta la fiaba with Arturo Testa and Santo Versace; of the same year is also Le avventure della squadra di stoppa directed by Alda Grimaldi, another television drama aimed at children

Starting in 1965, having already participated in many television productions, she also dedicated herself to dubbing: she is the Italian voice of Tweety in the Warner Bros. Merrie Melodies (flanked by Gigi Proietti, who dubbed Sylvester the Cat), and famous actresses such as Katharine Ross, Kim Darby, Mita Medici, Agostina Belli, Ornella Muti and Silvia Dionisio; in the same period she deepend her studies in diction, piano and singing.

During the same period she also began working in the cinema (with small roles) and in the theater, where she played various shows by Molière, William Shakespeare and Luigi Pirandello.

In 1966 she participated in the Castrocaro Music Festival with the songs Ballando guancia a guancia and So cosa vuoi da me, which are still unpublished.

In 1968 she ventured for the first time with an adult role, taking part as the female protagonist of the play La freccia nera also directed by Anton Giulio Majano and based on the novel of the same name by Robert Louis Stevenson, in which she is flanked by Aldo Reggiani, Arnoldo Foà and Adalberto Maria Merli; the drama was successful (with peaks of 20 million viewers), and Loretta reached great fame.

In the meantime, she graduated from the International Linguistic High School in Rome.

She also played many photo novels in which she is flanked by Massimo Ranieri, Christian, Aldo Reggiani (formerly her partner in The Black Arrow) and Ben Elkland.

In 1968 she made her debut as a TV host with the television special Incontro con Lucio Battisti, followed by Il divo Claudio, Notturno di primavera, as well as Radio for schools and she is also a disc jockey on Vatican Radio, she also lends her voice also for some religious audio stories of the Edizioni Paoline. She also returned to singing, publishing several singles with the Durium Records record label, including Cibù Cibà written by Paolo Limiti.

=== The seventies ===
In 1970 she began to reveal her skills as an imitator in the TV show Jolly, presented by the Quartetto Cetra. In the summer of the same year Loretta led the show Estate insieme with Renzo Arbore, promoting emerging bands and solo singers, performing with her sister Daniela in the Boomerang Dance.

In 1971 she starred in three television dramas: E le stelle stanno a guardare, always directed by Anton Giulio Majano, in which is accompanied by Giancarlo Giannini, the episode Passi sulla neve of the series Racconti italiani del 900 for the direction of Giuseppe Fina and La sera della partita, directed by Gianni Baldi on the Secondo Programma.

She collaborated with Pippo Baudo in the radio program Caccia alla voce, replacing actor Franco Rosi, beginning to perform as an impersonator. After that, the conductor also included her with in the television variety show La freccia d'oro.

In the summer of 1971 she participated in the musical event Un disco per l'estate, with the song Io sto vivendo senza te and in November of the same year she participated in the World Popular Song Festival in Tokyo, reaching the semi-final. In the spring of 1972 she participated alongside Franco Franchi in the variety Teatro 11, a sort of parody of another Italian TV show Teatro 10, and starred in L'ombra del delitto, a television script for Swiss Italian-speaking television.

Positively impressed by the work experience with her on the radio and with La freccia d'oro, Pippo Baudo chose Goggi to support him in the 1972–73 edition of the Canzonissima variety show: on this occasion Loretta her talent revealed an entertainer, especially thanks to her ability to imitate women of show business like Mina, Sophia Loren, Nada, Gina Lollobrigida, Liza Minnelli and many others and for her it is the definitive consecration as a showgirl. Goggi also records the opening theme of the transmission, Vieni via con me (Taratapunzi-e) (written by Marcello Marchesi, Dino Verde, Enrico Simonetti and Pippo Baudo), winning her first gold record and always inside the program, launches other singles like Mani mani and Yeah!. All the songs are included on her first album Vieni via con me.

In the early months of 1973 she was hired in England for a TV show in which she joined Sammy Davis Jr.

In the autumn of the same year she returned to Italy and, together with the imitator Alighiero Noschese, was in the Saturday night variety Formula due, in which the couple performed a series of imitations and parodies and in which Loretta sang the theme song initial Molla tutto and promoted her second album, entitled Formula 2; this variety was the most popular Italian television program of 1973, with an average of 26 million viewers and it was also one of the first color TV shows experimentally recorded by Rai.

In 1974 Loretta realized her first live solo show at Bussola, Sergio Bernardini's Versilia club and in the same year published four singles produced by her manager Enrico Polito and Totò Savio, the latter then becoming Loretta's musical author until 1985.

In 1976 Goggi is still on Rai with Dal primo momento che ho ti visto, a curious mix of musical drama and television variety broadcast by Rete 1 (today's Rai 1), of which she is the protagonist together with Massimo Ranieri; in the program Loretta interprets the songs Notte matta, Dirtelo, non-dirtelo and Ma chi sei? (the latter Italian cover of the disco-music song Lady Bump by Penny McLean), which all enter hit-parade, enjoying great success.

Immediately after the end of the program, Goggi began a long summer tour.

In 1977 the new single, Ancora inamorati, was distributed in Italy, Greece, Germany, Spain and the United States. The B side contains the song Monsieur voulez-vous dançer?, a song from the disco-music vein, much in vogue at that time.

Once the contract with the producer and manager Polito expired, Loretta Goggi started her own business with her sister Daniela for an artistic duo. The couple therefore travels around Italy with the Go & Go show and a disco-music single, Domani, which was very successful.

In 1978, the Goggi sisters together with Pippo Franco, Oreste Lionello and the whole Bagaglino company, directed by Antonello Falqui, made the television variety Il ribaltone broadcast on Rai's Network 1, in which they sing the final theme Voglia. The program wins the Rosa d'Argento prize at the Montreux Festival in Switzerland as the best European television broadcast of the year.

Later the couple Goggi resumed the tour also in the rest of Europe. In Spain they publishes the album Estoy bailando cantado en español (never released in Italy) and the homonymous single, Spanish version of the song Sto ballando, previously recorded by Daniela alone (although sometimes the two sisters will perform together also in the version in the Italian version), which ends at the top of the Iberian hit parade and in those of many other Spanish-speaking countries.

In the autumn of the same year, Loretta returned to work as a soloist on television, conducting on Rai 1 the first edition of the Saturday night variety Fantastico, combined with the Italian Lottery, together with Beppe Grillo and the then newcomer Heather Parisi, directed by Enzo Trapani. The program was very successful, achieving an average of 26 million viewers; here she launched one of his most well-known but also vocally demanding songs: L'aria del sabato sera, which was used as the closing theme of the transmission, which brought Goggi back to the top of the Italian musical hit-parade, in which she was simultaneously present also with Cicciottella, a song destined for children, written for her by Bruno Lauzi and Pippo Caruso, used as the theme song for the Sunday variety Fantastico bis, a spin-off of the program she conducted, presented by Pippo Baudo.

In July 1979 she appeared on the cover of the Italian issue of Playboy, photographed by Roberto Rocchi.

In December of the same year she also appeared on the cover of Radiocorriere TV as godmother of the newborn Rai 3. For work needs in that period she moved from Rome to Milan, a transfer that became permanent. During the making of Fantastico, Loretta met the dancer and choreographer Gianni Brezza, recently separated from his wife, who became her partner and with whom he married in 2008, after 29 years of living together. Brezza became her manager, press officer, PR, choreographer and director until 2010 and look-maker and photographer (in the latter two cases only until 1983).

For the magazine Bolero, Loretta and Gianni together interpreted the photo novel Love on the high seas.

=== The eighties ===
In 1980 Loretta published the summer single Notti d'agosto, written for her by her dear friend Franco Califano and embarked on a new international tour with her sister Daniela entitled Supergoggi which goes up to the countries of Latin America.

In the same year, again with her sister Daniela, she was also the protagonist of an episode of the successful television variety Giochiamo al varieté, directed by Antonello Falqui broadcast on Rai's Network 1, in which the two sisters played famous couples of the Italian and international show business.

In 1981 she participated as a singer in the competition at the Sanremo Festival with her most famous song, Maledetta primavera, winning second place in the final ranking. Cursed spring sold over two million copies (of which many covers will be recorded in various foreign languages), receiving the gold disc and the platinum disc, soon becoming an evergreen of Italian music

The album containing Maledetta primavera, entitled Il mio prossimo amore, was released in the autumn of the same year, on the occasion of the TV show Hello Goggi, an early evening variety totally focused on Loretta and her imitations, which marks her passage from Rai to the then newborn Canale 5 (of which Hello Goggi was absolutely the first variety show). The album consists of nine songs, some of which have already been published. However, two songs included in the TV show will only be released on CD in 2000. The song-title of the album is used as the final theme of the show and the disc, thanks to the promotion made during the episodes of the variety, reaches the top of the musical charts.

In 1981 Loretta was also a protagonist in the theater, alongside Gigi Proietti (already his partner at the time of the dubbing), of the Italian edition of the They're Playing Our Song musical. A soundtrack of the same name was then released, containing all the songs of the show, in the Italian adaptation written by Carla Vistarini.

In the spring of 1983 Loretta went from Canale 5 to Rete 4 (a television station owned by the Arnoldo Mondadori Editore group at the time), where she conducted, together with Paolo Panelli and Luciano Salce, Gran varietà, a show on the early evening of Sunday. Within the program, Goggi presents her new album with an autobiographical and existential cut, Pieno d'amore; among the songs of the album that are the most successful, in addition to the song that gives the title to the disc, which reaches the top places in the hit parade, she recorded Oceano, a single used as the closing theme of the show. The songs will be promoted in numerous other television programs of the period in many radio programs.

In December 1983 Loretta returned to RAI where until 1985 she was the protagonist on Rai 1 as a presenter of the game show Loretta Goggi in a quiz (broadcast first on Friday, and in the second edition on Thursday), the first game show ever presented by a woman in Italy, under the direction of Emilio Uberti (in the first edition) and Gianni Brezza (in the second) who in 1984 won the Telegatto for Best quiz show. Two other songs by Goggi are chosen as the final theme of the two seasons of the program: in the first Una notte così, and in the second Notte all'opera.

In 1984 she recorded the song Un amore grande, written by Umberto Tozzi and Giancarlo Bigazzi and programmed to go to the competition at the Sanremo Festival, but Loretta gave up at the last moment her participation communicating that with an ANSA press release. It will be replaced by Pupo, who at that time was the author and music producer of his sister Daniela. However, the song is also recorded on disk by Loretta, who later promotes it in various television programs.

She returned to Sanremo in 1986, this time however as host of the 36th edition of the Festival: Goggi is the first woman to lead the event as the main presenter, achieving great success in terms of audience. For her Mango (one of the artists competing in that edition) writes the song Io nascerò, which is used as the initial theme of the singing festival (and later included in the album C'è poesia); the song soon became a gold disc, thus beating many sales songs competing at the Festival of that year.

In the mid-eighties there was a decisive turning point in the choice of Loretta's repertoire: in fact, she abandoned Totò Savio as a songwriter and went to the Fonit Cetra label and relied on the producer Mario Lavezzi, starting to interpret songs written by prestigious authors including Bruno Lauzi, Donatella Rettore, Ron, Zucchero Fornaciari, Dario Baldan Bembo, Enrico Ruggeri, Gianni Togni, Umberto Tozzi, Paolo Conte and Gianni Bella.

After the Sanremo experience, Loretta continues her television career, creating many successful programs broadcast by Rai 1 including Il bello della diretta, in spring 1986 on the Thursday prime time, in which she also presents her album, C'è poesia.

In the spring of 1987, always on Rai 1, it was the turn of Canzonissime, a show dedicated to the hundred years since the birth of the music Album, inside which Loretta also promoted her new album, C'è poesia due; the variety, made with great use of resources and budgets by Rai, initially scheduled for Thursday, following the success obtained from the first episodes, was promoted on Saturday prime time with excellent response from the public.

In the 1987–88 TV season, Goggi conducted a late afternoon program called Ieri Goggi e Domani in which she presented her new album, Donna io donna tu. The big success of the transmission caused the early closure of the direct competitor program Ciao Enrica conducted by Enrica Bonaccorti on Canale 5 at the same hour, and make Loretta Goggi win the Telegatto as Female television personality of the year.

In the following season 1988–89 it was the turn of the midday program, Via Teulada 66, always broadcast on Rai 1, in which she also presented her new album, Punti di vista; although the results obtained by the program were below expectations, in spring 1989 Goggi always won the TV Oscar as Female TV personality of the year.

=== The nineties ===
In the 1991–92 season she moved to Telemontecarlo where she presented the late night variety Festa di compleanno, broadcast every day from Monday to Friday, where in each episode, the birthday of a famous person was celebrated. In the same year she released her latest studio album, Si faran ... canzone, recorded for the Fonit Cetra label, which is presented during the show: among the most important tracks on the disc there are Storie all'italiana (song that was also used as the initials of the program) and Temporale.

Between the end of 1992 and the beginning of 1993 she returned to Rai again, conducting the Rai 2 variety specials Il canzoniere delle feste, aired in the early evening during the Christmas period.

In 1996 Johnny Dorelli proposed her to share with him the theater show Bobbi sa tutto, awarded with the Golden Ticket for the highest theatrical rank of 1996. Together with Dorelli, Loretta also play in the sit-com Due per tre, a series produced in three seasons, broadcast on Canale 5 on Sunday afternoon between 1997 and 1999.

In the summer of 1997 she also hosted the Rai 1 variety La zanzara d'oro, a talent show dedicated to the discovery of new comic actors, in which she was supported by actor Enzo Iacchetti.

On Mediaset she led with Mike Bongiorno four editions of the musical program Viva Napoli aired on Rete 4 (from 1998 to 2002), where she dueted with many competitors on very popular Canzone Napoletana repertoire. She had also won the second edition of 1996 as a competitor.

On 11 September 1998 she presented Il mio canto libero, a live concert-event dedicated to the death of Italian singer Lucio Battisti (who died just two days before) in Piazza del Campidoglio in Rome, interpreting the songs I giardini di marzo, Io vorrei, non-vorrei ma...se vuoi and other successes of the songwriter. The program is followed live on Canale 5 by over 8 million viewers.

In 1999, Goggi was the protagonist of Canale 5 prime time television show Innamorati pazzi, broadcast on Valentine's Day.

She join the Italian edition of the musical Hello, Dolly! next to Paolo Ferrari, produced in 1999 and represented with great success throughout Italy until 2003. The songs interpreted by Loretta in the musical will then be published in the homonymous album.

=== The 2000s ===
In 2000 the Auguri Loretta program was aired in two episodes on Rete 4 to celebrate her fifty birthday; the program is a collage of various clips that contains the best performances on Loretta's Mediaset networks.

In this period, however, she began to thin out her appearances on television, and devoted herself mainly to theater. She also returned to engage in dubbing with the animated film Monsters, Inc., lending her voice to the archivist Roz.

She played in Maledetta Primavera Show, directed by Fabrizio Angelini, a show represented throughout 2003 at the Colosseum Theater in Rome. In 2004–2005 she starred instead in the musical show Molto rumore (senza rispetto) per nulla, directed by Lina Wertmüller.

In 2006 she also resumed her activity as an actress in the cinema, playing the mother of the protagonist in the film Gas by Luciano Melchionna, obtaining the nomination for the 2006 Nastro d'Argento for Best Supporting Actress.

In 2006 the American rapper T.I. samples her song Molla tutto for his song Get It, contained in the King album, used also for the soundtrack of the film Step Up.

In 2006–2007, she brought her one-woman show directed by Gianni Brezza to the theater Se stasera sono qui. The show resumes songs, then collected in an album of the same name, as well as characterizations, imitations and comic monologues.

In September 2007 she returned to television, conducting the 68th edition of Miss Italia on Rai 1, together with Mike Bongiorno. The controversy that culminated almost in a clash with the colleague presenter, followed by the abandonment of the stage, is famous. Returning to the running of the show, she stressed her protests over the alleged minor role that Mike seemed to want to entrust to her

On 26 April 2008 Loretta Goggi married her partner Gianni Brezza in Orbetello, in Tuscany. In this decade, Goggi returns to appear and work on television assiduously.

=== The 2010s ===
In 2010 she was in the variety show Ciak ... si canta and in the same year, the digital reissues of her records are published by Rhino Records for Warner Music Group.

For the theater season 2009/2010 she's on stage with SPA – Solo Per Amore, again directed by Gianni Brezza. To accompany the artist, an orchestra of twelve musicians and a corps de ballet of ten dancers. The show also went on stage during summer 2010 and for the 2010/2011 theater season. However, the actress was forced to suspend the tour due to the worsening health conditions of her husband, the director and choreographer Gianni Brezza, who died in Rome on 5 April 2011.

On 28 October 2011 Loretta returns to television, for the first time after the death of her husband, as a guest of Carlo Conti in the variety I migliori anni. During this evening she received a prize for her 50 years of career in the show business.

In 2012 she was part of the jury of the new talent show of Rai 1, Tale e quale show, the Italian edition of Your Face Sounds Familiar conducted by Carlo Conti, joined with Christian De Sica and Claudio Lippi. In the same year she starred in the comedy film Pazze di me by Fausto Brizzi, which marks her return to the big screen after seven years of absence.

From November 2013 Loretta returns to the set of a television fiction, starring in Un' altra vita, a six-episode series starring Vanessa Incontrada, Cesare Bocci and Daniele Liotti, directed by Cinzia TH Torrini, which is broadcast in autumn 2014 on Rai 1 with great public success.

On 5 November 2013, she published an autobiographical book entitled Io nascerò – La forza della mia fragilità, published by the Edizioni Piemme.

In the autumn of 2014 she returned once again to take on the role of judge in the fourth edition of Tale e quale show, always conducted by Carlo Conti.

Loretta and her sister Daniela, on 8 December 2014 released a CD, remixed by Marco Lazzari and produced by Rolando D'Angeli, with their greatest dance hits, titled Hermanas Goggi Remixed.

In the autumn of 2015 she was once again judge of the variety-talent Tale e quale show always conducted by Carlo Conti, supported in this edition by Claudio Lippi, Gigi Proietti (who took over from Christian De Sica) plus a fourth judge, different for every episode.

In the same period, the fiction Come fai sbagli begins, directed by Tiziana Aristarco and Riccardo Donna, starring Daniele Pecci, Caterina Guzzanti, Francesca Inaudi and Enrico Ianniello, broadcast on Rai 1 in spring 2016.

Later she was one of the protagonists of another TV fiction Sorelle, directed by Cinzia TH Torrini starring Anna Valle, Ana Caterina Morariu, Giorgio Marchesi and Alessio Vassallo, and successfully broadcast in spring 2017.

On 29 October 2018, the FIMI (Federation of Italian Music Industry), awarded Maledetta primavera the certification of Vintage Golden Disco.

On 4 April 2019 the short film Sogni was presented, written and directed by Angelo Longoni, in which Loretta is the protagonist, and where she returns to work in pairs with her sister Daniela. The short film deals with the theme of Alzheimer's disease seen from the point of view of those who suffer from it

In autumn 2019, in addition to again taking on the role of juror at Tale e quale show, she also returns to the cinema with the comedy Appena un minuto, directed by Francesco Mandelli starring Max Giusti, Paolo Calabresi, Dino Abbrescia and Massimo Wertmüller, and she appear in a cameo role on the television fiction of Cinzia TH Torrini Pezzi unici, in the role of Viviana, client of the protagonist Sergio Castellitto.

In the same period she is also the protagonist of an episode of the program A raccontare comincia tu, conducted by Raffaella Carrà on Rai 3, and she is on the set of three films due out in 2020: Burraco fatale, directed by Giuliana Gamba, Ritorno al crimine, directed by Massimiliano Bruno and Glassboy, directed by Samuele Rossi.

She is also a writer in the book Un mondo per tutti, published by Il Castoro, a collection of nine short stories for children written in support of AMREF.

== Discography ==
- 1958 – Lourdes 1858 – Le Apparizioni Della Madonna Con Bernardette (C.V.S.) (Spoken Word Album)
- 1963 – La Meravigliosa Storia Di Giovanni Sebastiano Bach (Orpheus S.p.A. – E-30) – Spoken Word Album with Ubaldo Lay
- 1972 – Vieni via con me (Durium, MS A 77308)
- 1973 – Formula 2 (Durium, MS A 77336)
- 1978 – Il ribaltone (CGD, 20082; with Daniela Goggi)
- 1979 – Estoy bailando cantado en español (Hispavox, S 50 265; con Daniela Goggi published as Hermanas Goggi)
- 1981 – Il mio prossimo amore (WEA, T 58365)
- 1981 – Stanno suonando la nostra canzone (Polydor, 2448 129; with Gigi Proietti and the cast)
- 1982 – Pieno d'amore (WEA, 2 400401)
- 1986 – C'è poesia (Fonit Cetra, TLPX 153)
- 1987 – C'è poesia due (Fonit Cetra, TLPX 180)
- 1988 – Donna io donna tu (Fonit Cetra, TLPX 199)
- 1989 – Punti di vista (Fonit Cetra, TLPX 216)
- 1991 – Si faran... canzone (Fonit Cetra, TLPX 280)
- 1999 – Hello, Dolly! O.S.T. (Tri Angle)
- 2007 – Se stasera sono qui O.S.T. (LG)
- 2014 – Hermanas Goggi Remixed (Don't Worry Records, DW103/2014; published as Hermanas Goggi)

== TV programs ==
- Incontro con Lucio Battisti (Programma Nazionale, 1968)
- Incontri musicali – Tre tuttofare (Programma Nazionale, 1969)
- Il divo Claudio (Programma Nazionale, 1969)
- Un cantante di campagna (Programma Nazionale, 1970)
- Piccola ribalta (Secondo Programma, 1970)
- Estate insieme (Programma Nazionale, 1971)
- La freccia d'oro (Programma Nazionale, 1971)
- Teatro 11 (Programma Nazionale, 1972)
- Canzonissima 1972 (Programma Nazionale, 1972–1973)
- Formula due (Programma Nazionale, 1973–1974)
- Il ribaltone (Rete 1, 1978)
- Il ribaltone – Speciale Montreux (Rete 1, 1979)
- Fantastico (Rete 1, 1979–1980)
- Mostra Internazionale di Musica Leggera (Rete 1, 1981)
- Musica per tutti (Rete 2, 1981)
- Hello Goggi (Canale 5, 1981)
- Gran varietà (Rete 4, 1983)
- Loretta Goggi in quiz (Rai 1, 1983–1985)
- Festival di Sanremo 1986 (Rai 1, 1986)
- Il bello della diretta (Rai 1, 1986)
- Buon anno 1987 (Rai 1, 1987)
- Canzonissime (Rai 1, 1987)
- Saint Vincent Estate '87 (Rai 1, 1987)
- Effetto Non stop: dieci anni dopo (Rai 1, 1987)
- Ieri, Goggi e domani (Rai 1, 1987–1988)
- Via Teulada 66 (Rai 1, 1988–1989)
- Uno, due, tre...RAI – Vela d'oro (Rai 1, 1989)
- Festa di compleanno (TMC, 1991)
- Il canzoniere delle feste (Rai 2, 1992–1993)
- Arrivano le nostre – Un autunno molto speciale (TMC, 1996)
- La zanzara d'oro (Rai 1, 1997)
- Il mio canto libero – Concerto per Lucio Battisti (Canale 5, 1998)
- Innamorati pazzi (Canale 5, 1999)
- Viva Napoli (Rete 4, 1997, 2000–2002)
- Miss Italia (Rai 1, 2007)
- Tale e quale show (Rai 1, 2012-2023) judge
- Tale e quale show – Il torneo (Rai 1, 2012-in corso) judge
- Tale e quale show – Duetti (Rai 1, 2013) judge
- NaTale e quale show (Rai 1, 2016) judge
- Tali e Quali Show (Rai 1, 2019) judge
- Benedetta primavera (Rai 1, 2023)

== Filmography ==
=== Films ===
Year	Title	Role(s)	Notes
1965	I Knew Her Well	Receptionist	Cameo appearance
1966	Mi vedrai tornare	Duchess Alina	
1967	Nel Sole	Giulia Cantini	
1968	Bambi	Bambi (voice)	Italian-dubbed version (redub)
1969	Zingara	Marisa Donati	
2001	Monsters, Inc.	Roz (voice)	Italian-dubbed version
2005	Gas	Anna	
2013	Pazze di me	Vittoria Morelli	
2013	Monsters University	Roz (voice)	Italian-dubbed version
2018	La stella di Andra e Tati	Adult Andra (voice)	Short film
2019	Appena un minuto	Mirella	
2020	Burraco fatale	Sibilla	
2021	Ritorno al crimine	Sabrina	
2021	Glassboy	Grandma Helena	
2021	Luigi Proietti, detto Gigi	Herself	Documentary

=== Television ===
Year	Title	Role(s)	Notes
1962	Una tragedia americana	Julie	Episode: "Episodio 1"
1963	Robinson non-deve morire	Maud Cantley	Television film
1963	Prima di cena	Irina	Television film
1963	Delitto e castigo	Polenka	Main role
1963	Demetro Pianelli	Arabella	Television film
1964	La Cittadella	Florrie	2 episodes
1964	I miserabili	Cosette	Main role
1964	Le avventure della squadra di stoppa	Mariuccia Accordi	Television film
1965	Vita di Dante	Beatrice	Main role
1965	Questa sera parla Mark Twain	Susy	3 episodes
1965	Scaramouche	Monreale Barouness	Episode: "Episodio 4"
1966	Castrocaro Music Festival	Herself (contestant)	Annual music festival
1966	Le inchieste del commissario Maigret	Francine	Episode: "Non si uccidono i poveri diavoli"
1966	I tre diavoli	Bettina	Television film
1968–1969	La freccia nera	Joan Sedley	Main role
1969	Incontro con Lucio Battisti	Herself (co-host)	Special
1970	Centostorie	Narrator (voice)	Episode: "Il fanciullo stella"
1971	La freccia d'oro	Herself (co-host)	Game show
1971	E le stelle stanno a guardare	Grace	Recurring role; 5 episodes
1972	Teatro 11	Herself (co-host)	Variety show
1972–1973	Canzonissima	Herself (co-host)	Annual music festival
1976	Dal primo momento che ti ho visto	Evelina Mariani	Main role
1978	Il ribaltone	Herself (co-host)	Game show
1979–1980	Fantastico	Herself (host)	Variety show (season 1)
1981	Hello Goggi	Herself (host)	Variety show
1983	Gran Varietà	Herself (host)	Variety show
1983–1985	Loretta Goggi in quiz	Herself (host)	Game show
1986	Sanremo Music Festival 1986	Herself (host)	Annual music festival
1986	Il bello della diretta	Herself (host)	Variety show
1987	Canzonissime	Herself (host)	Talent show
1987	Un disco per l'estate	Herself (host)	Annual music festival
1987–1988	Ieri, Goggi e domani	Herself (host)	Talk show
1988–1989	Via Telauda 66	Herself (host)	Variety show
1991	Festa di compleanno	Herself (host)	Variety show (season 1)
1992–1993	Il canzoniere delle feste	Herself (host)	Variety show
1997–1999	Due per tre	Elena Antonioli	Lead role
1997; 2000	Viva Napoli	Herself (host)	Specials
1998	Il mio canto libero	Herself (host)	Special
1999	Innamorati pazzi	Herself (host)	Reality show
2007	Miss Italia 2007	Herself (host)	Annual beauty contest
2012–present	Tale e quale show	Herself (judge)	Imitation talent show
2014	Un'altra vita	Elvira Guarnieri	Main role
2016	Padre Pio, servitore della Misericordia	Narrator (voice)	Special
2016	Come fai sbagli	Nora Martini	Main role
2017	Sorelle	Antonia Silani	Main role
2019	Pezzi unici	Viviana	2 episodes
2021	Fino all'ultimo battito	Margherita Conti	Main role
2022	Più forti del destino	Elvira	Main role
