= Scialpi =

Italian pop singer (born 1962)

Giovanni Scialpi (born 14 May 1962), known simply as Scialpi or Shalpy (Italian pronunciation: [ˈʃalpi]), is an Italian pop singer, active from the early 1980s.

== Background ==
Born in Parma, Scialpi had an immediate success in the Summer of 1983 with the song "Rocking Rolling". Considered a sex symbol, in the 1980s he amassed several domestic hits, alternating romantic ballads (such as "Cigarettes and Coffee") and upbeat songs marked by futuristic lyrics (such as the cited "Rocking Rolling" and "No East No West", with whom he entered the competition at the 1986 Sanremo Music Festival). In 1988 he won the Festivalbar with the song "Pregherei". Since the 1990s he gradually slowed down his production although he never dropped out from music altogether.

Scialpi also appeared as an actor in an episode of the TV series Derrick and starred on several stage musicals. In 1990 he co-hosted the variety television Ricomincio da due together with Raffaella Carrà.

In 2012 he changed his stage name to Shalpy.

In July 2015 he announced his marriage with Roberto Blasi, an actor. They had been in a relationship since 2009.

In September 2015 he took part to the fourth Italian edition of Pechino Express.

== Discography ==
=== Selected singles ===
- ″Rocking Rolling″ (1983)
- ″Mi manchi tu″ (1983)
- ″Cigarettes and Coffee″ (1984)
- ″No East No West″ (1986)
- ″Cry″ (1986)
- ″Bella età″ (1987)
- ″Pregherei″ (with Scarlett, 1988)
- ″Il grande fiume″ (1990)
- ″A... amare″ (1991)
- ″È una nanna″ (1992)
- ″Baciami″ (1994)
- ″Che per amore fai″ (1995)
- ″Bella signora″ (1998)
- ″La creazione″ (2001)
- ″Sono quel ragazzo″ (2002)
- ″Pregherò Imparerò Salverò″ (2003)
- ″Non ti amo più″ (2005)
- ″Goodbye″ (2006)
- ″I believe I can fly″ (2011)
- ″Here I am″ (2011)
- ″Ilventocaldodellestate″(2012)
- ″Icon-man″ (2012)
- ″Music is Mine″ (2013)
- ″Came to Me″ (2014)

=== Studio albums ===
- Es-tensioni (1983)
- Animale (1984)
- Scialpi (1986)
- Yo soy el amor (1987)
- Un morso e via (1988)
- Trasparente (1990)
- Neroe (1991)
- 360 gradi (1992)
- XXX (1994)
- Spazio 1995 (1995)
- Scialpi (2000)
- Spingi, invoca, ali (2003)
- Autoscatto (2006)
- Liberi e Romantici (2011)
