= Fonit Cetra =

Italian record company

- Founded: 16 December 1957
- Founder: Edgardo Trinelli
- Defunct: 2000
- Status: Defunct
- Genre: Pop
- Country of origin: Italy

Fonit Cetra was an Italian record label, active between 1957 and 2000.

== History ==
Fonit Cetra was founded in 1957 from merging two already existing labels: Cetra (acronym from Compagnia per edizioni, teatro, registrazioni ed affini), owned by RAI and previously EIAR, and Fonit (acronym from Fonodisco Italiano Trevisan), founded in 1911 in Milan. Both labels had already been popular, thanks to such artists as Nilla Pizzi, Achille Togliani, Natalino Otto and Domenico Modugno. Fonit Cetra continued to use two old names on their records and maintained two different offices, in Turin and Milan, until the 1970s, when the main headquarters were relocated to Milan. In July 1987, the company's name was changed to Nuova Fonit Cetra. In 1997, it became part of RAI Trade, however, in 1998, it was sold to Warner Music Group which acquired its catalogue.

Among the artists who have recorded for Fonit Cetra, were Claudio Villa, Sergio Endrigo, Marisa Sannia, Marco Armani, New Trolls, Patty Pravo, Milva, Bruno Venturini, Otello Profazio, Gipo Farassino, Amedeo Minghi, Mietta, Loretta Goggi, Raffaella Carrà, Mia Martini, Luca Barbarossa, Michele Zarrillo, Ricchi e Poveri, Gino Paoli, Gig Finizio, Renzo Arbore, Nancy Cuomo, Rosa Balistreri, and Maria Carta.
