= Alberto Salerno =

Italian lyricist and producer (born 1949)

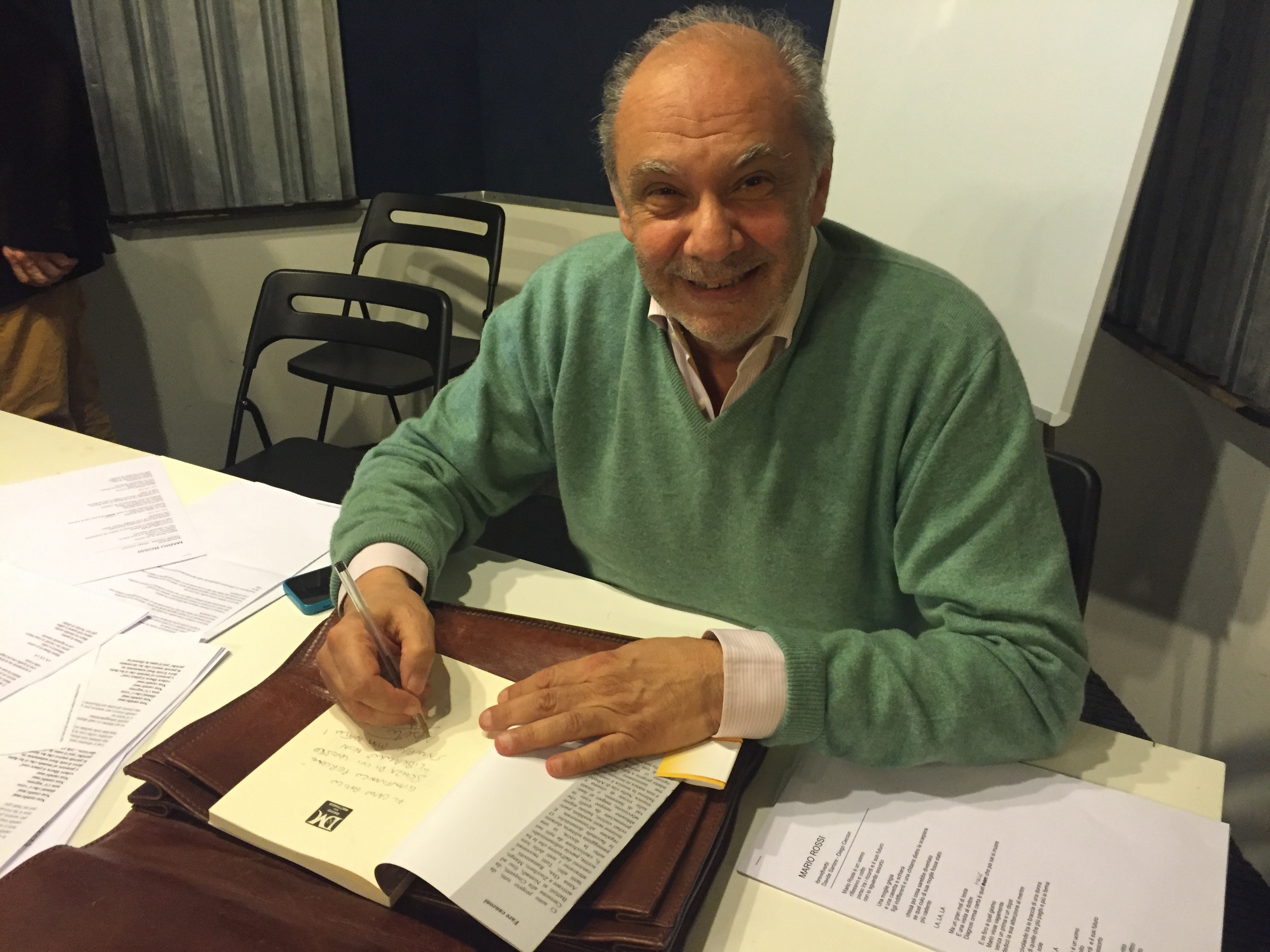
- Salerno in 2016
- Born: 30 December 1949 (age 76); Milan, Italy
- Occupations: Lyricist; record producer
- Spouse: Mara Maionchi (m. 1976)
- Children: 2
- Father: Nicola Salerno

Alberto Salerno (born 30 December 1949) is an Italian lyricist and producer.

== Life and career ==
Born in Milan, Salerno is the son of the popular lyricist Nisa. He started composing lyrics in the late 1960s, becoming a usual collaborator of Mino Reitano, and writing hits such as Dik Dik's "L'isola di Wight" and Nomadi's "Io vagabondo". In 1977 his song "Bella da morire", performed by Homo Sapiens, won the Sanremo Music Festival. He started his activity as a producer 1979 with the debut album of Alberto Fortis.

In the 1980s Salerno started a long collaboration with Mango, contributing to the lyrics of successful songs such as "Lei verrà" and "La rosa dell'inverno", and co-wrote Eros Ramazzotti's first hit, "Terra promessa". In the 2000s he contributed to launch the career of Tiziano Ferro. His songs "Senza pietà", performed by Anna Oxa, and "Per dire di no", performed by Alexia, won the 49th and 53rd editions of the Sanremo Music Festival, respectively. His collaborations also include Zucchero Fornaciari, Mina, Marcella Bella, Nino Buonocore, and Syria.

In 2001, Salerno wrote the lyrics for the songs of the animation film Aida of the Trees.
