= Eleftheria Arvanitaki =

Greek folk singer

Eleftheria Arvanitaki Ελευθερία Αρβανιτάκη
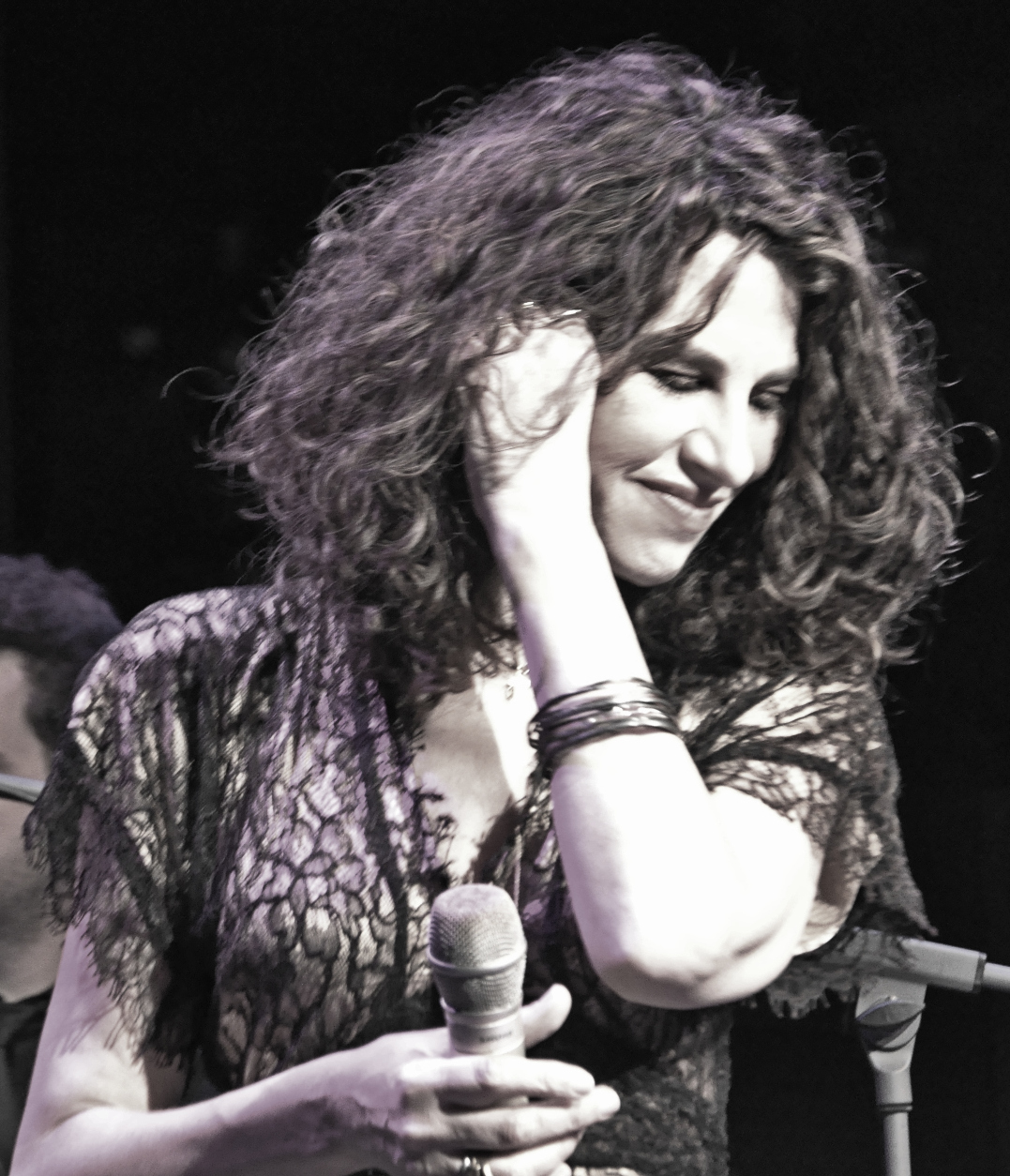
- Eleftheria Arvanitaki in 2012

Background information
- Born: 17 October 1957 (age 68)
- Origin: Icaria, Greece
- Genres: Laïko, rembetika, folk, jazz, dance
- Years active: 1981–present
- Labels: Lyra; Universal Music Greece; EmArcy
- Website: arvanitaki.gr

Eleftheria Arvanitaki (Greek: Ελευθερία Αρβανιτάκη) (born 17 October 1957 in Piraeus) is a Greek folk singer. She originates from the island of Icaria. Arvanitaki has worked with musicians such as Cesária Évora, Arto Tunçboyacıyan and Ara Dinkjian. On 14 March 2010 Alpha TV ranked her the sixth top-certified female artist in the nation's phonographic era (since 1960).

== Career ==
Arvanitaki started her singing career in 1980, by joining the group Opisthodromiki Kompania (Οπισθοδρομική Κομπανία, "Retrograde Company") and in 1981 she had her first guest appearance on a CD, by being featured in the album of Vangelis Germanos titled "Ta Barakia". She broke away from the group and started a solo career in 1984 with her album Eleftheria Arvanitaki.

In August 2004, she participated in the closing ceremony of the Athens Olympics.

She has performed in several WOMAD and other festivals. In 2006 she took part in the Christmas concert "Frostroses" in Reykjavik, Iceland as a part of a group of singers named "European Divas". The other "divas" were Sissel Kyrkjebø (Norway), Eivør Pálsdóttir (Faroe Islands), Petula Clark (UK), Ragga Gisla (Iceland) and Patricia Bardon (Ireland).

Thanks to her contract with Universal Music Group's jazz label Verve Records, her music has enjoyed international release and exposure to some extent. Verve has subsequently assigned her to the EmArcy label, Universal's European jazz arm, whose focus includes developing local European talent to an international calibre. Her recordings are all generally produced under her native signing with Universal Music Greece.

She is a cousin of award-winning Greek Australian filmmaker Anthony Maras.
