= Stadio Olimpico =

Stadium in Rome, Italy

- Stadio Olimpico
- The Olimpico
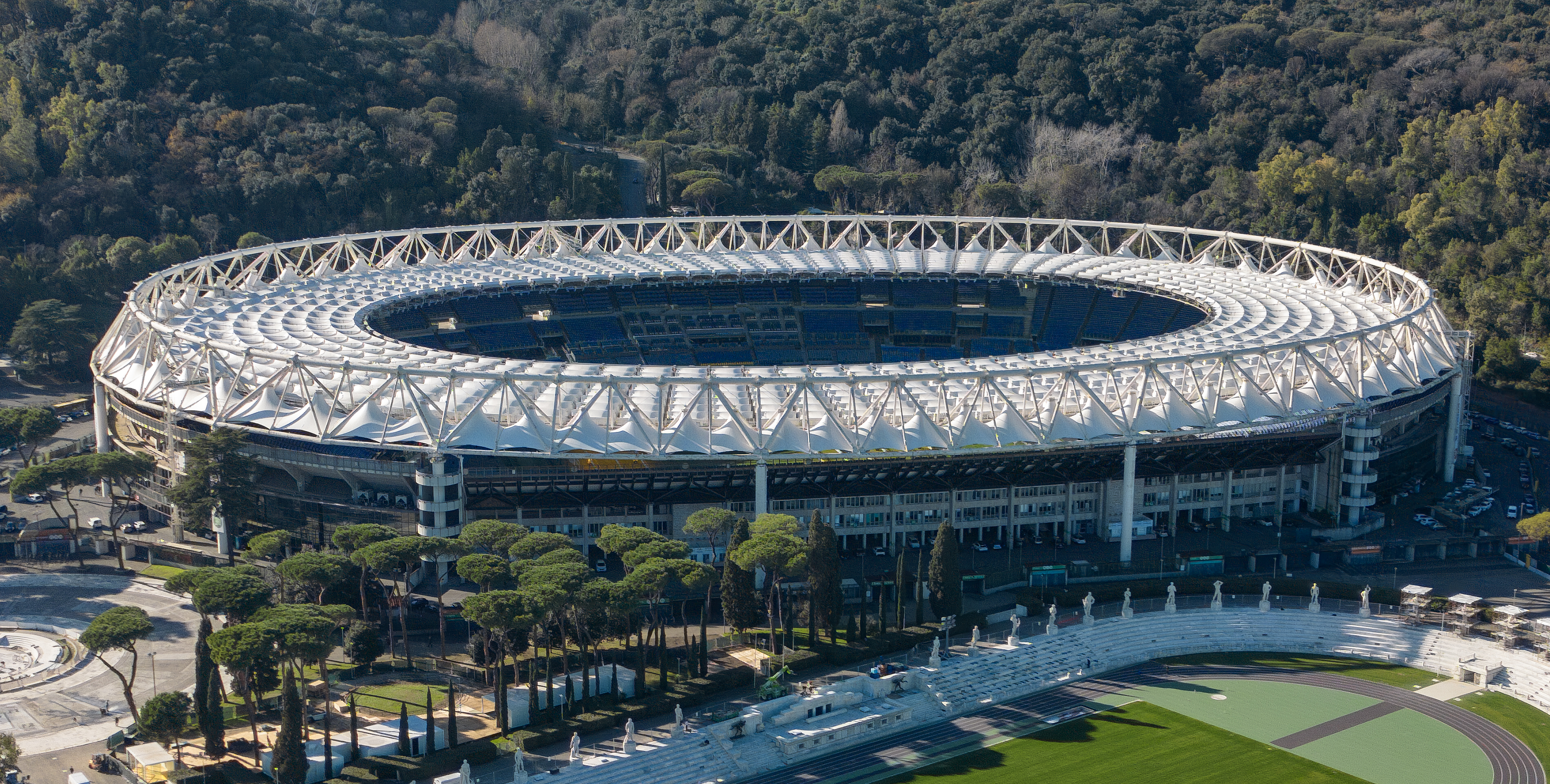
- External view of the venue UEFA
- Interactive map of Stadio Olimpico
- Former names: Stadio dei Cipressi (1928–53); Stadio dei Centomila (1953–60)
- Address: Viale dello Stadio Olimpico; Rome; Italy
- Coordinates: 41°56′02″N 12°27′17″E
- Elevation: 21 m (69 ft)
- Owner: Sport e Salute
- Operator: Italian National Olympic Committee
- Capacity: 70,634
- Type: Stadium
- Event: sporting events
- Surface: Grass
- Scoreboard: 2, atop of Northern and Southern stands
- Record attendance: 78,886 (12 May 1974, Lazio – Foggia 1-0)
- Field size: 105 × 68 m (115 x 74 yd)
- Field shape: Rectangular
- Current use: Association football venue Athletics venue Rugby union venue Concert venue
- Public transit: ATAC tram line 2; bus lines 32, 69, 168, 188, 200, 226, 280, 301, 446, 628, 910, 911

Construction
- Groundbreaking: 1928
- Built: 1928–53
- Opened: 17 May 1953
- Renovated: 1988–90, 2007–08
- Cost: 3,400,000,000 ITL (1953); 233,000,000,000 ITL (1988–90); 17,000,000 € (2007–08)
- Architects: E. Del Debbio (1928); L. Moretti (1933–37); C. Valle (1951); A. Vitellozzi (1951–53, 1988–90); M. Clerici (1988–90)
- Builder: Speroni (1928)
- Structural engineers: A. Frisa, A. Pintonello (1927); C. Roccatelli (1951–53); P. Teresi, A.M. Michetti, M. Majowiecki (1988–90)
- General contractor: Co.Ge.Far. (1988–90)

Tenants
- SS Lazio AS Roma Italy (football) Italy (rugby union): 1953–present 1953–present 1953–present 1954–present

Stadio Olimpico (pronounced [ˈstaːdjo oˈlimpiko]; English: Olympic Stadium), colloquially known as l'Olimpico (The Olympic), is an Italian multi-purpose sports venue located in Rome. Seating over 70,000 spectators, it is the largest sports facility in Rome and the second-largest in Italy, after Milan's San Siro. It formerly had a capacity of over 100,000 people, and was also called Stadio dei Centomila (Stadium of the 100,000). It is owned by Sport e Salute, a government agency that manages sports venues, and its operator is the Italian National Olympic Committee.

The Olimpico is located in northwestern Rome in the Foro Italico sports complex. Construction began in 1928 under Enrico Del Debbio and the venue was expanded in 1937 by Luigi Moretti. World War II interrupted further expansions; after the Liberation of Rome in June 1944, the stadium was used by the Allies as vehicle storage and as a location for Anglo-American military competitions. After the war, the Italian National Olympic Committee (CONI), appointed as operator of the venue, completed construction, and it was opened on 17 May 1953 with a football game between Italy and Hungary. Since opening, the stadium has been home to the city's principal professional football clubs, S.S. Lazio and A.S. Roma. Ciro Immobile has scored the most goals at the stadium (120). It changed its name to Olimpico in 1955, when Rome was awarded responsibility for the 1960 Summer Olympics. Before 1990, the venue was almost entirely unroofed, except for the Monte Mario Grandstand (Italian: Tribuna Monte Mario). In 1990, the Olimpico was rebuilt and roofed for the 1990 FIFA World Cup.

The Olimpico was the principal venue for the 1968 and 1980 European Championships as well as the 1990 FIFA World Cup, hosting the grand final for each competition, as well as a group stage and one of the quarter-finals of the 2020 European Championship. The venue hosted two finals of the European Cup, in 1977 and 1984, and two UEFA Champions' League finals, in 1996 and 2009. Since 2008, the Olimpico has hosted the Coppa Italia final. The Olimpico hosted the opening and closing ceremonies and track-and-field events of the 1960 Olympics, the 1974 European Athletics Championships, the 1987 World Championships in Athletics and the 1975 Universiade. In 2024, it hosted the European Athletics Championships. It has hosted the Golden Gala since 1980 and, since 2012, is the usual venue of the Italian rugby union team in the Six Nations Championship.

After its 1990 reconstruction, the stadium has also hosted concerts. The record for highest attendance for a musical event at the stadium was set in 1998 when 90,000 spectators attended a concert of Claudio Baglioni.

== History ==
=== Stadio dei Cipressi ===
The 1909 plan for the city, designed by the architect and urban planner Edmondo Sanjust, had no sports venues in the northwestern sector of Rome. In 1926, the fascist regime, which saw sport as an effective propaganda tool, changed the plan to include an area for a sports complex. The 85-hectare area was a swamp at the bottom of a hill called Monte Mario, on the right bank of the river Tiber, in the Della Vittoria quarter.

The Foro Italico sports complex was commissioned by the Opera Nazionale Balilla (ONB), a youth organisation established by the Fascist government. Work commenced in 1928 under the supervision of the architect Enrico Del Debbio, and the Stadio dei Cipressi was one of the venues partially completed in time to celebrate the 10th anniversary of the establishment of fascism in Italy. The stadium was opened to the public on 22 October 1932, though without the planned capacity of 100,000. Its main terrace was located on the slope of Monte Mario; because the ground was marshy from rainwater that came down the hill, the playing field was created by raising the ground by 4 meters with two million cubic meters of soil excavated for the foundations. The facility was suitable for both sporting competitions and large gatherings due to its pitch covering ~20,000 square metres.

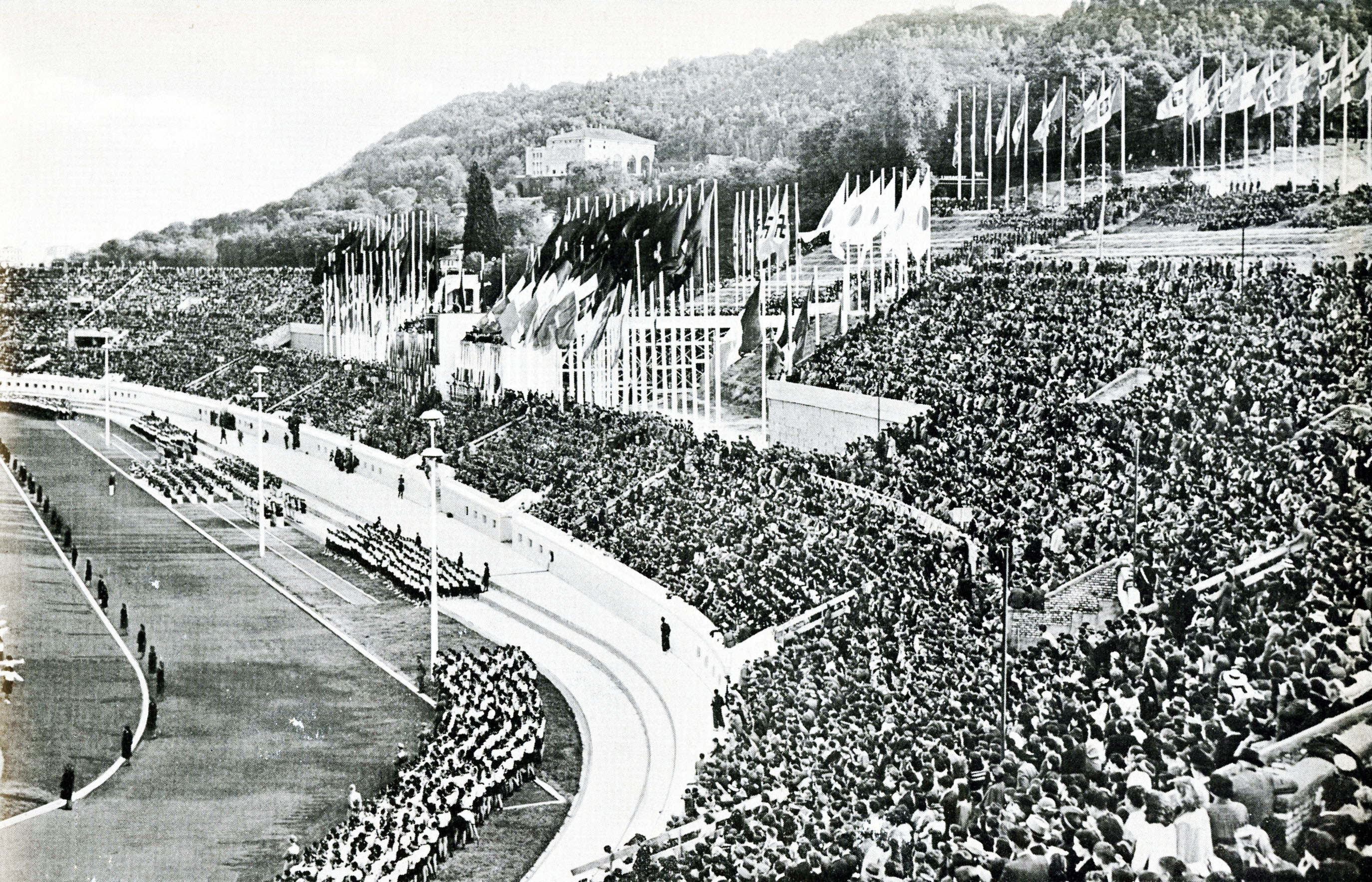
The stadium in 1941 during a celebration of the Tripartite Pact

The official opening took place on the 14th anniversary of the Italian victory in World War I, with a gymnastics exhibition organized by the various youth Fascist associations.

Since the regime intended to apply to host the 1940 Summer Olympics, starting from 1933 the Stadio dei Cipressi was extended. This was completed by architects Luigi Moretti, Angelo Frisa and Achille Pintonello, who designed a concrete structure which hosted a main football pitch and secondary pitches for basketball and weightlifting. The expanded stadium was opened on 9 May 1937, the first anniversary of the Italian Empire. While the capacity of the stadium was less than 60,000, there were plans to raise it to 100,000. After the absorption of the ONB by the National Fascist Party's youth branch, the Gioventù Italiana del Littorio (GIL), the GIL became the owner of the stadium and the rest of the sports complex.

Despite becoming a multisport venue, the stadium was never used for anything other military exhibitions and mass gatherings. In 1938, it hosted a parade to welcome German dictator Adolf Hitler during his state visit in Rome and, later, to host a gymnastics exhibition organized by the GIL.

In September 1941 the stadium hosted a military celebration of the Tripartite Pact, the political and military alliance between Italy, Germany and Japan.

Planned extensions of the stadium were interrupted by the Italian campaign in WWII and the subsequent fall of Fascism in Italy. When Allied forces entered Rome in 1944, the stadium was used by the Allied troops for vehicle storage and military sports events.

With the fall of the Fascism regime in Italy, the Badoglio government abolished Fascist organizations and reassigned their assets to a new agency, called the Commissariato della Gioventù Italiana (Commission for the Italian Youth), with the provision that after the end of World War II, the Commission's assets would be absorbed into either the Defence Office or the Education Department, depending on their purpose. However, the Commission was never abolished and it retained ownership of the Foro Italico, including the stadium.

=== Stadio dei Centomila ===
After World War II, the Italian National Olympic Committee (CONI) was appointed as operator of the site. CONI chairman Giulio Onesti announced that renewal works would finish in 1950.

The renewal project was led by engineer Carlo Roccatelli and architect Cesare Valle.

The stadium's governance was the subject of a fierce political battle. The Communist Party, through its newspaper, l'Unità, accused the Commission for the Italian Youth, led by Giovanni Valente – a member of the Christian Democracy party – of misuse of the complex to establish a sports organization parallel to CONI to favour sports clubs close to Azione Cattolica, a lay Catholic association. Later in the decade, l'Unità also accused Valente of mortgaging the complex for three billion lire (approx. 1,500,000 € or 1,600,000 $), to finance ENAL that Valente directed in establishing an alternative betting pool to the Totocalcio (organized by CONI). In 1976, the Commission was abolished and its assets were absorbed by the Italian government.

Annibale Vitellozzi replaced Roccatelli in 1951 after the latter's death. In 1952, the stadium's reconstruction was completed, at a cost of 3,400,000,000 lire (approx 1,700,000 €).

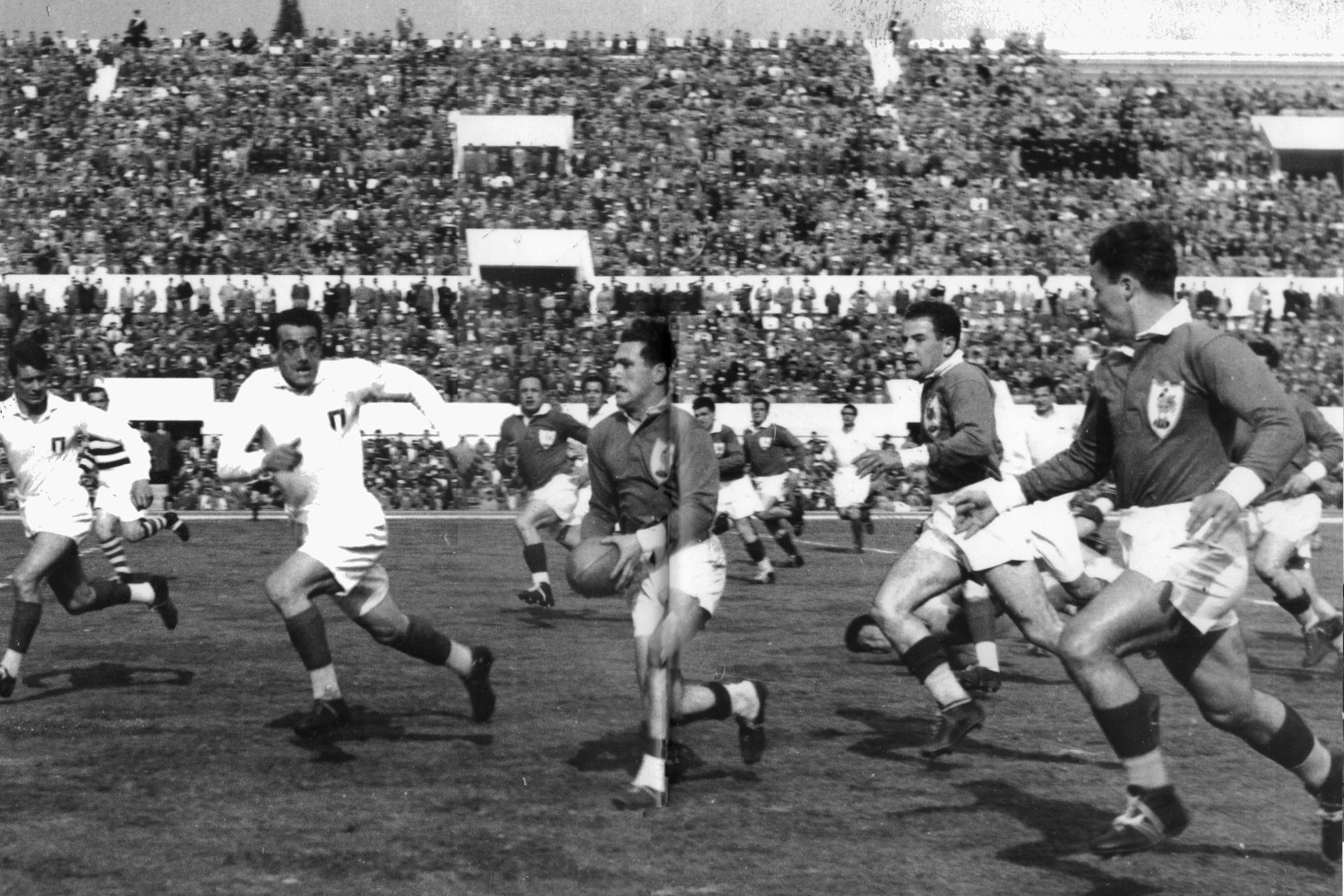
Final of the 1954 rugby union European Cup Italy v France

The new stadium was a 33,500 square-metre concrete structure, clad with travertine. It was composed of two parallel stands of approximately 140 metres each, the Tevere Grandstand (Italian: Tribuna Tevere) on the eastern side and the Monte Mario Grandstand (Italian: Tribuna Monte Mario) on the western side. The northern and southern stands, (respectively, in Italian, Curva Nord and Curva Sud) were shaped as two hemicycles with a radius of 95 metres. The athletics track was 507 metres long. The stadium was 319 metres long and 189 wide. The height from the pitch to the top of the grandstands was about 18 metres, however the top of the grandstand were only 13 metres above surface level, with the pitch about 4.5 metres below surface level. The sinking of the pitch was done to prevent the stadium from dominating the Foro Italico's skyline, and to match with other buildings.

Visitors could access the stadium through ten gates, two for each hemycicle stand and three for each straight stand. The whole stadium was unroofed except the Monte Mario Grandstand. Atop the grandstand was an 80-meter long steel structure composed off 40 2-meter wide cubicles, for use by radio and TV commentators. There was also a press room, equipped with 54 phone booths, and teletype, wirephoto and telegraph facilities. 572 seats were reserved for the press.

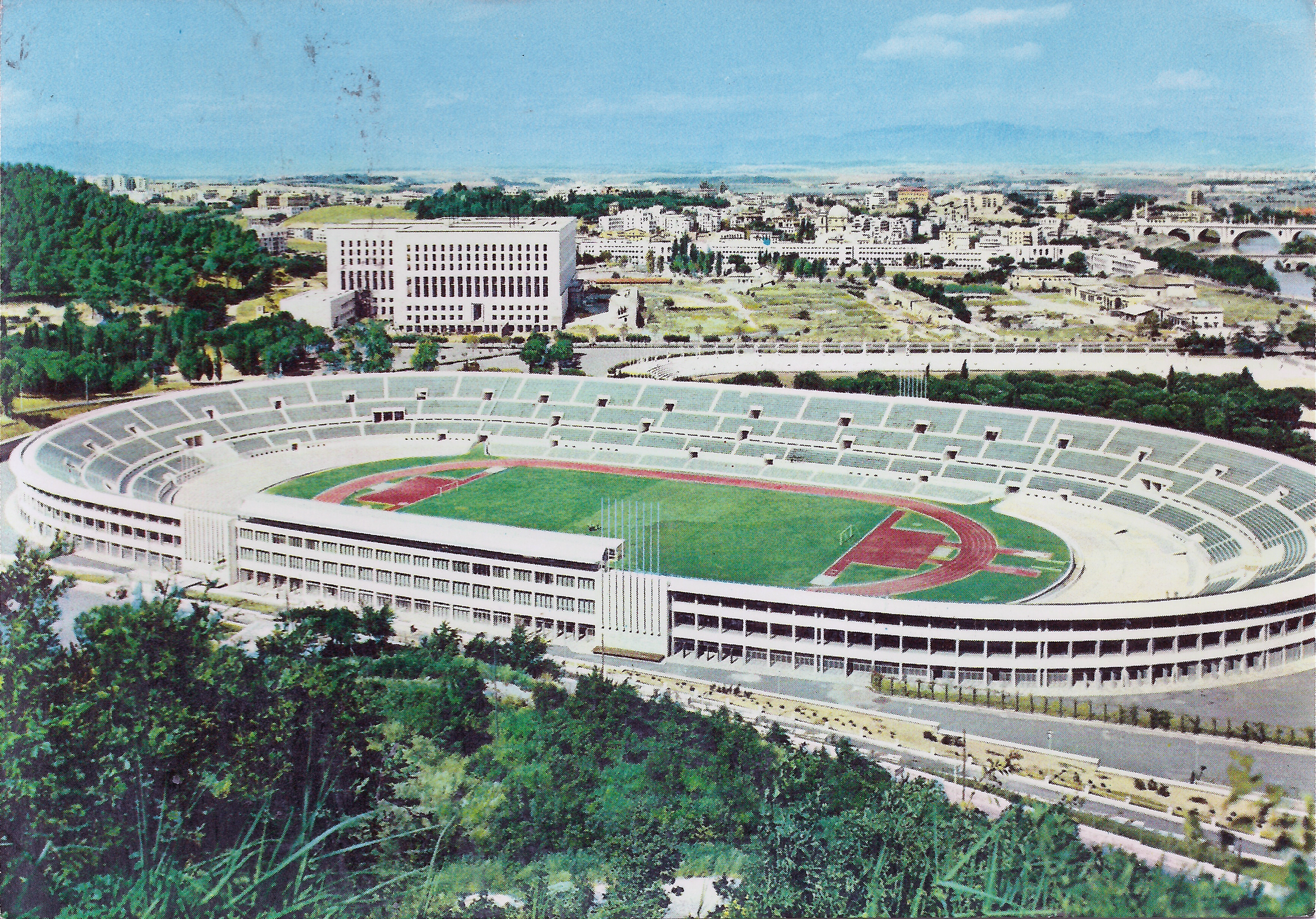
The Olimpico on a 1950s colour postcard

The Stadio dei Centomila (Stadium of the 100,000), named after its expected capacity, was officially opened on 17 May 1953 by the President of Italy, Luigi Einaudi. An International Cup's football match between Italy and Hungary was held, as well as the finish line of the sixth stage (from Naples to Rome) of the Giro d'Italia. Hungary won 3–0, with a goal by Nándor Hidegkuti, the first ever scorer in the stadium, and two goals from Ferenc Puskás. The sixth leg of the Giro d'Italia was won by Giuseppe Minardi, with the crowd from the football game watching the finish line.

The following Sunday, the stadium hosted its first ever club football match, a Serie A game between SS Lazio and Juventus FC, won by Juventus 1–0 with a goal from Pasquale Vivolo. The next matchday, AS Roma debuted in the stadium, with a draw 0–0 against SPAL.

In 1954, Italy hosted the fifth Rugby Union European Cup. The stadium hosted the final between Italy and France. France won 39–12 in front of an estimated crowd of 25,000.

=== 1960 Olympics ===
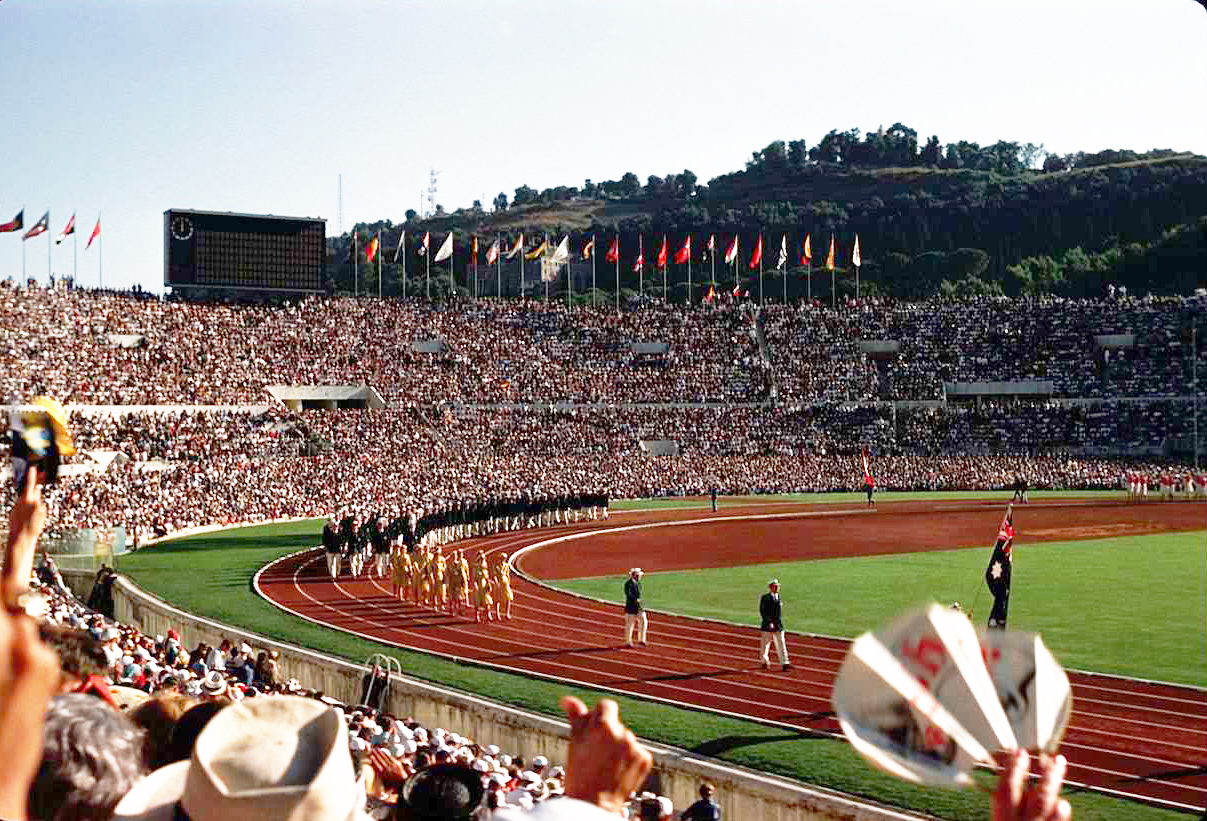
Opening Ceremony of the 1960 Olympic Games

In 1955, the International Olympic Committee appointed Rome the host city of the 17th Summer Olympics, to be held in 1960. The decision made works to make the stadium compliant for the event more urgent. By this point, the name 'Dei Centomila' was being slowly replaced by 'Olimpico'. Works were relatively minimal due to the venue's young age. Reserved press seats were raised from 572 to 1,126, and four lighting towers were constructed for evening events. Two electronic scoreboards were also installed atop of the northern and southern stands, starting operation on 18 October 1959 with an association football league match between SS Lazio and AS Roma, the two tenant clubs of the venue, won 3–0 by the latter. An autonomous power plant able to produce 375,000 watts was installed.

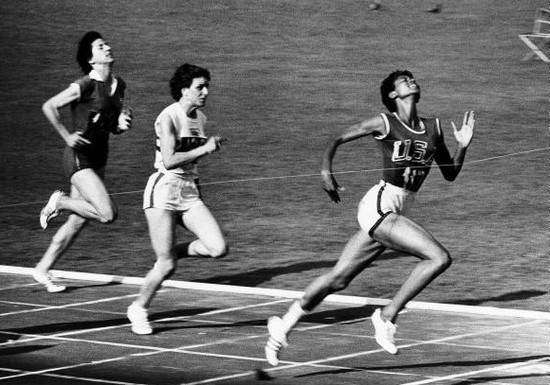
Wilma Rudolph wins the 100 metres sprint race; Giusy Leone of Italy came in third.

On 25 August 1960, the stadium hosted the opening ceremony of the 17th Summer Olympics. Three gold medals were won by American sprinter Wilma Rudolph, in the 100 metres, an Olympic record at the time, 200 metres, with a world record in the semi-final heat, and 4 × 100 relay, also with a world record and together with her team mates Martha Hudson, Lucinda Williams and Barbara Jones.

Other events in track-and-field at the stadium included the 400 metres, won with a world record by American Otis Davis, the 1500 metres, won by Australian Herb Elliott, the men's 4×100 relay, won by the Unified German Team, consisting of Bernd Cullmann, Armin Hary, Walter Mahlendorf and Martin Lauer, and the women's 800 meters, won by Soviet Lyudmila Shevtsova, equalling her previous world record.

=== After the Olympics ===
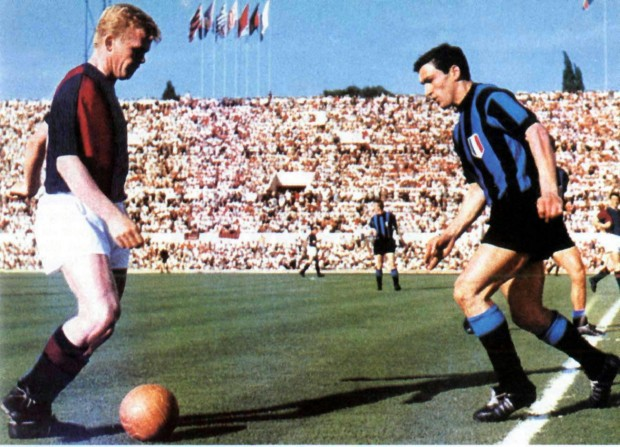
Helmut Haller and Tarcisio Burgnich during the scudetto play-off between Bologna and Inter

After the 1960 Olympic Games, the Olimpico was used primarily as an association football venue. In addition to hosting the home games of SS Lazio and AS Roma, the stadium saw the first (and, to date, only) play-off for the scudetto in 1963–64; Bologna FC and FC Inter had ended the Italian League season level on points, and a tie-breaker was needed to determine the title. Bologna won their seventh (and most recent) Scudetto, defeating Inter 2–0 with an own goal by Giacinto Facchetti and a goal by Harald Nielsen.

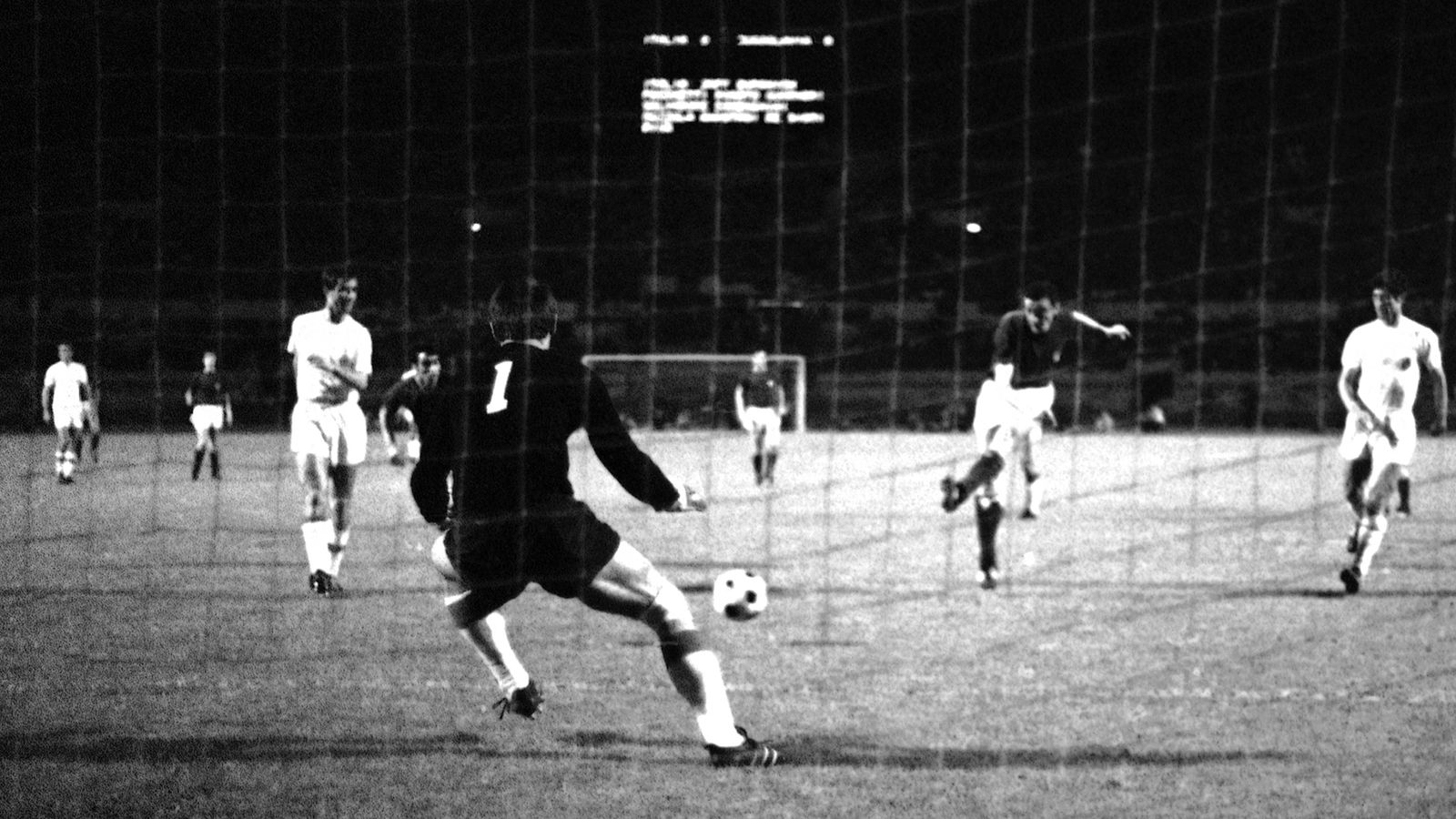
Luigi Riva scores against Yugoslav goalkeeper Ilija Pantelić in a replay of the Euro 1968 final

In 1960, UEFA established the European Championship. The host of the finals would be chosen from the four countries who reached the semi-finals. Italy did not reach that stage in the first two editions, but in 1968 it reached the "Final Four" with England, Yugoslavia and the Soviet Union and was chosen by UEFA to host the final tournament. Florence and Naples hosted the semi-finals and the Olimpico hosted the title game, which saw the home team facing Yugoslavia. For the first (and only) time in the history of the tournament, a replay was necessary; on 8 June 1968 the match ended 1–1, with a goal by Dragan Džajić equalled in the final minutes by the Italian Angelo Domenghini. Italy defeated Yugoslavia 2–0 two days later, with goals by Luigi Riva and Pietro Anastasi, and became the European champions.

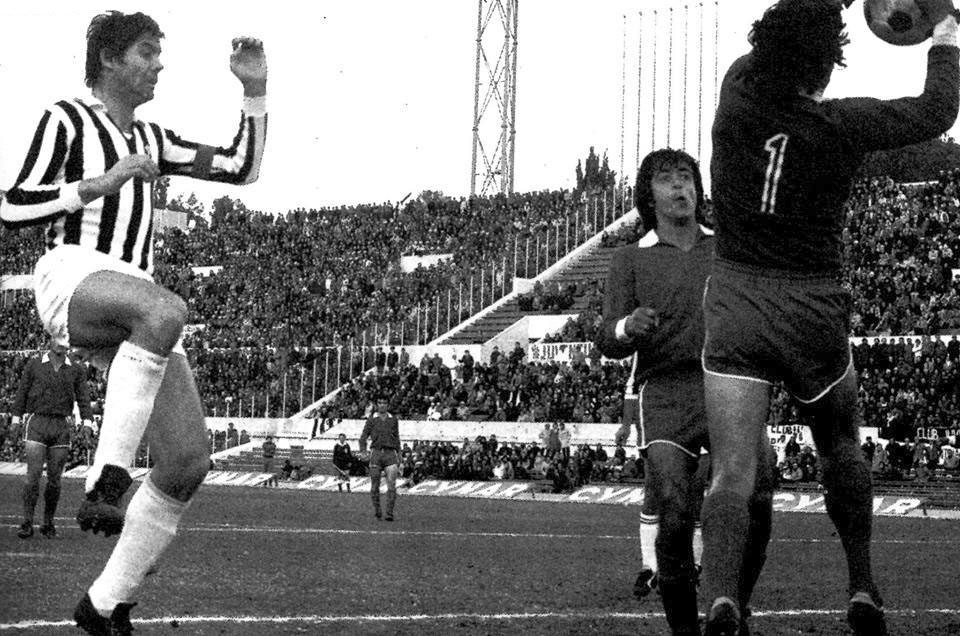
Juventus captain Sandro Salvadore (left) in action against Independiente in 1973

Juventus FC, runner-up in the 1972–73 European Cup, was invited to represent UEFA in the 1973 Intercontinental Cup against the Argentine CA Independiente after European champions AFC Ajax refused to participate in the tournament. Since both teams' schedules were too full for a two-leg match, the Italian football federation suggested a one-off game at the neutral Olimpico; both clubs agreed.

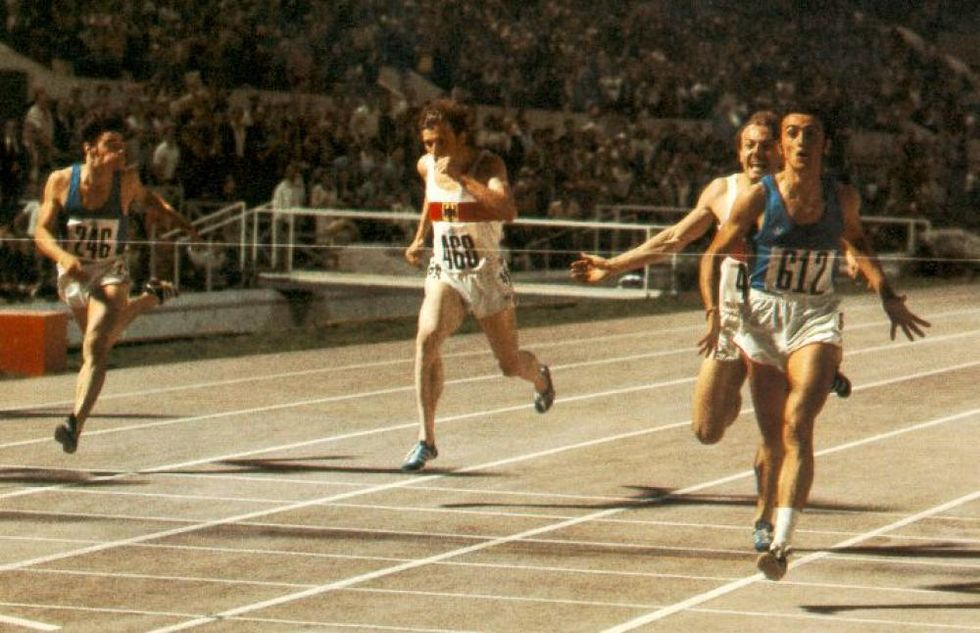
Pietro Mennea wins the 200-metre dash at the 1974 European Championships.

On 28 November 1973, before 22,000 spectators, Independiente won 1–0 with a goal by Ricardo Bochini. In 1974, the stadium hosted the 11th European Athletics Championships. The event showcased two world-class Italian athletes: sprinter Pietro Mennea (winner of the 200 metres and runner-up in the 100 metres and the 4×100 relay) and high-jumper Sara Simeoni, bronze medalist in the high jump at 1.89 metres.

The Olimpico was chosen in 1975 for the 8th University Games, originally awarded to Belgrade (which was unable to host the games because of financial issues in Yugoslavia in late 1974). Since there was no time to organize a full multi-sport games, the Rome edition consisted only of track-and-field events. Pietro Mennea was again amongst the leading athletes, winning the 100 and 200 metres, and Franco Fava won the 5000- and 10,000-metre runs.

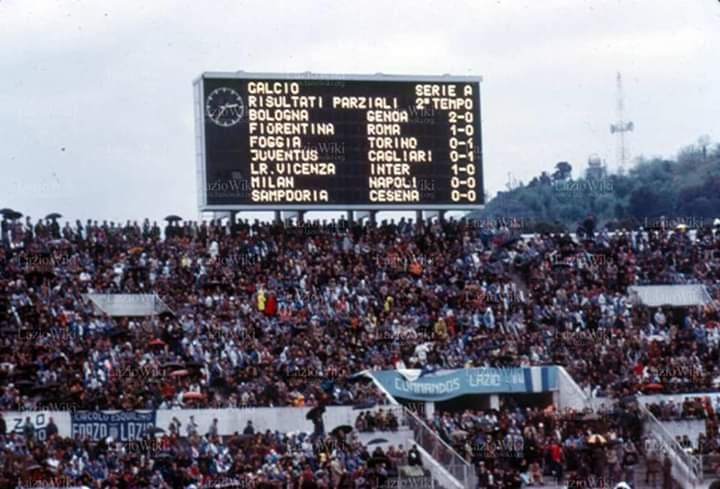
The 1959 scoreboard atop the Southern Stand in April 1974

In 1977, Rome hosted its first European Cup final. The match was between Borussia Mönchengladbach and Liverpool FC, both seeking their first-ever title. Liverpool won 3–1, with one goal each by Terry McDermott, Tommy Smith and Phil Neal, and the Dane Allan Simonsen scored a temporary equaliser for the German team. At the Olimpico, Liverpool was the second English and the third British side to be crowned European champion.

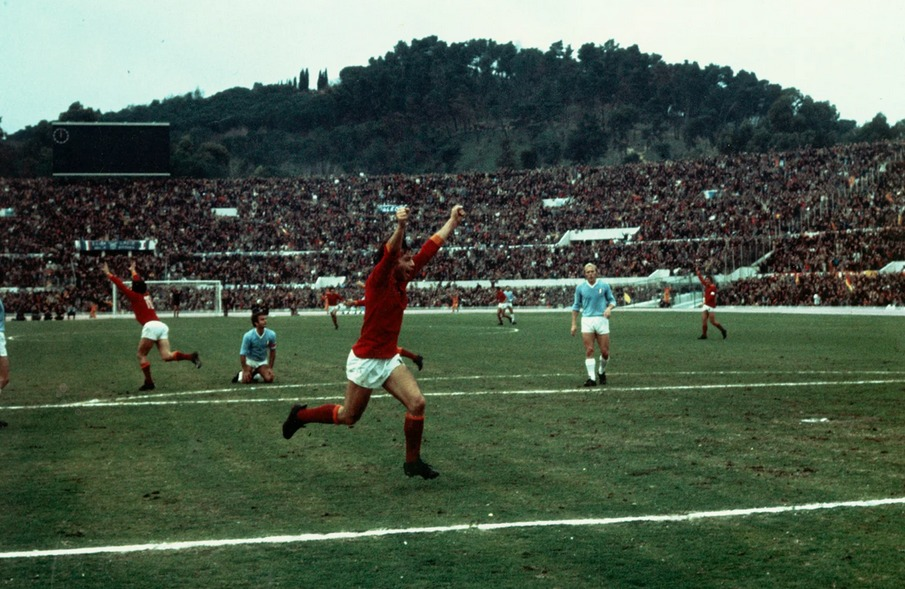
Giancarlo De Sisti celebrates after scoring the winning goal in the 1974–75 Roma v. Lazio derby

The 1980 edition of the European Championship was an eight-team tournament whose host country was chosen by UEFA before the qualifying round. Italy hosted the first edition of the renewed competition. The Olimpico held the opening ceremony, which featured an exhibition of calcio storico fiorentino (a medieval form of association football played in Florence) followed by the first game between European champions Czechoslovakia and West Germany; Germany won 1–0, with a goal by Karl-Heinz Rummenigge. Again Czechoslovakia featured in the stadium during the group stage, with a win 3–1 over Greece. Italy drew 0–0 against Belgium, preventing the home side from reaching the final. The fourth game at the Olimpico was the championship final on 22 June 1980, when Belgium faced West Germany. Germany won the match 2–1, with a double by Horst Hrubesch; the Belgian goal was scored by René Vandereycken.

The 1980s were the last decade of the roofless Olimpico. It hosted the third IAAF World Cup in 1981 (an international track-and-field event with national and continental teams) and the 1987 second World Championships in Athletics, when American sprinter Carl Lewis beat his 100-metre 9.93-second world record and Stefka Kostadinova set a record in the women's high jump with 2.09 metres (6 ft 10 in); the latter remains amongst the longest-lasting sports records.

Mid-way between the athletics events was the 1984 European Cup final, well-attended since AS Roma was one of the contestants for the title; the other was Liverpool, the winners at the same venue in 1977. The game, played on 30 May 1984 before 69,000 spectators, was the first European Cup final decided by a penalty shootout. After extra time, the match was still level at 1–1 with goals by Phil Neal and Roberto Pruzzo. Liverpool won the shootout 4–2 for their fourth European Cup.

One week before the final, FIFA chose Italy to host the 14th World Cup in 1990. In the bid submitted by the Italian football federation to FIFA, Rome was proposed for the tournament's final.

=== 1990 World Cup renovation ===
In the five years after Italy was chosen to be the World Cup host, the future of Rome's stadiums sparked a mostly-political dispute. The three main proposals were the expansion of Stadio Flaminio, a new stadium in south-western Rome near EUR, or renovation of the Olimpico. The Stadio Flaminio expansion was quickly dropped due to lack of space, and a new stadium would have taken too long; architects opposed hasty construction and poor urban planning. The only feasible proposal was to renovate the Olimpico, and the Italian National Olympic Committee (CONI) hired architects Vitellozzi (designer of the 1953 stadium) and Clerici and engineers Teresi and Michetti. The plan, presented in early 1987, consisted of a covered stadium with a capacity of 85,825 via a 6-metre (20 ft) rise of the Tevere and Monte Mario grandstands and rebuilding the Northern and Southern stands. The light towers would be replaced by a light plant integrated into the roof frame. The estimated cost of the renovation was ₤35–40 billion (€17.5–20 million).

CONI appointed the joint venture CO.GE.FAR. as the general contractor ready to begin work. In November 1987, three Italian environmental organizations (Italia Nostra, Legambiente and WWF Italia) filed an appeal in Lazio's Administrative Regional Court, saying the planned 40-metre (130 ft) roof pillars would cause landscape and environmental damage. In January 1988 the Court upheld the appeal and ordered the works to stop.

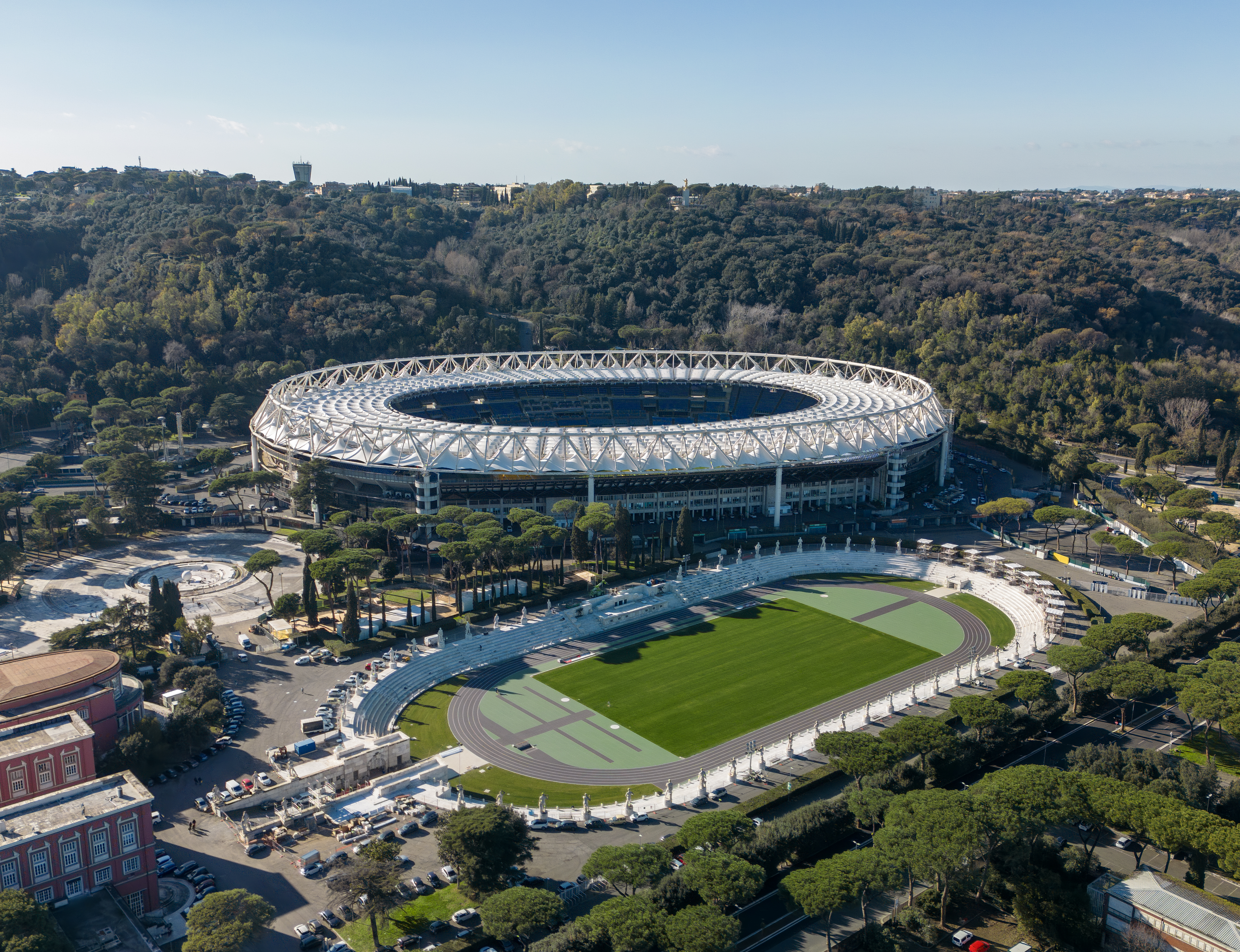
Aerial view of the roofed Olimpico

Fearing other court appeals, CONI stopped work on the Olimpico. New legal issues slowed the work; the Southern Stand worksite was seized by the court, which suspected non-compliance with work-safety rules. The Ministry of Culture demanded a new project which took into account issues raised by the environmental organizations. The architects lowered the pillars and created helical stairs inside each to reach the highest stands, and the appeal was rescinded. Work resumed with a little over 18 months before the World Cup.

Work continued slowly over the following months, as SS Lazio and AS Roma were still playing there during the 1988–89 season. At the end of the season, both clubs moved for a year to neighbouring Stadio Flaminio. Their final match at the old stadium was the 30th match day derby, which ended goalless before 41,633 spectators; ticket revenue was about ₤1.15 million (about €590,000).

The renovated stadium, completed in April 1990, seated 85,000 and was released to FIFA at the end of May (two weeks late and ten days before the start of the World Cup). Little was left of the old Olimpico except a portion of the façade of the Tevere grandstand. The northern and southern stands were rebuilt 9 metres (30 ft) closer to the short sides of the pitch and the Monte Mario grandstand was extended, replacing the press centre built for the 1987 World Championships in Athletics.

The roof consists of a 13-metre-high (43 ft) outer steel ring which is 29 metres (95 ft) above the ground on 12 steel pillars and four external concrete stair blocks which are also pillars; radial bearing and stabilizing cables hold an inner steel ring. The roof itself is a Teflon and fiberglass membrane which is hung from the 88 steel radial cables linking the external and internal rings. The roof, which cost approximately ₤160 billion (about €80,000,000), was designed by the Majowecki engineering firm in Bologna.

A later analysis determined that the total cost for the Olimpico renovation was about ₤450 billion (€225,000,000). According to experts appointed by judges at Rome's Court of Appeals, the figure was tainted by possible irregularities in the tender; the contract was awarded to the provider with the highest bid.

=== Italia '90 and post-World Cup ===
During the 1990 World Cup, the Olimpico hosted six games in the group and the knockout stages. Italy won three group-stage matches, against Austria, the United States, and Czechoslovakia. The "Azzurri" then played at the Olimpico in the round of 16, defeating Uruguay 2–0 and Ireland in the quarter-final before losing to Argentina in the semi-final in Naples.

In the 8 July 1990 final at the Olimpico, West Germany defeated Argentina with an Andreas Brehme penalty kick with six minutes remaining. The Olimpico was the first venue to see a player sent off during a World Cup final; red cards were issued to Argentine players Pedro Monzón and Gustavo Dezotti.

At the end of its first season at the renovated Olimpico, AS Roma reached the 1990–91 UEFA Cup final (an Italian derby against Inter). At the time, the UEFA Cup was the only European competition with a two-leg final. Inter won the first leg, 2–0, at the San Siro in Milan. AS Roma won 1–0 at the Olimpico before a crowd of 70,900, but Inter won the cup 2–1 on aggregate. Five of the German players who had won the World Cup the year before on the same pitch played in the UEFA Cup final: Andreas Brehme, Lothar Matthäus and Jürgen Klinsmann for Inter, and Thomas Berthold and Rudi Völler for AS Roma.

In September 1995 the Olimpico hosted the opening and closing ceremonies of the First Military World Games and the games' track-and-field events. It hosted the Italian rugby union team later that year for the third time (and the first since 1986), against world champions South Africa. In addition to the 1954 European Cup final, Italy played at the Olimpico in 1986, when the team drew 15–15 against England XV in front of 40,000 spectators. Although the Stadio Flaminio was their usual venue in Rome, Italy played at the Olimpico because the match was a fundraiser for children's aid organizations which wanted a larger stadium. South Africa won their first match after their World Cup victory 40–21, after Italy led 21–17 with 15 minutes left. Attendance was about 40,000, and ticket prices were between 5,000 and 30,000 lire (€2.5–15).

Rome hosted the European Cup (now the UEFA Champions League) final for the third time several months later, with the Italian club Juventus FC facing the Dutch side AFC Ajax. The match ended in a 1–1 draw, with goals by Fabrizio Ravanelli and Jari Litmanen, necessitating a tie-breaker from the penalty spot. Juventus won the shootout 4–2 (as Liverpool had in 1984) for their second European championship.

In the new millennium, the issue of the stadium's ownership was resolved. The Olimpico had been owned since 1976 by the Ministry of Finance (later the Ministry of Economy and Finance), which established Coni Servizi (a government agency to manage public sports venues) in 2002. Subsequently, the Ministry transferred to the newborn entity the ownership of the whole Foro Italico on 3 February 2004. Coni Servizi, renamed Sport e Salute in 2019, is the owner of the stadium.

=== 2007–2008 renovation ===
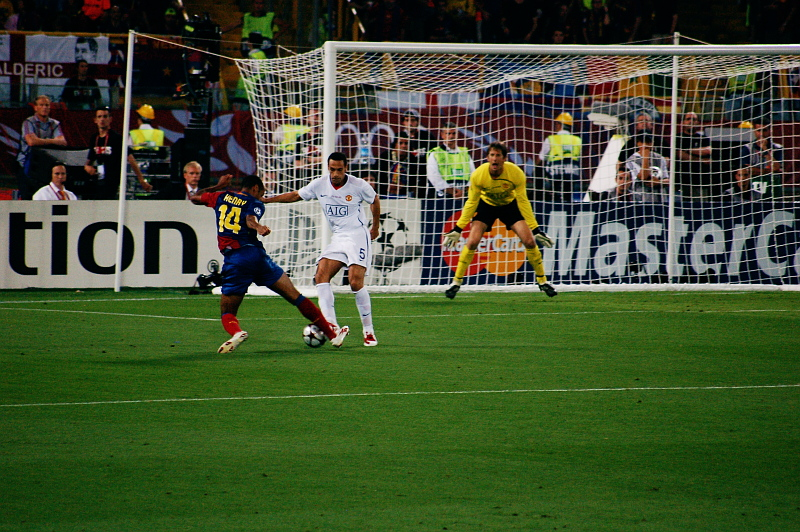
2009 Champions League final: Henry faces Rio Ferdinand, while goalkeeper Edwin van der Sar watches.

In October 2006, Rome was chosen to host the 2009 Champions League final. Rome's fourth selection spurred CONI to speed up the Olimpico's planned maintenance and renovation, 16 years after the last project.

Although the stadium's shape and structure were unaffected, changes were made to the Authority Room in the Monte Mario grandstand and more-comfortable seats were installed: 48 centimetres (19 in) wide in the Northern and Southern stands, 50 centimetres (20 in) in the Tevere grandstand and 54 centimetres (21 in) in the hospitality area of the Monte Mario grandstand). VIP areas were installed in the Monte Mario grandstand. The renovation reduced the Olimpico's capacity by about 5,000 seats. A 600-square-metre (6,500 sq ft) press room was built, and the locker-room area was doubled. Two brand new scoreboards were also installed atop of The Northern- and Southern-stand scoreboards were replaced by digital, high-definition versions; the benches were moved slightly back from the pitch, and the plexiglas barriers between the stands and the pitch were partially removed. The Olimpico now had a capacity of 70,634, making it Italy's second-largest stadium (after the San Siro in Milan).

The 2009 Champions League final was held on 27 May 2009 between FC Barcelona and Manchester United. Barcelona won the game 2–0 before 62,467 spectators, with goals by Samuel Eto'o and Lionel Messi. The single-leg Coppa Italia final has been played at the Olimpico since 2008 except for 2021, when it was played in Mapei Stadium - Città del Tricolore in Reggio Emilia because of the COVID-19 pandemic.

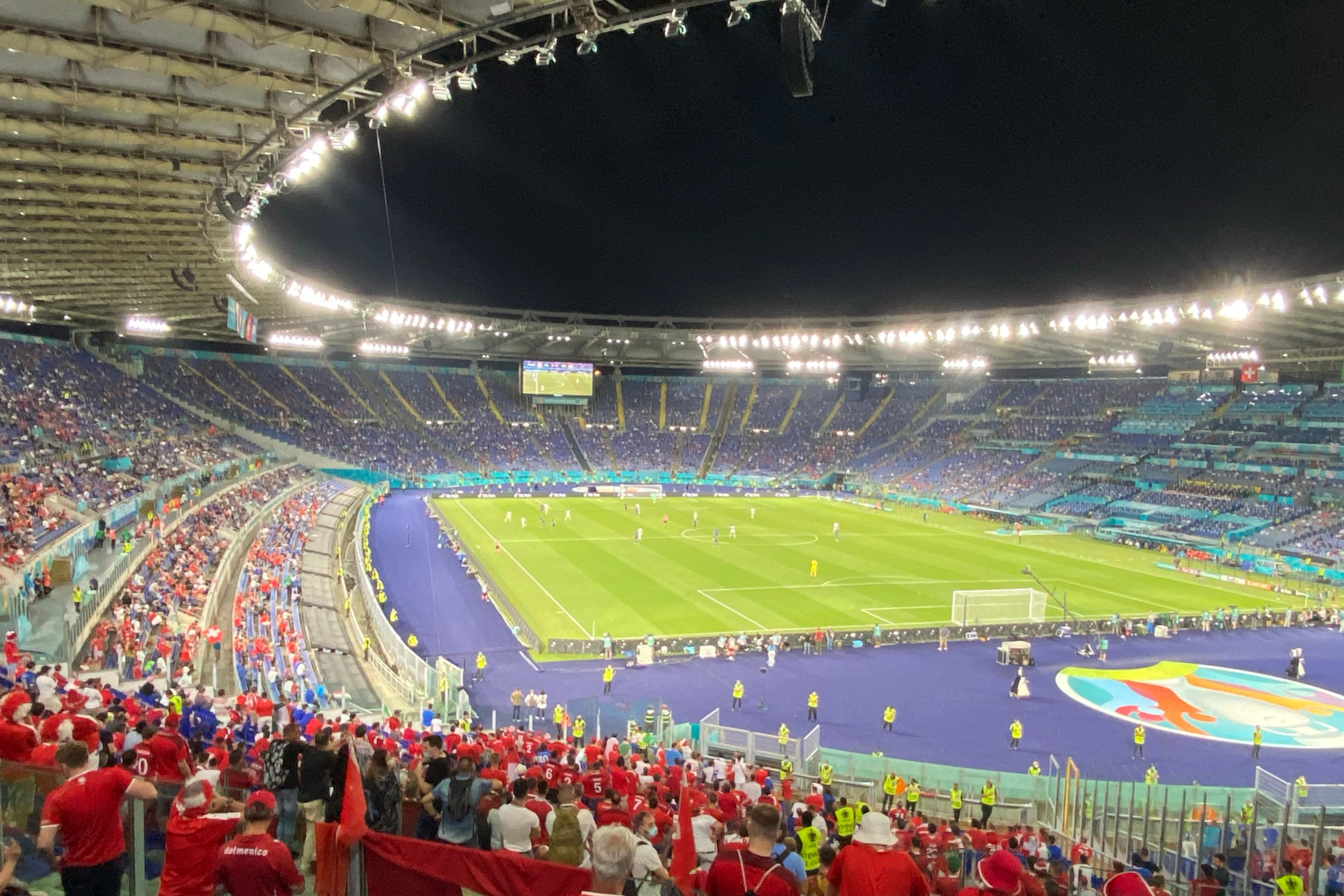
The Olimpico in June 2021, hosting the Italy vs. Switzerland game of UEFA Euro 2020

To celebrate the 60th anniversary of the European Championship, UEFA said that the 2020 edition would have no host country and the tournament would be played in 11 UEFA-member cities. Rome hosted three group stage matches (including the opener) and a quarter-final game.

Due to the COVID-19 pandemic, the tournament was postponed until June and July 2021. The 11 June 2021 opening ceremony at the Olimpico was followed by a game between Italy and Turkey. The Azzurri won 3–0 before 16,000 spectators, a smaller crowd for public-health reasons. After their first win, Italy defeated Switzerland 3–0 and Wales 1–0. The fourth Olimpico match was the quarter-final between Ukraine and England; England won 4–0, with goals by Jordan Henderson and Harry Maguire and a double by Harry Kane.

The European Athletic Association chose Rome in August 2022 for the June 2024 26th European Athletics Championships, 50 years after the Olimpico last hosted the event. On 22 March 2023, the Women's Champions League quarter-final between AS Roma and FC Barcelona was played before a crowd of 39,459, setting an attendance record for a women's association football match in Italy. The Italy national football team had played 53 matches at the Olimpico in 70 years by December 2023, the most recent of which was a 5–2 win in the EURO 2024 qualifying game against North Macedonia.

== Other recurring sports events ==
=== Golden Gala ===
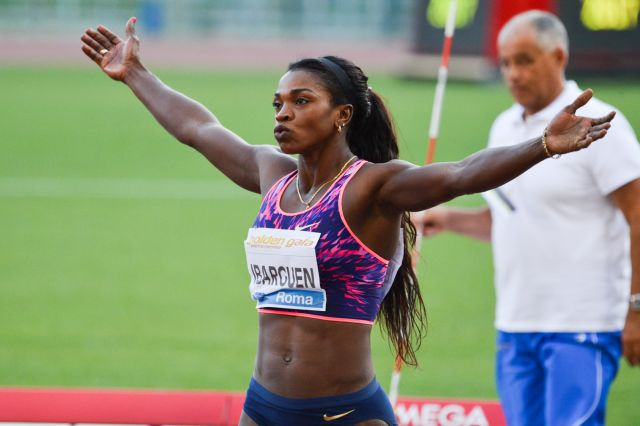
Colombian multiathlete Caterine Ibargüen at the 2017 Golden Gala

Italian Athletics Federation president Primo Nebiolo created the Golden Gala, a recurring summer athletics event at the Olimpico, in 1980. The event was held in the middle of a heated political debate at the international level, because several domestic Olympic boards were divided about whether to follow the U.S. Olympic Committee in their boycott of the 1980 Moscow Olympics because of Soviet involvement in the Afghan war Aware of those political controversies, Nebiolo said that his event should not be seen as an "alternative Olympiad", although it featured world-class athletes from both of the era's geopolitical blocks.

The first Golden Gala took place on 5 August 1980, a few days after the closing of the Soviet Olympics, and featured many first-class Italian athletes prevented from going to Moscow because of their status as enlisted in the armed forces; this included Mariano Scartezzini, a Guardia di Finanza constable who won the 3000-metre steeplechase and set an Italian record. Amongst the civilian athletes who also competed in Moscow was Pietro Mennea, who won the 200-metre dash with a faster time than his gold-medal final in the Soviet Union few days before. About 74,000 spectators attended the event, of whom 54,000 paid. The difference in attendance was due to the fact that several hours into the event, its organizers opened the gates of the Olimpico's two curved stands to those without tickets.

The Golden Gala did not take place in 1981 because of the IAAF World Cup. It returned in 1982, and has been part of the international calendar ever since. The event was not held at the Olimpico early in the stadium's renovation for the 1990 World Cup, and was held in Florence and Verona. The Golden Gala was renamed in 2013 for Pietro Mennea, who died in March of that year. In addition to being a key Italian athletics event, the Golden Gala has been part of the Diamond League (the World Athletics world tour) since 2010.

=== Six Nations Championship and rugby union ===
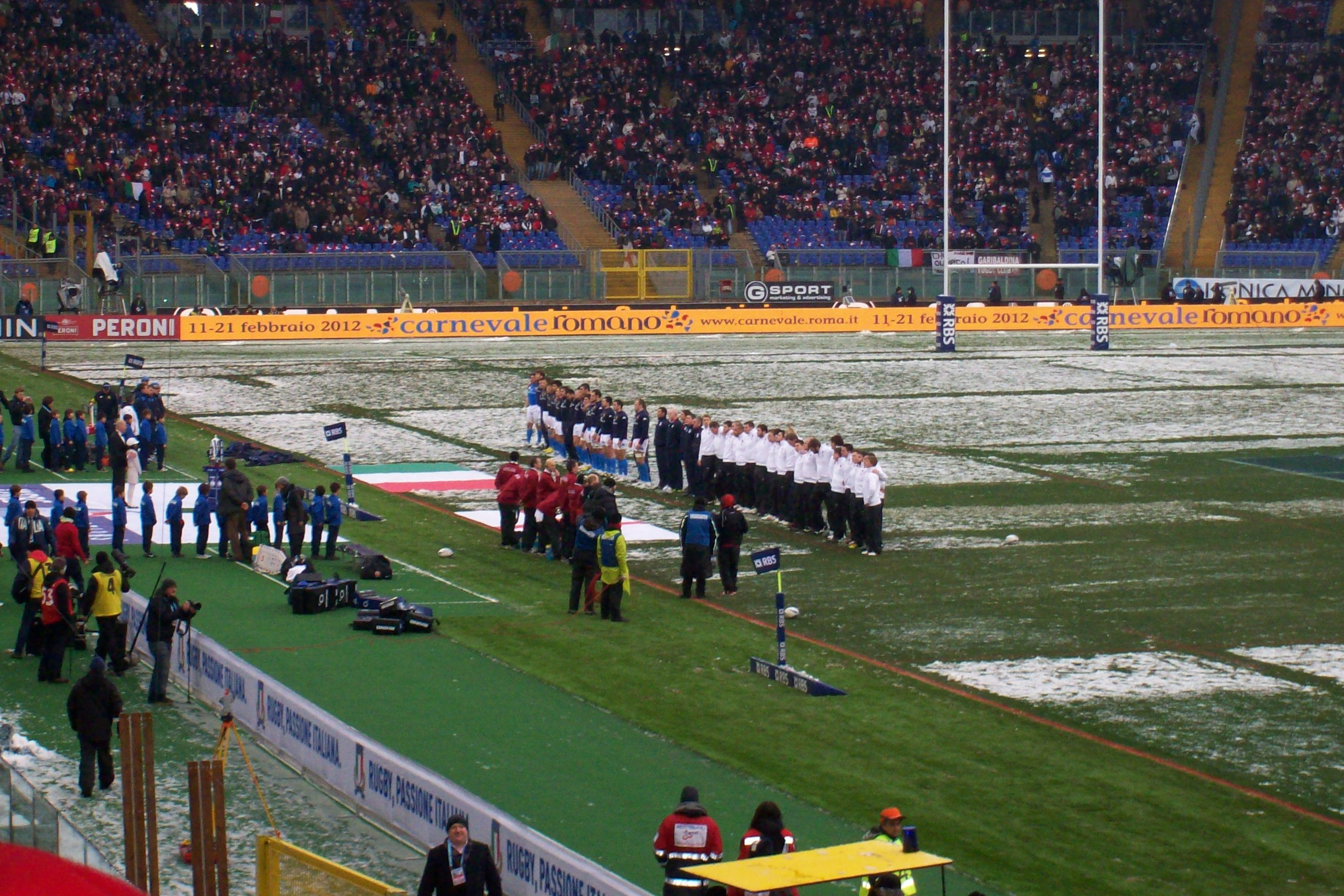
The Olimpico's frozen pitch before the 2012 Six Nations match against England

Italy played its Six Nations Championship home matches at Stadio Flaminio for 11 seasons after 2000, a 24,000-seat city-owned venue built for the football tournament of the 1960 Olympics across the Tiber a few hundred metres from the Olimpico. However, it did not meet Six Nations Rugby's stadium guidelines. The Italian Rugby Federation first planned to expand Stadio Flaminio to 40,000 seats, using the Olimpico in 2012 as temporary venue.

The renovation never began, however; Pier Luigi Nervi's heirs received the Flaminio's legalintellectual property rights, giving them veto power over any changes. The Italian Rugby Federation then decided to return the Flaminio's management rights to Roma Capitale and request permanent use of the Olimpico.

The stadium first hosted the Six Nations Championship on 11 February 2012 during an unusual icy weekend, on a pitch frozen after snow fell on Rome the day before. England won, 19–15, after trailing for almost one hour.

By the end of the 2023 Six Nations tournament, 39 test matches had been played by Italy in the venue since their first in 1954. In addition to the 30 in the 12 tournament seasons played so far, Italy played four matches at the Olimpico before their admission to the Six Nations and five more after 2000. Apart from the Six Nations sides, the most frequent guests at the Olimpico are New Zealand's All Blacks, whom have played four test matches there.

== Music events ==
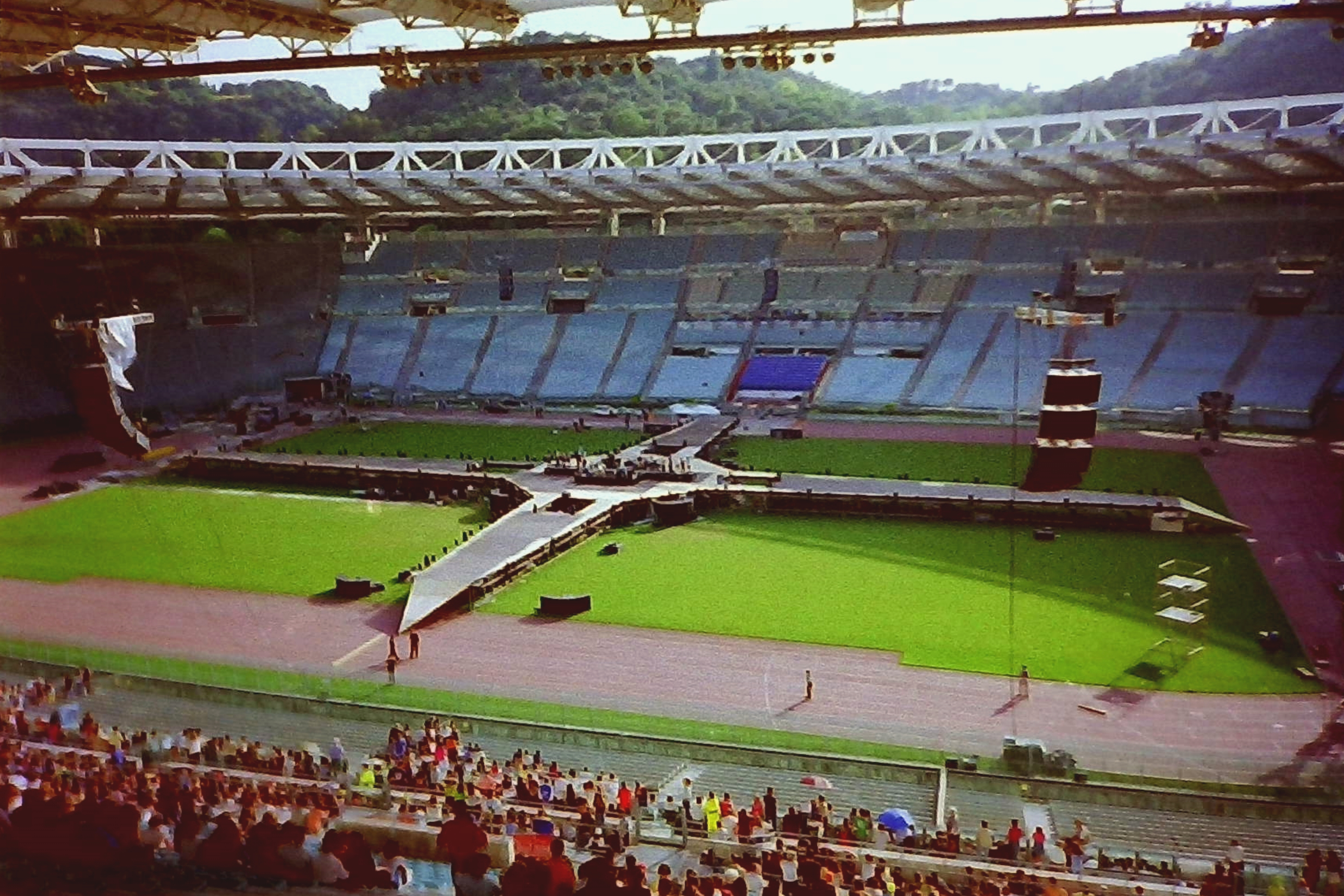
Concert stage for 1998 Claudio Baglioni's Da me a te tour

With its roof, the Olimpico became a suitable venue for concerts. Its first performers were Miles Davis and Pat Metheny in July 1991, who played to a crowd estimated at 20,000. The first Italian artist at the Olimpico was Zucchero Fornaciari in June 1993 during his l'Urlo tour, who played to an audience of 10,000.

The record attendance for musical events is held by Claudio Baglioni during his Da me a te tour. On 6 June 1998, the first of Baglioni's two concerts in Rome sold 82,000 tickets; 8,000 people were also admitted free of charge. The record was possible because CONI president Mario Pescante allowed Baglioni to install a 112-metre-long (367 ft), 72-metre-wide (236 ft) stage on the pitch, and CONI had planned to replace the turf soon after the concert. The audience did not sit only in the southern stand, as usual, but throughout the stadium.

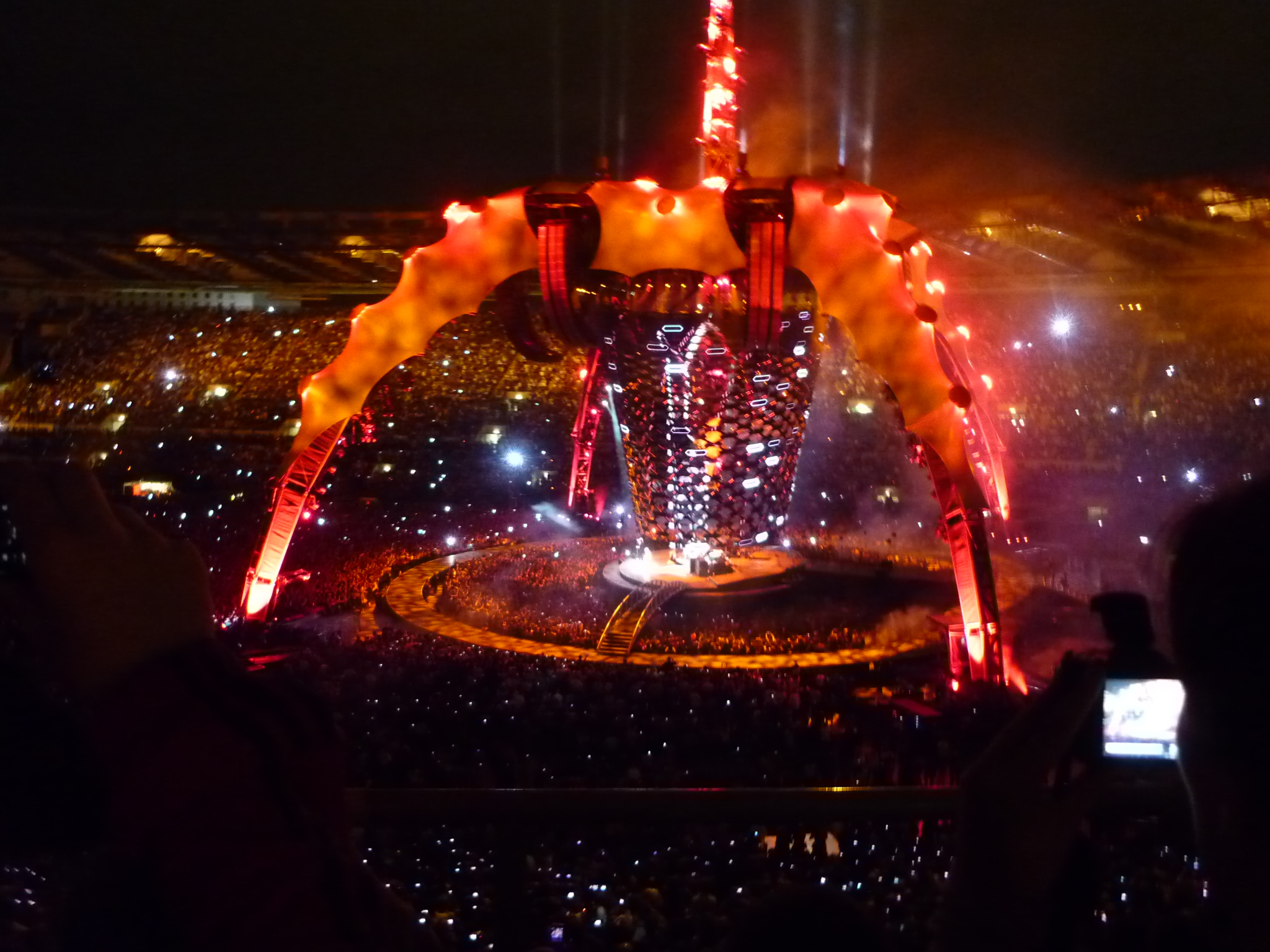
U2 at the Olimpico during their 2010 360° Tour

The Olimpico's most-frequent performer is Italian singer-songwriter Vasco Rossi, with 23 concerts between 1991 and 2023. Luciano Ligabue performed 13 times at the stadium between 1996 and 2023.

The record number of concerts at the Olimpico by non-Italian acts was held in 2023 by the British group Depeche Mode, that performed there five times between 2006 and 2023; their most recent appearances were during their Global Spirit and Memento Mori World Tours. The Irish band U2 have played four concerts at the stadium since 2005, most recently as part of their 2017 Joshua Tree Tour. David Bowie and Tina Turner performed at 1996 Rome's Live Rock Festival in the Olimpico's southern stand, and R.E.M. appeared during the band's 2005 Around the Sun Tour.

== Sports events ==
=== Competitions ===
- 1960 Summer Olympics
- UEFA Euro 1968
- 1974 European Athletics Championships
- 1975 Summer Universiade
- UEFA Euro 1980
- 1981 IAAF World Cup
- 1987 World Championships in Athletics
- 1990 FIFA World Cup
- 1995 Military World Games
- 2001 Summer Deaflympics
- Six Nations Championship
- UEFA Euro 2020
- 2024 European Athletics Championships

=== Matches ===
- UEFA Euro 1968 final (Italy vs. Yugoslavia 2–0)
- 1973 Intercontinental Cup (Juventus FC vs. CA Independiente 0–1)
- 1977 European Cup final (Liverpool F.C. vs. Borussia Mönchengladbach 3–1)
- UEFA Euro 1980 final (West Germany vs. Belgium 2–1)
- 1984 European Cup Final (Liverpool F.C. vs. AS Roma 5–3 after penalty shootout)
- 1990 FIFA World Cup Final (West Germany vs. Argentina 1–0)
- 1991 UEFA Cup final (2nd leg, AS Roma vs. Inter 1–0)
- 1996 UEFA Champions League final (Juventus FC vs. AFC Ajax 5–3 after penalty shootout)
- 2009 UEFA Champions League final (FC Barcelona vs. Manchester United 2–0)
- 2013 Six Nations match Italy vs. France 23–18 (first victory against France in the championship)
- 2013 Six Nations match Italy vs. Ireland 22–15 (first victory against Ireland in the championship)
- 2026 Six Nations match Italy vs. England 23-18 (first victory against England in the championship, as well as their first victory against England in test rugby union)

== Attendance ==
The table below reports the average season attendance at league matches held at the Stadio Olimpico for Lazio and Roma. The stadium's attendance record is 78,886, set on 12 May 1974 for the 29th matchday of the 1973–74 Serie A between Lazio and Foggia. The home side won 1-0 for their first scudetto, one matchday in advance. SS Lazio's season-ticket holders for that season were 18,392; paying spectators for that matchday numbered 60,494, for a total attendance of 78,886.

Season	Roma	Lazio
1961–62	30,176	20,730
1962–63	37,248	17,523
1963–64	31,269	24,979
1964–65	30,176	20,730
1965–66	28,897	21,486
1966–67	35,375	21,680
1967–68	35,902	15,586
1968–69	46,323	21,935
1969–70	50,625	34,883
1970–71	45,551	37,979
1971–72	47,990	26,132
1972–73	44,310	45,591
1973–74	47,597	49,833
1974–75	53,935	44,846
1975–76	44,607	40,859
1976–77	36,899	37,920
1977–78	40,956	38,786
1978–79	48,768	41,059
1979–80	44,589	31,560
1980–81	51,103	24,148
1981–82	45,289	21,634
1982–83	54,510	34,234

Season	Roma	Lazio
1983–84	52,793	46,908
1984–85	51,421	38,544
1985–86	50,151	25,872
1986–87	49,138	30,945
1987–88	42,755	29,790
1988–89	34,913	32,125
1989–90	N/A (Note: Both teams played at Stadio Flaminio.)	
1990–91	43,570	36,371
1991–92	51,609	39,499
1992–93	50,306	49,105
1993–94	52,615	50,149
1994–95	56,356	48,715
1995–96	53,146	46,326
1996–97	50,557	38,699
1997–98	52,813	46,058
1998–99	54,309	53,184
1999–2000	58,915	51,956
2000–01	63,370	48,498
2001–02	59,402	42,684
2002–03	57,160	44,129
2003–04	55,413	49,341
2004–05	49,631	37,516

Season	Roma	Lazio
2005–06	39,726	27,872
2006–07	38,689	25,048
2007–08	35,982	21,607
2008–09	39,396	34,626
2009–10	40,925	36,154
2010–11	33,952	29,122
2011–12	36,219	32,410
2012–13	40,179	31,992
2013–14	40,436	31,905
2014–15	40,135	34,949
2015–16	35,182	21,025
2016–17	32,638	20,453
2017–18	37,450	30,990
2018–19	38,622	37,191
2019–20	39,397	42,393
2020–21	0 (Note: The whole season was played behind closed doors because of the COVID-19 pandemic.)	
2021–22	41,911	24,110
2022–23	62,043	45,641
2023–24	62,924	42,479

== Notable international association football matches ==
=== UEFA Euro 1968 ===
8 June 1968 3rd place play-off	England	2–0	Soviet Union	Rome
18:45 UTC+2	B. Charlton 39'; Hurst 63'	Report		Stadium: Stadio Olimpico; Attendance: 68,817; Referee: István Zsolt (Hungary)

8 June 1968 Final	Italy	1–1	Yugoslavia	Rome
21:15 UTC+2	Domenghini 80'	Report	Džajić 39'	Stadium: Stadio Olimpico; Attendance: 68,817; Referee: Gottfried Dienst (Switzerland)

10 June 1968 Final (replay)	Italy	2–0	Yugoslavia	Rome
21:15 UTC+2	Riva 12'; Anastasi 31'	Report		Stadium: Stadio Olimpico; Attendance: 32,886; Referee: J. M. Ortiz de Mendíbil (Spain)

=== UEFA Euro 1980 ===
11 June 1980 Group 1	Czechoslovakia	0–1	West Germany	Rome
17:45 UTC+2		Report	Rummenigge 57'	Stadium: Stadio Olimpico; Attendance: 10,500; Referee: Alberto Michelotti (Italy)

14 June 1980 Group 1	Greece	1–3	Czechoslovakia	Rome
20:30 UTC+2	Anastopoulos 14'	Report	Panenka 6'; Vizek 26'; Nehoda 63'	Stadium: Stadio Olimpico; Attendance: 7,614; Referee: Pat Partridge (England)

18 June 1980 Group 2	Italy	0–0	Belgium	Rome
20:30 UTC+2		Report		Stadium: Stadio Olimpico; Attendance: 42,318; Referee: António Garrido (Portugal)

22 June 1980 Final	Belgium	1–2	West Germany	Rome
20:30 UTC+2	Vandereycken 75' (pen.)	Report	Hrubesch 10', 88'	Stadium: Stadio Olimpico; Attendance: 47,860; Referee: Nicolae Rainea (Romania)

=== 1990 FIFA World Cup ===
9 June 1990 Group A	Italy	1–0	Austria	Rome
21:00 UTC+2	Schillaci 78'	Report		Stadium: Stadio Olimpico; Attendance: 73,303; Referee: José R. Wright (Brazil)

14 June 1990 Group A	Italy	1–0	United States	Rome
21:00 UTC+2	Giannini 11'	Report		Stadium: Stadio Olimpico; Attendance: 73,423; Referee: Edgardo Codesal (Mexico)

19 June 1990 Group A	Italy	2–0	Czechoslovakia	Rome
21:00 UTC+2	Schillaci 9'; R. Baggio 78'	Report		Stadium: Stadio Olimpico; Attendance: 73,303; Referee: Joël Quiniou (France)

24 June 1990 Round of 16	Italy	2–0	Uruguay	Rome
21:00 UTC+2	Schillaci 65'; A. Serena 83'	Report		Stadium: Stadio Olimpico; Attendance: 73,303; Referee: George Courtney (England)

30 June 1990 Quarter-finals	Republic of Ireland	0–1	Italy	Rome
21:00 UTC+2		Report	Schillaci 38'	Stadium: Stadio Olimpico; Attendance: 73,303; Referee: Carlos Silva Valente (Portugal)

8 July 1990 Final	West Germany	1–0	Argentina	Rome
20:00 UTC+2	Brehme 85' (pen.)	Report		Stadium: Stadio Olimpico; Attendance: 73,603; Referee: Edgardo Codesal (Mexico)

=== UEFA Euro 2020 ===
11 June 2021 Group A	Turkey	0–3	Italy	Rome
21:00 UTC+2		Report	Demiral 53' (o.g.); Immobile 66'; Insigne 79'	Stadium: Stadio Olimpico; Attendance: 12,916; Referee: Danny Makkelie (Netherlands)

16 June 2021 Group A	Italy	3–0	Switzerland	Rome
21:00 UTC+2	Locatelli 26', 52'; Immobile 89'	Report		Stadium: Stadio Olimpico; Attendance: 12,445; Referee: Sergei Karasev (Russia)

20 June 2021 Group A	Italy	1–0	Wales	Rome
18:00 UTC+2	Pessina 39'	Report		Stadium: Stadio Olimpico; Attendance: 11,541; Referee: Ovidiu Hațegan (Romania)

3 July 2021 Quarter-finals	Ukraine	0–4	England	Rome
21:00 UTC+2		Report	Kane 4', 50'; Maguire 46'; J. Henderson 63'	Stadium: Stadio Olimpico; Attendance: 11,880; Referee: Felix Brych (Germany)

=== UEFA Club Competition Finals ===
Date	Winners	Result	Runners-up	Round	Attendance
25 May 1977	(England) Liverpool	3-1	(West Germany) Borussia Mönchengladbach	1977 European Cup final	52,078
25 May 1984	(England) Liverpool	1–1 (4-2 pen)	(Italy) Roma	1984 European Cup final	69,693
22 May 1996	(Italy) Juventus	1–1 (4-2 pen)	(Netherlands) Ajax	1996 UEFA Champions League final	70,000
27 May 2009	(Spain) Barcelona	2–0	(England) Manchester United	2009 UEFA Champions League final	62,467

== Notable international rugby union matches ==
1954 European Cup final	24 April 1954	Italy	12–39	France	Stadio dei Centomila, Rome
	16:00 CET	Try: Gabrielli 14'; Lanfranchi 77'; Pen: Dari (2) 23', 59'	Report	Try: M. Prat (2) 9', 20'; Lepatey 43'; Murillo (2) 55', 68'; Larréguy 72'; Boniface 80'; Con: J. Prat (6) 9', 20', 43', 68', 72', 80'; Pen: J. Prat (2) 11', 17'	Attendance: 25,000; Referee: Peter Cooper (England)

1995 South Africa tour of Europe	12 November 1995	Italy	21–40	South Africa	Stadio Olimpico, Rome
	15:00 UTC+1	Try: Arancio 49'; Orlandi 54'; Con: Domínguez 54'; Pen: Domínguez (3) 4', 20', 42'	Report	Try: Mulder 15'; Penalty try 26'; F. Pienaar 71'; H. le Roux 78'; Con: Stransky (4) 15', 26', 71', 78'; Pen: Stransky (4) 12', 57', 60', 66'	Attendance: 35,000; Referee: Steve Lander (England)

2013 Six Nations	3 February 2013	Italy	23–18	France	Stadio Olimpico, Rome
	16:00 UTC+1	Try: Parisse 4'; Castrogiovanni 56'; Con: Orquera (2) 4', 56'; Pen: Orquera 17'; Drop: Orquera 14'; Burton 68'	Report	Try: Picamoles 11'; Fall 33'; Con: Michalak 33'; Pen: Michalak (2) 27', 49'	Attendance: 57,547; Referee: Nigel Owens (Wales)

2013 Six Nations	16 February 2013	Italy	22–15	Ireland	Stadio Olimpico, Rome
	15:30 UTC+1	Try: Venditti 48'; Con: Orquera 48'; Pen: Orquera (4) 13', 21', 69', 80'; García 35'	Report	Pen: P. Jackson (5) 5', 40', 52', 57', 63'	Attendance: 74,174; Referee: Wayne Barnes (England)

2024 Six Nations	9 March 2024	Italy	31–29	Scotland	Stadio Olimpico, Rome
	15:15 UTC+1	Try: Brex 14'; Lynagh 43'; Varney 56'; Con: P. Garbisi (2) 15', 58'; Pen: P. Garbisi (3) 1', 34', 72'; Page-Relo 38'	Report	Try: Fagerson 5'; Steyn 11'; Schoeman 27'; Skinner 77'; Con: Russell (3) 7', 12', 77'; Pen: Russell 24'	Attendance: 69,689; Referee: Angus Gardner (Australia)

2026 Six Nations	7 March 2026	Italy	23-18	England	Stadio Olimpico, Rome
	17:40 UTC+1	Try: Menoncello 33'; Marin 71'; Con: Garbisi 34', 72'; Pen: Garbisi 20', 56', 60'	Report	Try: Freeman 25'; Roebuck 41'; Con: Smith 42'; Pen: Smith 44', 53'	Attendance: 68,985; Referee: Luc Ramos (France)

== See also ==
- List of football stadiums in Italy
- Lists of stadiums

Events and tenants
Preceded by Cricket Ground; Melbourne	Summer Olympics; Main venue 1960	Succeeded by National Stadium; Tokyo
Preceded by Santiago Bernabéu Stadium; Madrid	UEFA European Championship; Final venue 1968	Succeeded by Heysel Stadium; Brussels
Preceded by Olympic Stadium; Helsinki	European Athletics Championships; Main venue 1974	Succeeded by Evžen Rošický Stadium; Prague
Preceded by Lenin Stadium; Moscow	Summer Universiade; Main venue 1975	Succeeded by Levski Stadium; Sofia
Preceded by Hampden Park; Glasgow	European Cup; Final venue 1977	Succeeded by Wembley; London
Preceded by Red Star Stadium; Belgrade	UEFA European Championship; Final venue 1980	Succeeded by Parc des Princes; Paris
Preceded by Olympic Stadium; Montreal	IAAF World Cup; Main venue 1981	Succeeded by National Athletics Stadium; Canberra
Preceded by Olympic Stadium; Athens	European Cup; Final venue 1984	Succeeded by Heysel Stadium; Brussels
Preceded by Olympic Stadium; Helsinki	IAAF World Championships in Athletics; Main venue 1987	Succeeded by National Stadium; Tokyo
Preceded by Estadio Azteca; Mexico City	FIFA World Cup; Final venue 1990	Succeeded by Rose Bowl; Pasadena
Preceded by –	Military World Games; Main venue 1995	Succeeded by Stadion Maksimir; Zagreb
Preceded by Ernst-Happel-Stadion; Vienna	UEFA Champions League; Final venue 1996	Succeeded by Olympiastadion; Munich
Preceded by Luzhniki Stadium; Moscow	UEFA Champions League; Final venue 2009	Succeeded by Santiago Bernabéu Stadium; Madrid
