= Teatro Ariston =

Theatre in Sanremo, Italy

Ariston Theatre
- Teatro Ariston

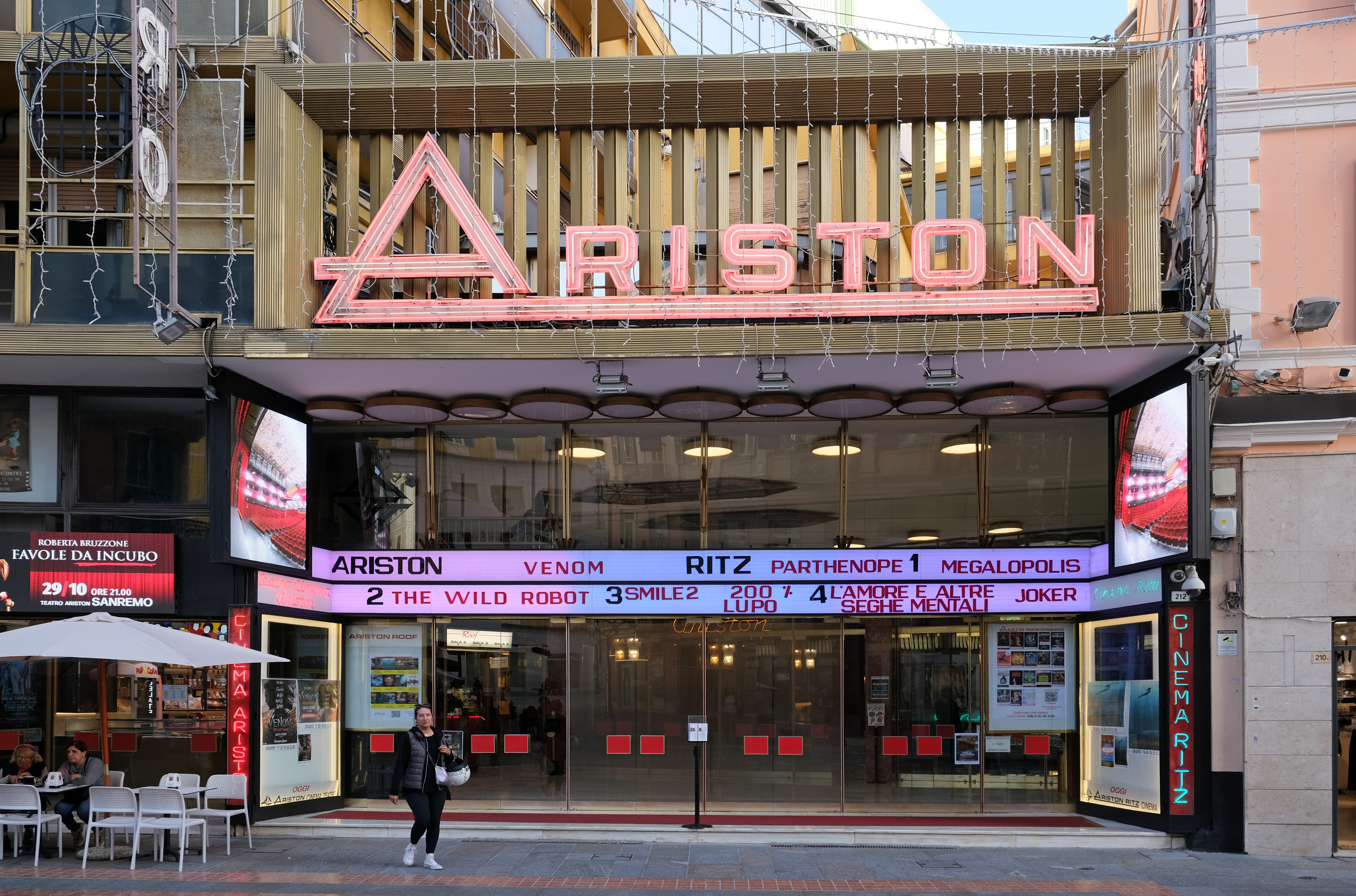
- Front facade of the Ariston Theatre in 2024
- Interactive map of Ariston Theatre
- Address: Via G. Matteotti, 212
- Location: Sanremo, Italy
- Coordinates: 43°49′3″N 7°46′40″E
- Owner: Vacchino family
- Seating type: Reserved
- Capacity: 3,000
- Type: Indoor theatre and cinema

Construction
- Built: 1953–1963
- Opened: 1963; 63 years ago
- Architects: Marco Lavarello; Dante Datta

Website
- aristonsanremo.com

The Ariston Theatre (Italian: Teatro Ariston [teˈaːtro ˈaːriston]; from Ancient Greek ἄριστον, meaning "the best") is a theatre and cinema in Sanremo, Italy. It is best known as the venue of the annual Sanremo Music Festival, which it has hosted since 1977.

== History ==
In the 1940s, Aristide Vacchino acquired the land on which the theatre was later built. Construction began in 1953, and the Ariston Theatre opened in 1963. The building was designed by architects Marco Lavarello and Dante Datta, with engineers Franco Ravera, Angelo Frisa and Gino Sacerdote involved in the project.

The Ariston has been used as a cinema and as a venue for theatrical performances and other events. It became known throughout Italy after becoming the home of the Sanremo Music Festival in 1977. The festival, founded in 1951, had previously been held in the Salone delle Feste of the Casino of Sanremo. In 1990, the festival was held at the new flower market in Valle Armea, in the Bussana area, because of capacity requirements and restoration and expansion work at the Ariston. The theatre continued to host other events connected with that edition of the festival.

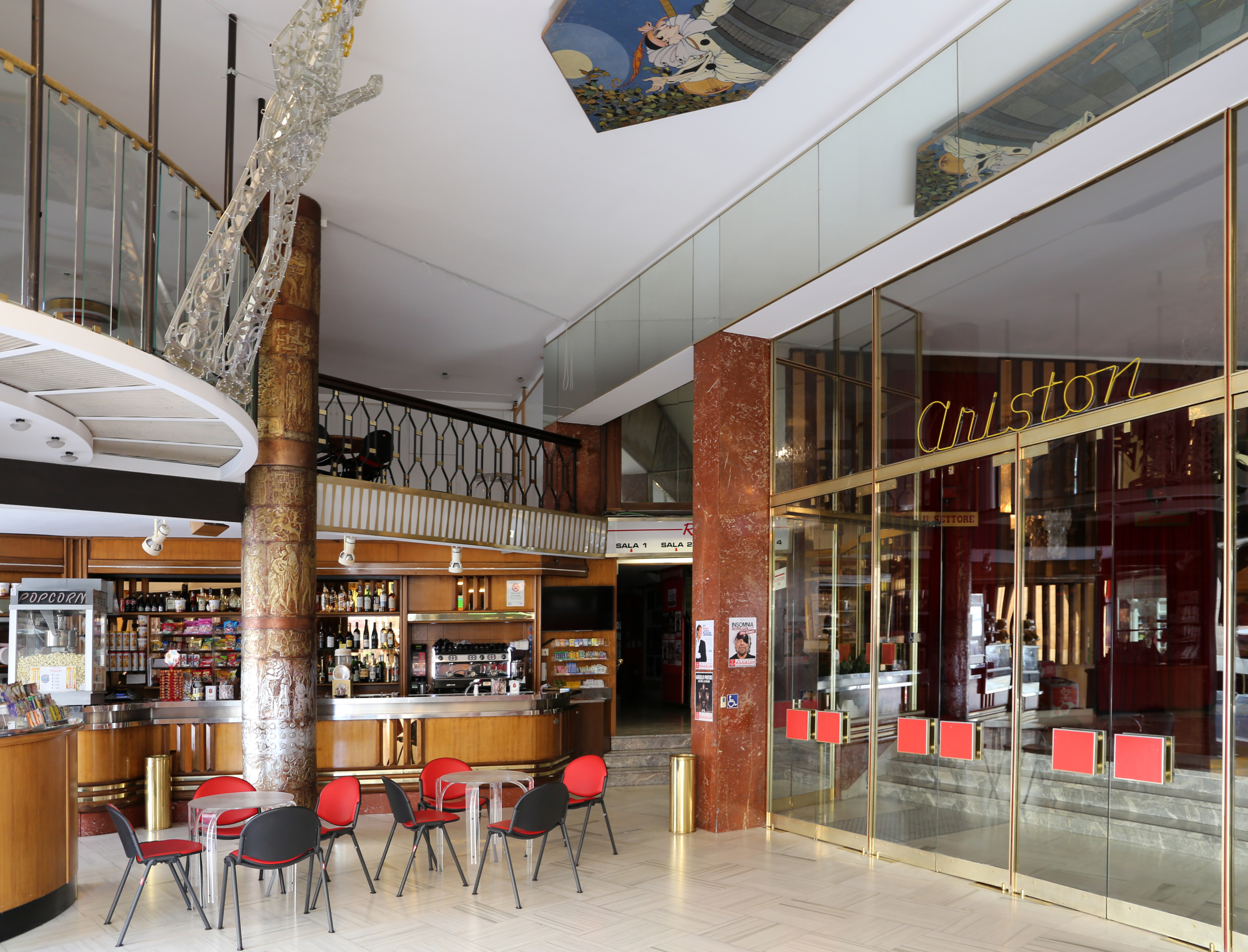
Entrance to the foyer

In addition to the Sanremo Music Festival, the Ariston hosts the annual Premio Tenco. Until 2014, it also hosted the Premio regia televisiva, also known as the Oscar TV. The theatre was the broadcast venue for the first two editions of the Rai 1 television programme Ti lascio una canzone in 2008 and 2009, the talent show Sanremo Young in 2018 and 2019, and the 2021 edition of PrimaFestival.

Since the 1980s, the theatre has also hosted the special episode of Domenica in dedicated to the most recent edition of the Sanremo Music Festival. The episode is broadcast the day after the festival final, which is traditionally held on a Saturday.

The theatre remains owned by the Vacchino family. In 2017, the family purchased a four-storey building adjacent to the theatre as part of an expansion project intended to provide new dressing rooms, meeting rooms and logistics areas.
