= List of football stadiums in Italy =

The following is a list of football stadiums in Italy, ranked in order of capacity, with the minimum capacity being 5,000. Below the list is a list with smaller venues and a list with future venues.

== Current stadiums ==
#	Image	Stadium	Capacity	City	Region	Home team	Opened	UEFA rank
1		San Siro Stadium	75,817	Milan	Lombardy	AC Milan, Inter Milan	1926	4/4 stars
2		Stadio Olimpico	70,634	Rome	Lazio	AS Roma, SS Lazio	1937	4/4 stars
3		Stadio San Nicola	58,270	Bari	Apulia	SSC Bari	1990	3/4 stars
4		Stadio Diego Armando Maradona	54,732	Naples	Campania	SSC Napoli	1959	3/4 stars
5		Stadio Artemio Franchi	43,147	Florence	Tuscany	ACF Fiorentina	1931	
6		Juventus Stadium (Allianz Stadium)	41,507	Turin	Piedmont	Juventus FC	2011	4/4 stars
7		Stadio Marc'Antonio Bentegodi	39,371	Verona	Veneto	Hellas Verona FC	1963	
8		Stadio San Filippo	38,722	Messina	Sicily	ACR Messina	2004	
9		Stadio Renato Dall'Ara	38,279	Bologna	Emilia-Romagna	Bologna FC 1909	1927	
10		Stadio Renzo Barbera	36,349	Palermo	Sicily	Palermo FC	1932	
11		Stadio Luigi Ferraris	33,205	Genoa	Liguria	Genoa CFC and UC Sampdoria	1911	
12		Stadio Euganeo	32,336	Padua	Veneto	Calcio Padova	1994	
13		Stadio Via del Mare	31,533	Lecce	Apulia	US Lecce	1966	
14		Stadio Arechi	31,300	Salerno	Campania	Salernitana	1990	
15		Stadio Flaminio	30,000	Rome	Lazio	None	1959	
16		Stadio Renato Curi	28,000	Perugia	Umbria	Perugia Calcio	1975	
17		Stadio Olimpico Grande Torino	27,958	Turin	Piedmont	Torino FC	1933	4/4 stars
18		Stadio Erasmo Iacovone	27,584	Taranto	Apulia	Taranto	1965	
19		Stadio Oreste Granillo	27,543	Reggio Calabria	Calabria	Reggina Calcio	1932	
20		Stadio Nereo Rocco	26,566	Trieste	Friuli-Venezia Giulia	US Triestina	1992	
21		Stadio Partenio-Adriano Lombardi	26,000	Avellino	Campania	US Avellino	1973	
22		Stadio Ciro Vigorito	25,554	Benevento	Campania	Benevento Calcio	1979	
23		Dacia Arena (Stadio Friuli)	25,144	Udine	Friuli-Venezia Giulia	Udinese Calcio	1976	4/4 stars
24		Stadio Pino Zaccheria	25,085	Foggia	Apulia	US Foggia	1925	
25		Arena Garibaldi	25,000	Pisa	Tuscany	AC Pisa	1919	
26		Gewiss Stadium	24,950	Bergamo	Lombardy	Atalanta BC	1928	4/4 stars
27		Stadio San Vito	24,479	Cosenza	Calabria	Cosenza Calcio	1963	
28		Stadio del Conero	23,976	Ancona	Marche	AC Ancona	1992	
29		Stadio Dino Manuzzi	23,860	Cesena	Emilia-Romagna	AC Cesena	1957	
30		Mapei Stadium – Città del Tricolore	23,717	Reggio Emilia	Emilia-Romagna	Sassuolo and Reggiana	1995	
31		Stadio Angelo Massimino	23,266	Catania	Sicily	Calcio Catania	1937	
32		Stadio Ennio Tardini	22,352	Parma	Emilia-Romagna	Parma Calcio 1913	1923	
33		Stadio Riviera delle Palme	22,000	San Benedetto del Tronto	Marche	Sambenedettese	1985	
34		Stadio Leonardo Garilli	21,668	Piacenza	Emilia-Romagna	Piacenza Calcio	1969	
35		Stadio Alberto Braglia	21,092	Modena	Emilia-Romagna	Modena FC	1936	
36		Stadio Giovanni Zini	20,641	Cremona	Lombardy	Cremonese	1929	
37		Stadio Cino e Lillo Del Duca	20,550	Ascoli Piceno	Marche	Ascoli Calcio 1898	1962	
38		Stadio Adriatico	20,515	Pescara	Abruzzo	Delfino Pescara 1936	1955	
39		Stadio Mario Rigamonti	19,550	Brescia	Lombardy	Brescia Calcio	1959	
40		Stadio Armando Picchi	19,238	Livorno	Tuscany	AS Livorno	1933	
41		Stadio Brianteo	18,568	Monza	Lombardy	AC Monza	1988	
42		Stadio Silvio Piola (Novara)	17,875	Novara	Piedmont	Novara Calcio	1976	
43		Stadio Libero Liberati	17,460	Terni	Umbria	Ternana Calcio	1969	
44		Stadio Ezio Scida	16,547	Crotone	Calabria	FC Crotone	1946	
45		Stadio Carlo Castellani	16,284	Empoli	Tuscany	Empoli FC	1923	
46		Sardegna Arena	16,233	Cagliari	Sardinia	Cagliari Calcio	2017	
47		Stadio Paolo Mazza	16,134	Ferrara	Emilia-Romagna	SPAL	1928	
48		Stadio Benito Stirpe	16,125	Frosinone	Lazio	Frosinone	2017	
49		Stadio Artemio Franchi	15,373	Siena	Tuscany	AC Siena	1923	
50		Stadio Danilo Martelli	14,844	Mantua	Lombardy	AC Mantova	1949	
51		Stadio Nicola Ceravolo	14,650	Catanzaro	Calabria	FC Catanzaro	1919	
52		Stadio Giuseppe Sinigaglia	13,602	Como	Lombardy	Calcio Como	1927	
53		Stadio Marcello Melani	13,195	Pistoia	Tuscany	AC Pistoiese	1966	
54		Stadio Città di Arezzo	13,128	Arezzo	Tuscany	AC Arezzo	1961	
55		Stadio Romeo Menti	13,000	Vicenza	Veneto	Vicenza Calcio	1984	
56		Stadio Romeo Menti	13,000	Castellammare di Stabia	Campania	SS Juve Stabia	1985	
57		Stadio Simonetta Lamberti	12,200	Cava de' Tirreni	Campania	Cavese 1919	1969	
58		Stadio Bruno Benelli	12,020	Ravenna	Emilia-Romagna	Ravenna Calcio	1966	
59		Stadio Alberto Pinto	12,000	Caserta	Campania	Casertana	1936	
60		Stadio Arturo Collana	12,000	Naples	Campania	Internapoli FC	1925	
61		Stadio Vanni Sanna	12,000	Sassari	Sardegna	Sassari Torres	1922	
62		Stadio Pier Luigi Penzo	11,150	Venice	Veneto	Venezia FC	1913	
63		Stadio Alberto Picco	10,336	La Spezia	Liguria	Spezia Calcio	1919	
64		Arena Civica	10,000	Milan	Lombardia	Alcione	1807	
65		Stadio Omobono Tenni	10,000	Treviso	Veneto	Treviso FC	1933	

== Stadiums with a capacity below 10,000 ==
A capacity of at least 5,000 is required.

Stadium	Capacity	City	Home team
Stadio Pier Cesare Tombolato	7,623	Cittadella	AS Cittadella
Giuseppe Moccagatta	5,926	Alessandria	Juventus Next Gen
Stadio Druso	5,530	Bolzano	FC Südtirol
Stadio Silvio Piola	5,505	Vercelli	Pro Vercelli
Guido Teghil	5,000	Lignano Sabbiadoro	ASD E. Brian Lignano
Carlo Speroni	5,000	Busto Arsizio	Pro Patria

== Future stadiums and developments ==
Stadiums which are currently in development, and are likely to open in the near future, include:

Stadium	Capacity	City	Region	Home team	Opening
Stadio Erasmo Iacovone	16,036	Taranto	Apulia	Taranto	2026
Stadio Artemio Franchi	40,000	Florence	Tuscany	Fiorentina	2029
Bosco dello Sport	18,000	Venice	Veneto	Venezia	2028
New AS Roma Stadium	60,650	Rome	Lazio	Roma	TBD
Stadio Flaminio	50,750	Rome	Lazio	Lazio	TBD
Stadio Arechi	35,000	Salerno	Campania	Salernitana	TBD
Stadio Renato Dall’Ara	30,325	Bologna	Emilia-Romagna	Bologna	TBD
Cagliari Arena	25,200	Cagliari	Sardinia	Cagliari	
Stadio Ennio Tardini	20,986	Parma	Emilia-Romagna	Parma	
Computer Gross Arena	18,600	Empoli	Tuscany	Empoli	
Stadio Giuseppe Sinigaglia	15,000	Como	Lombardy	Como	
Stadio Porta Elisa	12,000	Lucca	Tuscany	Lucchese	

== See also ==
- List of European stadiums by capacity
- List of association football stadiums by capacity
- List of association football stadiums by country
- List of sports venues by capacity
- Lists of stadiums
- Football in Italy
