= Angelo Frisa =

Italian engineer

- Born: 17 April 1904; Borgomanero, Province of Novara, Kingdom of Italy
- Died: 14 January 1968 (aged 63); Turin, Italy
- Occupation: Civil engineer

Angelo Frisa (17 April 1904 – 14 January 1968) was an Italian engineer. His work was part of the architecture event in the art competition at the 1936 Summer Olympics.

== Career ==
Frisa played a significant role in the design and expansion of the Stadio dei Cipressi (now Stadio Olimpico) in Rome. The stadium was originally constructed between 1928 and 1932, with Frisa later contributing to its capacity expansion, completed in 1937.

He was one of Italy's most prolific engineers during the interwar period. His contributions included the Savoia-Marchetti aircraft hangars and sections of the Fiat Mirafiori industrial complex.

After World War II, Frisa continued his work on an international scale, overseeing over 2,000 projects across Europe, Africa, and South America. He also worked on Italian highways, such as the Turin-Milan motorway, as well as numerous industrial facilities for Fiat and other companies.
