= Tommy Freeman =

Tommy Freeman may refer to:

- Tomás Freeman, Irish Gaelic footballer
- Tommy Freeman (boxer) (1904–1986), American boxer
- Tommy Freeman (rugby union) (born 2001), English rugby player
