= Achille Pintonello =

Italian architect

- Born: 6 September 1902; Pianiga, Italy
- Died: 25 December 1994 (aged 92)
- Occupation: Architect

Achille Pintonello (6 September 1902 – 25 December 1994) was an Italian architect. His work was part of the architecture event in the art competition at the 1936 Summer Olympics.
