= List of Italo disco artists and songs =

The following is a list of Italo disco artists and songs, divided in two sections. The first section includes Italo disco groups and solo artists. The second section includes Italo disco songs.

== Artists ==
- Alba
- Albert One
- Aleph
- Baby's Gang
- Baltimora
- [B.W.H.]
- [Big Ben Tribe]
- Alberto Camerini
- Nadia Cassini
- [Clio (Italian project)|Clio]
- [Cyber People]
- Pino D'Angiò
- Tullio De Piscopo
- Den Harrow
- [Doctor's Cat]
- Valerie Dore
- Tony Esposito
- Fake
- Mike Francis
- Fun Fun
- Gazebo
- Hipnosis (or Hypnosis)
- Tom Hooker
- Eddy Huntington
- Jock Hattle
- Ivan
- Kano
- Klein + M.B.O.
- Koto
- La Bionda
- Ken Laszlo
- Gary Low
- Sandy Marton
- Miko Mission
- Moon Ray (a.k.a. Raggio Di Luna)
- Giorgio Moroder
- P. Lion
- [Mr. Flagio]
- Ryan Paris
- Raf
- Righeira
- Linda Jo Rizzo
- Alexander Robotnick
- Sabrina
- Savage
- Scotch
- Silver Pozzoli
- Claudio Simonetti
- Spagna
- Tracy Spencer
- Taffy
- Umberto Tozzi
- Celso Valli
- Vivien Vee

== Songs ==
Year	Artist	Song
1978	La Bionda	"One for You, One for Me"
1978	Giorgio Moroder	"Chase"
1978	Riz Ortolani	"Il corpo di Linda"
1979	Easy Going	"Fear"
1979	Tantra	"Hills of Katmandu"
1980	Kano	"Holly Dolly"
1980	Kano	"I'm Ready"
1980	Kano	"It's a War"
1980	Kano	"Now Baby Now"
1981	A Number of Names	"Sharevari"
1981	Passengers	"The Last Romantic"
1982	Blackway	"New Life"
1982	Dharma	"Plastic Doll"
1982	Electra	"Feels Good"
1982	Klein + M.B.O.	"Dirty Talk"
1982	'Lectric Workers	"Robot Is Systematic"
1982	Gary Low	"You Are a Danger"
1982	Pink Project	"Amama"
1982	Gino Soccio	"Remember"
1982	Steel Mind	"Bad Passion"
1983	Asso	"Do It Again"
1983	B.W.H.	"Stop"
1983	Baby's Gang	"Happy Song"
1983	Carrara	"Disco King"
1983	Casco	"Cybernetic Love"
1983	Charlie	"Spacer Woman"
1983	Doctor's Cat	"Feel the Drive"
1983	Fun Fun	"Happy Station"
1983	Gazebo	"I Like Chopin"
1983	Gazebo	"Love in Your Eyes"
1983	Helen	"Witch"
1983	Kano	"Another Life"
1983	Klein + M.B.O.	"The MBO Theme"
1983	Gary Low	"I Want You"
1983	Mr. Flagio	"Take a Chance"
1983	My Mine	"Hypnotic Tango"
1983	P. Lion	"Happy Children"
1983	Plustwo	"Melody"
1983	Ryan Paris	"Dolce Vita"
1983	Righeira	"Vamos a la playa"
1983	Alexander Robotnick	"Problèmes d'amour"
1983	Bob Salton	"Starknight"
1983	Savage	"Don't Cry Tonight"
1983	Scotch	"Penguins' Invasion"
1984	Baby's Gang	"Challenger"
1984	Baltimora	"Tarzan Boy"
1984	Big Ben Tribe	"Tarzan Loves the Summer Nights"
1984	Carrara	"Shine on Dance"
1984	Cyber People	"Polaris"
1984	Valerie Dore	"Get Closer"
1984	Valerie Dore	"The Night"
1984	Fake	"Frogs in Spain"
1984	Danny Keith	"Keep on Music"
1984	Sandy Marton	"People from Ibiza"
1984	Miko Mission	"How Old Are You?"
1984	Moon Ray	"Comanchero"
1984	Novecento	"Movin' On"
1984	P. Lion	"Dream"
1984	Ryan Paris	"Fall in Love"
1984	Raf	"Self Control"
1984	Rose	"Magic Carillon"
1984	Alexander Robotnick	"Dance Boy Dance"
1984	Scotch	"Disco Band"
1984	Topo & Roby	"Under the Ice"
1985	Clio	"Faces"
1985	Cyber People	"Void Vision"
1985	Den Harrow	"Bad Boy"
1985	Valerie Dore	"It's So Easy"
1985	Brian Ice	"Talking to the Night"
1985	Koto	"Visitors"
1985	Loui$	"Pink Footpath"
1985	Radiorama	"Chance To Desire"
1985	Taffy	"I Love My Radio (Midnight Radio)"
1985	Thai Break	"Flowers in the Rain"
1986	Eddy Huntington	"U.S.S.R."
1986	Koto	"Jabdah"
1986	Radiorama	"Vampires"
1986	Sabrina	"Sexy Girl"
1987	Den Harrow	"Don't Break My Heart"
1987	Eddy Huntington	"Up & Down"
1987	Funny Twins	"You and Me"
1987	Francesco Napoli	"Balla Balla"
1987	Ken Laszlo	"Tonight"
1987	Sabrina	"Boys (Summertime Love)"
1987	Spagna	"Call Me"
2014	Orange Caramel	"Catallena"
2015	Taylor Swift	"Style"
2015	New Order	"Tutti Frutti"
2020	Jessie Ware	"What's Your Pleasure?"
2026	Harry Styles	"American Girls"

== See also ==
- List of Euro disco artists
- List of post-disco artists and songs
