= Scotch discography =

Cataloging of published recordings by Scotch

- Studio albums: 2
- Compilation albums: 3
- Singles: 8

Italian Italo disco band Scotch have released two studio albums, three compilation albums and eight singles.

== Albums ==
=== Studio albums ===
List of studio albums, with selected chart positions
Title	Album details	Peak chart positions		
Title	Album details	GER	SWE	SWI
Evolution	Released: 1985; Label: Many Records (ITA)	63	4	22
Pictures of Old Days	Released: 1987; Label: Many Records (ITA)	—	23	—

=== Compilation albums ===
List of compilation albums, with selected chart positions
Title	Album details	Peak chart positions
Title	Album details	SWE
Disco Band / Penguin Invasion	Released: 1991; Label: Dig It International (ITA)	—
Best of Scotch	Released: 30 November 1992; Label: ZYX (GER)	38
Greatest Hits & Remixes	Released: 12 June 2015; Label: ZYX (GER)	—

== Singles ==
List of singles, with selected chart positions
Title	Year	Peak chart positions						Album
Title	Year	AUT	FRA	GER	NOR	SWE	SWI	Album
"Penguin's Invasion"	1983	—	—	—	—	—	—	non-album single
"Disco Band"	1984	1	—	3	—	20	4	Evolution
"Delirio Mind"	1984	18	—	6	—	5	19	Evolution
"Take Me Up"	1985	—	10	19	—	—	—	Evolution
"Mirage"	1986	—	—	56	—	2	—	Pictures of Old Days
"Money Runner"	1986	—	—	—	10	12	—	Pictures of Old Days
"Pictures"	1987	—	—	—	—	—	—	Pictures of Old Days
"Man to Man"	1987	—	—	—	—	—	—	non-album single
