= Best of Scotch =

Compilation album by Scotch
- Released: 30 November 1992
- Recorded: 1983–1987
- Genre: Italo disco
- Length: 1:11:11
- Label: ZYX

Scotch chronology
| Pictures of Old Days (1987) | Best of Scotch (1992) |

Best of Scotch is a compilation album by the Italian Italo disco band Scotch. Released in Germany in November 1992, it features hit singles and other songs issued by the group between 1983 and 1987.

== Track listing ==
| No. | Title | Writer(s) | Length |
|---|---|---|---|
| 1. | "Disco Band" | Fabio Margutti | 5:07 |
| 2. | "Take Me Up" | Vincenzo Lancini; Margutti | 3:33 |
| 3. | "Mirage" | Lancini; Margutti; David Zambelli | 3:50 |
| 4. | "Money Runner" | Margutti; D. Zambelli; Naimy Hackett | 6:20 |
| 5. | "Man in the Man" | Lancini; Margutti | 4:08 |
| 6. | "Delirio Mind" | Lancini; Margutti | 5:10 |
| 7. | "Loving is Easy" | John Lees | 4:45 |
| 8. | "Drink a Scotch" | Margutti; D. Zambelli | 6:16 |
| 9. | "Pictures" | Margutti; D. Zambelli | 5:22 |
| 10. | "Plus Plus" | Lancini; Margutti; D. Zambelli; Gabriele Balducci | 5:01 |
| 11. | "Caribbean Lady" | Lancini; Margutti; D. Zambelli | 4:46 |
| 12. | "Primitive Man" | Lancini; Margutti | 4:18 |
| 13. | "Take Me Up (Long Remix Version)" | Lancini; Margutti | 6:12 |
| 14. | "Penguin's Invasion" | Manlio Cangelli | 6:23 |
| Total length: | | | 1:11:11 |

== Charts ==
| Chart (1993) | Peak position |
|---|---|
| Swedish Albums (Sverigetopplistan) | 38 |
