= Jabdah =

1986 single by Koto

Single by Koto
- B-side: "Jabdah (D.J. Version)"
- Released: 1986
- Genre: Italo disco
- Label: Memory
- Songwriters: Anfrando Maiola; Stefano Cundari
- Producer: Stefano Cundari

Koto singles chronology
"Visitors" (1985)	"Jabdah" (1986)	"Dragon's Legend" (1988)

"Jabdah" is a song recorded by Italian synthpop group Koto. Released in 1986, it was their first single that charted. It was written by Anfrando Maiola and Stefano Cundari and produced by Stefano Cundari and Alessandro Zanni. The song reached No. 11 in Switzerland, No. 23 in Germany and No. 28 in the Netherlands. Like Koto's previous single "Visitors", it is considered part of the "spacesynth" canon. It is their most remixed song, with twelve official remixes.

The song was used by Australian telecommunications company Optus in a television ad, as part of their 2018 campaign "Both Is Better". In the ad, customers at a fish and chip shop dance to the song after one of them asks for both "regular" and chicken salt on their order of chips.

== Reception ==
In his book In Pista!, Italian writer Rocco Bargioni says: “the watchword is ‘spacesynth’: a sort of ‘hybridized’ Italo disco infused with sci-fi sounds and atmospheres that evoke galaxies, spaceships and robots.” He adds that Jabdah “is a tribute to Jabba the Hutt, who is repeatedly referenced between cosmic harmonic loops.”.

== Track listing and formats ==
- Italian 12-inch maxi-single

A. "Jabdah" (Long Version) – 7:37
B. "Jabdah" (D.J. Version) – 6:18

- German 7-inch single

A. "Jabdah" – 3:36
B. "Jabdah" (D.J. Version) – 3:32

== Charts ==
Weekly chart performance for "Jabdah"
Chart (1986–1987)	Peak position
Austria (Ö3 Austria Top 40)	29
Netherlands (Dutch Top 40)	28
Netherlands (Single Top 100)	31
Switzerland (Schweizer Hitparade)	11
West Germany (GfK)	23
