= Martinelli (band) =

Italo disco project

- Genre: Italo disco
- Label: Il Discotto Records
- Members: Aldo Martinelli; Simona Zanini
- Website: www.martinellizanini.com

Martinelli was a music project of Italian record producer Aldo Martinelli (producer of such italo-disco bands as Scotch and Raggio Di Luna/Moon Ray) and American singer Simona Zanini.

They had their biggest hit with the song "Cenerentola" (1985), which was a hit across Europe, reaching number 8 in West Germany, number 5 in Austria, number 6 in Switzerland and number 5 in France.

== Discography ==
=== Singles ===
- 1983: "Voice (In the Night) (7")"
- 1985: "Cenerentola (cinderella)" — number 8 in West Germany, number 5 in Austria, number 6 in Switzerland
- 1986: "O. Express"
- 1986: "Revolution" — number 18 in Switzerland
- 1987: "O. Express"
- 1987: "Summer Lovers"
- 1987: "Victoria"

=== EPs ===
- 2011. American Band

== See also ==
- Raggio Di Luna (Moon Ray)
- Radiorama
- Topo & Roby
