= Il Discotto Records =

Italian record label

- Founded: 1982; 44 years ago
- Founder: Roberto Fusar-Poli
- Defunct: 1987
- Distributors: Discotto (1982-1983), Il Discotto Productions (1983-1987)
- Genre: Electronic, Rock
- Country of origin: Italy
- Location: Cologno Monzese

Il Discotto Productions was the second biggest Italo-Disco record label and distribution company.

It was founded in 1982, and managed by Roberto Fusar-Poli. The company started in Sesto San Giovanni, and then moved to Cologno Monzese in 1983, two towns in the Greater Milan area. It was one of the most successful Italian labels of the 1980s, rivaling with Discomagic.

Discotto released material by many well-known artists like Gary Low, Scotch, Doctor's Cat, Brand Image, Gazebo, Martinelli, Paul Sharada, Betty Miranda, Reeds, Mike Rogers, Raggio Di Luna, Hot Cold, Eugene, Max Coveri, Gay Cat Park, as well as obscure Italo disco acts. In its early releases, the Il Discotto label had a strong electro sound.

Il Discotto closed down in the first half of 1987 due to financial issues.

== Sub-labels ==
- Blood Record
- Crash
- Discotto Metal
- DR
- F.D.T. (Fuori Di Testa)
- Hiss Records
- Land Record
- Peecker Melody
- Tanga Label
- Thick Record
- WMB Production

== Songs & Compilations ==
Year	Artist	Song	Catalog Number
1982	Gay Cat Park	"I'm A Vocoder"	ART 1001
1982	Gary Low	"You Are A Danger"	ART 1002
1982	Bo Boss	"Tequila"	ART 1003
1982	Thanya	"Freedom"	ART 1004
1982	Trilogy	"Not Love"	ART 1005
1982	Various	Cocktail '83	ART 1006
1983	Moonbase	"Waiting For A Train"	ART 1007
1983	Reportage	"Madly In Love"	ART 1008
1983	Some Bizarre	"Don't Be Afraid"	ART 1009
1983	The Flash Back Band	"Flash"	ART 1010
1983	Los Angeles T.F.	"Magical Body"	ART 1011
1983	First Vision	"Revelation Day"	ART 1012
1983	Various	Discottantatre	ART 1015
1983	Doctor's Cat	"Feel The Drive"	ART 1016
1983	Roby Bonardi & Cuba Club	"I Want You Baby I Really Do"	ART 1017
1983	Silvie Stone	"Charning Prince"	ART 1018
1983	The Twins	"Not The Loving Kind"	ART 1019
1983	Brand Image	"Are You Loving?"	ART 1020
1983	Donna Eyes	"God Knows"	ART 1021
1983	M.B.4.	"Ewok Celebration & Star Wars"	ART 1022
1983	Various	Hula Hoop	ART 1023
1983	Martinelli	"Voice (In The Night)"	ART 1024
1983	Cat Gang	"Locomotive Breath"	ART 1025
1983	Fire, Body & Ice	"Liberation"	ART 1026
1983	Splashdance	"Maniacalive"	ART 1027
1983	Doctor's Cat	"Watch Out!"	ART 1028
1983	Carol Kane	"I Don't Believe"	ART 1029
1983	Various	Strike (Full Mix)	ART 1030
1983	Various	Strike (Part. 1)	ART 1031
1983	Various	Strike (Part. 2)	ART 1032
1983	Various	Special For Midem	ART PD 1033
1984	Digital Emotion	"Digital Emotion (Album)"	ART 1034
1984	Various	Masterpiece	ART 1035
1984	Reeds	"The Game"	ART 1036
1984	Rita	"Adorable Sixties"	ART 1037
1984	Betty Miranda	"Take Me To The Top"	ART 1038
1984	The Family Number One	"Lara De Bahia"	ART 1039
1984	Doctor's Cat	"Gee Wiz (Album)"	ART 1041
1984	Manuel de Leo	"Hasta La Vista"	ART 1042
1984	Raggio Di Luna	"Comanchero"	ART 1043
1984	Topo & Roby	"Under The Ice"	ART 1044
1984	Various	Masterpiece 2	ART 1045
1984	Cynthia	"Springtime"	ART 1046
1984	Paul Sharada	"Dancing All The Night"	ART 1047
1984	Raggio Di Luna	"Comanchero (Remix)"	ART 1048
1984	Doctor's Cat	"Gee Wiz Medley with War Song"	ART 1048
1984	Chris Lang	"Old Calipso Tune"	ART 1049
1984	Various	Strike 2°	ART 1050
1985	Fake	"Arabian Toys"	ART 1051
1985	Marla Adler	"Hard To Love"	ART 1052
1985	Paul Sharada	"Dancing All The Night (Remix)"	ART 1053
1985	Cerrone	"The Collector"	ART 1054
1985	Cerrone	"The Collector (Album)"	ART 1055
1985	Gino Soccio	"Human Nature"	ART 1056
1985	Reeds	"In Your Eyes"	ART 1057
1985	501's feat. Desiree	"Let The Night Take The Blame"	ART 1058
1985	Mikron	"Polynesia"	ART 1059
1985	Fake	"Brick"	ART 1060
1985	Paul Sharada	"Keep Your Love Alive"	ART 1061
1985	Various	Bikini	ART 1065
1985	Steve Eden & Paul James	"Memories Emotions"	ART 1066
1985	Reggie	"One The Park"	ART 1067
1986	Reeds	"Marines"	ART 1068
1986	Mariana	"Talk About Love"	ART 1069
1986	Paul Sharada	"Boxers"	ART 1070
1986	Hot Cold	"I Can Hear Your Voice"	ART 1071

== Miscellaneous ==
Year	Artist	Song	Catalog Number
1982	Hotline	"Fantasy"	DISC 001
1982	Divine	"Shoot Your Shot"	DISC 002
1982	The Twins	"Face To Face-Heart To Heart"	DISC 003
1982	Jo-Jo	"Mind Games"	DISC 1001
1982	Snoopy	"Dance"	BIG 001
1982	Orange	"From Halley"	G.V. 001
1982	Silvy Trench	"Reality Could Be A Dream"	L 003
1982	Grey Cat	"Games We Plaid In The Past"	M.M. 001
1982	Concorde	"Prophet Of Life"	P.R. 001
