= Koto (band) =

Italian synthpop group

- Origin: Italy
- Genres: Synthpop, Italo disco, hi-NRG
- Instrument(s): Synthesizer, drum machine
- Years active: 1982–1993, 2001–2023
- Labels: Memory Records
- Past members: Stefano Cundari (1982–1990, d. 1993 †); Anfrando Maiola (1982–1990, 2001–2023 †); Alessandro Zanni (1982); Michiel van der Kuy (1989–1994); Roberto Bisca (2001–2023); Alex Cundari (2001–2023)

Koto was an Italo disco group that originally consisted of Anfrando Maiola and Stefano Cundari, later with the Dutch composer Michiel van der Kuy.

== History ==
In 1982, Italian musician Anfrando Maiola (b. 1954 in Parma, Italy; d. 26 May 2023.) teamed up with Stefano Cundari and Alessandro Zanni and released their first single "Chinese Revenge" on Cellophane Record (Studio Veronica's label). The following year, Cundari and Zanni formed Memory Records and re-released "Chinese Revenge". The single proved to be very popular in Italy, selling over 10,000 copies. It also proved to be a minor hit in Germany and the Netherlands.

After the success of "Chinese Revenge", they began writing songs for other bands, including Baby's Gang ("Happy Song", "Challenger"), and helped fellow Italian band "Hipnosis" cover Vangelis' song "Pulstar". It was released in 1983, going Top 10 in Germany and Top 20 in Switzerland. The same year, Maiola and Cundari released another single "Japanese War Game", under the Koto name, which became another hit.

In 1985, Koto released "Visitors". In an interview with Maiola, he confirmed it was his favourite Koto song. The track contains a sample from Michael Jackson's 1984 hit "Thriller". The following year, he released another single, titled "Jabdah". Fueled by a music video, the song became a big hit, charting in Germany, the Netherlands and Switzerland. Around this time, critics coined the term "spacesynth", which combines elements of Italo disco and Space disco. "Visitors" and "Jabdah" are considered part of the genre. In 1987, a megamix was released, combining elements of their previous four singles.

In 1990 house and techno music was becoming popular, and Italo disco began to decline in popularity. Nevertheless, Koto released another single, "Dragon's Legend". Containing samples from the 1983 video game Dragon's Lair, the song proved a minor hit in the Netherlands, peaking at No. 20. By now, Memory Records began running into financial problems. In 1989, they remixed their debut single, "Chinese Revenge", for a more dance flavour and Maiola composed his next single under the Koto name, the house-flavoured, "Champion's Cue". The song was not as popular as their previous singles, as Memory Records began releasing Techno and House music records. This did not prove a success, and the label went broke.

The rights to Memory Records were acquired by ZYX Music. They asked Dutch composer Michiel van der Kuy (of the spacesynth band Laserdance, best known for their 1986 hit single "Humanoid Invasion") to follow the steps of Maiola and Cundari. In 1989, he presented the first full-length Koto album Masterpieces, containing remakes of previous Koto songs, and his own compositions, including "Time", "Minoan War" and "Plain". In the following years, he released more singles, including "Acknowledge" (1990), "Mechanic Sense" (1992) and "Mind Machine" (1992), the main melody of which was clearly inspired by the song "Disco Maniac" by Baby's Gang.

In 1992, Michiel van der Kuy published another Koto album, From the Dawn of Time, composed entirely by himself. He also released two cover albums in 1990 and 1993. After this, Koto fell silent. Stefano Cundari died from cancer on December 29, 1993.

In 2001, Maiola bought back the rights to the Koto name, and released three more singles under that alias. Maiola died on May 26, 2023.

== Discography ==
=== Albums ===
- Masterpieces (1989)
- Koto Plays Synthesizer World Hits (1990)
- From the Dawn of Time (1992)
- Koto Plays Science-Fiction Movie Themes (1993)
- Return of The Dragon (2021)

=== Singles ===
- "Chinese Revenge" (1982)
- "Japanese War Game" (1983)
- "Visitors" (1985)
- "Jabdah" (1986) (Switzerland: 11, Germany: 23, Netherlands: 28)
- "The Koto Mix" (1987)
- "Dragon's Legend" (1988) (Netherlands: 20)
- "Dragon's Megamix" (1988) Dragon's Legend replaced to Dragon's Megamix.
- "Time" (1989)
- "Champion's Cue" (1990)
- "Acknowledge" (1990)
- "Mechanic Sense" (1992)
- "Mind Machine" (1992)
- "Koto Is Still Alive" (2001)
- "Blow The Whistle" (2003)
- "Planet X" (2003)
- "Tron" (2022)
- "Sputnik / Overdrive" (2023)

=== Compilations ===
- Mind Machine (1992)
- The 12" Mixes (1995)
- Greatest Hits & Remixes (2015)
