= List of number-one hits of 1984 (Italy) =

This is a list of number-one songs in 1984 on the Italian charts compiled weekly by the Italian Hit Parade Singles Chart.

== Chart history ==
Issue Date	Song	Artist(s)	Ref.
January 7	"La donna cannone"	Francesco De Gregori	
January 14	"La donna cannone"	Francesco De Gregori	
January 21	"La donna cannone"	Francesco De Gregori	
January 28	"La donna cannone"	Francesco De Gregori	
February 4	"La donna cannone"	Francesco De Gregori	
February 11	"La donna cannone"	Francesco De Gregori	
February 18	"La donna cannone"	Francesco De Gregori	
February 25	"La donna cannone"	Francesco De Gregori	
March 3	"La donna cannone"	Francesco De Gregori	
March 10	"La donna cannone"	Francesco De Gregori	
March 17	"Ci sarà"	Al Bano and Romina Power	
March 24	"Ci sarà"	Al Bano and Romina Power	
March 31	"Ci sarà"	Al Bano and Romina Power	
April 7	"Love of the Common People"	Paul Young	
April 14	"Love of the Common People"	Paul Young	
April 21	"Love of the Common People"	Paul Young	
April 28	"Love of the Common People"	Paul Young	
May 5	"Love of the Common People"	Paul Young	
May 12	"Love of the Common People"	Paul Young	
May 19	"Love of the Common People"	Paul Young	
May 26	"Love of the Common People"	Paul Young	
June 2	"Love of the Common People"	Paul Young	
June 9	"Jump"	Van Halen	
June 16	"I Treni di Tozeur"	Alice and Franco Battiato	
June 23	"Self Control"	Raf	
June 30	"Self Control"	Raf	
July 7	"Self Control"	Raf	
July 14	"Self Control"	Raf	
July 21	"Self Control"	Raf	
July 28	"Self Control"	Raf	
August 4	"Self Control"	Raf	
August 11	"Self Control"	Raf	
August 18	"Fotoromanza"	Gianna Nannini	
August 25	"Fotoromanza"	Gianna Nannini	
September 1	"Fotoromanza"	Gianna Nannini	
September 8	"Fotoromanza"	Gianna Nannini	
September 15	"Friends"	Amii Stewart	
September 22	"Friends"	Amii Stewart	
September 29	"Friends"	Amii Stewart	
October 6	"Friends"	Amii Stewart	
October 13	"Movin' On"	Novecento	
October 20	"People from Ibiza"	Sandy Marton	
October 27	"Sounds Like a Melody"	Alphaville	
November 3	"Sounds Like a Melody"	Alphaville	
November 10	"I Just Called to Say I Love You"	Stevie Wonder	
November 17	"I Just Called to Say I Love You"	Stevie Wonder	
November 24	"I Just Called to Say I Love You"	Stevie Wonder	
December 1	"I Just Called to Say I Love You"	Stevie Wonder	
December 8	"I Just Called to Say I Love You"	Stevie Wonder	
December 15	"I Just Called to Say I Love You"	Stevie Wonder	
December 22	"I Just Called to Say I Love You"	Stevie Wonder	
December 29	"I Just Called to Say I Love You"	Stevie Wonder	

== Number-one artists ==
Position	Artist	Weeks #1
1	Francesco De Gregori	10
2	Paul Young	9
3	Stevie Wonder	8
3	Raf	8
4	Amii Stewart	4
4	Gianna Nannini	4
5	Albano	3
5	Romina	3
6	Alphaville	2
7	Alice	1
7	Franco Battiato	1
7	Novecento	1
7	Sandy Marton	1
7	Van Halen	1
