= People from Ibiza =

People from Ibiza may refer to:

- People from the Spanish island of Ibiza, see Ibiza § Notable people
- "People from Ibiza" (song), 1984 single by Sandy Marton
