= Valerie Dore =

Italian singer

- Born: Monica Stucchi; 28 May 1963 (age 63); Milan, Lombardy, Italy
- Occupation: Singer
- Website: valeriedore.it
- Musical career
- Genre: Italo disco
- Instrument: Vocals

Monica Stucchi (born 28 May 1963), known by her stage name Valerie Dore, is an Italian singer.

== Career ==
Monica Stucchi was born in Milan, Italy. Prior to her career in music, she worked as a graphic designer. In the early 1980s she fronted The Watermelon String Band, a bluegrass ensemble led by the banjoist Bruno Guaitamacchi that performed in the Milan clubs circuit.

Stucchi was discovered at age 20 by the Italo producer Roberto Gasparini, who launched her solo career and gave her the stage name Valerie Dore to improve her international appeal. Dore's first single, "The Night" (1984) was arranged by Lino Nicolosi. Her follow-up singles, "Get Closer" and "It's So Easy", were released in 1984 and 1985, respectively. Unsure about Dore's vocal abilities, Nicolosi hired professional singers like his then wife Dora Carofiglio and his sister Rossana Nicolosi (who at the time where members of Nicolosi's band Novecento) to perform on some of these tracks, among them the hit single "The night". In 1985, the weekly Italian entertainment news magazine TV Sorrisi e Canzoni ("TV Smiles and Songs") gave Valerie Dore the Best New Artist of the Year Award. The same year, she also finished second at Festivalbar and was invited to perform on the TV show "Azzurro" on Rai 2 and on German TV.

In 1986, Dore felt confident enough to perform all vocal duties herself. She began working with a new production team at Castello di Carimate on what would be her first album, The Legend. A team formed by Marco Tansini (music) and Simona Zanini (lyrics) wrote the ten songs that Dore performed for the album.

The album's first single, "Lancelot," was a hit in the Italian charts. The second single, "King Arthur," enjoyed moderate success in Europe, and Dore was invited to perform on the Italian music program Discoring. Other songs from the album that received significant radio play include "The Magic Rain" and "Bow and Arrow".

In 1986, Dore was voted the 6th best female artist in Italy by readers of TV Sorrisi e Canzoni. The following year, she changed production team again following a dispute over royalties, and moved to London to record her new single "Wrong Direction", in co-production with her future husband, Mauro Zavagli, for their new label "MZM PRODUCTION" (MauroZavagliMonica Production). Dore was aided in the studio by German producer Ralph Ruppert and collaborated with musicians Nick Beggs (of Kajagoogoo fame) and Mark Price. The record, however, suffered from serious underpromotion and only reached the #23 spot in the Italian charts.

Between 1990 and 1991, Dore and Zavagli lived in Madagascar, where they began collaborating with local musicians. Dore considered recording an album in Madagascar but she couldn't find support for the project in the music industry and eventually decided against the idea.

In 1992, the label ZYX released The Best of Valerie Dore with a few bonus tracks, including the extended versions of her dance hits "The Night", "Get Closer" and "It's So Easy," plus two remixes of "The Night" done by DJ Oliver Momm. In 1995, Zavagli and Dore moved to Arezzo, Toscana, where Dore started working as an antiquarian and restorer. The couple separated in 2000.

== Comeback ==
In November 2006, after a 15-year hiatus, Dore recorded a new song, "How do I get to Mars?". In 2007, she became a vocal anti-smoking campaigner. During an interview on Radio 24, she revealed that she had been smoking for 15 years, and how the habit had affected her voice. In 2007 she recorded more material in her home studio, which was eventually released in her 2014 album Greatest Hits & Remixes.

== Discography ==
=== Singles ===
- 1984 - "The Night" [#14 Italy, #8 Switzerland, #5 Germany, #23 France, #29 Austria]
- 1984 - "Get Closer" [#12 Germany, #12 Italy, #11 Switzerland, #33 France]
- 1985 - "It's So Easy" [#13 Italy, #10 Switzerland, #51 Germany]
- 1985 - "It's So Easy In The Night To Get Closer (Megamix)"
- 1986 - "Bow & Arrow"
- 1986 - "The Wizard"
- 1986 - "The Magic Rain"
- 1986 - "Guinnevere"
- 1986 - "King Arthur" [#26 Italy, #24 Switzerland]
- 1986 - "Lancelot" [#9 Italy, #36 Germany, #10 Switzerland]
- 1986 - "King Arthur"/"The Battle"
- 1987 - "The Sword Inside The Heart"
- 1987 - "The End Of The Story"
- 1988 - "On The Run"
- 1988 - "Wrong Direction" [#23 Italy]
- 2006 - "How do I get to Mars?"

=== Albums ===
- 1986 - The Legend
- 1992 - The Best Of Valerie Dore
- 2014 - Greatest Hits & Remixes
