= Happy Song (Baby's Gang song) =

1983 song by Baby's Gang

Single by Baby's Gang

from the album Challenger
- B-side: "Ice Cream"
- Released: 1983
- Genre: Italo disco
- Length: 3:20
- Label: Memory
- Songwriters: Larry Pignagnoli; Ivana Spagna; Ottavio Bacciocchi
- Producers: Alessandro Zanni; Stefano Cundari

Baby's Gang singles chronology
"Happy Song" (1983)	"Challenger" (1984)

Music video
- "Happy Song" on YouTube

"Happy Song" is a 1983 hit single by Italian disco music act Baby's Gang. The single became a European hit single when covered by German band Boney M. the following year.

== Track listing and formats ==
- Italian 7-inch single

A. "Happy Song" – 3:20
B. "Ice Cream" – 3:20

- Italian 12-inch single

A. "Happy Song" – 5:40
B. "Ice Cream" – 5:00

- German 7-inch single

A. "Happy Song" – 3:28
B. "Ice Cream" – 3:25

== Boney M. version ==
"Happy Song"

Single by Boney M. and Bobby Farrell with the School-Rebels
- B-side: "School's Out"
- Released: November 1984
- Genre: Eurodisco
- Length: 4:18
- Label: Hansa
- Songwriters: Larry Pignagnoli; Ivana Spagna; Ottavio Bacciocchi
- Producer: Frank Farian

Boney M. singles chronology
"Kalimba de Luna" (1984)	"Happy Song" (1984)	"My Chérie Amour" (1985)

Music video
- "Happy Song" on YouTube

After Boney M.'s return to the charts with a cover of the Italian hit "Kalimba de Luna", producer Frank Farian rushed back into the studio to cover another Italian hit single. He invited Boney M.'s original dancer Bobby Farrell to join the group, along with a group of children from Rhein-Main Air Base Elementary and Jr. High, credited as The School Rebels, who did the lead vocals together with Reggie Tsiboe.

While Bobby Farrell did a rap, original singers Liz Mitchell and Marcia Barrett did not participate in the recording. Session vocalists La Mama (Patricia Shockley, Madeleine Davis and Judy Cheeks) did the additional female vocals. The single gave the group their final German Top 10 hit single (#7), their first in nearly four years.

=== Track listing and formats ===
- European 7-inch single

A. "Happy Song" – 4:18
B. "School's Out" – 3:15

- European 12-inch maxi-single

A. "Happy Song" – 8:12
B. "School's Out" – 3:15

=== Charts ===
==== Weekly charts ====
Chart (1984–1985)	Peak position
Austria (Ö3 Austria Top 40)	15
Belgium (Ultratop 50 Flanders)	29
Switzerland (Schweizer Hitparade)	21
West Germany (GfK)	7
