= Moon Ray =

Raggio Di Luna (Moon Ray)
- Also known as: Raggio Di Luna
- Origin: Italy
- Genres: Italo disco
- Years active: 1980s
- Label: Il Discotto Records

Raggio Di Luna or Moon Ray is an Italo disco project which included producers Aldo Martinelli and Fabrizio Gatto, and singers Simona Zanini and Mandy Ligios (who also recorded as "Comancero"). They are known for the song "Comanchero" (1984, Discotto S.A.S), which was a hit across Europe, reaching number 3 in West Germany, number 2 in Austria, number 4 in Switzerland, and number 5 in France.

== Discography ==
=== Singles ===
Year	Title	Charts			
Year	Title	DE	AT	CH	FR
1984	"Comanchero"	3	2	4	5
1985	"Viva"				
1986	"Tornado Shout"				
2003	"Comanchero" (Tuareg feat. Raggio di Luna)				

== See also ==
- Martinelli
- Radiorama
- Topo & Roby
- List of Italo disco artists and songs
