= Talking to the Night =

1985 single by Brian Ice

Single by Brian Ice
- Released: 1984
- Genre: Italo disco
- Length: 4:10
- Label: Memory
- Songwriters: Fabrizio Rizzolo; Roberto Lajolo
- Producers: Alessandro Zanni; Stefano Cundari

Brian Ice singles chronology
"Talking to the Night" (1984)	"Tokyo" (1986)

Audio
- "Talking to the Night" on YouTube

"Talking to the Night" is an Italo disco hit song released in 1984 by Italian singer and actor Brian Ice (real name Fabrizio Rizzolo).

Written in one afternoon, the song turned out to be an unexpected success. Rizzolo would later return to acting, but he kept writing music for acts such as Tony Esposito and Gloria Gaynor.

== Track listing ==
- Italian 7-inch single

A. "Talking to the Night" – 4:10
B. "Talking to the Night" (Instrumental) – 4:20

- Italian 12-inch single

A. "Talking to the Night" – 6:00
B. "Talking to the Night" (Instrumental) – 6:12

- German 7-inch single

A. "Talking to the Night" – 3:45
B. "Talking to the Night" (Instrumental Version) – 3:34

- German 12-inch maxi single

A. "Talking to the Night" – 6:19
B. "Talking to the Night" (Instrumental Version) – 6:28
