= Sandy Martin =

Sandy Martin may refer to:

- Sandy Martin (actress), American actress, playwright, director and producer
- Sandy Martin (politician) (born 1957), British politician

== See also ==
- Sandy Martens (born 1972), Belgian football player
- Sandy Martínez (born 1970), Dominican baseball player
- Sandy Marton (born 1959), Croatian musician
