= Camel by Camel =

1985 single by Sandy Marton

Single by Sandy Marton
- B-side: "Camel by Camel (Instrumental)"
- Released: 1985
- Genre: Italo disco
- Length: 3:23
- Label: CBS
- Songwriters: Sandy Marton; Daniele Cimitan; Guido Vianello
- Producer: Claudio Cecchetto

Sandy Marton singles chronology
"People from Ibiza" (1984)	"Camel by Camel" (1985)	"Exotic and Erotic" (1985)

"Camel by Camel" is a song recorded by Italy-based Croatian singer Sandy Marton.

== Track listing and formats ==
- Italian 7-inch single

A. "Camel by Camel" – 3:23
B. "Camel by Camel" (instrumental) – 3:23

- Italian 12-inch single

A. "Camel by Camel" (vocal) – 5:45
B. "Camel by Camel" (instrumental) – 6:02

- German 7-inch single

A. "Camel by Camel" – 3:23
B. "Camel by Camel" (instrumental) – 3:25

- German 12-inch maxi-single

A. "Camel by Camel" – 5:45
B. "Camel by Camel" (instrumental) – 6:02

== Credits and personnel ==
- Sandy Marton – songwriter, vocals
- Daniele Cimitan – songwriter
- Guido Vianello – songwriter
- Claudio Cecchetto – producer
- Jürgen Koppers – mixing
- Celso Valli – arranger
- Jacek Pereswiet Soltan – cover art, photographer
- Maurizio Marani – cover art designer

Credits and personnel adapted from the 7-inch single liner notes.

== Charts ==
Weekly chart performance for "Camel by Camel"
Chart (1985)	Peak position
Italy (Musica e dischi)	5

== Usage in media ==
The song is most infamous for its use in a pornographic animated video featuring Ankha from the Nintendo video game series Animal Crossing, with the song playing throughout the whole video. The video was then cropped and used as an "if you know, you know" style of Internet meme, with people playing along with the joke, saying that she was just dancing.
