= Fake (Swedish band) =

Swedish synthpop band

- Origin: Sweden
- Genres: New wave; synth-pop; Italodisco; Electronic
- Years active: 1977–1985
- Labels: Sound of Scandinavia; Mega Records; CGD; Lacerate Music; Il Discotto Records
- Past members: Erik Strömblad; Ulrica Örn; Tony Wilhelmsson; Stefan Bogstedt; Janne Fagerberg; Mikael Olsson; Stefan Sverin

Fake was a Swedish synthpop band during the 1980s, best known for their hits "Donna Rouge" and "Brick".

== History ==
Fake was formed when two Swedish musicians, Erik Strömblad and Stefan Bogstedt, founded their own band, then called Size 46, in 1977. The band grew over the next few years, with metal drummer Stefan Sverin and singers Tony Wilhelmsson and Ulrika Örn being added to the lineup, and with more synthesizers added to their rock music sound. Stefan Sverin moved on as a session drummer for various acts such as American actor Cliff Taylor and Claes Muncktell from Dave and the Mistakes. He has since given up drumming and is now working as an Art Director in Stockholm.

The group's second single, "Donna Rouge", was a major hit in Italy and the remix became a disco classic. The band's only album, New Art, was released in 1984. The following year, the band performed on the Discoring television show and Festivalbar in 1985. Another single, "Brick", was also released in 1985, becoming a big success internationally, reaching #1 in Italy and #6 in France. For the official music video for "Brick", neither Tony Wilhelmsson nor Ulrika Örn were available to sing, so the video was filmed with guitarist Erik Strömblad and friend Lenita Rydberg miming to the words.

After the recording of "Brick", the band split up, but in 2001, plans were made for a reformation. However, the reunion never materialized.

== Discography ==
=== Albums ===
- New Art (1984)

=== Singles ===
- "Dreamgirl"/"Warlord" (1981)
- "Donna Rouge" (1983)
- "Right" (1984)
- "Memories of Pan"/"Frogs in Spain" (1984)
- "Arabian Toys" (1984)
- "Brick" (1985)
