= Wild Romance =

Wild Romance may refer to:-

- Wild Romance (band), also known as Herman Brood & his Wild Romance, backing band of Dutch singer-pianist Herman Brood
- Wild Romance (film), a 2006 biopic about Dutch singer and artist Herman Brood
- Wild Romance (TV series), a 2012 South Korean drama series
- A Wild Romance, a 1983 album by The Twins
