= Miko Mission =

Italian singer

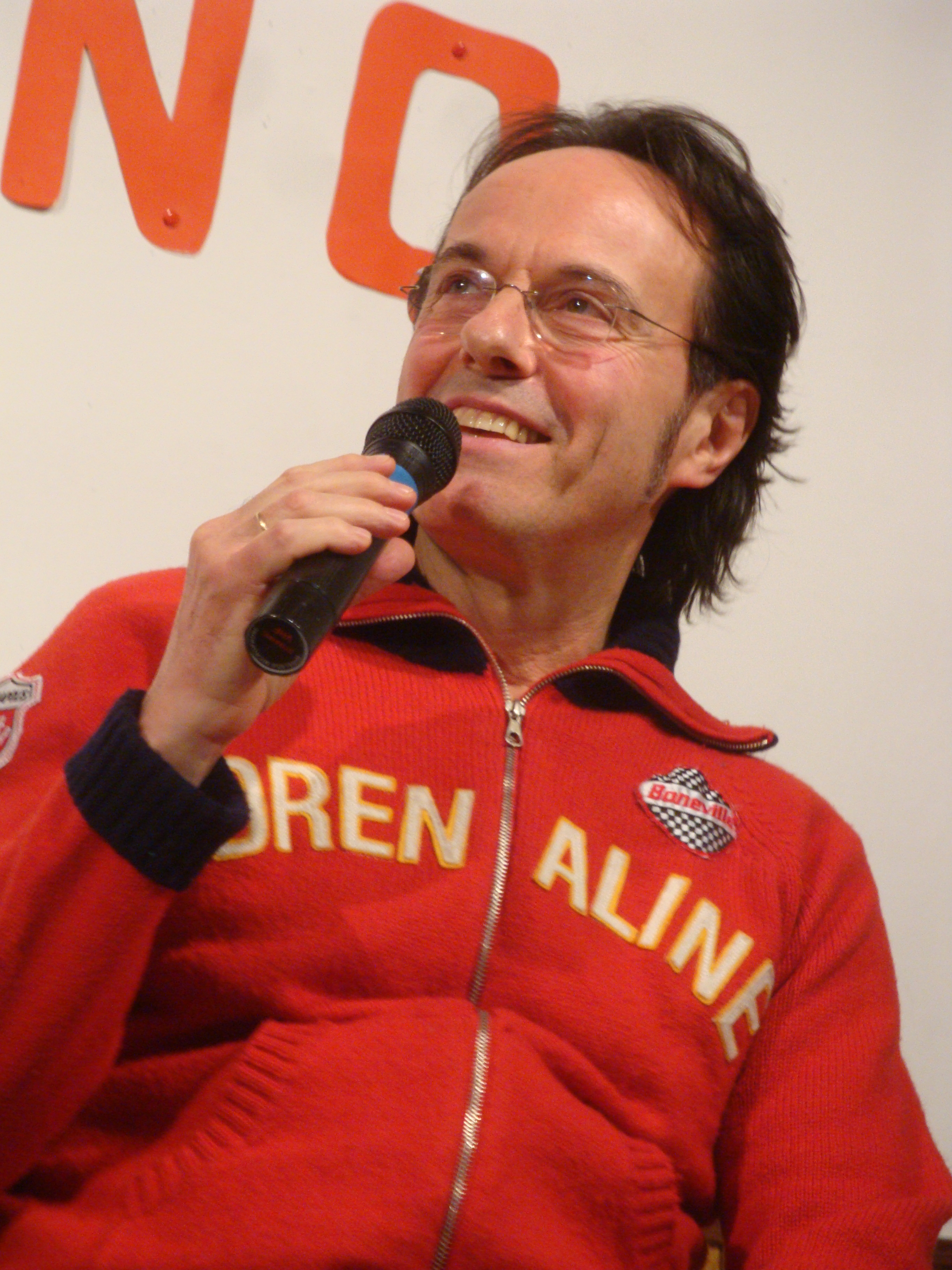
- Mission in December 2009

Background information
- Born: Pier Michele Bozzetti; 22 June 1945 (age 81); Alessandria, Piedmont, Kingdom of Italy
- Occupation: Singer
- Years active: 1964–present
- Musical career
- Genres: Italo disco; pop; Eurodance
- Instrument: Vocals
- Labels: Ariston; ZYX; Il Discotto

Pier Michele Bozzetti (born 22 June 1945), known by his stage name Miko Mission, is an Italian singer.

== Career ==
The career of Miko Mission began at a young age, performing as a singer in a comedy titled "Gelindo", represented in Alessandria, Italy at age seven. At age fourteen, Miko formed his first band 'I passi per la Musica', later renamed 'Oscars'. The group participated in several singing competitions including Flip for San Remo held in Venice – Lido. Miko won the competition and went on to sign a contract with Ariston Records in 1964. Adopting the stage name Don Miko, he debuted with "45 Gente... che ragazza!" and later "Non hai più niente per me", which became a summer hit. In 1965 he entered the Sanremo Music Festival with the song "E poi verrà l'Autunno", in couple with Timi Yuro, failing to access the final.

In the 1970s, he recorded some songs with the name Pier Bozzetti, achieving good critical reviews. In 1976 he came back to Sanremo Festival, credited as Miko, with the song "Signora Mia". Pier reached the peak of his popularity during the 1980s under the stage name Miko Mission with Italo disco hits like "How Old Are You?". Master Blaster produced a remix of the song in 2003 on their album We Love Italo Disco. In the same year "The World Is You" was remixed by Italo Allstars.

== Discography ==
- "How Old Are You?" (1984)
- "The World Is You" [#35 Germany] (1984)
- "Two For Love" [#14 Sweden] (1985)
- "Strip Tease" (1986)
- "Toc Toc Toc" (1987)
- "I Like A Woman's Heart" (1987)
- "I Believe" (1988)
- "One Step To Heaven" (1989)
- "Rock Me Round The World" (1989)
- "I Can Fly" (1993)
- "Mr. Blue" (1996)
- "Let It Be Love" (2010)
- "Universal Feeling" (2014)
- "Do You Wanna Dance" (2020)

== Sources ==
- Anselmi, Eddy (2009). Festival di Sanremo: almanacco illustrato della canzone italiana. Panini Comics. ISBN 978-8863462296.
