= Dragon's Legend =

Single by Koto
- B-side: "Dub Mix"
- Released: 1988
- Length: 6:54 (12"); 4:00 (7")
- Label: Memory Records
- Songwriter: Anfrando Maiola
- Producer: Stefano Cundari

Koto singles chronology
| "Jabdah" (1986) | "Dragon's Legend" (1988) | "Time" (1989) |

"Dragon's Legend" is a song recorded by Italian group Koto. Released in 1988, it was their second and final single that charted, reaching No. 20 in the Netherlands. It contains samples from the 1983 video game Dragon's Lair. Later in the year, a remixed version called "Dragon's Megamix" was released.

== Reception ==
In his book In Pista!, Italian writer Rocco Bargioni states that “Koto’s songs are the kind of classics that, as soon as you discover them, make you wonder how on earth you managed to live without them until then.” Analyzing Koto's discography, he adds that “while Chinese Revenge evokes the mood of a vintage video game, in Dragon's Legend a vintage video game is directly sampled.”
