= Stanley Jordan =

American jazz guitarist (born 1959)

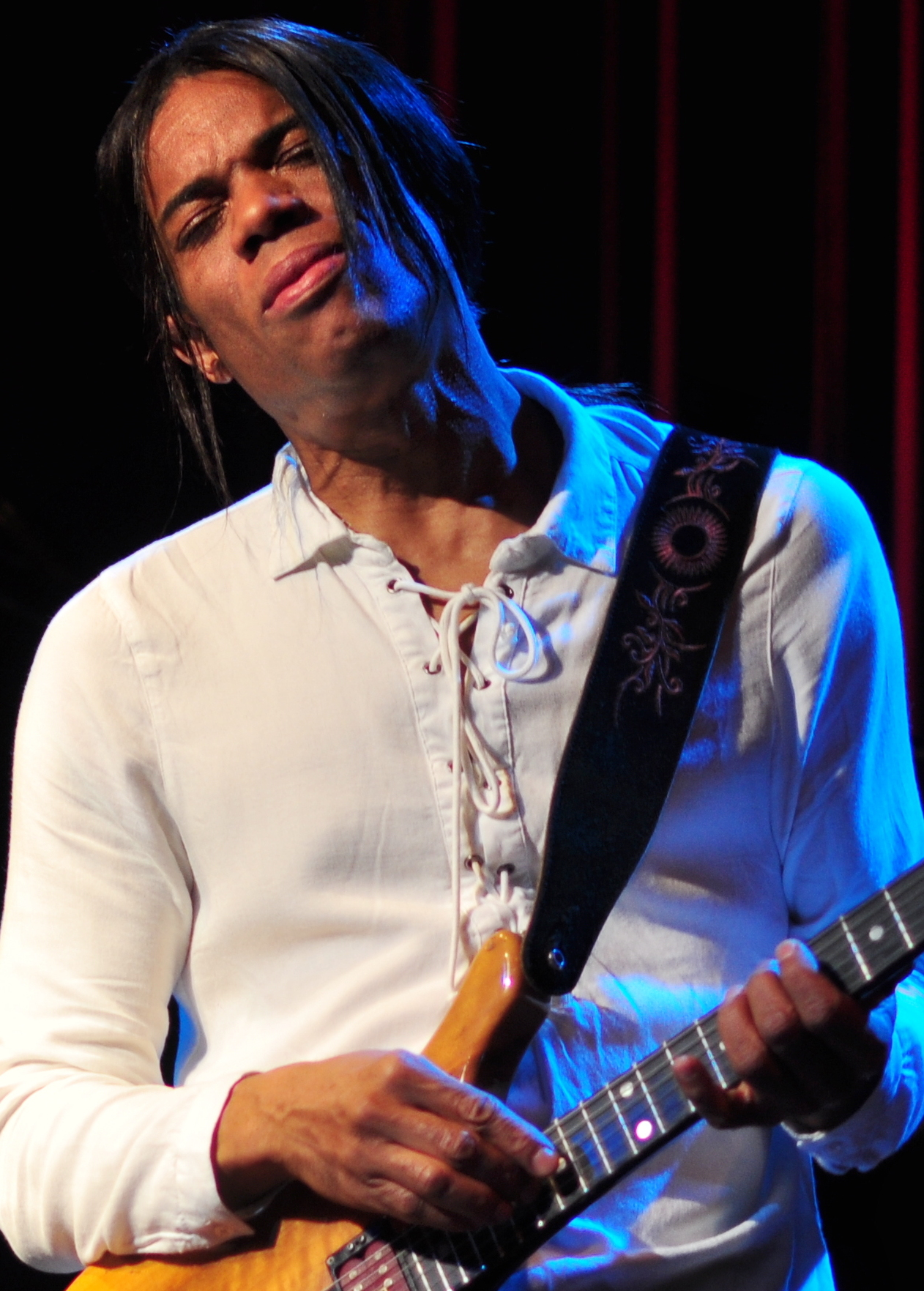
- Stanley Jordan, October 3, 2017

Background information
- Born: July 31, 1959 (age 67); Chicago, Illinois, U.S.
- Genres: Jazz, jazz fusion
- Occupation: Musician
- Instrument: Guitar
- Years active: 1982–present
- Labels: Blue Note/Capitol/EMI, Arista/BMG, Mack Avenue
- Website: www.stanleyjordan.com

Stanley Jordan (born July 31, 1959) is an American jazz guitarist noted for his playing technique, which involves tapping his fingers on the fretboard of the guitar with both hands.

== Music career ==
Jordan was born in Chicago, Illinois, United States. When he was six, he started on piano, then at eleven switched to guitar. He later began playing in rock and soul bands. In 1976, he won an award at the Reno Jazz Festival. At Princeton University, he studied music theory and composition with Milton Babbitt and computer music with Paul Lansky. He also took freshman calculus with Edward Nelson. While at Princeton, he played also with Benny Carter and Dizzy Gillespie.

In 1985, Bruce Lundvall became president of Blue Note Records and Stanley Jordan was the first person he signed. The label released his album Magic Touch, which sat at No.1 on Billboard's jazz chart for 51 weeks, setting a record.

=== Touch technique ===
Normally, a guitarist uses two hands to play each note. One hand presses down a guitar string behind a chosen fret to prepare the note, and the other hand either plucks or strums the string to play that note. Jordan's touch technique is an advanced form of two-handed tapping. The guitarist produces a note using only one finger by quickly tapping (or hammering) his finger down on the appropriate fret. The impact causes the string to vibrate enough to sound the note, and the volume can be controlled by varying the force of impact. Jordan taps with both hands, and more legato than is normally associated with guitar tapping. His technique allows the guitarist to play melody and chords simultaneously. It is also possible, as he has demonstrated, to play simultaneously on two different guitars, as well as guitar and piano.

He plays guitar in all-fourths tuning, from bass to treble EADGCF (all in perfect fourths as on the bass guitar) rather than the standard EADGBE. He has stated that all-fourths tuning "simplifies the fingerboard, making it logical".

Jordan's main guitar was built by Vigier Guitars in 1984: it is an Arpege model on which Vigier made a flat fingerboard, allowing it to have a very low action (0.5/0.7mm). The low action facilitates the tapping technique.

=== Recording ===
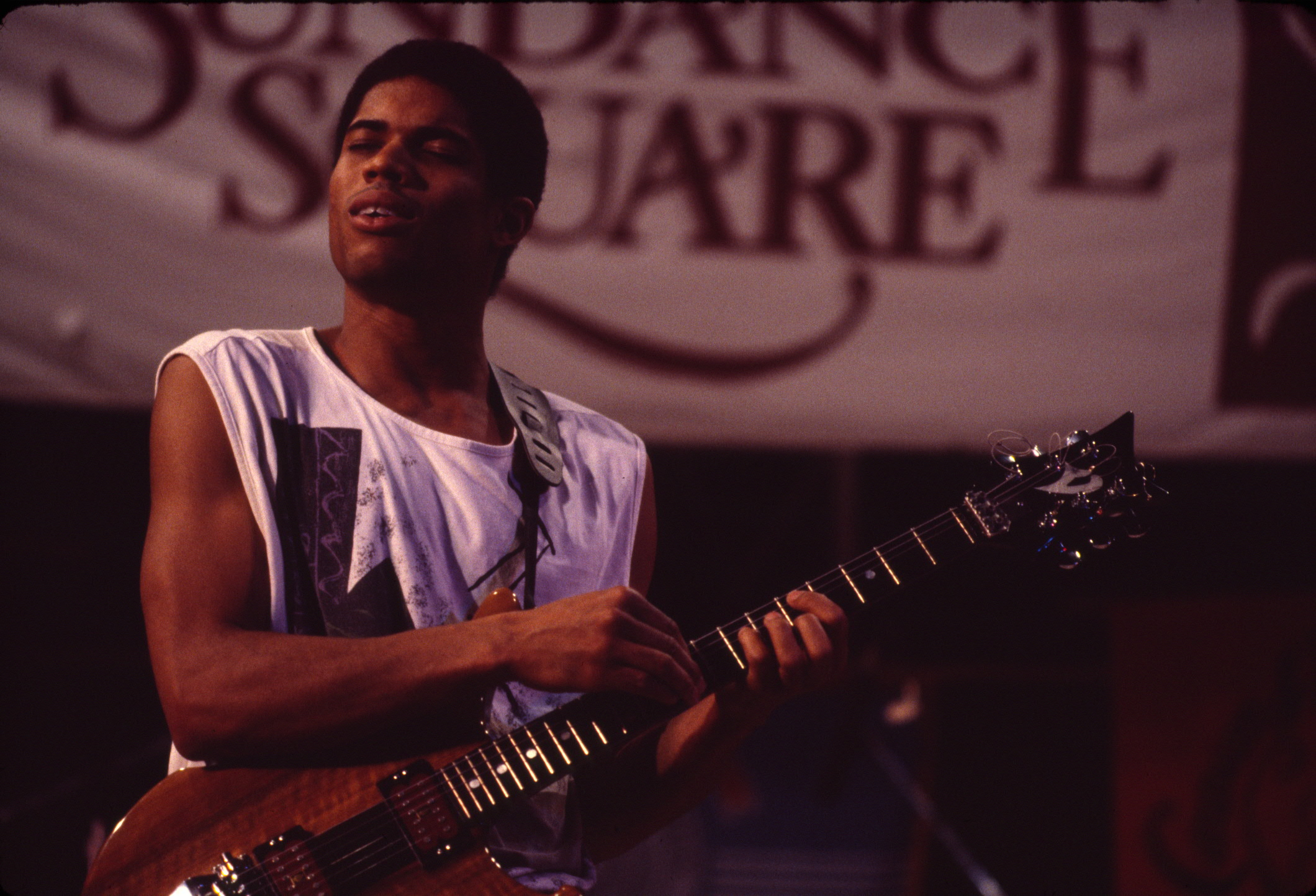
Stanley Jordan, 1989.

Among the artists Jordan has worked with are Quincy Jones, Stanley Clarke, Onaje Allan Gumbs, Michal Urbaniak, Richie Cole, The Dave Matthews Band, The String Cheese Incident, Phil Lesh, Moe, and Umphrey's McGee.

He has performed at many jazz festivals, including Kool Jazz Festival (1984), Concord Jazz Festival (1985), and the Montreux International Jazz Festival (1985).

In 2004, he released the album Dreams of Peace with the Italian band Novecento. The album was produced by Lino Nicolosi and Pino Nicolosi at Nicolosi Productions and was released in the U.S. on Favored Nations. He signed with Mack Avenue Records and released State of Nature in 2008 and Friends in 2011. The latter was nominated for an NAACP Image Award. He has four Grammy nominations. Jordan made the startup sound for the Macintosh computer models the Power Macintosh 6100, Power Macintosh 7100, and Power Macintosh 8100.

=== Film and television ===
Jordan made a cameo appearance in the movie Blind Date (1987). In 1995 he wrote the score for the short film One Red Rose. In 1996 he wrote the score for the ABC TV afternoon special, Daddy's Girl.

Since the mid-1980s he has performed on numerous television shows, including The Tonight Show with Johnny Carson, The David Letterman Show and the Grammy Awards.

== Personal life ==
Stanley Jordan was briefly married and has one daughter, Julia Jordan, who is a singer and songwriter.

In a 2023 interview, Jordan praised author and then-presidential candidate Marianne Williamson for "bringing politics into the 21st-century".

== Discography ==
=== As leader ===
- Touch Sensitive (Tangent, 1982)
- Magic Touch (Blue Note, 1985)
- Standards Vol. 1 (Blue Note, 1986)
- Flying Home (EMI-Manhattan, 1988)
- Cornucopia (Blue Note, 1990)
- Stolen Moments (Blue Note, 1991)
- Bolero (Arista, 1994)
- Live in New York (Blue Note, 1998)
- Dreams of Peace (Nicolosi, 2003)
- Relaxing Music for Difficult Situations I (Manifold Music, 2003)
- State of Nature (Mack Avenue, 2008)
- New Morning: The Paris Concert (Inakustik, 2008)
- Friends (Mack Avenue, 2011)
- Duets with Kevin Eubanks (Mack Avenue, 2015)

=== As sideman ===
- Muriel Anderson & Phil Keaggy, Uncut Gems (CGD Music, 2003)
- Muriel Anderson, Wildcat (Heartstrings Attached Music, 2005)
- Burt Bacharach, Blue Note Plays Burt Bacharach (Blue Note, 2004)
- Anthony Branker, For the Children (RPC, 1980)
- Dennis Chambers, Groove and More (Soul Trade, 2013)
- Stanley Clarke, Hideaway (Epic, 1986)
- Billy Cobham, Drum 'n' Voice Vol. 4 (Nicolosi, 2016)
- Stu Gardner, Presents Total Happiness: Music from the Bill Cosby Show Vol. II (Columbia, 1987)
- Rebbie Jackson, R U Tuff Enuff (Columbia, 1988)
- Charnett Moffett, Net Man (Blue Note, 1987)
- Charnett Moffett, Treasure (Motema, 2010)
- Charnett Moffett, Music from Our Soul (Motema, 2017)
- Novecento, Secret (Nicolosi, 2008)
- Kenny Rogers, The Heart of the Matter (RCA, 1985)
- Dionne Warwick, Sings Cole Porter (Arista, 1990)
- Muriel Anderson & Phil Keaggy, Precious Gems (Independent Release, 2020)

== Bibliography ==
- Ferguson, Jim (October 1985). "Stanley Jordan: Revolutionizing Guitar With The Touch System". Guitar Player. Vol. 19, no. 10. Cupertino, CA. pp. 82–83, 85–86, 88, 93–94, 96, 149. ISSN 0017-5463.
