= Radiorama =

Italian disco group

- Origin: Italy
- Genres: Italo disco; Eurobeat; Eurodance
- Years active: 1984–2002; 2005
- Labels: Radiorama Productions; SAIFAM
- Past members: Mauro Farina; Elena Ferretti; Antonella Ferri

Radiorama were an Italian Italo disco band formed in 1984 by Simona Zanini and Aldo Martinelli. They were later joined by Mauro Farina and Giuliano Crivellente. Their first two singles, "Chance to Desire" and "Desire" were European hits.

== Discography ==
=== Studio albums ===
Title	Year	Peak chart positions		
Title	Year	AUT	SWE	SWI
Desires and Vampires	1986	—	—	12
The 2nd Album	1987	17	33	17
The Legend	1988	—	—	30
Four Years After	1989	—	—	—
The Fifth	1990	—	—	—
The World of Radiorama	1999	—	—	—
Yesterday Today Tomorrow	2002	—	—	—
"—" denotes a recording that did not chart or was not released in that territory.

=== Compilation albums ===
- The First Album (1988)
- The Best of Radiorama (1989)
- Golden Hits (1996)
- The Ultimate Collection 1984-1998 (1998)
- The Greatest Hits (2000)
- Greatest Hits and Remixes (2015)

=== Singles ===
Title	Year	Peak chart positions		Album
Title	Year	GER	SWI	Album
"Chance to Desire"	1985	—	18	Desires and Vampires
"Desire"	1986	—	17	Desires and Vampires
"Hey Hey"	1986	—	—	Desires and Vampires
"Vampires"	1986	—	5	Desires and Vampires
"Aliens"	1986	25	5	The 2nd Album
"Yeti"	1987	—	6	The 2nd Album
"So I Know"	1988	—	—	The 2nd Album
"Fire"	1988	—	16	The Legend
"Manitù"	1988	—	—	The Legend
"ABCD"	1988	—	19	The Legend
"Bad Girls"	1988	—	—	The Legend
"Heartbreaker"	1988	—	—	The Legend
"Daddy Daddy"	1989	—	—	Four Years After
"Come Back My Lover"	1991	-	-	
"Let Me Be"	1995	—	—	The World of Radiorama
"—" denotes a recording that did not chart or was not released in that territory.

== See also ==
- Martinelli (band)
- Raggio Di Luna (Moon Ray)
- Topo & Roby
