= How Old Are You? (Miko Mission song) =

1984 single by Miko Mission

Single by Miko Mission
- B-side: "How Old Are You? (Instrumental Version)"
- Released: 1984
- Genre: Italo disco
- Length: 7:15
- Label: Blow Up Disco
- Songwriter(s): Graziano Pegoraro; Tony Carrasco
- Producer(s): Tony Carrasco

Miko Mission singles chronology
"The World is You" (1984)	"How Old Are You?" (1984)	"Two for Love" (1985)

Music video
- "How Old Are You?" on YouTube

"How Old Are You?" is a 1984 Italo disco song by Italian singer Miko Mission. It was the biggest hit from the artist.
