= Vicio Latino =

Madrid musical group

Vicio Latino is a Eurodance act from Madrid, Spain. They started out as a studio act consisting of Miguel Angel Arenas (producer), and Pedro Vidal (also known as a producer as RT-1 (Ivan, Dj Ventura Mr Backer)).

In 1983 they released the single "¿Qué Me Pasa, Qué Me Pasa?" a Euro disco song that included different sections each with a different tempo, all based on synthesizers and electronic drums. It was a minor Eurodance hit. The chorus was sung in Spanish by female vocalists, while male vocals were sung in an invented language imitating English-language phonetics in the style of American funk singers (somewhat like the later hit "Asereje" by Las Ketchup, or previously Tom Tom Club's "Wordy Rappinghood").

In 1984 they released "¿Sabes qué hora es?", also by the Spanish subsidiary of the label Epic, another Eurodance song recorded in Doublewtronics studios in Madrid. The 12" Maxi contains "Sabes que hora es?" (12" version), "Horario disco", and "Sabes que hora es (versión casual)". It is sung in Spanish, English and Italian. Flamenco guitarist Raimundo Amador collaborated on the song. The song reproduces a three-section structure as in "¿Qué Me Pasa, Qué Me Pasa?" (a modern version of a three-movement suite). One section is the vocal version of the B-side track "Horario disco".

== Discography ==
- "¿Qué Me Pasa, Qué Me Pasa?" (Epic – 1983 )
- "¿Sabes qué hora es?" (Epic – 1984 )
