= Ballet Dancer (song) =

Single by the Twins

from the album A Wild Romance
- Released: 1984
- Genre: Pop; synth-pop
- Length: 3:25
- Label: Hansa International
- Songwriters: Ronny Schreinzer; Sven Dohrow
- Producers: Ronny Schreinzer; Sven Dohrow

The Twins singles chronology
"Not the Loving Kind" (1983)	"Ballet Dancer" (1984)	"Love System" (1984)

Official audio
- "Ballet Dancer" on YouTube

"Ballet Dancer" is a song by the German synth-pop duo the Twins, released as both a 7" and 12" single from their third studio album, A Wild Romance (1983). The band's best selling single, it peaked at No. 19 in their home country of Germany, and at No. 10 in Switzerland, and No. 3 in Italy.

== Track listing ==
7" single

1. "Ballet Dancer" – 3:25
2. "Heaven in Your Smile" – 5:54

12" single

1. "Ballet Dancer (Long Version)" – 4:50
2. "Criminal Love (Instrumental)" – 3:50
3. "Heaven in Your Smile" – 5:54

== Chart performance ==
Chart	Position
Australia (Kent Music Report)	84
Germany (GfK)	19
Italy (Musica e Dischi)	3
Switzerland (Schweizer Hitparade)	10
