= List of Eurodisco artists =

This is a list of Eurodisco artists.

- Arabesque
- Bad Boys Blue
- Bananarama
- Blue System
- Bolland & Bolland
- Boney M
- C. C. Catch
- Creative Connection
- Danuta Lato
- Début de Soirée
- Desireless
- Digital Emotion
- Fancy
- Giorgio Moroder
- Images
- Jeanne Mas
- Joy
- Linda Jo Rizzo
- Lian Ross
- London Boys
- Madleen Kane
- Magazine 60
- Modern Talking
- Mike Mareen
- Mixed Emotions
- Monte Kristo
- Mozzart
- New Baccara
- Patty Ryan
- Sandra
- Silent Circle
- Susana Estrada
- Sweet Connection
- Systems in Blue
- Thomas Anders
- Vicio Latino
