= Pictures of Old Days =

Studio album by Scotch
- Released: 1987
- Genre: Italo disco; synth-pop
- Length: 38:53
- Label: Many Records
- Producer: David Zambelli; Walter Zambelli

Scotch chronology
| Evolution (1985) | Pictures of Old Days (1987) | Best of Scotch (1992) |

Singles from Pictures of Old Days
- 1. "Mirage" Released: 1986; 2. "Money Runner" Released: 1986; 3. "Pictures" Released: 1987

Pictures of Old Days is the second and final studio album by the Italian Italo disco band Scotch. It was released in 1987.

== Track listing ==
Side one
| No. | Title | Writer(s) | Length |
|---|---|---|---|
| 1. | "Plus Plus" | Vincenzo Lancini; Fabio Margutti; David Zambelli; Gabriele Balducci | 5:19 |
| 2. | "Rhythm of Love" | Lancini; Margutti; Walter Zambelli | 3:18 |
| 3. | "Pictures" | Lancini; Margutti; D. Zambelli | 5:22 |
| 4. | "Over the Rainbow" | Harold Arlen; Yip Harburg | 3:52 |
| Total length: | | | 17:51 |

Side one
| No. | Title | Writer(s) | Length |
|---|---|---|---|
| 1. | "Mirage" | Lancini; Margutti; D. Zambelli | 3:54 |
| 2. | "Caribbean Lady" | Lancini; Margutti; D. Zambelli | 4:45 |
| 3. | "Amor Por Victoria" | Lancini; Margutti; W. Zambelli | 4:49 |
| 4. | "Money Runner" | Margutti; W. Zambelli; Naimy Hackett | 6:19 |
| 5. | "Land of Silence" | Lancini; Margutti; Franz Felleti | 1:15 |
| Total length: | | | 21:02 |

== Personnel ==
Scotch

- Vince Lancini – lead and backing vocals
- Fabio Margutti – keyboards, piano
- Franz Rome – keyboards

Additional musicians

- Marcello Merlini – background vocals on "Plus Plus"

Production

- David Zambelli – producer
- Walter Zambelli – producer
- Massimo Noè – engineer, mixing

Artwork

- R. Monachesi – design

== Charts ==
| Chart (1987) | Peak position |
|---|---|
| Swedish Albums (Sverigetopplistan) | 23 |
