= Chinese Revenge =

Single by Koto
- B-side: "Dub Mix"
- Released: 1982 (Original Cellophane Record 12"); 1983 (Memory Records Release 7" & 12")
- Recorded: 1982
- Genre: Synth-pop; Italo-disco; downtempo
- Length: 6:18 (12"); 3:35 (7"); 7:07 (New Mix); 4:57 (Asia Version-89)
- Label: Cellophane Record (1982); Memory Records (1983)
- Songwriter: Anfrando Maiola
- Producers: Stefano Cundari, Alessandro Zanni

Koto singles chronology
"Chinese Revenge" (1982)	"Japanese War Game" (1983)

Chinese Revenge is a song performed by Italian synth-pop group Koto. Released in 1982, it was their debut single. Composed by Anfrando Maiola, and produced by Stefano Cundari and Alessandro Zanni, it proved a big hit in Italy, selling over 10,000 copies. Unlike Koto's next batch of singles, "Chinese Revenge" is more of a downtempo track, rather than a high-energy italo-disco song. In 1985, the song was remixed by Marc Hartman, and again in 1989 by Michiel van der Kuy, with a more house flavour.

== Reception ==
In his book In Pista!, Italian writer Rocco Bargioni states that “Koto’s songs are the kind of classics that, as soon as you discover them, make you wonder how on earth you managed to live without them until then.” He adds that “Chinese Revenge evokes the mood of a vintage video game.”

== Track listings ==
=== 12" single ===
- 1. Chinese Revenge (Club Mix) (6:18)
- 2. Chinese Revenge (Dub Mix) (6:00)

=== 7" single ===
- 1. Chinese Revenge (Club Mix) (3:35)
- 2. Chinese Revenge (Dub Mix) (3:35)

=== 1985 12" single ===
- 1. Chinese Revenge (New Mix) (7:07)
- 2. Chinese Revenge (Club Mix) (6:18)
- 3. Chinese Revenge (Dub Mix) (6:00)

=== Asia version-89 CD/12" ===
- 1. Chinese Revenge (Asia Version-89) (4:57)
- 2. Chinese Revenge (Original Version-83) (6:18)

=== Asia version-89 Maxi ===
- 1. Chinese Revenge (Asia Version-89)
- 2. The Samples (0:40)
- 3. Chinese Revenge (Original Version-83) (6:18)
- 4. Chinese Revenge (Edited Asia Version-89) (3:50)
