= Jonas Ekfeldt =

Swedish music producer and singer

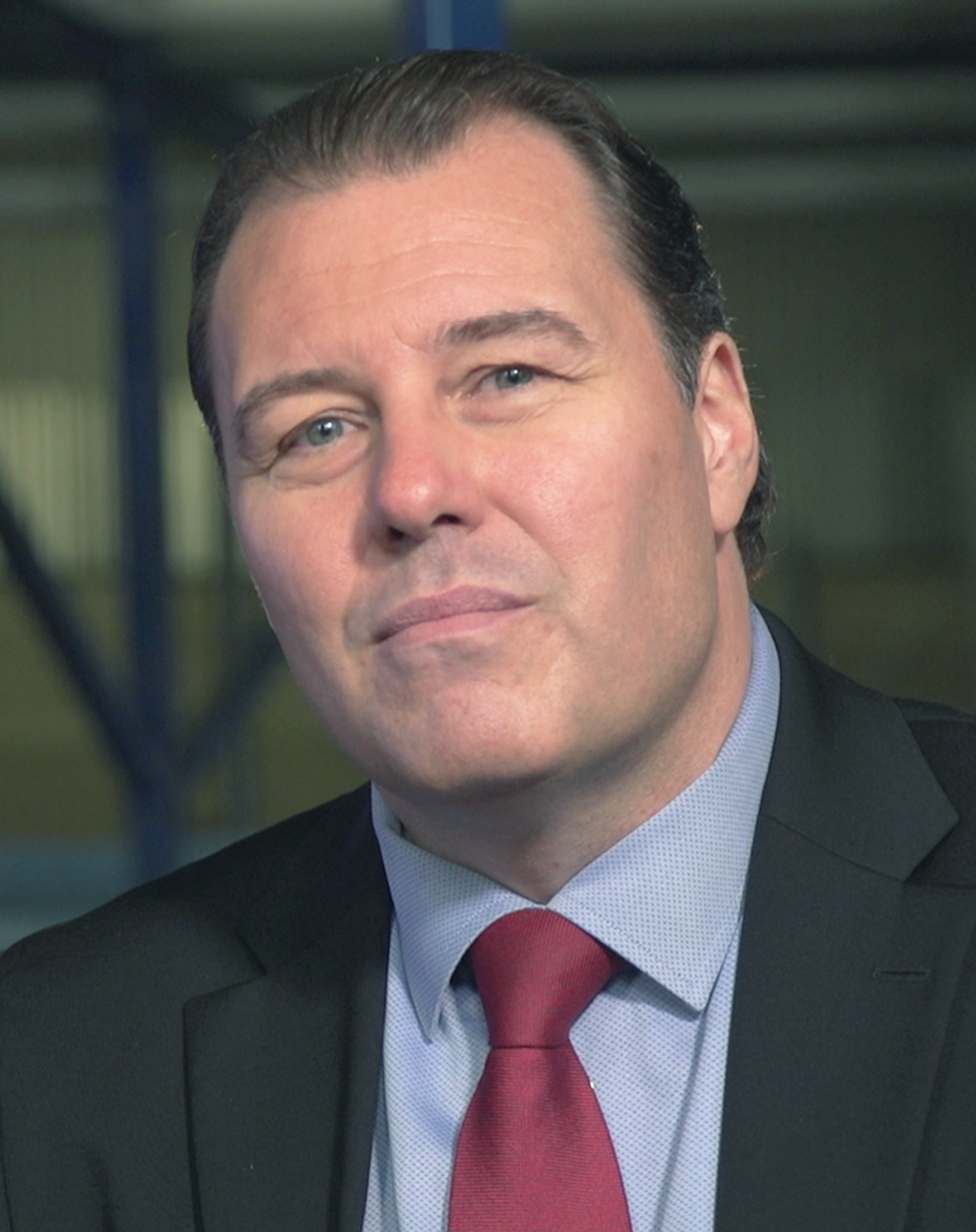
Jonas Ekfeldt

Jonas Ekfeldt (born 29 June 1971) is a Swedish music producer and singer. In 1996, using the name Robin Cook, he released the single "I Won't Let the Sun Go Down" (a cover of Nik Kershaw's 1983 debut "I Won't Let the Sun Go Down on Me") followed by a cover of Raggio Di Luna's "Comanchero" and the album Land of Sunshine in 1997.

Ekfeldt sang and produced "I Won't Let the Sun Go Down" and all subsequent releases under the name Robin Cook, but appointed Manuel Manci to front and perform, thinking he himself lacked time. The truth of who really was the singer was kept secret until Swedish newspaper Aftonbladet ran an article in 2002. Yet another single was released in 2002 under the name Robin Cook, titled "Susanna" with Ekfeldt on the cover.

Following his musical career, Ekfeldt has pursued a career in law, completing a doctoral thesis in 2016 on the use of digital evidence within Swedish law. He is now the CEO of Altalex, a company specialising in media and IT law, and digital streaming and production.

== Sampled by Sveriges Radio ==
Ekfeldt filed a lawsuit against, and won over, Sveriges Radio for sampling "I Won't Let the Sun Go Down".

== Discography ==
=== Album ===
- Land of Sunshine (1997) (Stockholm/Universal) - SWE No. 14

=== Singles ===
- "I Won't Let the Sun Go Down" (1996) - SWE No. 3, FIN No. 16
- "Comanchero" (with Bluedream) (1997) - SWE No. 5
- "Caravan of Love" (1998)
- "Susanna" (2002)
