= The Night (Valerie Dore song) =

1984 single by Valerie Dore

Single by Valerie Dore
- B-side: "The Night (Instrumental)"
- Released: 1984
- Genre: Italo disco
- Length: 4:00
- Label: Merak
- Songwriter(s): Giuseppe Nicolosi; Barbara Addoms
- Producer(s): Lino Nicolosi; Roberto Gasparini

Valerie Dore singles chronology
"The Night" (1984)	"Get Closer" (1984)

"The Night" is the debut single by the Italian singer Valerie Dore, released in 1984, under the label Merak Music.

== Track listing and formats ==
- Italian 7-inch single

A. "The Night" – 4:00
B. "The Night" (Instrumental) – 3:30

- Italian 12-inch single

A. "The Night" – 5:46
B. "The Night" (Instrumental) – 5:39

- German 7-inch single

A. "The Night" (Vocal) – 3:28
B. "The Night" (Instrumental) – 3:27

- German 12-inch maxi-single

A. "The Night" (Vocal) – 6:20
B. "The Night" (Instrumental) – 5:30

== Charts ==
=== Weekly charts ===
Weekly chart performance for "The Night"
Chart (1984–1985)	Peak position
Austria (Ö3 Austria Top 40)	26
France (SNEP)	23
Italy (Musica e dischi)	22
Switzerland (Schweizer Hitparade)	8
West Germany (GfK)	5

=== Year-end charts ===
Year-end chart performance for "The Night"
Chart (1985)	Position
France (SNEP)	96
West Germany (Official German Charts)	33
