= Flying Home (Stanley Jordan album) =

Studio album by Stanley Jordan
- Released: 1988
- Genre: Jazz
- Label: EMI/Manhattan Records
- Producer: David Conley, Stanley Jordan, Preston Glass

Stanley Jordan chronology
Standards Vol. 1 (1986)	Flying Home (1988)	Cornucopia (1990)

Flying Home is a studio album by guitarist Stanley Jordan, released in 1988 on EMI/Manhattan Records. The album peaked at No. 6 on the US Billboard Top Contemporary Jazz albums chart.

== Critical reception ==
Professional ratings
Review scores
Source	Rating
AllMusic	2.5/5 stars

Alfred L. King of the Atlanta Journal Constitution proclaimed "Flying Home finds Stanley Jordan treading confidently and convincingly into the waters of contemporary jazz music...producer Preston Glass fills the album with lots of little aural and percussive effects in unexpected spaces to create a tapestry of modern guitar innovation, anchored by Mr. Jordan's solid playing...It's a mainly upbeat, hard-charging LP propelled by lightning guitar licks. But Mr. Jordan also shows a deft touch with ballads."

UPI favourably found, "Stanley Jordan has gone funky, and it is a pleasant departure from his solo guitar work...His playing tips the hat to Wes Montgomery and George Benson. There are even shades of Carlos Santana's sound on 'When Julia Smiles.' Jordan's unique piano-like technique of tapping the strings on the fretboard takes a back seat to pure picking on most cuts that is hard-rocking at times."

Scott Yanow of AllMusic, in a 2.5/5-star review, dismissively declared, "Stanley Jordan switches largely to funk and pop on this disappointing set...Most of the tunes are his originals (other than "Stairway to Heaven") and fall way outside of jazz, being not even good rock."

Mark Marymont of USA Today with praise wrote, "This is a bit funkier than some other Jordan releases, featuring snappy cuts like "Street Talk," "Can't Sit Down" and the down and dirty "Brooklyn At Midnight"."

== Track listing ==
No.	Title	Writer(s)	Length
1.	"Street Talk"	Preston Glass, Lionel Job, Stanley Jordan	5:05
2.	"Tropical Storm"	Noel Closson, Stanley Jordan	5:56
3.	"When Julia Smiles"	Larry Graham, Stanley Jordan	5:53
4.	"Can't Sit Down"	Philip Bailey, Preston Glass, Stanley Jordan, Maurice White	5:35
5.	"Stairway to Heaven"	Jimmy Page, Robert Plant	6:16
6.	"Brooklyn at Midnight"	Steve Birch, Preston Glass, Stanley Jordan	5:01
7.	"The Music's Gonna Change"	Stanley Jordan	4:46
8.	"The Time Is Now"	Stanley Jordan	5:18
9.	"Flying Home"	Stanley Jordan	4:01
