= Sweet Connection =

German musical duo

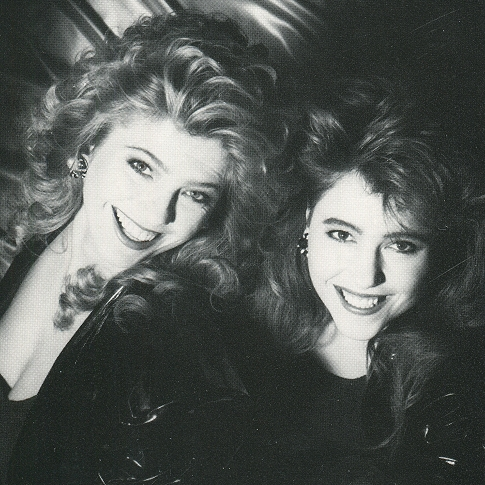
- Sweet Connection in 1988

Background information
- Origin: Germany
- Genres: Euro disco Synth-pop; Italo house Europop
- Years active: 1988–1990
- Labels: Blow Up (1988); Polydor (1989–1990)
- Past members: Original lineup: June LaVonne; Inge Schaubschläger; New lineup: Billie Joe; Sue Dixie

Sweet Connection was a female musical duo project from Germany. Active for a short period between 1988 and 1990, they were notable for their debut song "Need Your Passion".

== History ==
=== Original lineup ===
Behind the project was euro disco record producer Luis Rodriguez, better known for his work with Modern Talking and C. C. Catch, with songwriter-producer Reinhardt Frantz (New Baccara, Casablanca, Pepper Girls). The group's image revolved around the sexy dichotomy of a sultry blonde and brunette.

The duo originally consisted of brunette June LaVonne Polichio (born December 27, 1959, Los Angeles, United States) (former lead singer of 'The Pinups', a German-based Californian group) and blonde Inge Schaubschläger (born December 20, 1966, Wolfratshausen, Germany), a glamour model. The duo released their debut single "Need Your Passion" in 1988, which became a European club hit, Hit Nr.1 in Japan.

At the end of the year followed their second single "Dirty Job".

=== New lineup ===
In 1989 the duo was replaced with two new singers with aliases Billie Joe aka Billie aka Billie Kaman (real name) and Sue Dixie (real name). Unlike the early incarnation, both artists were co-writing the songs. The duo released two highly successful singles for the following two years ("Heart To Heart" and "Love Bites") before dissolving in breaking up in 1991.

=== Present ===
Although an album was never leased during their active career, in 2008, a compilation album titled after their hit debut song, Need Your Passion, was released by an independent record label DWS Records. It featured most of Sweet Connection's singles and remixes.

The brunette of the first lineup, June LaVonne, resided in Germany and continued her career in music under the alias of Bonnie Benedict. She also ran a private English teaching course in Hamburg.

June LaVonne passed away in August of 2025, which was confirmed on her official website.

== Discography ==
=== Singles ===
- 1988 – "Need Your Passion"
- 1988 – "Dirty Job"
- 1989 – "Heart To Heart"
- 1990 – "Love Bites"

=== Albums ===
- 2008 – Need Your Passion (compilation album)
