= Faces (Nik Kershaw song) =

Song by Nik Kershaw

from the album Human Racing
- Released: 1984
- Recorded: 1983
- Genre: Pop rock
- Length: 4:05
- Label: MCA
- Songwriter: Nik Kershaw
- Producer: Peter Collins

Official audio
- "Faces" on YouTube

"Faces" is a song by the English singer-songwriter Nik Kershaw. It appears as the eighth track on Kershaw's highly successful debut studio album Human Racing, released in 1984.

Lyrically, the song seems to be about drugs or even religion. When Kershaw was asked about the meaning of the song, he said:

"I can't remember... but seriously, it's very difficult going back on old songs and trying to remember what you were thinking about when you wrote them... but I seem to remember [that] it was about religion and the hypocrisy of some organised religions."
