= Evolution (Scotch album) =

Studio album by Scotch
- Released: 1985
- Genre: Italo disco
- Length: 37:44
- Label: Many Records
- Producer: David Zambelli; Walter Verdi

Scotch chronology
Evolution (1985)	Pictures of Old Days (1987)

Singles from Evolution
- 1. "Disco Band" Released: 1984; 2. "Delirio Mind" Released: 1984; 3. "Take Me Up" Released: 1985

Evolution is the debut studio album by the Italian Italo disco band Scotch. It was released in 1985.

== Track listing ==
Side one
No.	Title	Writer(s)	Length
1.	"Primitive Man"	Vincenzo Lancini; Fabio Margutti	4:18
2.	"Take Me Up"	Lancini; Margutti	4:00
3.	"Man in the Man"	Lancini; Margutti	4:08
4.	"Born to Kill"	Lancini; Margutti	5:48
Total length:			18:14

Side two
No.	Title	Writer(s)	Length
1.	"Komburn"	Lancini; Margutti	1:04
2.	"Delirio Mind"	Lancini; Margutti	5:10
3.	"Loving is Easy / Evolution"	Lancini; Margutti; John Lees	4:45
4.	"Disco Band"	Margutti	4:06
5.	"Losing in Time"	Lancini; Margutti	4:25
Total length:			19:30

== Charts ==
Chart (1985)	Peak position
German Albums (Offizielle Top 100)	63
Swedish Albums (Sverigetopplistan)	4
Swiss Albums (Schweizer Hitparade)	22
