= Topo & Roby =

- Origin: Milan
- Genres: Italo disco
- Years active: 1980s

Topo & Roby was a 1980s Italian Italo disco duo consisting of Roby, the stage name of American-Italian vocalist Simona Zanini, and Topo, a robot. Zanini sang all vocal parts, including the automated voice of Topo, and the music was written, performed and produced by keyboardist Aldo Martinelli and producer Fabrizio Gatto.

Topo & Roby are mostly remembered, apart from their unusual line-up, for the song "Under the Ice" (1984), which received significant airplay in European disco clubs and radio stations and reached number 20 in France.

== Discography ==
=== Singles ===
Year	Title	Charts
Year	Title	FR
1984	"Under the Ice"	20
1988	"Set on Fire"	—

== See also ==
- Martinelli (band)
- Radiorama
- Raggio Di Luna (Moon Ray)
