= Delirio Mind =

1984 single by Scotch

- Artwork for the German vinyl single release

Single by Scotch

from the album Evolution
- B-side: "Man in the Man"
- Released: 1984
- Recorded: 1983
- Genre: Italo disco
- Length: 3:35
- Label: American Disco; ZYX
- Songwriter(s): Vincenzo Lancini; Fabio Margutti
- Producer(s): David Zambelli; Walter Verdi

Scotch singles chronology
| "Disco Band" (1984) | "Delirio Mind" (1984) | "Take Me Up" (1985) |

Audio
- "Delirio Mind" on YouTube

"Delirio Mind" is a song by the Italian Italo disco band Scotch, written by singers Vince Lancini and Fabio Margutti.

== Background ==
"Delirio Mind" was written by Vince Lancini and Fabio Margutti.

== Track listing ==
- Italian 12-inch single

A. "Delirio Mind" – 5:37
B. "Man in the Man" – 3:30

- German 7-inch single

A. "Delirio Mind" (First Version) – 3:35
B. "Man in the Man" – 3:28

- German 12-inch single

A. "Delirio Mind" – 4:35
B. "Man in the Man" – 3:28

== Personnel ==
Scotch

- Vince Lancini – lead and harmony vocals
- Fabio Margutti – keyboards

== Charts ==
=== Weekly charts ===
Weekly chart performance for "Delirio Mind"
| Chart (1985) | Peak position |
|---|---|
| Austria (Ö3 Austria Top 40) | 18 |
| Sweden (Sverigetopplistan) | 5 |
| Switzerland (Schweizer Hitparade) | 19 |
| West Germany (GfK) | 6 |

=== Year-end charts ===
Year-end chart performance for "Delirio Mind"
| Chart (1985) | Position |
|---|---|
| West Germany (Official German Charts) | 52 |
