= Novecento (group) =

Italian music band

- Origin: Italy
- Genres: Italo disco; synthpop; soft rock; pop rock; jazz; funk; house
- Years active: 1984–1997; 2002–present
- Members: Dora Nicolosi; Lino Nicolosi; Pino Nicolosi; Rossana Nicolosi

Novecento is an Italian band founded by Pino Nicolosi, Lino Nicolosi, Rossana Nicolosi, and Dora Nicolosi (née Carofiglio) in 1984. Their music has gone through a variety of genres, such as Italo disco (early work), synthpop, soft rock, pop rock, jazz, and funk. The band was active in the 1980s and the 1990s and became popular with the debut single, "Movin' On", which sold more than 100,000 copies in 1984. The band went on to win the "Revelation of the Year" award during the national television event Azzurro 1984. They were signed to Italian Five Records and Baby Records, with international distribution via WEA, Warner Music, and ZTT.

In 1990 they scored another hit with the eurodance song "I Need Love". After recording seven albums, Novecento disbanded in 1997. They briefly reunited in 2002 and again in 2008, when they scored significant success with the single "Cry".

== Members ==
- Dora Nicolosi – vocals
- Lino Nicolosi – guitar
- Pino Nicolosi – keyboards
- Rossana Nicolosi – bass

== Discography ==
=== Albums ===
- 1984: Novecento (WEA Italiana)
- 1986: Dreamland (Art Records)
- 1989: Shine (Five Records)
- 1991: Leaving Now (Discomagic)
- 1992: Necessary (Baby)
- 1997: C'è un mondo che (Crisler Music)
- 2002: Featuring
- 2004: Dream of Peace, with Stanley Jordan
- 2005: Together as One, with Gregg Kofi Brown
- 2008: Secret
- 2009: Drum 'n' Voice vol. 3 with Billy Cobham
- 2009: Surrender, with Dominic Miller
- 2011: Drum 'n' voice 1-2-3, with Billy Cobham
- 2013: Sentieri notturni radio capítal, Novecento and friends
- 2013: Through the Years

Compilation albums

- 1990: The Best
- 1993: Collection
- 2003: Greatest Hits: The History

=== Singles ===
- 1984: "Movin' On"/"Splendid Moment Together" (WEA Italiana)
- 1984: "The Only One"/"Take a Chance" (WEA Italiana)
- 1985: "Why Me"/"Someday" (WEA Italiana)
- 1986: "Excessive Love"/"Single Reason" (Art)
- 1986: "Dreamland Paradise"/"Near Me" (Art)
- 1987: "Changes"/"Changes" (dub version) (CGD)
- 1988: "Broadway"/"Mama Say Ye" (Five Record) (12")
- 1989: "Darei"/"Tabù" (Five Record)
- 1990: "I Need Love"/"I Need Love" (remix) (Hundred) (12")
- 1991: "Heart on the Line"/"In the Rain" (Discomagic) (12")
- 1992: "Day and Night" (Baby) (12")
- 1993: "Marimba Day (Everybody Dancing)" (Baby) (12")
- 1998: "Sogni che rimangono"
- 2008: "Cry"
- 2008: "Stop the Time"
