= Memory Records =

Defunct Italian record label

- Parent company: Renata Edizioni Musicali
- Founded: 1983
- Founder: Alessandro Zanni; Stefano Cundari
- Defunct: 1989
- Distributor: Self-distributed
- Genre: Italo disco
- Country of origin: Italy

Memory Records was an Italian record label in Italy.

== History ==
It was founded in 1983 by Alessandro Zanni (executive producer) and Stefano Cundari (art producer). Since the very beginning, Memory Records took special care for the instrumental synthesizer productions, launching artists such as Hipnosis, Koto and Cyber People. Besides these, the main label artists were J. D. Jaber, Mike Cannon, Duke Lake, Baby's Gang, Ken Laszlo, Alan Ross, Brian Ice, Roy, and Swan.

Aside from having a main studio in Italy, Memory Records had branches in Spain and Germany. Digital Records was a sub-label of Memory from 1985 until 1988. It was formerly branded as Plexi-Glass Productions for a short time from 1985 to 1986.

== Partnership with ZYX Records ==
ZYX Records became a partner since the first releases, licensing almost the entire catalogue for the German market. By 1984, the company of Bernhard Mikulski even started to use the Memory Records logos and similar catalogue matrix.

== Popularity loss and closure ==
After 4 years, the beginning of the end arrived in 1987, when Italo disco was fading out in Europe and its business suffered drastic decline due to the increasingly strong popularity of house music. The label, like many others, then tried to survive changing its style towards house and Eurobeat with discrete results.

In 1989, Memory closed shop in 1989. Zanni and Cundari went on to form MCE Records to produce techno house music, but ceased its operations after Cundari's death in 1993. Its back catalogs are currently owned by ZYX Music.

== Songs ==
Year	Artist	Song	Catalog Number
1983	Kirlian Camera	"Communicate"	MEMIX 001
1983	Hipnosis	"Pulstar"	MEMIX 002
1983	Cheaps	"Moliendo Café"	MEMIX 003
1983	Sky Creackers	"You Should Be Dancing"	MEMIX 004
1983	J.D. Jaber	"Don't Stop Lovin'"	MEMIX 005
1983	Faxe	"Time For Changes"	MEMIX 006
1983	Mike Cannon	"Voices In The Dark"	MEMIX 007
1983	Koto	"Japanese War Game"	MEMIX 008
1983	Duke Lake	"Do You"	MEMIX 009
1983	Hipnosis	"Oxigene"	MEMIX 010
1983	Baby's Gang	"Happy Song"	MEMIX 011
1983	Brando	"Rainy Day"	MEMIX 012
1983	Diego	"Walk In The Night"	MEMIX 013
1984	Phil Grant	"Hey Girl"	MEMIX 014
1984	Cyber People	"Polaris"	MEMIX 015
1984	Ken Laszlo	"Hey Hey Guy"	MEMIX 016
1984	Mike Cannon	"Stay"	MEMIX 017
1984	Mirage	"Change Your Life"	MEMIX 018
1984	The Kitch Club	"Can't Stop Saying I Love You"	MEMIX 019
1984	Duke Lake	"Satisfaction, Love & Passion"	MEMIX 022
1984	Hipnosis	"Astrodance" / "Argonauts"	MEMIX 023
1984	G.J. Lunghi	"Acapulco Nights"	MEMIX 024
1984	Image	"Hot Stuff"	MEMIX 025
1984	Live Movies	"Love Me Now (Please Love Me Do)"	MEMIX 026
1984	Baby's Gang	"Challenger"	MEMIX 027
1985	Cyber People	"Void Vision"	MEMIX 028
1985	Alan Ross	"Valentino Mon Amour"	MEMIX 029
1985	Koto	"Visitors"	MEMIX 030
1985	Duke Lake	"Dance Tonight"	MEMIX 031
1985	Brian Ice	"Talking To The Night"	MEMIX 032
1985	Assanti	"Ma Pecche'"	MEMIX 033
1985	Mike Cannon	"Goin' Crazy"	MEMIX 034
1985	Ken Laszlo	"Tonight"	MEMIX 035
1985	Roy	"Destiny Time"	MEMIX 036
1986	Ken Laszlo	"Tonight (Remix)"	MEMIX 038
1986	Cyber People	"Doctor Faustu's"	MEMIX 039
1986	Alan Ross	"The Last Wall"	MEMIX 040
1986	Brian Ice	"Tokyo"	MEMIX 041
1986	My Mine	"Can Delight"	MEMIX 042
1986	Risen From The Rank	"I.N.R.I. (Risen In My Mind)"	MEMIX 043
1986	Atrium	"Doctor Jekyll"	MEMIX 044
1986	Ken Laszlo	"Don't Cry"	MEMIX 045
1986	J.D. Jaber	"Don't Wake Me Up"	MEMIX 046
1986	Koto	"Jabdah"	MEMIX 047
1986	Tom Hooker	"Looking For Love"	MEMIX 048
1986	Paul Lekakis	"Boom Boom (Let's Go Back To My Room)"	MEMIX 049
1986	Flo Astaire	"Monkey Monkey"	MEMIX 050
1986	Solo	"Harem"	MEMIX 051
1986	Swan	"General Custer"	MEMIX 052
1986	Koto	"Jabdah (Remix)"	MEMIX 053
1987	Lee Young	"Napoleon (Napolion)"	MEMIX 054
1987	Joe Lettieri	"You'll Be Mine"	MEMIX 055
1987	Brian Ice	"Night Girl"	MEMIX 056
1987	Laurie	"Wheel Of Love"	MEMIX 057
1987	Yeti	"Neanderthal Man"	MEMIX 058
1987	Ken Laszlo	"1.2.3.4.5.6.7.8"	MEMIX 061
1987	Roy	"Shooting Star"	MEMIX 062
1987	Ken Laszlo	"Glasses Man"	MEMIX 063
1987	Apple in Jacket	"New World"	MEMIX 064
1987	50 & 50 Brothers	"Red Man"	MEMIX 065
1987	DJ Lelewel	"House Machine"	MEMIX 066
1987	Hipnosis	"Droid" / "Automatic Piano"	MEMIX 067
1988	Swan	"Keep Me Satisfied"	MEMIX 068
1988	Argentina	"Let's Play Sexy Games"	MEMIX 069
1988	Cyber People	"Digital Signal Processor"	MEMIX 070
1988	Robert Tomasi	"When I Let You Down"	MEMIX 071
1988	Max 'n Sandy	"Keep The Joint" / "Nowar"	MEMIX 072
1988	Ken Laszlo	"Red Man" / "Black Pearl"	MEMIX 073
1988	Koto	"Dragon's Legend"	MEMIX 074
1988	Denise and Baby's Gang	"Disco Maniac"	MEMIX 075
1988	Dale	"Do You Like House?"	MEMIX 076
1988	Argentina	"Let's All Dance"	MEMIX 077
1988	Amadhouse	"Shock Me Amadhouse"	MEMIX 078
1988	Tony Turn	"Cherry Chery"	MEMIX 079
1988	Brian Ice	"Over Again"	MEMIX 080
1988	Tina Gabriel	"If You Say You Love Me"	MEMIX 081
1989	Koto	"Chinese Revenge (Asia Version '89)"	MEMIX 082
1989	Ken Laszlo	"Everybody's Is Dancing"	MEMIX 083
1989	Gino Caria	"Entriamo?"	MEMIX 084
1989	50 & 50 Brothers	"Do The Crocodile"	MEMIX 085
1989	Helen	"I Love You"	MEMIX 086
1989	Ken Laszlo	"Madame" / "Let Me Try"	MEMIX 087
1989	Daniel Danieli	"Hold Your Horses" / "The Race"	MEMIX 088
1989	Argentina	"Summer Time"	MEMIX 089
1989	Angel	"Angel"	MEMIX 090
1989	Brian Ice	"Walkin' Away"	MEMIX 091
1989	Miss Sage	"Infatuation"	MEMIX 092
1989	Alan Ross	"Ciao"	MEMIX 093
1989	Shado	"Tonight My Love Is Alive"	MEMIX 094

== Albums ==
Year	Artist	Album	Catalog Number
1985	Baby's Gang	"Challenger"	MELP 002
1985	Varese	"Varese"	MELP 003
1986	Mike Platinas & Javier Ussia	"Mas Mix Que Nunca!!!"	MELP 004
1987	Ken Laszlo	"Ken Laszlo"	MELP 005
1988	The Creatures	"Concerto No. 1"	MELP 006
