= People from Ibiza (song) =

1984 single by Sandy Marton

Single by Sandy Marton

from the album Modern Lover
- B-side: "People from Ibiza (Edit B)"
- Released: 1984
- Genre: Italo disco
- Length: 3:42
- Label: Mirto
- Songwriters: Sandy Marton; Claudio Cecchetto
- Producer: Claudio Cecchetto

Sandy Marton singles chronology
"Ok. Run" (1983)	"People from Ibiza" (1984)	"Camel by Camel" (1985)

"People from Ibiza" is a 1984 song by Croatian singer-songwriter Sandy Marton from his debut studio album, Modern Lover (1986).

== Track listing and formats ==
- Italian 7-inch single

A. "People from Ibiza" (edit A) – 3:42
B. "People from Ibiza" (edit B) – 4:10

- Italian 12-inch single

A. "People from Ibiza" – 8:20
B1. "People from Ibiza" (instrumental) – 6:00
B2. "People from Ibiza" (another version of) – 3:00

== Credits and personnel ==
- Sandy Marton – songwriter, vocals
- Claudio Cecchetto – songwriter, producer
- Mario Flores – engineering
- Daniele Delfitto – mastering
- Jay Burnett – mixing
- Nino Lelli – arranger
- Pippo Ingrosso – cover art, photographer
- Maurizio Marani – cover art designer

Credits and personnel adapted from the Modern Lover album and 7-inch single liner notes.

== Charts ==
Weekly chart performance for "People from Ibiza"
Chart (1984)	Peak position
Austria (Ö3 Austria Top 40)	14
Belgium (Ultratop 50 Flanders)	39
Finland (Suomen virallinen lista)	15
Italy (Musica e dischi)	1
Netherlands (Dutch Top 40)	38
Netherlands (Single Top 100)	45
Norway (VG-lista)	4
Switzerland (Schweizer Hitparade)	7
West Germany (GfK)	10

== Certifications and sales ==
Certifications and sales for "People from Ibiza"
Region	Certification	Certified units/sales
Spain (PROMUSICAE)	Gold	25,000^{^}
^{^} Shipments figures based on certification alone.

== See also ==
- List of number-one hits of 1984 (Italy)
