= The Twins (German duo) =

German synthpop duo

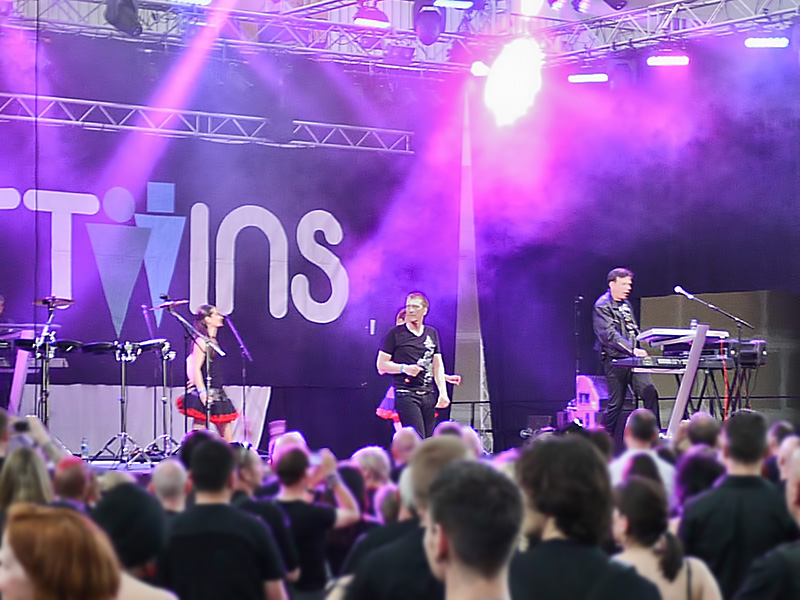
- The Twins performing in 2011

Background information
- Origin: Berlin, Germany
- Genres: Synth-pop; Eurodisco; new wave
- Years active: 1980–present
- Labels: Hansa; Columbia
- Members: Ronny Schreinzer; Sven Dohrow
- Website: the-twins.de

The Twins are a German synth-pop duo formed in Berlin in 1980. Their most successful singles include "Face to Face – Heart to Heart", "Not the Loving Kind", "Ballet Dancer" and "Love System."

The duo's influences include Gary Numan, OMD, Ultravox and early Depeche Mode.

== Discography ==
=== Albums ===
Year	Album	Peak positions		
Year	Album	GER	SWE	SWI
1981	Passion Factory	—	—	—
1982	Modern Lifestyle	—	—	—
1983	A Wild Romance	30	47	14
1985	Until the End of Time	—	—	—
1987	Hold On to Your Dreams	—	—	—
1991	Classics • Remixed (compilation)	—	—	—
1993	The Impossible Dream	—	—	—
1994	12" Classics (compilation)	—	—	—
1998	Ballet Dancer (compilation)	—	—	—
2005	Live in Sweden	—	—	—
2008	Singles Collection (compilation)	—	—	—
2015	The Original Maxi-Singles Collection (compilation)	—	—	—
2018	Living for the Future	—	—	—
"—" denotes releases that did not chart or were not released.

=== Singles ===
Year	Single	Peak positions				Album
Year	Single	GER	AUS	ITA	SWI	Album
1981	"Runaway"	—	—	—	—	Passion Factory
1981	"The Desert Place"	—	—	—	—	Passion Factory
1982	"Birds and Dogs"	—	—	—	—	Modern Lifestyle
1982	"Face to Face – Heart to Heart"	—	—	5	—	Modern Lifestyle
1983	"Not the Loving Kind"	—	24	9	—	A Wild Romance
1984	"Ballet Dancer"	19	84	3	10	A Wild Romance
1984	"Between The Woman and You"	—	—	—	—	A Wild Romance
1984	"Love System"	27	—	—	—	A Wild Romance
1985	"Love in the Dark"	55	—	—	—	Until the End of Time
1985	"Deep Within My Heart"	—	—	—	—	Until the End of Time
1986	"I Need You"	—	—	—	—	Until the End of Time
1987	"Time Will Tell"	—	—	—	—	Hold on to Your Dreams
1987	"Hold on to Your Dreams"	—	—	—	—	Hold on to Your Dreams
1988	"One Day"	—	—	—	—	Hold on to Your Dreams
1991	"Not the Loving Kind (remix)"	—	—	—	—	Classics • Remixed
1991	"Ballet Dancer (remix)"	—	—	—	—	Classics • Remixed
1993	"Tonight"	80	—	—	—	The Impossible Dream
1993	"Love Is Blind"	—	—	—	—	The Impossible Dream
2002	"Face to Face (re-recorded)"	—	—	—	—	non-album singles
2006	"Ballet Dancer (Latino-Mix)"	—	—	—	—	non-album singles
"—" denotes releases that did not chart or were not released.

=== DVDs ===
- 2005 – Live in Sweden
- 2009 – Video Classics and Rare Clips
