= Mirage (Scotch song) =

1986 single by Scotch

Single by Scotch

from the album Pictures of Old Days
- B-side: "Amor Por Victoria"
- Released: 1986
- Genre: Italo disco
- Length: 3:55
- Label: Many Records; ZYX
- Songwriter(s): Vincenzo Lancini; Fabio Margutti; David Zambelli
- Producer(s): David Zambelli; Walter Zambelli; Walter Verdi

Scotch singles chronology
"Take Me Up" (1985)	"Mirage" (1986)	"Money Runner" (1986)

Audio
- "Mirage" on YouTube

"Mirage" is a song by the Italian Italo disco band Scotch.

== Background ==
"Mirage" was co-written by singers Vince Lancini and Fabio Margutti and producer David Zambelli.

== Track listing ==
- Italian 7-inch single

A. "Mirage" – 3:55
B. "Amor Por Victoria" – 4:30

- German 12-inch maxi single

A. "Mirage" – 5:02
B1. "Amor Por Victoria" – 4:49
B2. "Mirage" (German Version) – 4:57

== Personnel ==
Scotch

- Vince Lancini – lead and harmony vocals
- Fabio Margutti – keyboards

== Charts ==
=== Weekly charts ===
Weekly chart performance for "Mirage"
Chart (1986)	Peak position
Italy (Musica e dischi)	25
Sweden (Sverigetopplistan)	2
West Germany (GfK)	56

== Finzy Kontini cover ==
"Mirage"

Single by Finzy Kontini

from the album Cha Cha Cha
- Released: 1987
- Genre: Italo disco
- Length: 4:42
- Label: Many Records; King Records
- Songwriter(s): Vincenzo Lancini; Fabio Margutti; David Zambelli
- Producer(s): Bruno Rosellini; Fabrizio Baldoni; Zambelli Brothers

Finzy Kontini singles chronology
"Cha Cha Cha" (1986)	"Mirage" (1987)	"Mambo" (1987)

Audio
- "Mirage" on YouTube

A cover by Italo disco group, Finzy Kontini, was released in 1987 as a single. It is the eighth and final track from their 1987 album, Cha Cha Cha.
