= Take Me Up =

Single by Scotch

from the album Evolution
- Released: 1985
- Genre: Italo disco
- Label: American Disco; ZYX
- Songwriter(s): Vince Lancini; Fabio Margutti

Scotch singles chronology
"Delirio Mind" (1985)	"Take Me Up" (1985)	"Mirage" (1986)

Music video
- "Take Me Up" on YouTube

"Take Me Up" is a song by the Italian Italo disco band Scotch, written by singers Vince Lancini and Fabio Margutti.

== Composition ==
The song was written by Vince Lancini and Fabio Margutti and produced by Walter Verdi, David Zambelli and Walter Zambelli.

== Charts ==
Chart (1985)	Peak position
France (SNEP)	10
Germany (GfK)	19
