= Baby's Gang =

Italian musical group

- Origin: Italy
- Genres: Italo disco; synth-pop
- Years active: 1983–1989
- Labels: Memory; Durium; ZYX; Peerless
- Past members: Caterina; Cristina; Debora; Denise; Federica; Ilaria; Laura B.; Laura M.; Lisa; Maria Grazia; Mary; Patrizia; Sara; Vittoriana

Baby's Gang were an Italian teen pop band formed in Italy in 1983. The group comprised thirteen teenagers fronted by future italo disco star Ivana Spagna. They are mostly known for their hit single "Happy Song".

== History ==
Baby's Gang was formed in 1983 by producer Alfredo Pignagnoli and consisted of thirteen teenagers led by vocalist Ivana Spagna. Pignagnoli, Spagna and Otto Bacciocci were responsible for writing the majority of Baby Gang's material. The signature sound of the band was a dance beat that crossed over between Italo-Disco and Electro-Pop.

Baby's Gang were signed by Memory Records, spearheaded by producer Alessandro Zanni, and released a handful of successful singles, including their major hit "Happy Song". In 1985 German disco band Boney M recorded a cover version that made the song into a European hit.

Following the release of their first album, Challenger (1985), Spagna went on to have a solo career with the song "Easy Lady". Baby's Gang disbanded at the end of 1988. Of the group, Denise Bonfanti subsequently enjoyed a mildly successful career as vocalist.

== Discography ==
=== Albums ===
- Challenger (1985)
- Child Disco (1989)

=== Singles ===
- 1983: "Happy Song"
- 1984: "Challenger"
- 1985: "America"
- 1985: "Jamin"
- 1985: "Step by Step"
- 1986: "My Little Japanese Boy"
- 1988: "Disco Maniac"
