= Nicolosi Productions =

- Founded: 1997
- Founder: Pino Nicolosi, Lino Nicolosi
- Genre: Various
- Country of origin: Italy
- Location: Milan
- Official website: www.nicolosiproductions.it

Nicolosi Productions is an Italian record label founded by brothers Pino Nicolosi and Lino Nicolosi.

They produce various genres including jazz, soul, funk, and Italian pop music. Artists produced include Al Jarreau, Billy Cobham, Billy Preston, Chaka Khan, Dominic Miller, Eumir Deodato, Stanley Jordan, and Sting.

Pino and Lino Nicolosi were part of the Italian band Novecento, with Rossana Nicolosi and Dora Nicolosi.

== Discography ==
=== Albums ===
- 1997: Billy Preston – You and I
- 2001: Billy Cobham – Drum 'n' Voice (Just Groove/Nicolosi)
- 2002: Novecento – Featuring...
- 2004: Danny Gottlieb – Back to the Past (Jazz/Nicolosi)
- 2004: Novecento feat. Stanley Jordan – Dreams of Peace
- 2006: Billy Cobham –Drum 'n' Voice Vol. 2 (Just Groove/Nicolosi)
- 2007: Randy Crawford – Live in Zagreb (Just Groove/Nicolosi)
- 2008: Novecento – Secret (joint Just Music/Nicolosi)
- 2009: Billy Cobham – Drum 'n' Voice Vol. 3 (Soul Trade/Nicolosi)
- 2009: Novecento feat. Dominic Miller – Surrender (Just Groove/Jusi Music /Soul Trade)
- 2010: Eumir Deodato – The Crossing (Nicolosi/Soul Trade)
- 2011: Billy Cobham – Drum 'n' Voice vols. 1-2-3 (3-CD Collection)
- 2013: Dennis Chambers -Groove and More
- 2016: Billy Cobham – Drum 'n' Voice vol. 4
- 2022: Billy Cobham – Drum 'n' Voice vol. 5

=== Songs ===
- 2005: Sting – "Lullaby to an Anxious Child"
- 2010: Chaka Khan – "Alive" (Nicolosi/Soul Trade)
- 2010: Al Jarreau – "Double Face"
- 2012: Patti Austin – "Practice What You Preaching"
