= Comanchero (song) =

Single by Raggio Di Luna
- B-side: "Comanchero (Instrumental)"
- Released: 1984
- Genre: Italo disco
- Length: 3:58
- Label: Discotto; Ariola
- Songwriter(s): Aldo Martinelli, Simona Zanini
- Producer(s): Aldo Martinelli, Fabrizio Gatto

"Comanchero" is a song by Raggio Di Luna (Moon Ray). It was written by Italian record producer Aldo Martinelli and Simona Zanini and released as a single in 1984 on Discotto S.A.S. It became a hit single in several European countries, reaching number 2 in Austria, number 3 in West Germany, number 4 in Switzerland, number 5 in France and number 17 in Italy.

== Track listings ==
7" single (Ariola 107 053)

1. "Comanchero" (Vocal) – 3:58
2. "Comanchero" (Instrumental) – 4:04

12" maxi (Ariola 601 573 / Il Discotto 1043)

1. "Comanchero" (Vocal) – 7:38
2. "Comanchero" (Instrumental) – 6:28

12" maxi (Ariola 601 679)

1. "Comanchero" (Special Disco Remix) – 8:35
2. "Comanchero" (Instrumental) – 6:24

== Charts ==
=== Weekly charts ===
Weekly chart performance for "Comanchero"
Chart (1984–1985)	Peak position
Austria (Ö3 Austria Top 40)	2
Europe (European Top 100 Singles)	48
France (SNEP)	5
Italy (Musica e dischi)	22
Switzerland (Schweizer Hitparade)	4
West Germany (GfK)	3

=== Year-end charts ===
Year-end chart performance for "Comanchero"
Chart (1985)	Position
Austria (Ö3 Austria Top 40)	12
France (IFOP)	17
Switzerland (Schweizer Hitparade)	28
West Germany (Official German Charts)	22

== Other versions ==
In 1997, the song was covered and released as a single by Robin Cook, whose version reached No. 5 in Sweden.
