= Money Runner =

1986 single by Scotch

Single by Scotch

from the album Pictures of Old Days
- B-side: "Drink a Scotch"
- Released: 1986
- Genre: Italo disco
- Length: 6:19 (album version); 4:02 (single version)
- Label: Many
- Songwriters: Fabio Margutti; Walter Zambelli; Naimy Hackett
- Producers: David Zambelli; Walter Zambelli

Scotch singles chronology
"Mirage" (1986)	"Money Runner" (1986)	"Pictures" (1987)

Audio
- "Money Runner" on YouTube

"Money Runner" is a song by Italian Italo disco band Scotch, released in 1986 as the second single from their second studio album, Pictures of Old Days (1987).

== Reception ==
Italian writer Rocco Bargioni described the song as having 'aged very well, perhaps due to its more decisive and mature style compared to other Scotch hits', and noted how it's a rare example of Italo disco song where 'there is an attempt to tell a story'.

== Track listing and formats ==
- Italian 7-inch single

A. "Money Runner" (Vocal) – 4:02
B. "Drink a Scotch" – 4:10

- Italian 12-inch single

A. "Money Runner" (Vocal) – 4:02
B. "Drink a Scotch" – 4:10

- German 12-inch maxi-single

A. "Money Runner" – 6:19
B. "Drink a Scotch" – 6:16

== Charts ==
Weekly chart performance for "Money Runner"
Chart (1987)	Peak position
Norway (VG-lista)	10
Sweden (Sverigetopplistan)	12
