= A Wild Romance =

Studio album by the Twins
- Released: 1983; 1984 (IT)
- Studios: Studio Funk and Recordland
- Genres: Pop; synth-pop
- Length: 46:05
- Label: Hansa International
- Producers: Ronny Schreinzer; Sven Dohrow

The Twins chronology
Modern Lifestyle (1982)	A Wild Romance (1983)	Until the End of Time (1985)

Singles from A Wild Romance
- 1. "Ballet Dancer" Released: 1983; 2. "Not the Loving Kind" Released: 1983; 3. "A Wild Romance" Released: 1983 (Philippines only); 4. "Love System" Released: 1984; 5. "Between the Woman and You" Released: 1984

A Wild Romance is the third studio album by the German synth-pop band the Twins, released in 1983 by Hansa International. The album peaked at No. 30 on the German album charts, and contained the band's two top 30 German hits, "Ballet Dancer" (No. 19) and "Love System" (No. 27).

== Track listing ==
All tracks written by Ronny Schreinzer and Sven Dohrow, except where noted.

Side one

1. "Love System" (Michael Gerlach, Sven Dohrow) – 4:20
2. "Ballet Dancer" – 3:25
3. "A Wild Romance" – 4:42
4. "Private Eye" – 4:44
5. "Facts of Love" – 3:37
6. "Criminal Love" (Dohrow) – 3:50

Side two

1. "Not the Loving Kind" – 3:57
2. "Must Have Her Back" – 3:37
3. "Why Don't You" – 3:59
4. "Men of Destiny" – 3:49
5. "Between the Woman and You" – 6:05

On later CD issues, the 1984 single "The Game of Chance" B-side "A Little More Alive" is included.
