= Scotch (band) =

Italian Italo disco band (1982–1987)

- Origin: Bergamo, Italy
- Genres: Italo disco; synth-pop
- Years active: 1982–1987
- Labels: Il Discotto; Many Records; American Disco; ZYX
- Spinoffs: Bosa Trida
- Past members: Vince Lancini; Fabio Margutti; Franz Rome; Franz Felleti; Manlio Cangelli

Scotch were an Italian Italo disco band, formed in Bergamo in 1982, that comprised Vince Lancini, Fabio Margutti, Franz Rome, Franz Felleti and Manlio Cangelli.

== History ==
Scotch was created by David Zambelli and Walter Verdi, both record producers from Bergamo. The group's first success was "Penguins' Invasion", written by Manlio Cangelli. "Penguins' Invasion" was an instrumental piece. About three months after its release, it was decided to create a vocal version and Vince Lancini was chosen as singer. Later he joined the group with Fabio Margutti.

Among their most known tracks are "Take Me Up", "Disco Band", "Mirage", "Delirio Mind", "Penguins' Invasion", "Evolution", "Plus Plus", "Money Runner", "Pictures" and "Man to Man".

The band had numerous hits, including the 1984 single "Disco Band" which was a major hit in Germany and other countries. That same year, they released their first album, Evolution.

"Delirio Mind" was the next single which was a huge hit in Sweden. Other songs were "Plus Plus" and "Money Runner".

"Disco Band" was sampled on Scooter's 2007 hit single "Lass uns tanzen", and "Penguins' Invasion" continues to be popular, appearing on various Italo disco compilations and retrospectives.

== Discography ==
- Evolution (1985)
- Pictures of Old Days (1987)

=== Singles ===
- 1983: "Penguins' Invasion" (vocal, 12")
- 1984: "Disco Band" – #28 Italy, #3 Germany, #20 Sweden, #4 Switzerland, #1 Austria, #4 Portugal
- 1984: "Delirio Mind" – #6 Germany, #5 Sweden, #19 Switzerland
- 1985: "Take Me Up" – #19 Germany, #11 Portugal
- 1986: "Mirage" – #19 Italy, #56 Germany, #2 Sweden
- 1986: "Money Runner" – #12 Sweden
- 1986: "Pictures" – #16 Sweden
- 1987: "Man to Man"

Charting Top-10 singles
Title	Album	Country	Peak position	Weeks on chart	Reference(s)
"Mirage"	Best of Scotch	Sweden	2	5	
"Disco Band"	Evolution	Switzerland	4	15	
"Delirio Mind"	Best of Scotch	Sweden	5	5	
"Take Me Up"	Evolution	France	10	19	
"Money Runner"	Best of Scotch	Norway	10	1	

Charting Top-10 Albums
Album	Country	Peak position	Weeks on chart	Reference(s)
Evolution	Sweden	4	17	
