= Sandy Marton =

Croatian singer, songwriter and musician (born 1959)

- Also known as: M. Basic
- Born: Aleksandar Marton; 4 October 1959 (age 66); Zagreb, PR Croatia, FPR Yugoslavia
- Genres: Italo disco; synth-pop
- Occupations: Singer; songwriter; musician
- Instruments: Vocals; keytar
- Years active: 1983–1994
- Labels: CBS; Ibiza Records

Aleksandar "Sandy" Marton (born 4 October 1959) is an Italy-based Croatian singer, songwriter and musician. His most famous songs include "People from Ibiza", "Exotic and Erotic", and "Camel by Camel".

== Biography ==
=== Early life ===
Sandy Marton was born Aleksandar Marton in Zagreb (then Yugoslavia) on 4 October 1959. His father worked for the Yugoslav embassy in Italy, which led Marton to spend increased amounts of time there. He moved to the Italian city of Milan in the 1970s.

=== 1980s: debut and success ===
In 1982, Marton was noticed by talent scout Claudio Cecchetto performing at the Primadonna nightclub in Milan. Realizing his commercial potential as a teen idol, Cecchetto signed him on, and Marton made his debut the following year under the pseudonym M. Basic with a single titled "Ok Run". It would later garner attention from being used in commercials about the Philips Videopac. In 1984, with the definitive name Sandy Marton, Cecchetto officially launched him on the record market with the English-language dance single "People from Ibiza", composed by Marton himself. His carefully studied look, which included flowing blond hair with a keytar over his shoulder and extra-large jackets made him instantly recognizable, and Marton became an idol for young girls. The song gained traction on the Italian disco scene until it climbed the Italian charts until it reached the number-one position in October 1984, becoming his one and only number-one hit.

In 1985, he confirmed his popularity on the charts and in discos by releasing two more successful singles in the same genre: "Camel by Camel" and "Exotic & Erotic". "Exotic & Erotic" was released in Australia in 1986 and became a surprise Top 10 hit, despite receiving little airplay, due to the song's popularity in nightclubs and discos. Cecchetto's publicity stunts led to Marton becoming one of the most frequent guests of Vittorio Salvetti's Festivalbar, broadcast on television by Canale 5. The following year he released his first album, Modern Lover, featuring the title track, "Modern Lovers", which would become Marton's third top-ten hit in Italy. Given the success of the singer, Cecchetto founded the production house Marton Corporation and the record label Ibiza Records. However, starting in 1987, his mainstream popularity started declining although his singles still managed to chart high. In 1989 following the release of his final top-ten single "La Paloma Blanca", Marton largely retired from the music business owing to his status as an idol, along with management issues.

=== Later life ===
Having retired to private life on the island of Ibiza, to which he owes his popularity, he attempted an occasional return to the scene in 1996 with a second and final album, Erase una Vez, without obtaining much success. In 2001 he participated in the transmission La notte flies, a musical competition among the most famous songs of the 1980s, in which he presented "People From Ibiza" and reached the semifinals. In 2005 he participated in the third edition of the Rai 2 reality TV show L'Isola dei famosi, which started on 21 September, but retired on 17 October citing health problems. He was replaced by Maurizio Ferrini in subsequent editions of the program, though he would often be present in the studio as a commentator.

== Discography ==
=== Albums ===
- Modern Lover (1986)
- Erase Una Vez (1994)

=== Singles (as lead artist) ===
Year	Title	Peak chart positions			Album
Year	Title	ITA	SWI	GER	Album
1984	"People from Ibiza"	1	7	10	Modern Lover
1985	"Camel by Camel"	5	—	—	Non-album track
1985	"Exotic and Erotic"	15	—	41	Modern Lover
1985	"Merry Christmas and Happy New Year" b/w "Love Is Like a Game" (by Tracy Spencer)	44	—	—	Non-album tracks
1986	"Modern Lovers"	8	—	—	Modern Lover
1986	"White Storm in the Jungle"	—	29	—	Modern Lover
1987	"Love Synchronicity"	45	—	—	Non-album tracks
1989	"La Paloma Blanca"	9	—	—	Non-album tracks
1998	"Érase Una Vez" b/w "Once Upon a Time", "People from Ibiza"	—	—	—	Érase Una Vez
2006	"Caminando por la Calle"	—	—	—	Non-album tracks

=== Singles (as featured artist) ===
- Sound Of Ibiza (The Bootstraps, Feat. Sandy Marton) (2008)

== Sources ==
- Kent, David (1993). Australian Chart Book 1970–1992 (illustrated ed.). St Ives: N.S.W.: Australian Chart Book. p. 193. ISBN 0-646-11917-6.
