= Disco Band =

1984 single by Scotch

- Artwork for the German vinyl single release

Single by Scotch

from the album Evolution
- B-side: "Disco Band (Instrumental)"
- Released: 1985
- Recorded: 1983
- Genre: Italo disco
- Length: 4:00
- Label: American Disco; ZYX
- Songwriter: Fabio Margutti
- Producers: David Zambelli; Walter Verdi

Scotch singles chronology
"Penguins' Invasion" (1983)	"Disco Band" (1985)	"Delirio Mind" (1984)

Audio
- "Disco Band" on YouTube

"Disco Band" is a song by the Italian Italo disco band Scotch, released in 1985 as the lead single of their debut studio album Evolution. It was written by Fabio Margutti. It has a music video, which had been recorded in a medical center.

== Background ==
"Disco Band" was written by Fabio Margutti.

== Track listing ==
- Italian 7-inch single

A. "Disco Band" – 4:00
B. "Disco Band" (Instrumental) – 4:00

- Italian 12-inch single

A. "Disco Band" – 5:07
B. "Disco Band" (Instrumental) – 5:19

- German 12-inch maxi-single

A. "Disco Band" – 5:07
B. "Disco Band" (Instrumental) – 5:20

== Personnel ==
Scotch

- Vince Lancini – vocals
- Fabio Margutti – keyboards

== Charts ==
Chart (1984–1985)	Peak position
Austria (Ö3 Austria Top 40)	1
Sweden (Sverigetopplistan)	20
Switzerland (Schweizer Hitparade)	4
West Germany (GfK)	3
