= Hipnosis (Italian band) =

Italian Italo disco group

Hipnosis (spelt "Hypnosis" for releases outside of Italy) were an Italian Italo disco group, best remembered for their cover of Vangelis' track "Pulstar", which went Top 10 in Germany and Top 20 in Switzerland in 1983. They are also remembered for their hits "Oxygene" (1983), a cover of Jean-Michel Jarre's 1976 superhit and "Droid" (1987), a cover of Romano Musumarra and Claudio Gizzi's song.

== Discography ==
- "Oxygene"/"Bormaz" (1983) (Germany #39)
- "Pulstar"/"The End" (1983) (Germany #10, Switzerland #19, Austria #14)
- "Astrodance"/"Argonauts" (1984)
- "Hipnosis" (1984)
- "Droid"/"Automatic Piano" (1987)
