= Eurodisco =

Music genre

- Stylistic origins: Disco; Europop; electronic
- Cultural origins: 1970s, Europe
- Derivative forms: Disco polo; Electroclash; Eurodance; french house; house; Italo disco; space disco; synth-pop; synthwave

Other topics
- Discofox; List of artists

Eurodisco (also spelled as Euro disco) is a genre of electronic dance music that evolved from disco in the middle 1970s. The term "Eurodisco" first appeared in magazines geared towards popular music and was used by the UK magazine Blues & Soul to describe the music of Boney M. Music producers such as Giorgio Moroder, Frank Farian and Michael Kunze (Silver Convention) are credited as pioneers of the genre. The genre is considered to be one of the earliest forms of electronic dance music, as well as being as a precursor to later electronic music genres.

== History ==
The term "Euro-disco" was used during the mid-1970s to describe the non-UK based disco productions and artists such as D.D. Sound, West Germany groups Arabesque, Boney M., Dschinghis Khan and Silver Convention, the Munich-based production trio Giorgio Moroder, Donna Summer and Pete Bellotte, the Italian singer Gino Soccio, French artists Amanda Lear, Dalida, Cerrone, Hot Blood, Banzai (single "Viva America") and Ottawan, Dutch groups Luv' and Eurovision song contest winners Teach-In. In Spain, disco took off after the death of Francisco Franco in 1975, with Baccara. Swedish group ABBA gained the big hit "Dancing Queen". 1970s Eurodisco soon had spinoffs and variations. The most notable spin-off is space disco. Another popular variation, with no specific name, appeared in the late 1970s: a "Latin"-like sound added to the genre, which can be heard in Italy's Raffaella Carrà, La Bionda (D. D. Sound), Easy Going and France's Gibson Brothers.

German pop duo Modern Talking was an icon of Eurodisco between 1985–1987 and became the most successful Eurodisco project. That style became very popular in Eastern Europe and remained popular until the early 1990s. Next to the numerous productions of Modern Talking member Dieter Bohlen, further German-based group and artists including Arabesque, Sandra, C. C. Catch, Bad Boys Blue, and Fancy enjoyed international success. In Poland, disco polo, a local music genre relying heavily on Eurodisco was developed at the verge of the '80s and '90s. Meanwhile, a sped-up version of Eurodisco with dance-pop elements also became successful in the US, under the term "hi-NRG".

By the early 1990s, Eurodisco was influenced by the emergence of genres such as house, acid house and the electro music styles, and replaced (or evolved) by other music styles. Technically, the last form of Eurodisco is French house, a music style that appeared in France during the mid-1990s and slowly became widespread in Europe. French house is more of a "back to the roots" music style with 1970s Eurodisco influences.

== Influence outside Europe ==
The influence of Eurodisco had infiltrated dance and pop in the U.S. by 1983, as European producers and songwriters inspired a new generation of American performers. While in the U.S. disco had been declared "dead" due to backlash in 1979, subsequent European-derived successes crossing the boundaries of rock, pop, and dance, such as "Call Me" by Blondie and "Gloria" by Laura Branigan, ushered in a new era of American-fronted dance music. Branigan (produced by German producer Jack White) moved deeper into the Eurodisco style for further hits, alongside Giorgio Moroder-produced U.S. acts Berlin and Irene Cara. By 1984, musicians from many countries had begun to produce Eurodisco songs.

Among Vietnamese-diaspora community in the US, Eurodisco was referred as new wave. In Mainland China, the Eurodisco was popularized through the spread of the Eurodisco mix album Hollywood East Star Trax (shortened as Hedong in Chinese) and Master Mix (Mengshi in Chinese), compiled by DJ Alex - who at the time was a DJ in the dance club "Hollywood East" in Hong Kong. As the album circulated, "Hedong" and "Mengshi" soon became a figurative term representing Eurodisco.

== See also ==
- List of Eurodisco artists
- Eurodance
- Italo disco
