= Italo disco =

Music genre

- Stylistic origins: Eurodisco; post-disco; hi-NRG; synth-pop
- Cultural origins: Late 1970s – early 1980s, Italy
- Derivative forms: Eurobeat; Italo house; Italo dance; electroclash; synthwave; space disco; vaporwave

Other topics
- List of artists and songs; Afro/cosmic music

Italo disco or Italodisco (variously capitalized, and sometimes hyphenated as Italo-disco) is a music genre which originated in Italy in the early 1980s. Italo disco evolved from the then-current post-disco dance music and synth-pop, both domestic and foreign (hi-NRG, Euro disco) and developed into a diverse genre. The genre employs electronic drums, drum machines, synthesizers, and occasionally vocoders. It is usually sung in English, and to a lesser extent in Italian and Spanish.

The origin of the genre's name is strongly tied to marketing efforts of the ZYX record label, which began licensing and marketing the music outside Italy in 1982. (Note: Folklore that ZYX boss Bernhard Mikulski coined the term Italo-disco in 1983 was long published on Wikipedia, but is unsubstantiated;) to date, reliable third-party documentation has not been found to support whether ZYX label boss Mikulski himself named it, or whether ZYX was even the first to publish the term; it could just as easily have been a descriptor people were already using before someone at ZYX picked up on it. Italodisco faded in the early 1990s, then split into many genres (Eurobeat, Italo house, Italo dance).

== Terminology ==
The term "Italo", a generic prefix meaning Italian, had been used on pop music compilation albums in West Germany as early as 1978, such as Italo Top Hits on the K-Tel label and the first volume of Italo Super Hits on the Ariola label.

There is no documentation of where the term "Italo-Disco" first appeared, but its origins are generally traced to Italian and other European disco recordings released in the West German market. Examples include the phrase "Original Italo-Disco" on the sleeve of the West German edition of "Girls on Me" by Amin-Peck (Rome) and "Ask The Boss" by Flowchart (Bologna) in late 1982, and the 1983 compilation album The Best of Italo-Disco. These records, along with the Italo Boot Mix megamix, were released by Bernhard Mikulski on his ZYX label, who was therefore credited with coining the term "Italodisco". The Best of and Boot Mix compilations each became a 16-volume series that culminated in 1991. Both series primarily featured disco music of Italian origin, often licensed from independent Italian labels which had limited distribution outside Italy, as well as songs in a similar style by other European artists.

The presenters of the Italian music show Discoring (produced by RAI) usually referred to Italodisco tracks as "rock elettronico" (electronic rock) or "balli da discoteca" or "musica dance". The term "Italodisco" was not really used in Italy until the 2000s.

== History ==
=== Origins ===
Italo disco originated in Europe in the late 1970s. After Disco Demolition Night in 1979, American interest in disco sharply declined, whereas in Europe the genre maintained mainstream popularity and survived into the 1980s.

The adoption of synthesizers and other electronic instruments by disco artists led to electronic dance music, which spawned many subgenres such as hi-NRG in the United States and space disco in Europe. Italodisco's influences include Italian producer Giorgio Moroder, French musician Didier Marouani, Italo-French drummer Cerrone, the New York-based Bobby Orlando and the San Francisco-based Patrick Cowley, hi-NRG produces who worked with singers and performers as Divine, Sylvester and Paul Parker.

In the late 1970s, Eurodisco group D.D. Sound (La Bionda) released the song "1, 2, 3, 4, Gimme Some More", produced in Munich, Germany. In 1979, Jacques Fred Petrus and Mauro Malavasi created the soulful post-disco groups Change and B.B. & Q. Band. In 1981, both groups gained US R&B and Dance hits with "The Glow of Love", "Paradise" and "On the Beat" respectively. Although these have retrospectively been considered early examples of Italodisco, they are actually pre-electronic disco and euro disco productions, and were generally recorded abroad.

1980s Italodisco often features electronic sounds, electronic drums, drum machines, catchy melodies, vocoders, overdubs, and heavily accented English lyrics. By 1983, Italodisco's instrumentation was predominantly electronic. Along with love, Italodisco themes deal with robots and space, sometimes combining all three in songs like "Robot Is Systematic" (1982) by Lectric Workers and "Spacer Woman" (1983) by Charlie.

Then also new musical genres that had set aside the rock of the 1970s thanks to new groups, such as Duran Duran, Depeche Mode, Spandau Ballet and great pop artists Michael Jackson and Madonna. The 1980s brought the electronics with real instruments, experimenting new sounds, in short, it was a decade of great change in modern music.

— Claudio Simonetti

In 1983, there were frequent hit singles, and labels such as American Disco, Crash, Merak, Sensation and X-Energy appeared. The popular label Discomagic Records released more than thirty singles within the year. It was also the year that the term "Italodisco" became widely known, although only outside Italy, with the release of the first volumes of The Best of Italo Disco compilation series on the West German record label ZYX. After 1983, Italo-sounding tracks were also produced in countries other than Italy.

Although Italodisco was successful in mainland Europe during the 1980s, only a few singles reached the UK charts, such as Ryan Paris's "Dolce Vita", Laura Branigan's "Self Control", Baltimora's "Tarzan Boy", Spagna's "Call Me" and Sabrina's "Boys", all of which were top 5 hits. Italodisco maintained an influence in the UK's underground music scenes in the UK, and its impact can be heard in the music of several British electronic acts such as the Pet Shop Boys, Erasure and New Order.

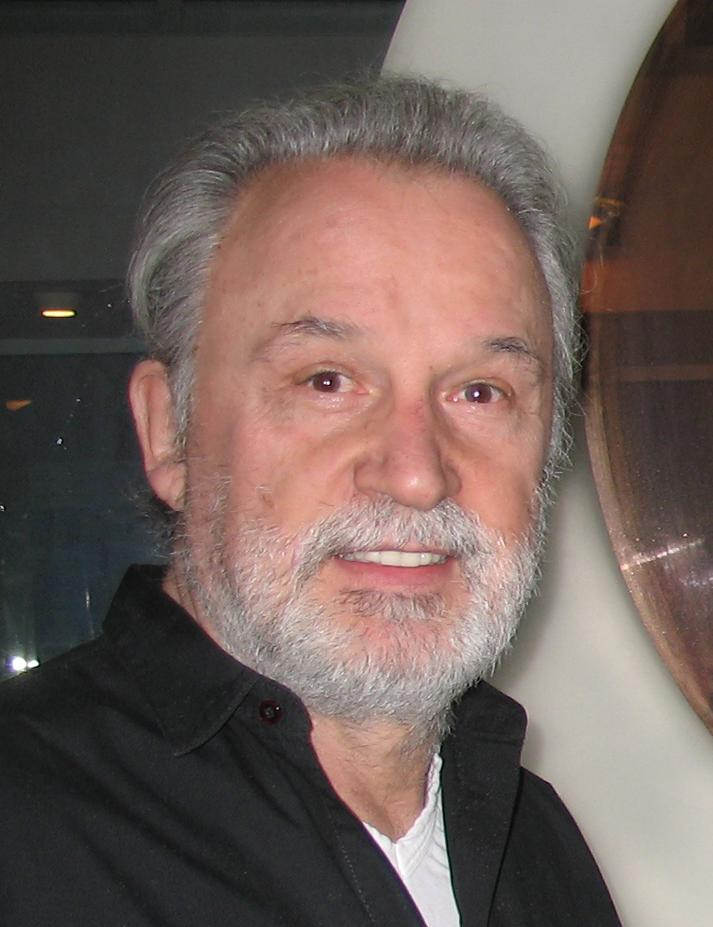
Giorgio Moroder, pioneer of Eurodisco and electronic dance music and highly influential to the Italodisco genre

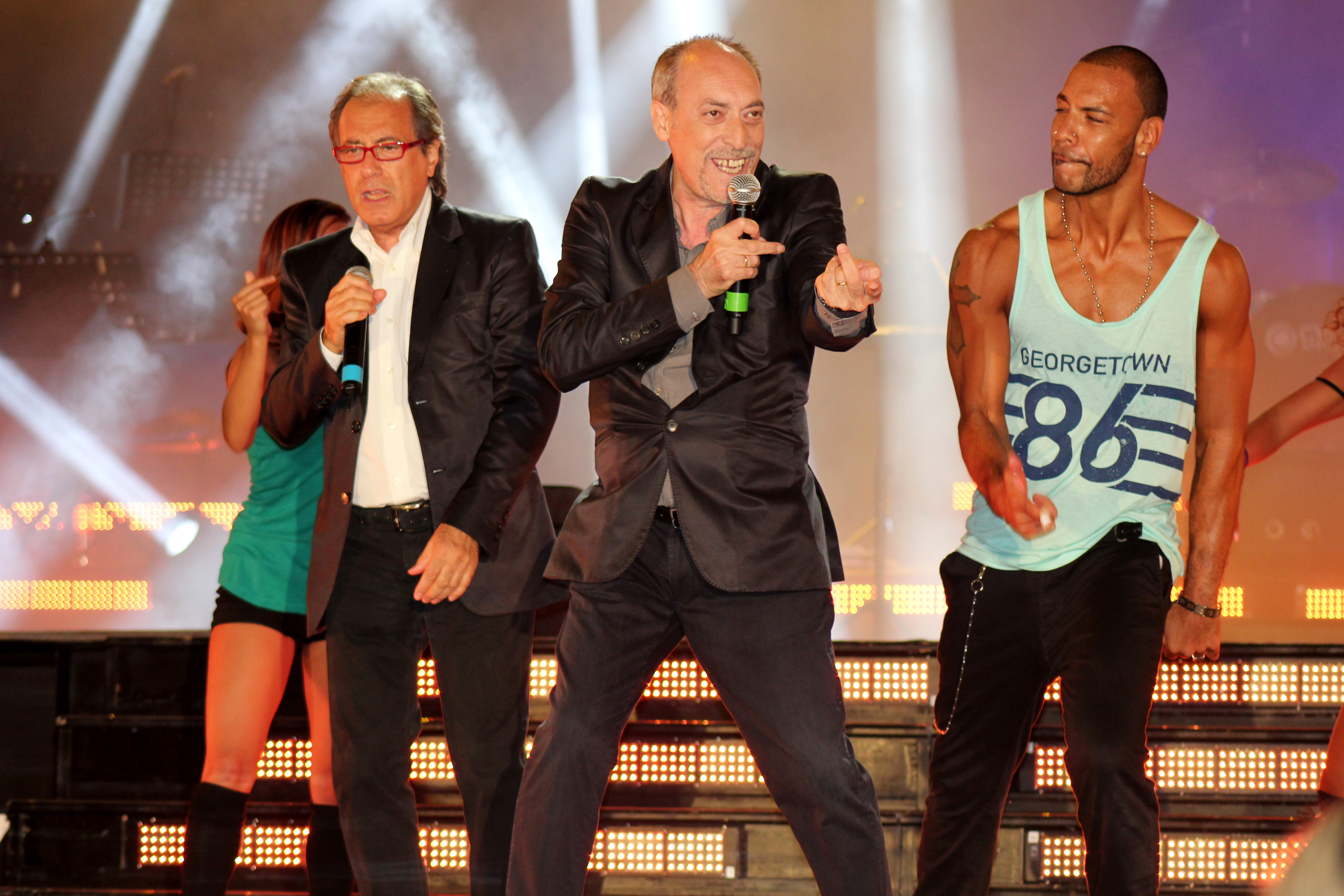
La Bionda, considered among the pioneers of Italodisco

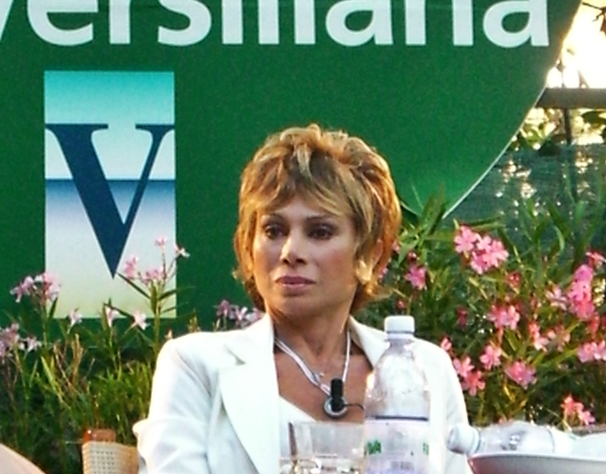
Carmen Russo

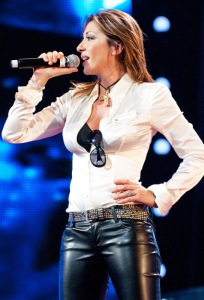
Sabrina Salerno

=== Derivative styles ===
Canada, particularly Quebec, produced several remarkable Italo-sounding acts, including Trans X ("Living on Video"), Lime ("Angel Eyes"), Rational Youth ("City of Night"), Pluton & the Humanoids ("World Invaders"), Purple Flash Orchestra ("We Can Make It"), and Tapps ("Forbidden Lover"). Those productions were called "Canadian disco" during 1980–1984 in Europe and hi-NRG disco in the U.S.

In English-speaking countries, it was called Italodisco and hi-NRG. In Mexico, the style is known just as "disco", having nothing to do with the 1970s genre. West German productions were sung in English and were characterized by an emphasis on melody, exaggerated production, and a more earnest approach to the themes of love; examples may be found in the works of: Modern Talking, Fancy, American-born singer and Fancy protégé Grant Miller, Bad Boys Blue, Joy, Silent Circle, the Twins, Lian Ross, C. C. Catch, Blue System and London Boys.

During the mid-1980s a mix of 1980s high-energy and 1970s space disco, developed. It was mostly instrumental, featured space sounds, and was exemplified by musicians, such as: Koto, Proxyon, Rofo, Cyber People, Hipnosis, Laserdance and Mike Mareen (whose music inhabited the spacesynth/hi-NRG overlap).

=== Eurobeat ===
In the late 1980s, as Italodisco declined in Europe, a handful of Italian and West German producers adapted the sound to Japanese tastes, creating "Eurobeat". Music produced in this style is sold exclusively in Japan due to the country's Para Para culture, produced by Italian producers for the Japanese market. The two most famous Eurobeat labels are A-Beat-C Records and Time Records. S.A.I.F.A.M., still produces Eurobeat music for Japan.

Around 1987 in Italy, Italodisco evolved into Italo house when Italian Italodisco artists experimented with harder beats and the "house" sound.

== Related styles and legacy ==
=== Space disco ===
Space disco
- Stylistic origins: Italo disco; Eurodisco; electro; synth-pop; cosmic disco
- Cultural origins: Mid-1970s, Europe

Local scenes
- France, Canada

Space disco is a type of dance music using synthesizers and space-like sounds and themes.

At least one modern history of "space disco" traces the genre's origins to science fiction themes (outer space, robots, and the future) in the titles, lyrics and cover artwork of dance music in the late 1970s. Plausible associations are drawn between the popularity of Star Wars (released mid-1977), the subsequent surge of interest in science fiction themes in popular culture, and the release of a number of science fiction themed and "futuristic"-sounding (synthesizer and arpeggiator-infused) disco music worldwide. The most commercially successful space disco tracks were "Star Wars Theme/Cantina Band" (1977) by Meco, and "Automatic Lover" (1978) by Dee D. Jackson, with each song reaching the top ten in a number of countries, including the United Kingdom.

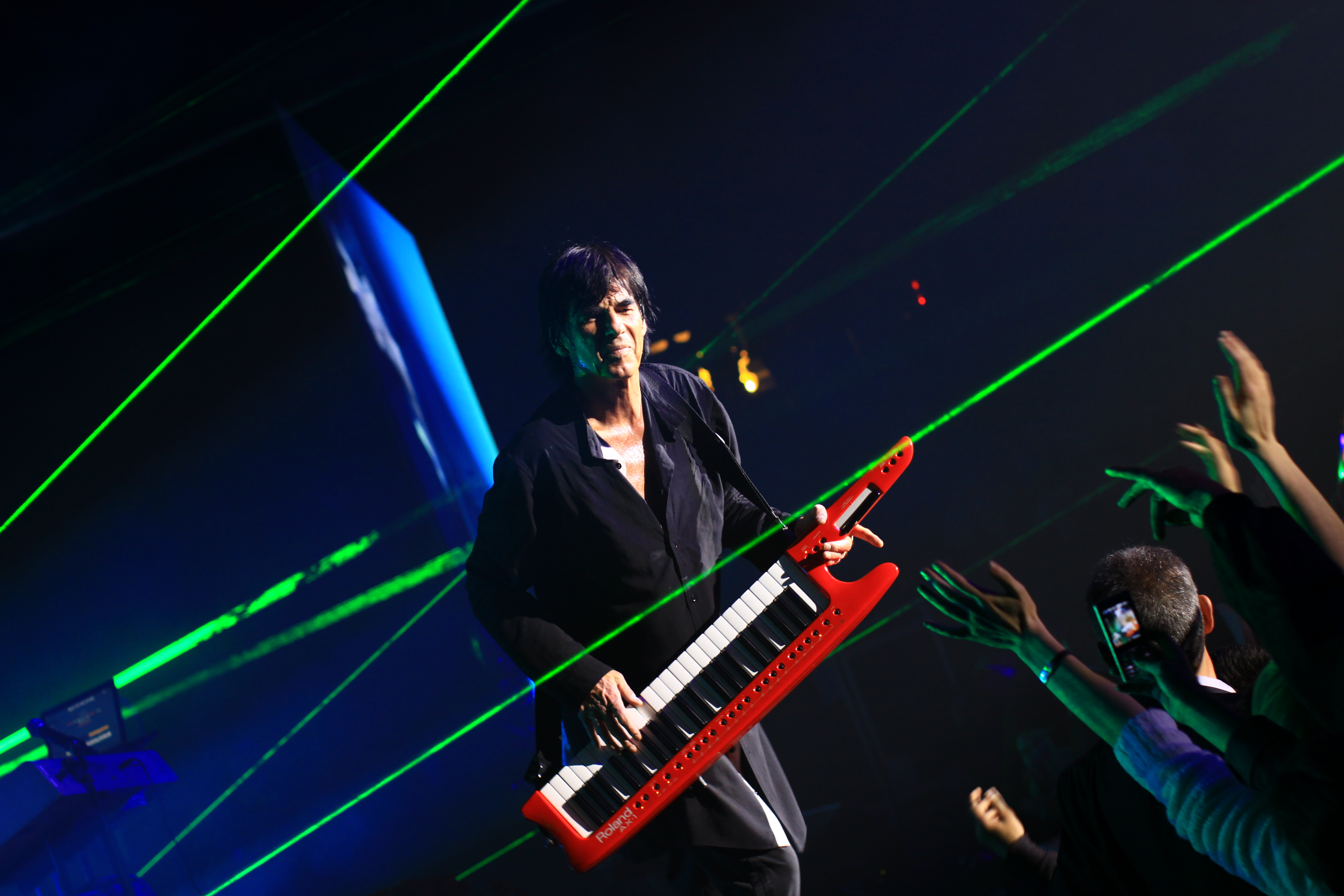
Didier Marouani, founder of Space, a pioneering space disco band

Even in Italy the Space genre had some followers, including I Signori della Galassia who showed up with glam sci-fi inspired clothes and whose album Iceman is still highly sought after by collectors today. Additional examples of space disco usually include the compositions "Just Blue" and "Symphony" (both 1978) of French band Space, the same for the track Magic Fly; additional tracks by Dee D. Jackson during the 1970s and 1980s, and "I Feel Space" by Lindstrøm.

Labels producing this type of music include

- Whatever We Want Records (Quiet Village Project, Map Of Africa, Bobby Marie) (Brooklyn, NY, US)
- Feedelity (run by Lindstrøm) (Europe)
- Eskimo (Rub'N'Tug Present Campfire mix), Bear Entertainment/Bear Funk, Prins Thomas' Full Pupp (Belgium)
- Tirk (UK) and D. C. Recordings (UK).

=== Post-disco and house music ===
New York City-based post-disco record label Emergency Records, mamanged by Italian DJ Sergio Cossa and specialized in reissuing/selling records from Italy (e.g. Kano "I'm Ready"), since the 1970s. Kano is noted for incorporating American musical elements ("heavy funk" influences, "breakbeat" rhythm, the use of vocoder) with electronic music while using rudimentary synthesizers, constituting one of the earliest forms of Italodisco. This form of Americanized Italodisco, that also includes Klein + M.B.O. ("Dirty Talk", "Wonderful", "The M. B. O. Theme"), re-entered the States and was known to be influential on the development of house music. Doctor's Cat ("Feel the Drive"), likewise, was one of the earliest "house music" songs.

Record labels include

- Emergency Records (NYC, US; 1980s)

== See also ==
- List of Italo disco artists and songs
- List of Euro disco artists
- Disco polo

== Bibliography ==
- Bottin, Guglielmo (2025). Historical Emergence and Current Uses of the Term italodisco.
- Peterink, Jeroen (2012). I Venti D'Azzurro presents The History of Italo Disco.
- Reynolds, Simon (2013). Generation Ecstasy: Into the World of Techno and Rave Culture. Routledge. ISBN 978-1-136-78316-6.
- Cataldo Verrina, Francesco (2015). The History Of Italo Disco
- Todesco, Raff (2020). ITALO DISCO: History of Dance Music in Italy from 1975 to 1988
- Halve, Michael (2022). Crazy About Italo
