= List of songs recorded by Jack de Nijs =

This is a list of songs of Jack de Nijs.

== Own releases ==
Releases as Jack Jersey or Jack de Nijs or Ruby Nash:, and or composed and or written and or arranged and or produced by Jack de Nijs.

- A Broken Heart With A Smile
- Accept My Love
- Addio Amore (Jack de Nijs)
- After All The Years
- After Sweet Memories
- A Lot Of Livin' to Do
- Al ben ik Mr. Mundy niet (Jack de Nijs)
- All I Do Is Dream
- Anak ini (Dari Cimahi)
- Angelina (Jack de Nijs)
- Anita
- Answer Me
- Asian Dreams
- At The End Of It All
- Ave Maria (This Xmas Lore)
- Ay ay waar blijft Maria (Jack de Nijs Sextet-1972)
- Baby, Can't You Feel It (Jack Jersey and The Jordanaires-live recorded)
- Be My Little Woman
- Bella Lucia (Jack de Nijs Sextet-1972)
- Berapa (How Many)
- Blame It On The Summersun (Ruby Nash)
- Blame It On The Summersun
- Blue And Lonely Christmas
- Blue Brown-Eyed Lady
- Blue Spanish Eyes
- Breaking Up
- Careless Babe (Jack Dens & The Swallows-1961)
- Christina (Jack de Nijs Sextet)
- Close To You
- Come On
- Conny
- Daisy Bell (Ruby Nash)
- Dark Moon
- Der Weg zu Dir
- Devil in disguise
- Don't Break This Heart
- Don't
- Don't be Cruel
- Dreamer
- Dreams Gonna be Real (Jack Dens & The Swallows-1960)
- Du bist 'ne Lady und ich bleib' ein Vagabund
- Eiland in de zon
- Ein Wunderbares Mädchen
- Elisa (Jack de Nijs)
- Forever
- Geen poen voor Barcelona (Jack de Nijs)
- Gelukkig Kerstfeest (War Is Over) (Artists for Ronald McDonaldhuis)
- Get Your Fun
- Give Me Love
- Give Me Time (The Losers-1966)
- Gone
- Gone Girl
- Gone Girl Xmas version
- Goodbye My Love (My Nona Manis)
- Got A Lot Of Livin' To Do
- Got no home
- Good Old Sunshine
- Happy X-mas (War Is Over) (Artist for Ronald McDonaldhuis)
- Health of Freedom
- Heaven in Your Eyes (Jack Dens & The Swallows-1961)
- Heaven Is My Woman's Love
- Heaven's no more heaven
- Heavenly Woman (The Four Sweeters-1960)
- Hee dans met mij (Jack de Nijs Sextet)
- Hé Hé Rosie (Jack de Nijs)
- Helena (Jack de Nijs)
- Helena
- Hello Darling
- Help Me Make It Through The Night
- Here Comes Summer
- Here i am Acapulco
- Het spijt me voor jou (Jack de Nijs)
- Higher Than The Mountains
- His Latest Flame
- Home Little Home (The Four Sweeters-1960)
- Honey Babe
- Honky Tonk Man (Jack Jersey and The Jordanaires-live recorded)
- How Many
- Hurry Home
- I Can Stand Tomorrow
- I Can't Help Thinking
- I Can't Wait For Tomorrow
- I Wonder (Jack Jersey And The Jordanaires-live recorded)
- I Won't Cry
- If You Leave Me
- Ik kan 't niet laten (Jack de Nijs)
- I'll Be Home On Christmas Eve
- I'll Be Lonely (The Four Sweeters-1960)
- I'll Hold Your Hand
- I'll Hold Your Hand (Jack Jersey And The Jordanaires-live recorded)
- I'll Miss You (Jack Jersey and The Jordanaires- live recorded)
- I'll Miss You
- I'm Calling
- Ingatan Indah Waktu Natal (Merry Christmas, Sweet Memory)
- In Old Mexico
- In The Arms Of Her New Friend
- In The Still Of The Night
- In The Still Of The Night (Jack Jersey and The Jordanaires-live recorded)
- Ist die Liebe vorbei?
- It's A Beautiful Day
- I was a fool
- Juanita
- Just One Time
- Keep It In The Middle
- Keep On Rollin'
- Keep On Shakin'
- Kesepian (Gone Girl)
- Lady
- Lean On Me
- Let It Be Me
- Let's Come Together Now
- Lieve Heer, Heb Medelij (Jack de Nijs)
- Little Snowflakes
- Lonely Christmas
- Lonely Linda
- Lonely Me
- Lonely Street
- Love Letters
- Love Lovin' Lover
- Love Me Petunia
- Love me Tender
- Lucille (Jack and Woody-1960)
- Marian (Jack de Nijs Sextet)
- Malam Kudus (Silent Night)
- Maryati
- Mary
- Mary Jane
- Mary Lee (Jack Jersey And The Jordanaires-live recorded)
- Mary Lee (Live in Indonesia)
- Me And Bobby McGee
- Mein Herz ist wieder allein
- Melancholy Man
- Merry Christmas, Sweet Memory
- Mexico (The Losers-1965)
- Mexico
- Mexico, Mexico, Mexico
- Mexican Lady
- Mengapa kau Menangis
- Mi Bonita
- Missing You, That's What I Do
- Moon Of The Blues
- My Broken Memories
- My Father's House
- My Love is True
- Never Ending Lonely Nights
- Never Got No Home
- Never Leave me Lonely
- Nina Bobo
- Nou, nou waar blijf je dan (Jack de Nijs)
- No Other Love
- No Regrets
- Oh daar heb je ze weer (Jack de Nijs)
- Ole Sio
- On This Night Of A Thousand Stars
- One Day At A Time (Jack Jersey and The Jordanaires-live recorded)
- Only A Fool
- Olé we gaan naar Spanje (Jack de Nijs)
- O,O...zit het zo (Jack de Nijs)
- Op dat eiland in de zon
- Papa Was A Poor Man
- Papa Was A Poor Man (Jack Jersey and The Jordanaires-live recorded)
- Papa Was A Poor Man - Live In Indonesia
- Paulette (Jack and Woody-1960)
- Picture On The Wall
- Please don't go
- Play That Song
- Pretend
- Pretty Rocking Shoes (The Four Sweeters-1960)
- Puerto de Llansa.../Oh Lady Rose
- Ramblin' Man
- Ready Teddy (live recording)
- Rub It In (Jack Jersey And The Jordanaires-live recorded)
- Sail Me Across The Water
- Santa Claus
- Santa Lucia
- Send A Little Bit Of Love (Jack Jersey and Lisa MacKaeg)
- Sentimental Me
- Shanah
- She Was Dynamite
- Sheila
- She's Not You
- Silent Night
- Silvery Moon
- Since You've Been Gone
- Since You've Gone (The Losers-1965)
- Sing Me Back Home
- Singaraja (Trincomalee)
- Sofia Loren (Jack de Nijs)
- Sophia Loren (Jack de Nijs Sextet)
- So Sad (Jack and Woody-1960)
- Spanish Lady
- Sri Lanka... My Shangri-La
- 63784
- Stay 'till Tomorrow (Jack Jersey and The Jordanaires-live recorded)
- Stapel op Lou Lou (Jack de Nijs)
- Speel mijn lied (Jack de Nijs)
- Step Into My Heart
- Surrender
- Suspicious Minds
- Sweet Dreams (My Darlin')
- Sweet Ol' Dreams
- Tears
- The Jerkin'Tree (The Losers-1966)
- The reasons why
- They Say (Jack and Woody-1960)
- The Sun Ain't Gonna Shine Anymore
- There Goes My Everything
- This Christmas Lore
- This Means Goodbye
- 'Till The End Of Time (Jack Jersey and The Jordanaires-live recorded)
- 'Till The End Of Time
- Tonight Is Allright For Love
- Too Old To Believe
- Trincomalee
- Una Noche Mexicana
- Vaya Con Dios
- Viva Mexico
- Voodoo Hits Me
- Waktu Potong Padi
- Was vorbei ist, ist vorbei
- Way Down Low
- Wendy
- White Christmas
- Why Me Lord
- Wie wunderbar
- Won't you anymore (Jack Dens & The Swallows-1960)
- Woman
- Yesterday Guy
- You treat me wrong
- You're Not Gonna See Me Cryin'
- You're The One, You're the only
- You're The Only Inspiration
- You're The Only Reason
- Zomerzon (Jack de Nijs Sextet)

== Songs for other artists ==
The following songs are recorded and released for other artists and or composed and or written and or arranged and or produced by Jack de Nijs.

=== André Moss ===
André Moss is a Dutch saxophonist

- Ella (TROS-Tune)
- Rosita (TROS-Tune)
- Argentina (W.K. '78 Tune)
- Auf Wiedersehen Athene
- Let The Bouzoukis Play
- My Spanish Rose
- Brigitte Bardot
- Laura (TROS-Tune)
- De winters waren koud
- El Torero
- This is My Shangrila
- Viva Gerona
- Theme For Maria
- Melody Of Love
- Restless Love
- Sweet Maria
- Nine Five O
- Only Dreams
- Rain In Spain
- De deur staat altijd open
- Dressed In Black
- Het stadje Kufstein
- Lady Killer
- La Puente
- Met de vlam in de pijp
- Oh Heideroosje
- Sylvia's Wedding
- El Zorro
- Sylvia's Dream
- Sunday Morning
- Roberto
- Rose-Valley
- Sombras
- 3000 Miles From Home
- Soletario
- Carnival in Holland
- Dansen is plezier voor twee
- La Paloma
- Autumn Song
- Lady in Blue
- A Waste Of Time
- El Vida
- Mary Ann
- Mariandel
- Raindrops
- Glenn's Party
- Fly Me To Bali
- Behind The Clouds
- Mademoiselle Monique
- Para Ti (TROS-Tune)
- Fiesta at Night
- Simply ‘cause I Like It
- Tumbling Tumble Weeds
- My Happiness
- Raunchy
- Oh Mein Papa
- Blue Tango
- Wheels
- Sail Along Silvery Moon
- The French Song
- Cherry Pink and Apple Blossom White
- The Song from Moulin Rouge
- The Twinkle in Your Eyes
- Lady Of My Life
- That Old Feeling
- Yesterday On My Mind
- Take Me to Your Heaven
- The Tears In Your Eyes
- Roberto and Monica

=== Bata Illic ===
- Juanita
- Der Apfel fällt nicht weit vom Stamm (Peaches On A Tree)
- Auf der Staße der Sehnsucht (Answer Me)

=== Jack Jackson ===
Alias of guitarist Jacques Verburgt

- Argentina (W.K. 1978 Tune)
- Pour Monique (TROS-Tune)
- Barbarella
- Für Maria (TROS-Tune
- Behind The Clouds
- Take Your Time
- La Comparsa (TROS-Tune)
- Driftin'John
- The Tears In Your Eyes
- Nana's smile
- Not For Sale
- Valley Of Dreams
- Way Back Home
- Hip To The Guitar Man

=== Nick MacKenzie ===
- Juanita
- One is One
- Peaches on a Tree
- Der Apfel fällt nicht weit vom Stamm
- Please, Let me come on board
- In Old Mexico
- Hug Me
- Tell the World
- Got No Home
- Answer Me
- Te Voljo
- Lana
- Mona
- Oh Woman
- You can go your own way
- What can I do
- Mr. Lonesome
- A little bit closer
- If you meet her
- Lollipop
- Sweet little sixteen
- Time will show
- What kind of man
- Fraulein
- Holiday Hotel
- The Wrong Horse
- It's Over
- Anita
- (Ba-Ba)-Beach Party
- Elena
- Lembo Tree (remix)
- You can light up...
- Long Distance Heartbreak
- I'm dreamin'
- We all get lucky sometimes
- Saved by The Grace of Your Love
- If you happen to see my woman
- Too Old (Too Old to Believe...)
- Don't Let It Be Over
- Good Times

=== Frank & Mirella ===
- Verliefd, Verloofd, Getrouwd
- Niemand anders
- In onze luchtballon
- Morgenvroeg
- Stille liefde, stil verdriet
- Roberto & Monica
- In het diepst van je hart
- Manuel (Manuel goodbye)
- Santa Domingo's gitaren
- Cher Ami
- Mexico oh Mexico
- Met jou alleen
- Mandolinen klinken zacht
- Stop
- Héla, kom met me mee ja
- Als het om de liefde gaat
- Amore
- Op dat plein
- Little bit closer
- Good Times
- Gone With Yesterday
- Had ik maar money
- Wat ik zou willen
- Ga je met me mee?
- Santa Lucia
- Vergeet de dag van morgen
- Als je weer komt
- O Acapulco
- Little Snowflakes
- Ik zie een ster

=== Maurice de la Croix ===
Maurice de la Croix is a Dutch saxophonist

- Juliana... Ratu Negeri Blanda (With children's choir)
- Fly me to Bali TROS tune
- Kembang Melati
- Bengawan Solo
- Toradja
- Mama's Melody
- Broken Clove Melody
- Goro Goro Ne
- A Heart's Been Broken
- Indo Eyes
- Tjamahi, Tanah Air Ku
- Patah Tjinke

=== Others ===
Andy Tielman

- Say a Simple Word
- Manolito
- Widouri

André van Duin

- Die Tijd Van Vroeger (Weet Je Nog Die Tijd Van Vroeger

Zangeres Zonder Naam

- Jongen
- In een Gouden lijstje
- (Kom bij mij...) In Eenzame Nachten
- In Santa Domingo
- In de haven klinkt een lied
- Het moedertje
- Zeg oude muzikant
- Oh Pappie toe drink niet
- Billy Joe
- Zoals vroeger
- Napoli

Rudi Carrell

- Wer kann Heut' noch richtig Flirten (Weet je nog... Die tijd van vroeger)

Ray Miller

- Gina
- Engelchen
- Antoinette
- Sophia (Sophia Loren)
- Angelika

Ray Ventura et son orchestre

- Les Annees Passent

Ria Valk

- Met Iwan op de Divan
- Fotomodel
- Willem Willem

Conny Vink

- Dansen is plezier voor twee
- In Petersburg

Tony Bass

- Gina Lollobrigida
- Elisa

The Buffoons

- Pack Your Back

Luc Bral

- Hallo, hier ben ik dan
- Hé, Hé het is zomer
- Hou van mij
- Zonder jou

Johnny Jordaan

- O, Sjaan

Jan Boezeroen

- Ze Zeggen...
- Oei, Oei
- De Fles
- Bananenlied
- Jouw laatste brief
- Midden in de nacht
- O Daar heb je ze weer
- Meneer de Ooievaar
- Lena, waar zit je nou
- Nog ééntje dan
- Hé, hé...kijk daar eens
- Angelica
- O wat zie ik
- Het whiskey lied
- Ik heb niks gezien
- Een neutje
- Boko Boko
- Kleine vent
- Alida
- O daar komt gedonder van
- Het is voorbij
- Sjane, Sjane, Sjane
- Een zeemansvrouw
- Lieve meid
- Olleke Bolleke
- Als de rimpels in jouw voorhoofd konden praten

Leo den Hop

- Oh Antoinette
- Morgen een kater
- Je bent de sigaar
- Jij verandert als het weer
- In de Hemel is geen bier
- Daar hebben we balen van
- Petite Mademoiselle
- Zo is het leven

Donna Lynton

- (Theme from) Charlie's Angels
- If You Need Somebody
- Woman With A Smile

Peter Wiedemeyer

- (Weet je nog...) Die tijd van vroeger
- De straat
- De winters waren koud
- Eva
- In de regen
- Zeven dagen

Clover Leaf

- Time Will Show
- Don't spoil my day
- What kind of man
- Grey Clouds
- Love Really Changed Me
- Time Of Troubles
- Girl Where Are You Going To
- Tell The World
- Woman
- If you meet her

Road

- Never leave me lonely
- Time Of Troubles
- Sweet Little Sixteen

Moan

- Health of freedom

Pete & Jackson

- Think It Over
- Are You Leaving Me

Frank en Nadine (Saxophone players)

- CD Album: Ode aan André Moss
- A song for André
- Ella
- Rosita
- Laura
- Tears In Your Eyes
- Cindy On My Mind
- Tell Me Why
- Para Tí
- Sombras
- Let the Bouzouki's play
- My Spanish Rose
- Dressed in black
- Behind the clouds
- El Zorro
- Fly Me To Bali
- A Little Bit Of Love

Ilse de Graaff

- For You
- I'll Miss You

The Typhoons

- Fanny
- Blijf bij mij

Peter Vee

- Everyday I Want You

Birger Højland

- En Tur Til Barcelona
- Ud I Det Fri

Cock van der Palm

- De “Gouden” Jack de Nijs- medley (a: Boko Boko – b: Boemerang – c: Hou alles in het midden – d: Al zijn m’n centen naar de maan – e: Hé hé kijk daar eens – f: Het is voorbij – g: Boko Boko)
- Mira
- Addio Amore
- De laatste tango
- Glaasje op
- (We gaan...) Naar Boven
- Al gaan m'n centen naar de maan...
- Andrea
- Donna Maria

Eddy Hense

- (nooit vergeet ik meer) Die Nacht

Jan Mol en de Meestampers (Jan Mol, Prince Carnival of the city Roosendaal Netherlands.)

- Protest
- Ik kan het niet laten
- Sofie

De Meestampers

- O Heineken bier
- Ik kan d'r niks an doen
- Tip van Bootz
- Nog eentje dan...

Harmen Veerman

- Lady Of The Night
- Too Old To Believe In You
- Picture On The Wall
- Mexican Maria

Brabants Bont (Artiestenkoor;Jack de Nijs, Wil de Bras, Leo den Hop, Yvonne de Nijs, Jan Boezeroen)

- Protest
- Zeg nu Ja voor Veronica

Rossa Nova

- Brigitte Bardot
- Juanita mi amore

De Mounties

- Alida
- Het Is Voorbij
- Laat de Dokter (nu) maar schuiven (film-tune) (Let the Doctor Shove)
- Op het Hoekje brandt nog licht

Yvonne de Nijs

- Waar de Wilde Rozen Bloeien
- Stop nou eens
- Je weet toch wel wat liefde is
- Balalaika

Tony Martin

- Op een eiland in de zon
- Jane
- Ciao Carina
- Got No Home
- Blame It On The Summersun
- Ramona
- Mary Ann
- Sweet Nothings
- Sibony
- Veronica

Joe Boston Group

- All My Sorrow
- The World I'm Livin'In

Jan Beton

- Van de Ouwerwetse
- Annemarie

John Hendrikx

- Cry Softly Lonely One
- I'm Dreamin' Dreams
- I Wouldn't Give You Up
- It's Time For Cryin'
- Judy
- Love Became A Memory

De Dubbeldekkers

- Een neutje
- Boko Boko
- Ughe, Ughe, Ughe
- Aloha, mijn bruine Madonna

Trio '67

- Annemarie
- Hé, hé Rosie
- Annie
- Co zit in 'n commune
- Sjane, Sjane, Sjane

Sjakie Schram

- Zuster, oh zuster

Dennie Christian

- Waar gaat de wereld naar toe

Wil de Bras

- Die nacht
- Hé Hé Rosie
- El Zorro
- Christina
- El Vida
- Après toi
- Mary Ann
- Mona
- Sombras
- Anna
- Het spijt me voor jou
- Donna
- Waar zijn al mijn dromen
- Laat hem toch gaan
- Och was ik maar...
- Mademoiselle Monique
- Nooit op zondag
- Meisjes uit Casablanca
- Jij hebt hier niks te vertellen
- Rumba Banana

De Pedro's

- Een laatste kans
- Schaduwen (Sombras)

Crown's Clan

No Place For Our Minds

Lisa MacKeag

- Send a Little Bit Of Love (duet with Jack Jersey)
- Moon Of Matara
- Maratap Hati
- Bengawan Solo
- Selendang Sutra
- Lonely Blue Boy
- Good Ol' Sunshine
- Wake Me Up
- It's A Beautiful Day
- Geronimo
- Hold me
- Don't Ever Change Your Mind
- For You

Mac Doodle

- Drink Lisa drink
- Pretty Rose From Amsterdam
- Dat gaat altijd zo
- De Heilsoldaat

Vincent (Vinzzent)

- Gone
- Hurry Home
- I Can't help Thinking
- Sheila

Ferry Ripson

- Playboy
- Please Don't Go
- Kiss Me Once...Kiss Me Twice

Frank & Jenny

- Sha La La La Vie
- Leven

Frank Michael

- Célina (Blue Brown Eyed Lady)
- Schiavi D'Amore (I'm Calling)
- C'est Fini (Lonely Me)
- Tendres Rockers (Don't Break This Heart)

René Schuurmans

- Helena
- Samen (Woman)
- Samen met jou (Puerto de Llansa...Oh Lady Rose)/Since you've been gone

Frans Bauer & Marianne Weber

- Wat ik zou willen

Vader Abraham

- Ik leef om te leven
- Vlaanderen

The Shorts

- Comment ça va
- One pair
- Een beetje vuur
- Ik zing
- Springtime
- I'm a musician
- Je suis, tu es
- Subway Love
- I'm saving
- Annabelle
- Goodbye, don't cry

Roy Ascott

- So Everybody Dance
- I Can't Help Thinking
- If There is Sunshine
- When My Little Girl Is Smiling

Milly en de Mooks

- Waarom liet ik jou alleen
- Ik zie je nu met andere ogen

Tumult

- Marleen
- Zaterdagavond

Oscar Benton

- You and I
- Let Me Be Your Day
- Can I Reach You
- So Everybody Dance...(and drink all night...)
- Spanish Lady
- Never Never Leave Me
- Baby Help Me

Herbert Verhaeghe

- Godenkind (Silvery Moon)
- Koud en eenzaam (Lonely Christmas)

Frank Evans (Frank Ashton)

- Reno Town (the winning song of the Soundmixshow in 1986)
- Sheila
- Hallo Aline
- Hello Darling

Arne Jansen & Les Cigales

- Jenny
- Ladykiller
- Judy

Henk Damen

- Jongen (Duet met Zangeres Zonder Naam)

De Tunes

- Doe toch niet zo stoer man (Papa Was A Poor Man)

Gérard Croce

- Des Femmes et Du Bon Vin

Peter Koolen

- Juanita

Robby

- Judy
- Ginny weet je niet
