= Jack Jersey =

Dutch singer, composer, arranger, lyricist and record producer

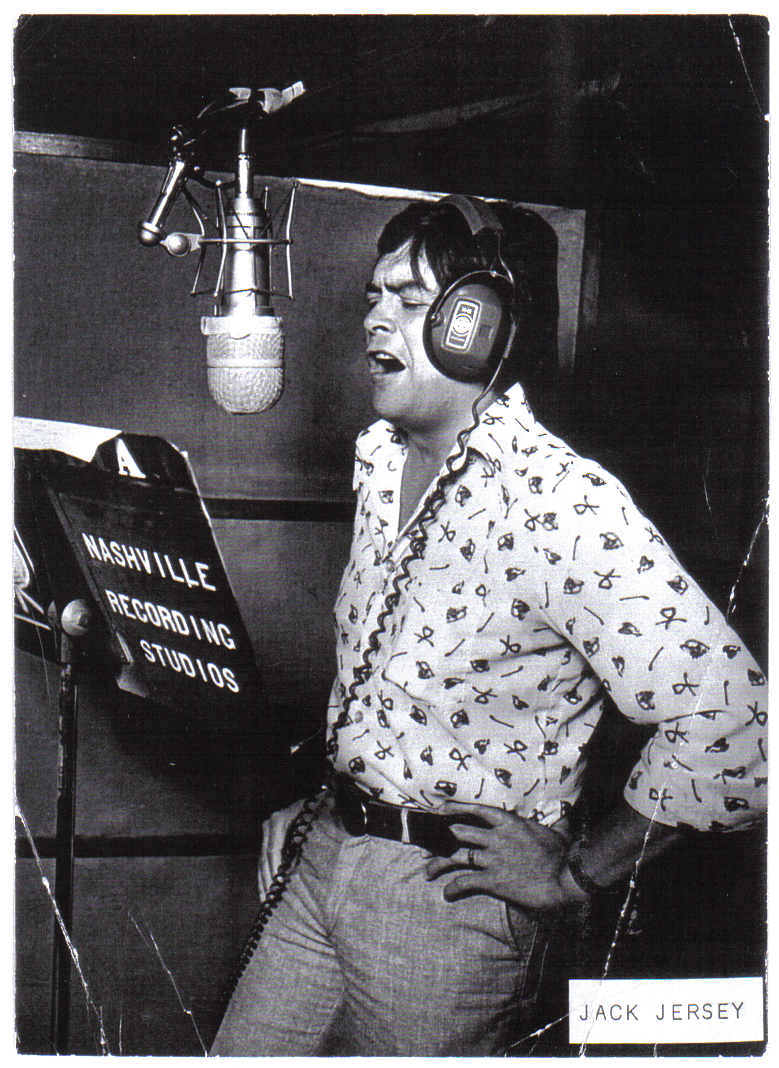
- Jack Jersey recording live album in one of the Nashville recording studios with The Jordanaires, 1974.

Background information
- Also known as: Jack Jersey, Ruby Nash
- Born: Jack Willem de Nijs; 18 July 1941; Tjimahi, Dutch East Indies
- Died: 26 May 1997 (aged 55) Roosendaal, Netherlands
- Genres: country rock, pop rock, pop
- Occupations: Composer, lyricist, arranger, music producer, singer, musician
- Instruments: ukulele, piano, guitar, vocals
- Years active: 1960–1997
- Labels: Polydor, EMI, Universal Music
- Website: (in Dutch) Jack Jersey official website

Jack (Willem) de Nijs, artist name Jack Jersey (18 July 1941 – 26 May 1997), was a Dutch singer, composer, arranger, lyricist and record producer of light music (popular music) who worked for national and international artists. He had his own production company, J.R. (Jeetzi-Rah) which means "Creation" / "Creational world" in Hebrew. He discovered artists such as André Moss, Nick MacKenzie and Frank & Mirella. During his life, Jack de Nijs and the artists he represented were good for selling more than twenty million records.

== Biography ==
=== The first years ===
Jack de Nijs was born in 1941 at Tjimahi in West Java, Indonesia. At the age of seven he received a Ukulele as a present, and was soon allowed to play in the local village band. At a young age he showed talent as a musician and composer. In 1951 the family moved to the Netherlands, where he came into contact with a different life and music style. During high school he started his first band, named The Dixie Stampers, with jazz and dixieland music.

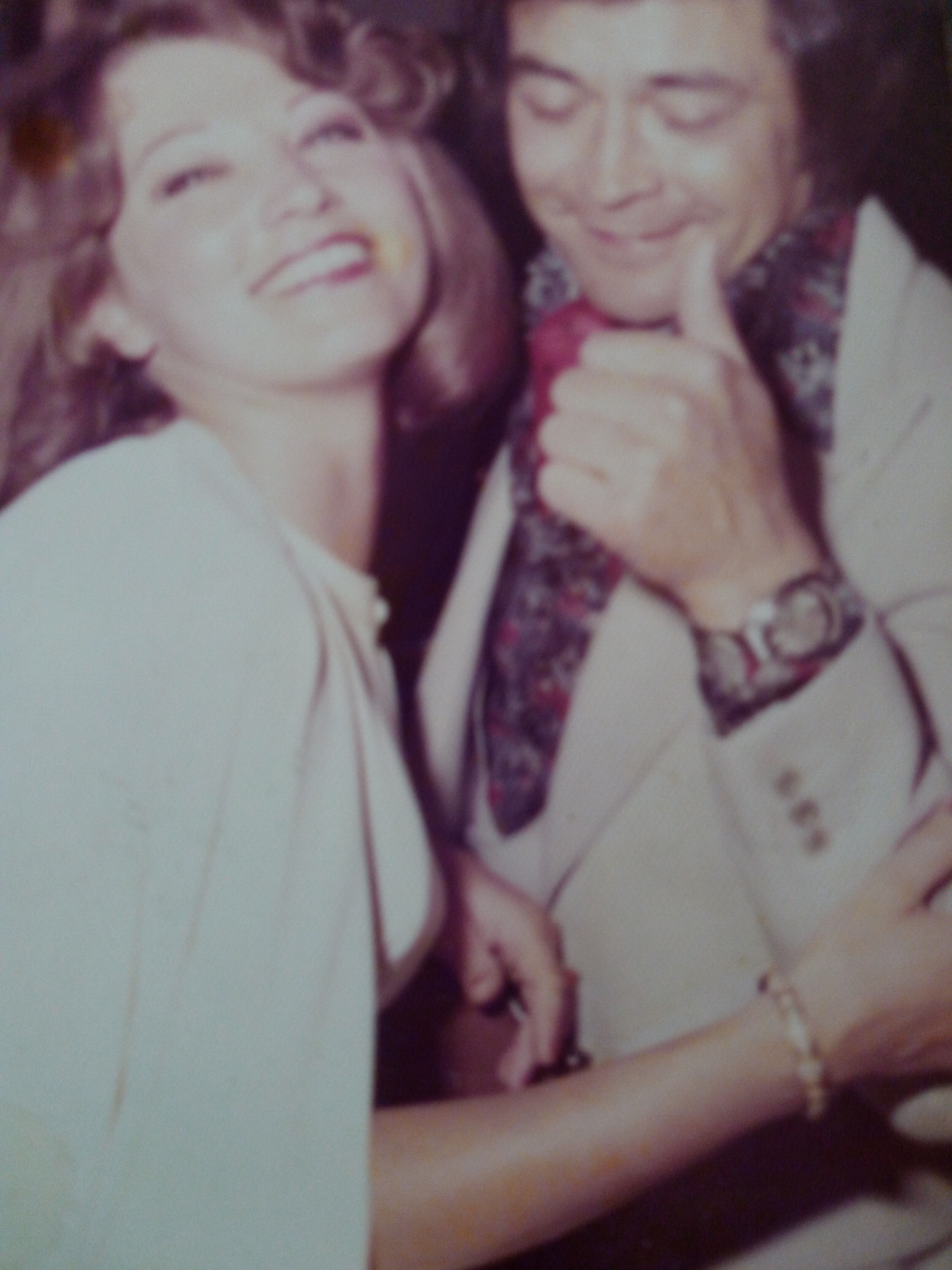
Elly and Jack de Nijs

After leaving high school, he went to a college for Higher Hotel Management in Maastricht. Here he formed his second band, a quartet known as The Four Sweeters and afterwards he continued in Jack & Woody. All together they released more than ten records. According to the record company Bovema/EMI the song called Paulette of Jack & Woody climbed to the top in the charts of Singapore and also in Peru. The Four Sweeters with the song I'll be lonely became a success in Belgium.

After Jack & Woody he became the lead singer of The Losers, from 1964 to 1967. They were signed by CNR that promoted them and some other bands as Beat from Holland. In 1965 their first single Since You're Gone / Mexico was released. Only the first, however, is a beat song. The second is a cover version of Elvis Presley from his film Fun in Acapulco (1963). It was written by the Peruvian composer Francis Lopez. Over there, in Peru, this song became a number No. 1 hit.

After receiving his diploma for Higher Hotel Management (BBA), Jersey gave up his aspiration to make a success of the music business. In the meantime he married Ella and started to work for a multinational.

=== Return ===
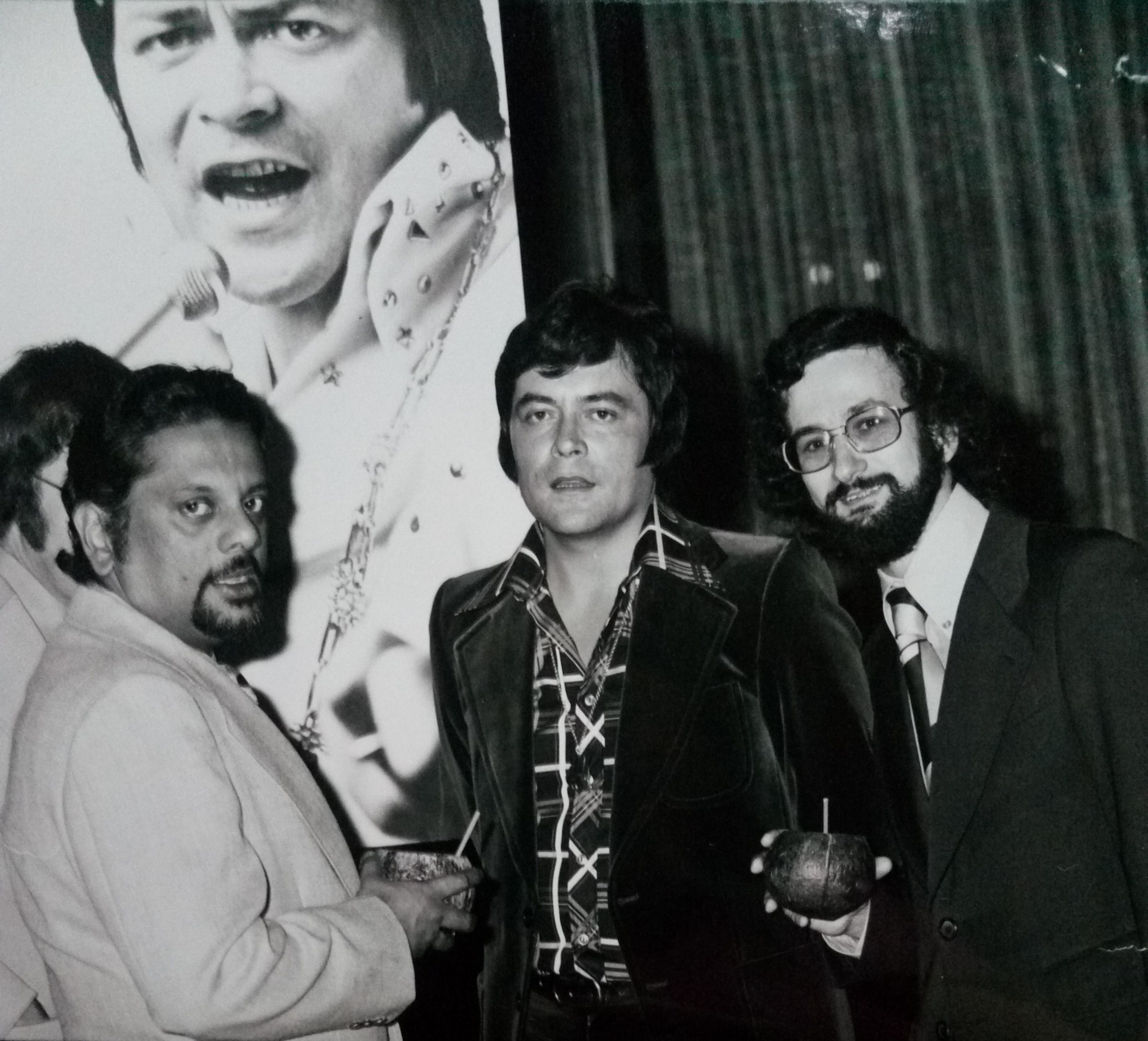
Roel Kruize, Bhaskar Menon, Jack Jersey and Theo Roos, 1974

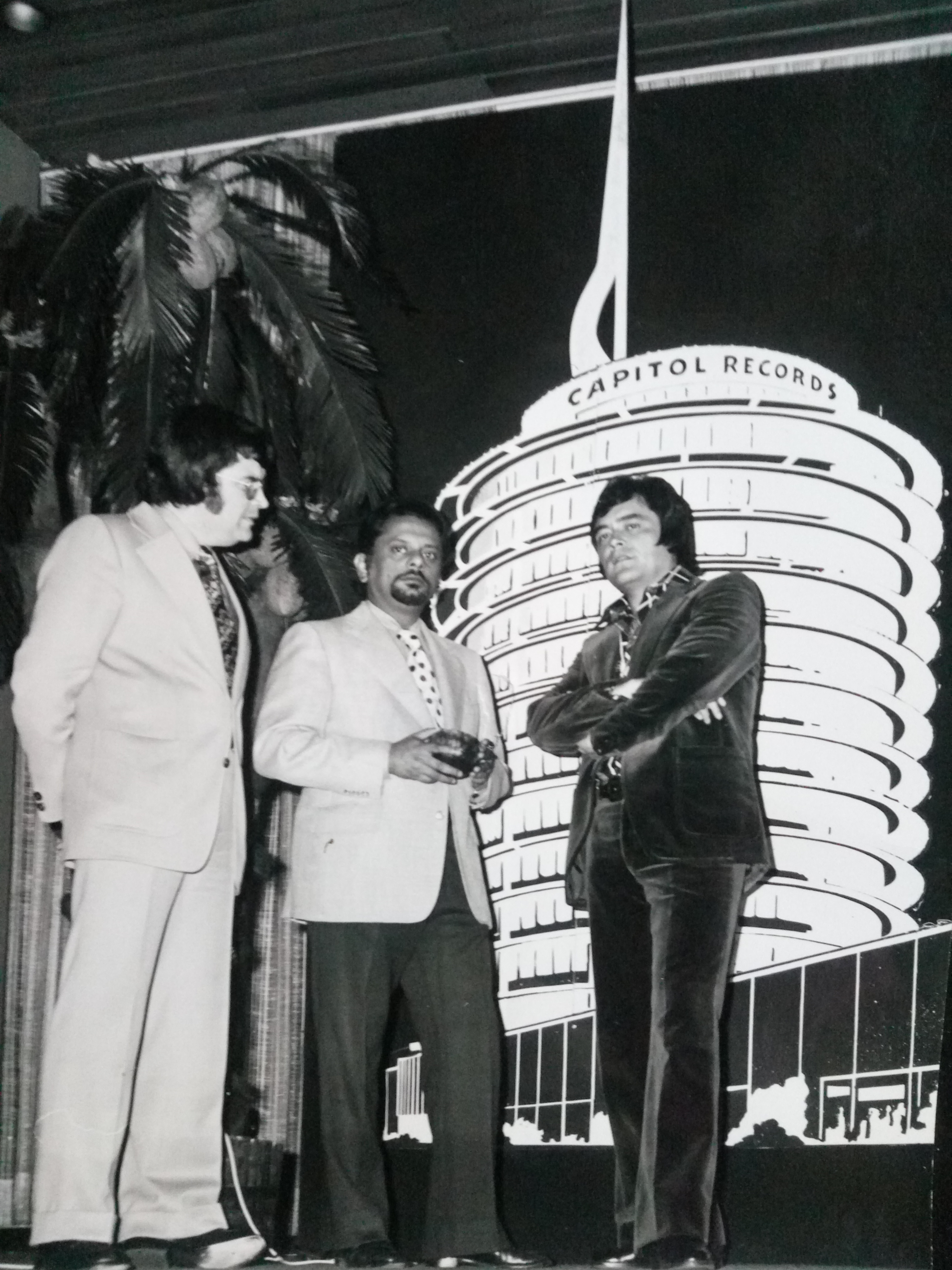
Roel Kruize, Bhaskar Menon and Jack Jersey, 1974

Music was much too appealing and he decided to give it a try again. He changed his approach and started working as a producer and composer for a record company. After teaming up with Henk Voorheijen he got a contract with Polydor Records for 500 Dutch Guilders a month. His first hit Oh...Antoinette was released by Leo den Hop. One of the following hits was Gina Lollobrigida (about the so called actress). He released Sofia Loren (1970) on a single. Both songs were recorded by the singer Ray Miller (Rainer Müller) as well who had two hits with them in Germany.

In 1971, De Nijs recorded Blame It on the Summersun under the artist name Ruby Nash. This was his first English language recording. He started his own production company, and Henk Voorheijen participated for business matters. Meanwhile, he was father of a son and a daughter who he, however, hardly saw.

=== Jack Jersey ===
A couple of singles later he changed his name to Jack Jersey and continued singing in English. Jersey refers to the British island near France. It heralded a successful period in his music career, with some international hits.

His first English single I'm Calling (1973) was declared Alarm Disc at Radio Veronica and became his first major hit in the Netherlands and Belgium. Hits that followed were In The Still of the Night, Papa Was A Poor Man and Blue Brown Eyed Lady. His biggest hit was Sri-Lanka ... My Shangri-La that charted in the Netherlands, Belgium, Germany, Switzerland and Austria.

In 1973 he was member of the group Brabants Bont, with artists like Yvonne de Nijs, Leo den Hop, Jan Boezeroen en Wil de Bras. In 1974 his album In The Still of the Night peaked at No. 3 in the album top of Radio Hilversum 3.

=== Nashville ===
Invited by Capitol Records he recorded a live-album in 12 hours in Nashville with The Jordanaires, the group that had accompanied Elvis Presley for many years. (This entire live-album recording took only 12 hours, while in the Netherlands that applies to a recording of only 1 song.) For the European market it was released as I Wonder and for the American market as Honky Tonk Man.

In the meantime he wrote, composed and produced many songs for many other artists, like Nick MacKenzie, André Moss, Jan Boezeroen, Ria Valk and Frank en Mirella. He wrote the Dutch lyrics and produced the song Comment ça va of The Shorts. They had international hits with songs of Jack de Nijs. His songs were recorded by, among others, Zangeres Zonder Naam, Andy Tielman and the Tielman Brothers and the American singer Donna Lynton.

During his life, Jack de Nijs and the artists he represented were good for selling more than twenty million records.

=== Radio Veronica Jingle ===
Radio Veronica was the first radio station in the Netherlands to introduce jingles. Of the thousands of jingles used by Veronica, 100 jingles were selected and they were released on an LP record in 1977. Jack Jersey also appeared on a jingle on this elpee/LP.

This jingle His latest flame is sung in Dutch, better said, spoken, like several jingles on this elpee/LP: 8 januari is Elvis dag op 538. (In English: 8 January, it's Elvis day on 538) The compilation of this elpee/LP was made by two well known Dutch disc-jockeys, Lex Harding and Adje Bouman.

=== Honour ===
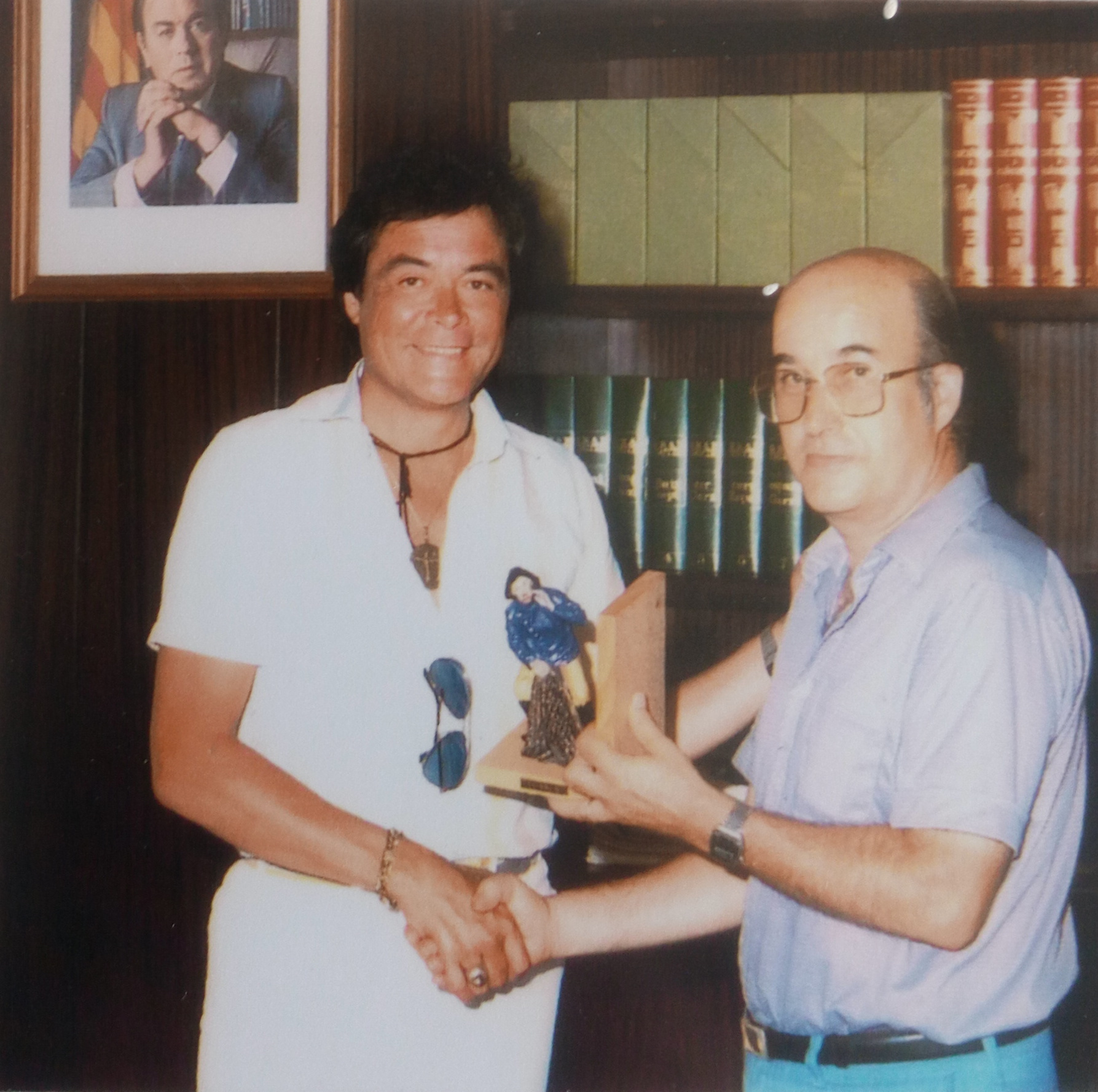
Jack Jersey and mayor of Llança

In May 1982, he had a hit with Puerto de Llansa (Lady Rose) in the Netherlands. Just a couple of months later he was appointed Honorary citizen for it by the Mayor of Llançà, a fishing village on the Costa Brava in Spain.

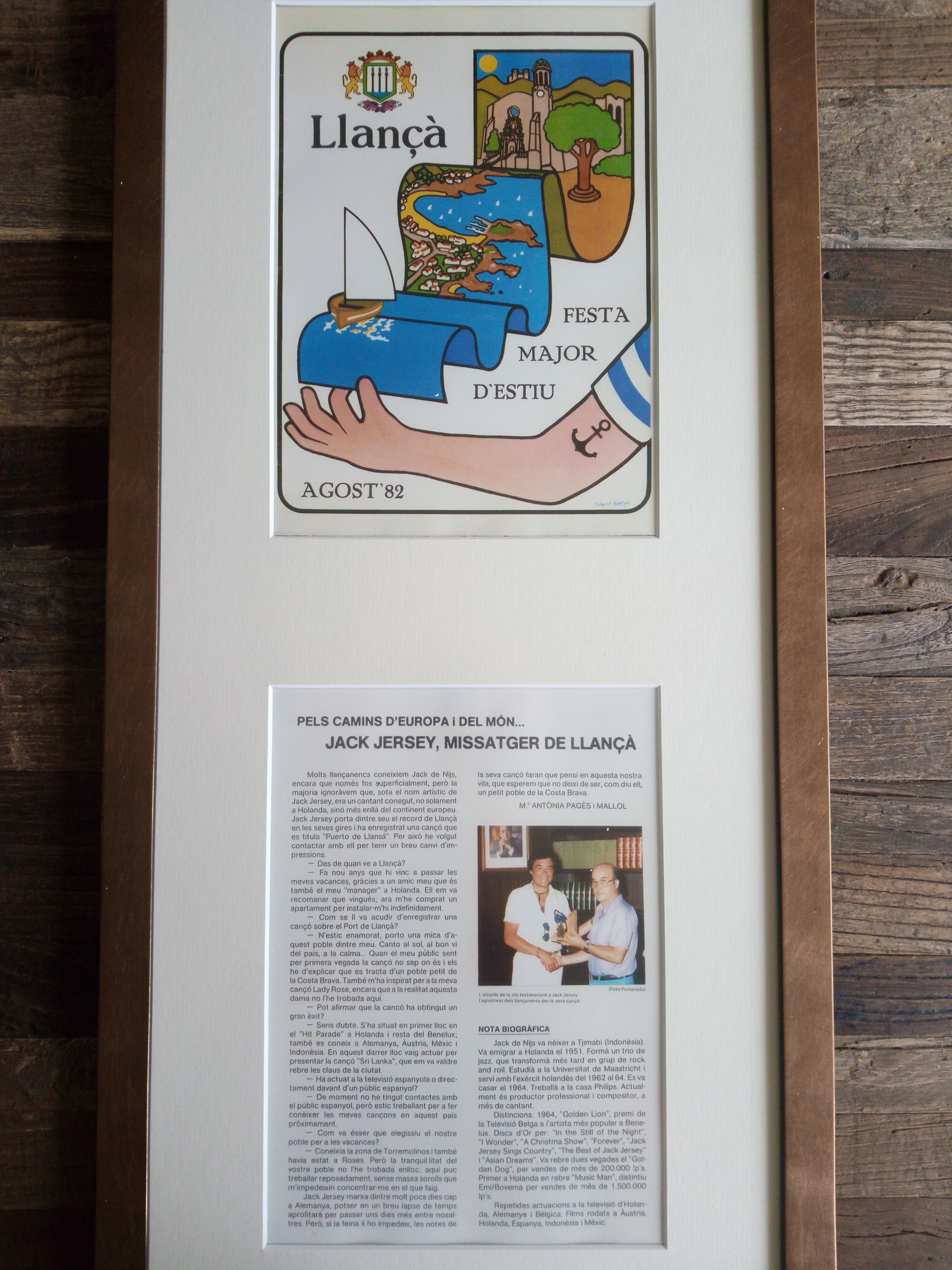
Jack Jersey, Missatger de Llança

=== Tour de France ===
1978: Certificate signed by Frie Thijs (secretary) and Rini Wagtmans (chairman) on behalf of the organizing committee, as a token of gratitude, because Jack Jersey's cooperation has made it possible to realize the Tour de France arrival in St. Willebrord. (The prologue in Leiden, the 1st stage part A from Leiden to St. Willebrord that was won on 30 June 1978 by Jan Raas.)

=== Illness ===
In 1985, and again in 1986, polyps were observed on his vocal folds. A couple of years later, in 1988, he was diagnosed with a malignant tumor in his pharynx and larynx.

He underwent surgery and radiation treatments several times. After these heavy treatments, he lived on a daily regimen of significant medication, including analgesics, but he never recovered completely. Nine years later, on 26 May 1997, he died of the complications of his disease in the arms of his wife at 55 years old.

Although already severely ill, in February 1997 he agreed with Ton van Beusekom of EMI to release a double-cd, entitled Thanks For All The Years. He knew that this album would probably be his last. He chose songs about countries he had visited. He included the song My Father's House which he wrote especially about his parental home in which he was born, some songs as a tribute/an ode to Elvis Presley and further hits such as I'm Calling (1973), In The Still of the Night (1974), Gone Girl (1975), Papa Was A Poor Man (1974) and Sri Lanka ... my Shangri-La (1980).

After he died, his music was still recorded by various artists, such as Frans Bauer and Marianne Weber: Wat ik zou willen (What I would want) and René Schuurmans, but also internationally, by Frank Michael.

=== Posthumous (tribute) ===
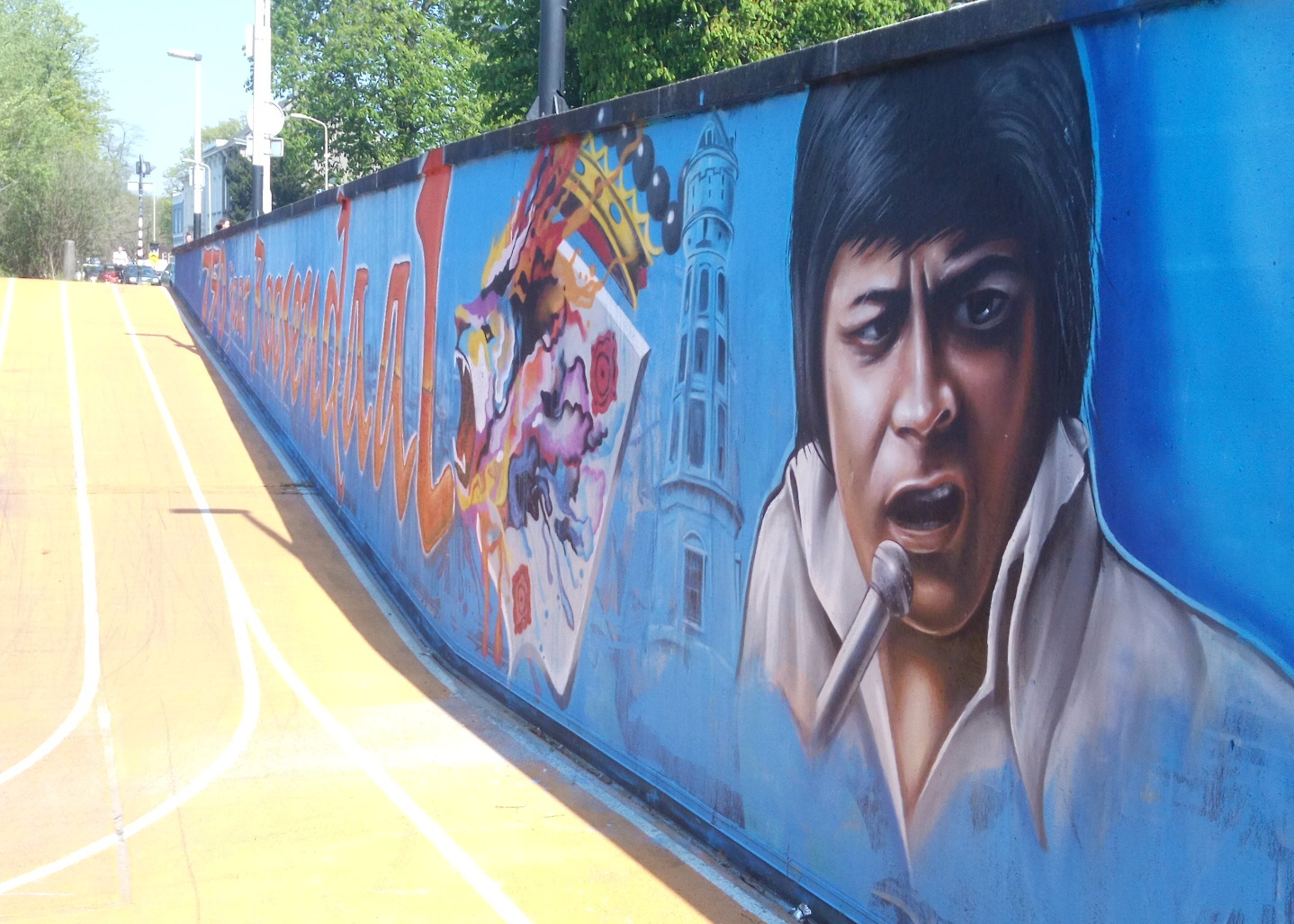
Graffiti painting in his former residence Roosendaal, 2018

In early 2007 EMI released his collection Asian Dreams and Greatest Hits. In addition to two CDs, it includes a DVD containing, among other things, the musical voyage report he made for the Dutch AVRO Television in 1977 by his native Indonesia directed by Theo Ordeman, a well-known Dutch television director. In addition, there are TV clips from historical television programs, such as from TopPop (The Netherlands) and Musikladen (Germany).

On 24 May 2009, a Jack Jersey Festival was held for the first time in the center of his hometown of Roosendaal, on the Oude Markt and in the Raatskelder. Various artists performed in his honor, including his discoveries Frank & Mirella and Nick MacKenzie. The Raatskelder has a historical connection with the singer-songwriter, because he had a music studio there in the attic in the sixties.

In May and August 2017, at the ceiling of the museum Tongerlohuys in his hometown, an exhibition was sent to numerous well-known Roosendaal icons, as well as to him. During this tribute, 26 May was also the day he died 20 years ago.

On 10 March 2018, on the occasion of the celebration of 750 years Roosendaal under the motto:The DNA of Roosendaal a portrait of Jack was also made by 15 professional graffiti-artists.

In 2020, his own song Una Noche Mexicana appeared in Soulmates (TV series) broadcast by AMC.

In 2023 appears the song Rub It In of Jack Jersey and The Jordanaires in Sex Education (TV series) season 4 (episode 5) which will be broadcast by Netflix.

== Music Awards ==
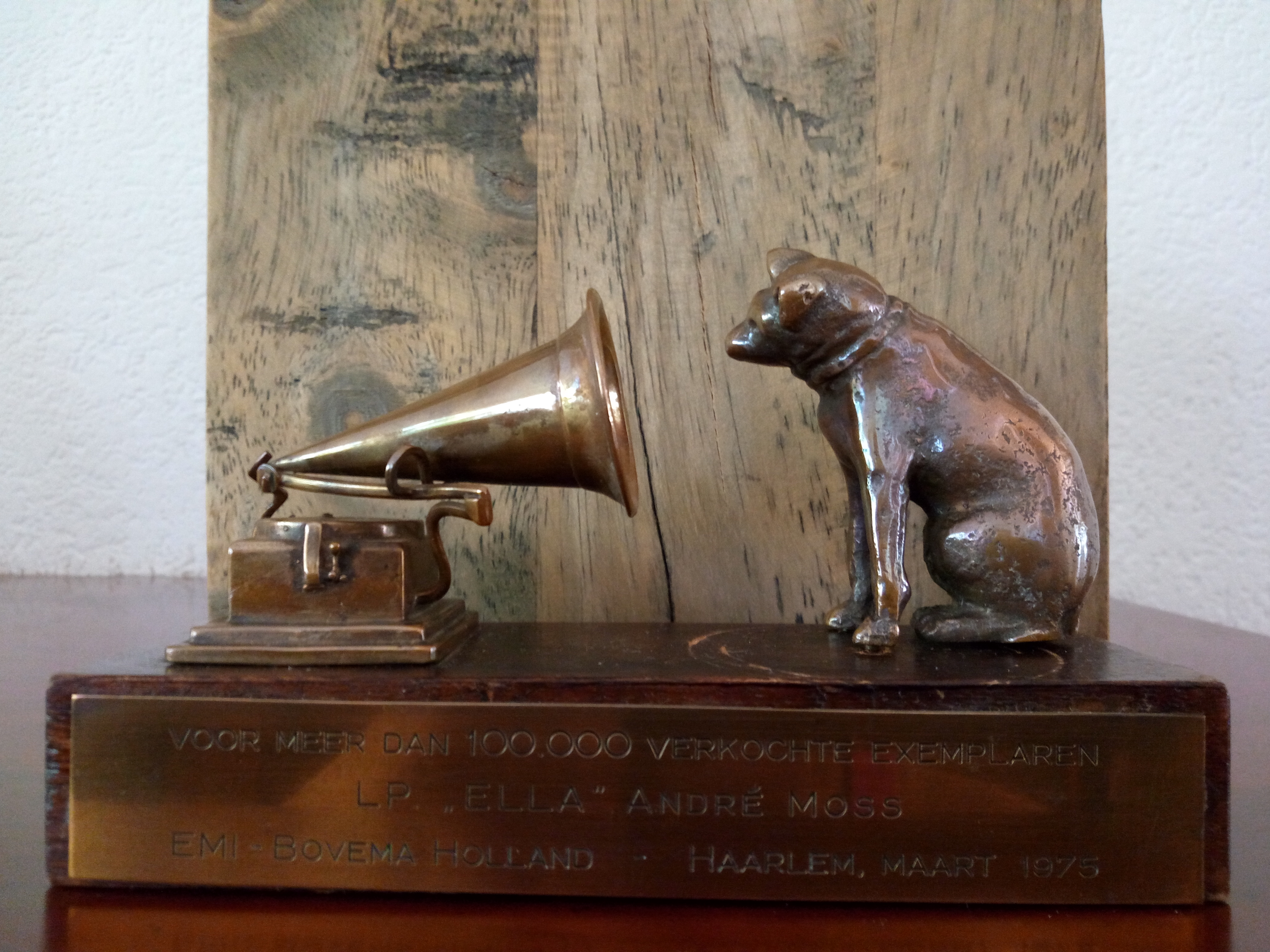
5 time His Master's Voice (Golden Dog)

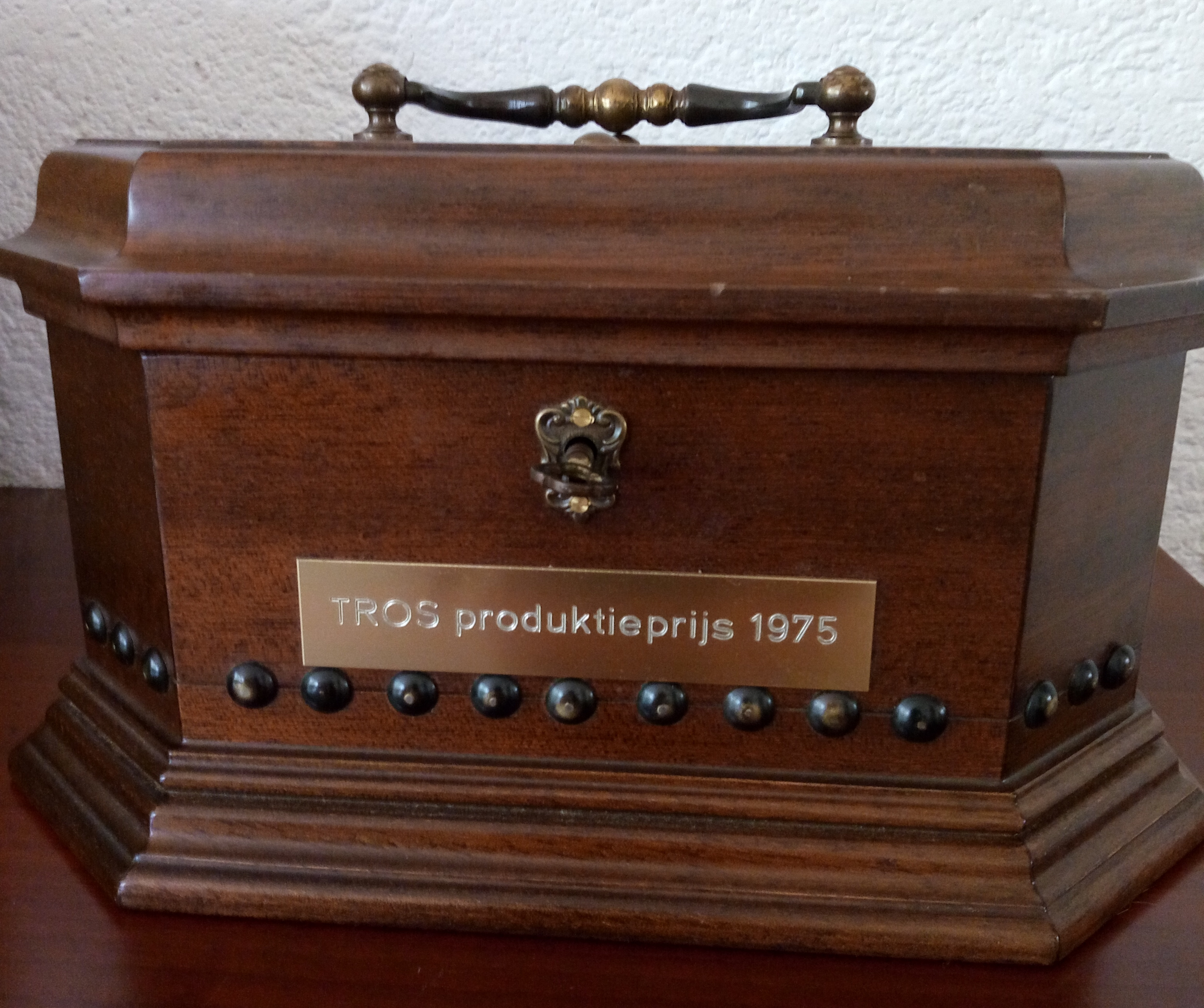
TROS Production Prize, 1975

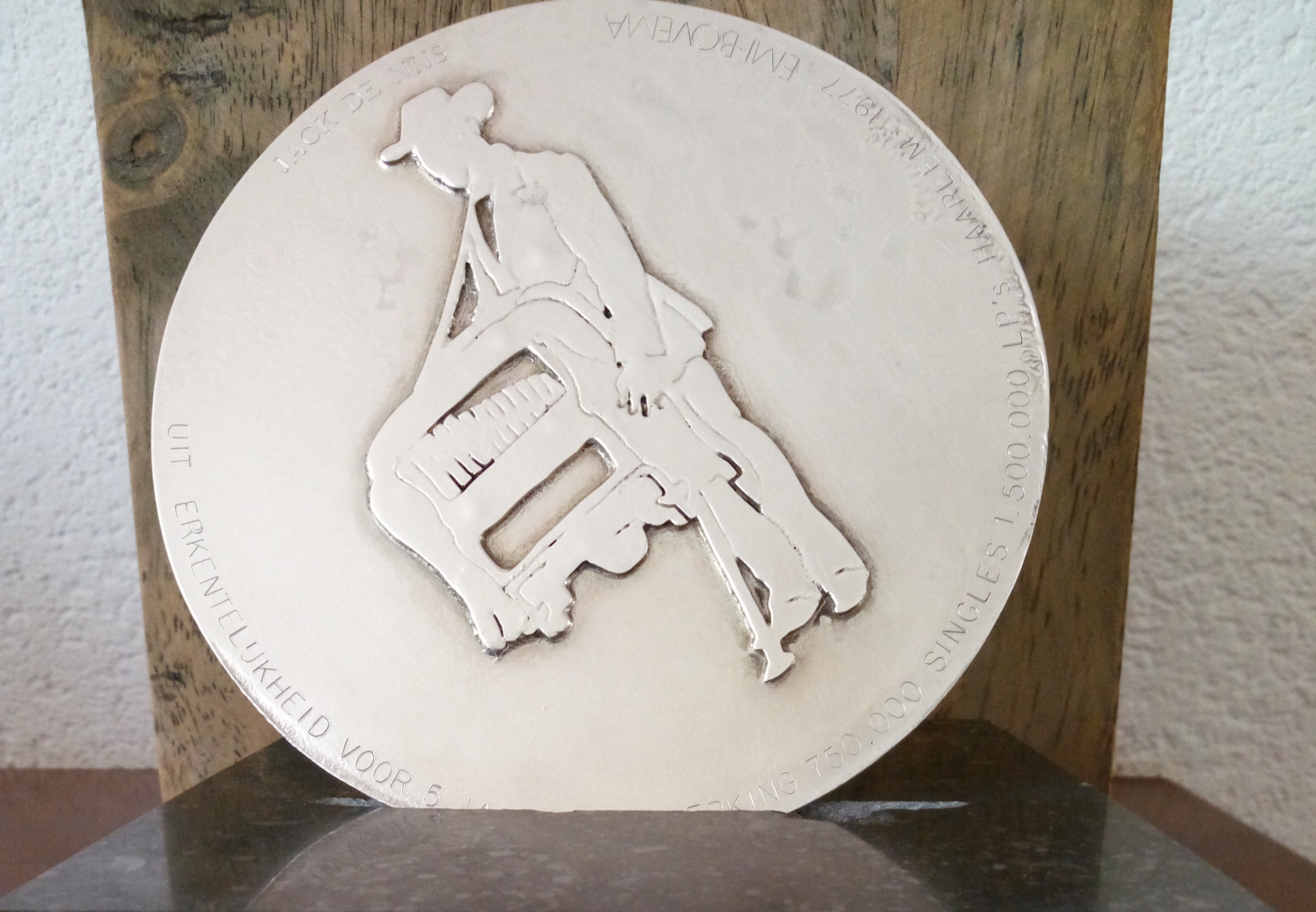
Silver plaque, Bovema, 1977

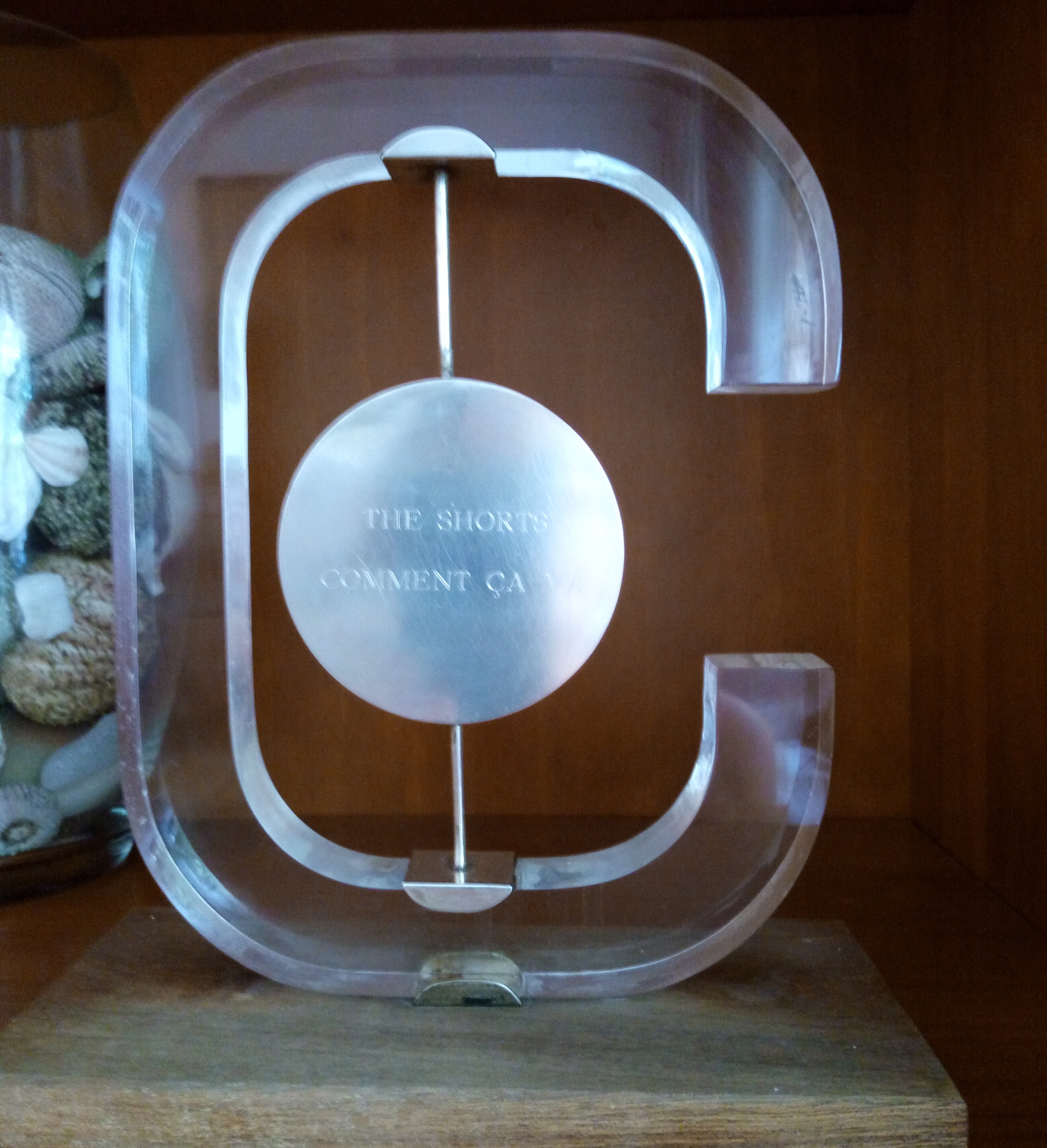
Export Prize, Buma Export Award 1983

Certifications as a singer and or songwriter and or music producer:

=== 1969 ===
- Gold for Oh Antoinette by Leo den Hop for more than 50.000 sold copies in The Netherlands.
- Platinum for Ray Miller in Germany with also the song Oh Antoinette for more than 600.000 sold copies.

=== 1970 ===
- Gold for the song Sophia Loren by Ray Miller in Germany for more than 300.000 sold copies.
- Platinum for the song Gina Lollobrigida by Tony Bass for more than 132.000 sold copies in The Netherlands.
- Platinum and Gold for the song Gina lollobrigida by Ray Miller for more than 900.000 sold copies in Germany.
- Gold for the song Zuster o zuster by Sjakie Schram for more than 46.000 sold copies in The Netherlands.
- Platinum for the song De Fles by Jan Boezeroen for more than 96.000 sold copies in The Netherlands.

=== 1971 ===
- Platinum for the song Mira by Cock van der Palm, for more than 75.000 sold copies.
- Platinum for the song Oei, oei by Jan Boezeroen, for more than 90.000 sold copies.

=== 1972 ===
- Gold ballpoint pen and Gold fillet pencil (brand: Cross).
- Awarded, rated for quality, artistic value and popularity within the Netherlands by Conamus (Buma Cultuur) *for the song Ze zeggen... by Jan Boezeroen, for more than 90.000 sales.

=== 1973 ===
- Platinum for the single One is One, EMI, by Nick MacKenzie for more than 300.000 sold copies.
- Gold for the single Juanita by Nick MacKenzie, EMI for more than 100.000 sold copies.
- Gold for the single Juanita by Nick MacKenzie, EMI in Germany for more than 300.000 sold copies.
- Platinum for Ella, André Moss, Bovema.

=== 1974 ===
- January
- The single Don't break this heart lands in both Dutch charts and that of Flanders, Belgium.
- February
- Gold for the single Peaches on a tree by Nick MacKenzie, EMI for more than 100.000 sold copies.
- Gold for the LP record Oei, Oei by Jan Boezeroen for more than 40.000 sold copies, Bovema.
- March
- Gold for the LP record Ella, by André Moss, Bovema.
- Gold for the LP record Rosita by André Moss, EMI
- Two times Gold for the LP records Op Losse Groeven, EMI each for more than 250.000 sold copies in The Netherlands.
- April
- Gold for the single In the Still of the Night, Jack Jersey, EMI Belgium for more than 100.000 sold copies.
- Golden Lion award from Belgian Television (BRT) given for the most popular recording artist in the Benelux.
- Gold for the single In the Still of the Night, Jack Jersey, EMI for more than 100.000 sold copies in The Netherlands.
- July
- Gold for the single Papa was a poor man, Jack Jersey, EMI
- August
- The album LP record In The Still of the Night of Jack Jersey begins a 19-week tour of the Dutch album chart.
- September
- Gold for the LP record In The Still of the Night, Jack Jersey, EMI/Bovema in the Netherlands.
- November
- The live-recorded single Rub it in by Jack Jersey and The Jordanaires, climbs the Dutch and Belgian charts and becomes a gold record.
- December
- 2nd time Gold for the LP record Rosita by André Moss, EMI for more than 50.000 sold copies in The Netherlands.

=== 1975 ===
- January
- Platinum for the LP record In The Still of the Night, Jack Jersey, EMI/Bovema for more than 100.000 sold copies.
- His Master's Voice Award for Jack Jersey, EMI.
- March
- "Golden Dog" alias His Master's Voice for more than 100.000 sold copies for the LP record Ella by André Moss, EMI. This song was also the Dutch television and radio TROS-tune.
- "Golden Dog" alias His Master's Voice In the Still of the Night by Jack Jersey, EMI, for more than 100.000 sold copies.
- 2nd time Platinum for the LP record Ella by André Moss, for more than 100.000 sold copies, EMI/Bovema.
- Platinum for the LP record Rosita by André Moss, EMI/Bovema.
- 3rd time Platinum for the LP record Ella by André Moss, for more than 100.000 sold copies, EMI/Bovema The Netherlands.
- May
- Gold music cassette Ella, André Moss, EMI/Bovema, for more than 100.000 sold copies.
- Gold Music Cassette in the Still of the Night, Jack Jersey, EMI, for more than 100.000 sold copies.
- June
- Bovema Director Roel R. Kruize handed Jack de Nijs the well-known porcelain Bovema gramophone with the logo His Master's Voice, which is only awarded by high exception.
- September
- Gold Dog Alias His Master's Voice for the LP record Rosita, André Moss, for over 100.000 sales, EMI / Bovema.

=== 1976 ===
- Jack de Nijs is named the most popular artist in the Netherlands, a shared first place with André van Duin.
- September
- Gold for the single Blue Brown Eyed Lady, Jack Jersey, EMI.

=== 1977 ===
- March
- Gold Music Cassette Rosita, André Moss, EMI.
- Gold Music Cassette My Spanish Rose, André Moss, EMI.
- Gold for the Gramophone record / LP record My Spanish Rose, André Moss, EMI / Bovema.
- Two times Gold for the LP record I wonder, Jack Jersey, EMI.
- Two times Gold Music Cassette I Wonder, Jack Jersey, EMI.
- Two times Gold for the LP record Sings country, Jack Jersey, EMI.
- Gold for the LP record Forever, Jack Jersey, EMI.
- Two times Gold for the LP record A Christmas show, Jack Jersey, EMI.
- November
- Two times Gold for the LP record Asian Dreams, Jack Jersey, EMI, for more than 100.000 sold copies.
- Also in 1977, In Haarlem, a special, unprecedented silver plaque on marble foot was awarded to Jack de Nijs by Bovema manager Kees den Daas, which he appreciates the "artistic and productive gifts" of De Nijs, whose work at EMI is more than three-quarters Million singles and 1 1/2 million LP records Gramophone record were sold.
- This special music prize has never been awarded before.

=== 1978 ===
- Gold for the LP record Viva Mexico, EMI.

=== 1980 ===
- Platinum for the single Sri Lanka...My Shangri-La, Jack Jersey, on record label Goena Goena Records, for more than 300.000 sold copies.
- An NVPI certificate – IFPI – awarded to Jack Jersey.

=== 1981 ===
- Platinum for the LP record The Best of Jack Jersey, EMI for more than 100.000 sold copies.

=== 1983 ===
- Gold for the single Comment ça va of The Shorts for more than 100.000 sold copies.
- Platinum for the single Comment ça va of The Shorts for more than 200.000 sold copies. The single stands for five weeks at the top in the National Hit parade of The Netherlands. It is the best-selling single in the Netherlands of this year.
- Platinum for the single Comment ça va of The Shorts for more than 1.000.000 (1 million) sold singles/copies in France. EMI.
- Receives in the same year for this international number 1-hit Comment ça va of The Shorts, EMI, the Export price, Buma Export Award of the Buma Culture Foundation, Buma Cultuur, formerly CONAMUS Foundation.
- Also the successor Je suis, tu es by The Shorts becomes Platinum, for more than 100.000 sales. It will be a number 3 hit.

=== 1989 ===
- Gold for the LP record Close To You, Jack Jersey, Dino Music, with at least 78.051 sold copies in Poland.

== Discography ==
=== Albums ===
The Album Top was compiled by Radio Veronica (organizer of the Dutch Top 40) and followed up by the Album Top 100 (organizer of the National Hitparade / Single Top 100). These two are in this following order combined in the next list.

Year	album	Top 100	comments
1970	Jack de Nijs zingt Sofia Loren	–	
1974	In The Still of the Night	3 (29 weeks)	Platinum
1975	Honky Tonk Man	–	American edition with The Jordanaires, live-album
1975	I Wonder	7 (13 weeks)	European edition with The Jordanaires, live album, double gold
1975	Christmas Show	31 (3 weeks)	TV-special (filmed in Austria), broadcasting by Dutch television, double gold
1976	Jack Jersey Sings Country	15 (12 weeks)	TV-special (filmed in Belgium and The Netherlands), broadcasting by Dutch television, double gold
1976	The Best Of Jack Jersey	2 (19 weeks)	TV clips of six songs from this album were filmed in Spain, broadcasting by Dutch television. Platinum
1977	Forever	22 (10 weeks)	TV clips of three songs from this album were filmed in Spain, broadcasting by Dutch television.
1977	Asian Dreams	5 (20 weeks)	TV-special (filmed in Indonesia), broadcasting by Dutch television. Double gold
1978	Mexico	17 (10 weeks)	TV-special (filmed in Mexico), broadcasting by Dutch television. Gold.
1979	The King And I	25 (12 weeks)	TV-special (filmed in Tunisia and Amsterdam), broadcasting by Dutch television. Released after official permission
1979	Accept My Love	37 (2 weeks)	
1980	Sri Lanka My Shangri-La	38 (8 weeks)	Platinum
1981	Jack Jersey Show	28 (8 weeks)	TV-special (filmed in Sri Lanka), broadcasting by Dutch television. (Jack Jersey with Lisa MacKeag and Maurice de la Croix)
1982	Dreamer	28 (9 weeks)	
1988	Close To You	39 (8 weeks)	Gold
1997	Thanks For All The Years	–	2 CD's
2007	Asian Dreams And Greatest Hits	51 (5 weeks)	DVD and 1 CD, Released by record company EMI Netherlands as a posthumous tribute to Jack. Gold.

=== Singles ===
Here follows a compilation of singles of Jack Jersey. At the beginning he released records under his own name Jack de Nijs and the alias Ruby Nash. "Hitparade" in the list refers to the National Hitparade, although this name has changed several times in history. Former names were Hilversum 3 Top 30 (1969–71), Daverende Dertig (1971–74), Nationale Hitparade (1974–89) and National Top 100 (1989–93). In 1987 the National Hitparade evolved from a top 50 to a top 100.

Year	Single	Top 40	Hitparade	BRT 30	opmerkingen
1970	Sofia Loren	23 (3 weeks)	21 (2 weeks)	–	as Jack de Nijs
1970	Al Ben Ik Mister Mundy Niet	tip	–	–	as Jack de Nijs
1971	Oh Daar Heb Je Ze Weer	36 (4 weeks)	–	–	as Jack de Nijs
1971	Blame It on the Summersun	35 (2 weeks)	–	–	as Ruby Nash
1972	Ay, Ay, Waar Blijft Maria	25 (4 weeks)	28 (1 week)	–	as Jack de Nijs
1972	Helena	28 (3 weeks)	–	–	as Jack de Nijs
1972	Marian	tip	–	–	as Jack de Nijs Sextet
1973	Hee Dans Met Mij	tip	–	–	as Jack de Nijs Sextet
1973	I'm Calling	13 (7 weeks)	12 (5 weeks)	10 (10 weeks)	
1973	Don't Break This Heart	17 (6 weeks)	18 (4 weeks)	4 (6 weeks)	
1974	In The Still of the Night	6 (11 weeks)	5 (11 weeks)	2 (15 weeks)	(Germany) 21 (6 weeks) number 726 in the Evergreen Top 1000 (2017)of NPO Radio 5
1974	Papa Was A Poor Man	5 (11 weeks)	5 (13 weeks)	3 (12 weeks)	
1974	Rub-It In	14 (6 weeks)	13 (5 weeks)	8 (6 weeks)	with The Jordanaires
1975	I Wonder	11 (7 weeks)	11 (5 weeks)	6 (11 weeks)	with The Jordanaires
1975	Mary Lee	38 (3 weeks)	28 (2 weeks)	18 (4 weeks)	with The Jordanaires
1975	Silvery Moon	22 (3 weeks)	22 (4 weeks)	16 (5 weeks)	
1975	Gone Girl	11 (7 weeks)	12 (5 weeks)	7 (8 weeks)	
1976	Me and Bobby McGee	22 (5 weeks)	17 (4 weeks)	16 (5 weeks)	
1976	(After Sweet Memories) Play Born to Lose Again	17 (7 weeks)	16 (4 weeks)	16 (3 weeks)	
1976	Blue Brown-Eyed Lady	6 (11 weeks)	6 (8 weeks)	4 (11 weeks)	
1976	Lonely Christmas	–	–	18 (3 weeks)	
1977	Lonely Me	21 (6 weeks)	24 (3 weeks)	22 (4 weeks)	
1977	On This Night A Thousand Stars	tip	tip	25 (3 weeks)	
1977	Forever	tip	tip	–	
1977	She Was Dynamite	18 (6 weeks)	22 (4 weeks)	11 (7 weeks)	
1977	Asian Dreams	–	–	29 (1 week)	
1980	Sri Lanka... My Shangri-La	4 (10 weeks)	3 (12 weeks)	2 (11 weeks)	(Germany) 34 (5 weeks) (Austria) 6 (12 weeks) (Switzerland) 8 (6 weeks)
1980	Woman	28 (4 weeks)	39 (4 weeks)	21 (1 week)	
1981	Shanah	26 (5 weeks)	27 (7 weeks)	–	
1981	Lonely Street	tip	–	–	
1982	Puerto de Llansa (Lady Rose)	26 (5 weeks)	35 (5 weeks)	–	
1982	Papa Was A Poor Man (live)	tip	–	–	live in Indonesië
1985	All I Do Is Dream	tip	tip	–	
1988	Lady	tip	59 (9 weeks)	–	
1988	Happy Xmas (War Is Over) / Gelukkig Kerstfeest	15 (5 weeks)	–	–	Artists for the Ronald McDonald House
1989	Hurry Home	tip	76 (6 weeks)	–	
1990	Here Comes Summer	tip	63 (7 weeks)	–	
1991	Blame It on the Summersun / Op Dat Eiland in De Zon	tip	65 (5 weeks)	–	

== Gallery ==
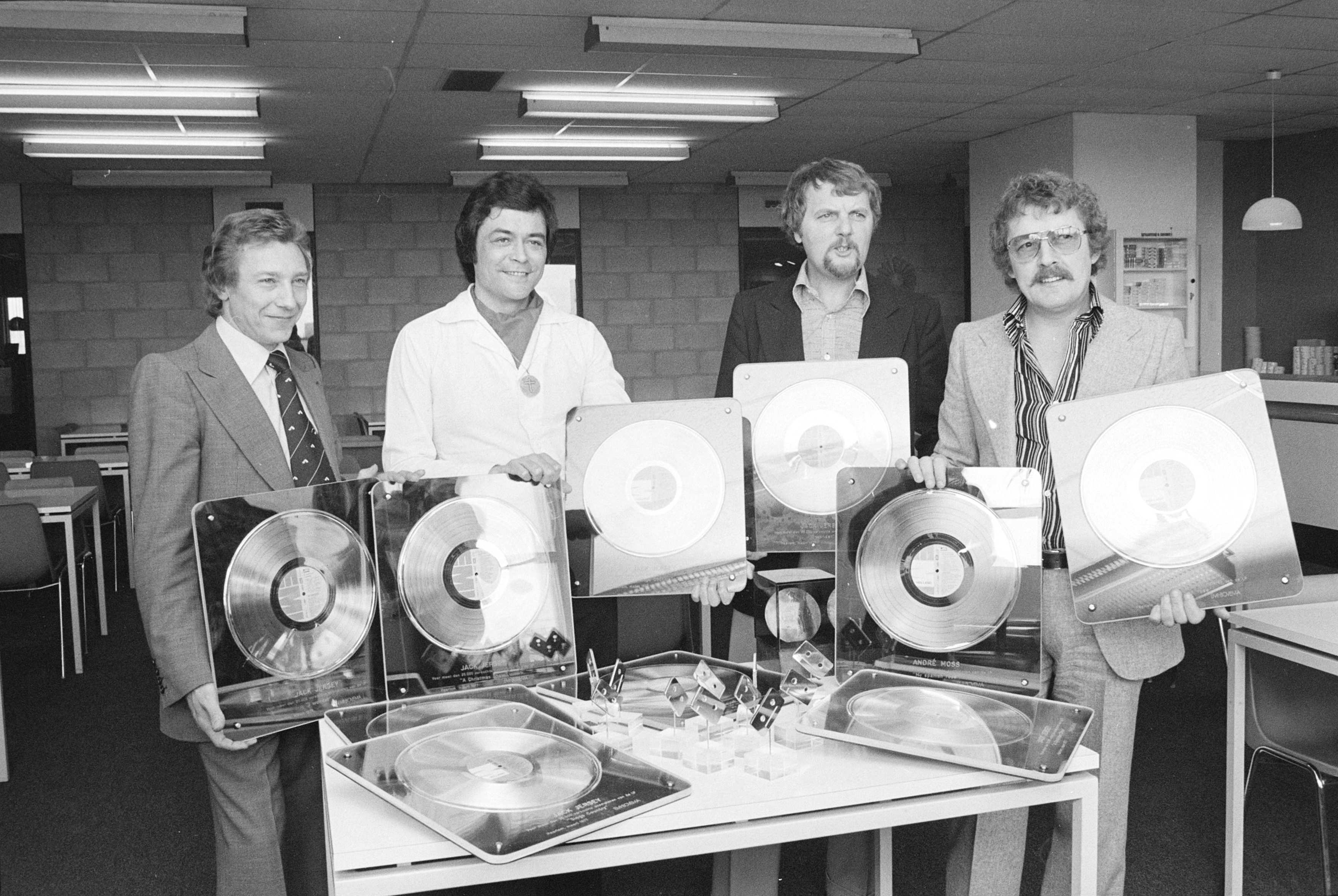
Unknown person, Jack de Nijs, Cees den Daas and André Moss

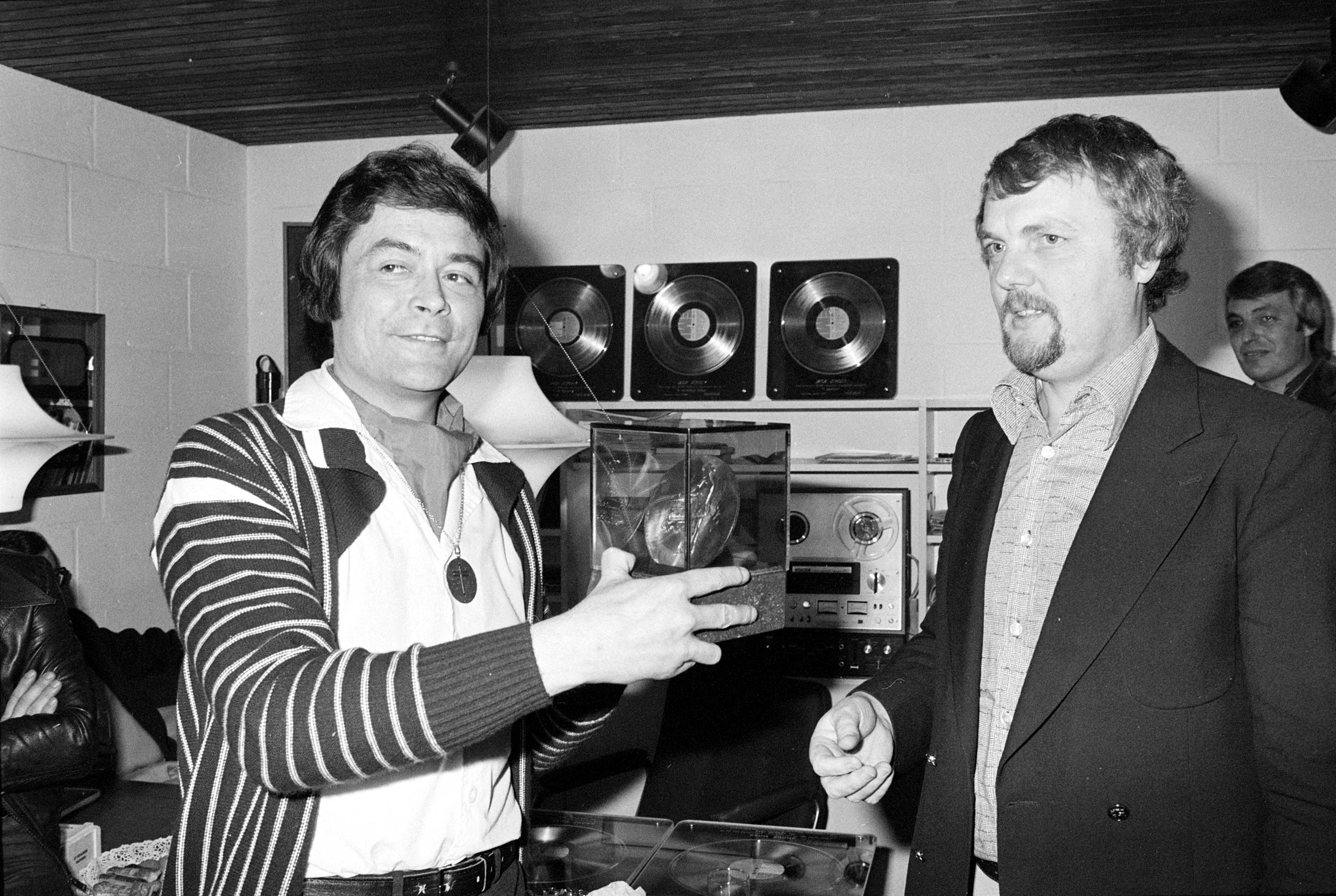
Jack de Nijs and Cees den Daas

== See also ==
- List of musicians signed to EMI
