= K. B. Menon =

Indian politician and revolutionary (1897–1967)

Member of Parliament for Vadakara
- In office 1957–1962
- Preceded by: Position Created
- Succeeded by: A.V. Raghavan

Member of Madras State Legislative Assembly for Thrithala
- In office 1952–1956
- Preceded by: Position Created
- Succeeded by: Constituency Abolished

Personal details
- Born: Konnanath Balakrishna Menon; 18 June 1897 Thaliparamba, Malabar district, Madras Presidency, British India (now in Kerala, India)
- Died: 6 September 1967 (aged 70) Kozhikode, Kerala, India
- Party: Samyukta Socialist Party; Praja Socialist Party; Socialist Party (India); Indian National Congress
- Relations: V.K. Krishna Menon K. Sankara Menon K. Kunhirama Menon Dewan Raman Menon K.R.K. Menon Bhaskar Menon
- Parent: Vengalil Raman Memon Konnanath Lakshmi Amma
- Education: University of California, Berkeley, University of Colorado

Konnanath Balakrishna Menon (18 June 1897 – 6 September 1967) was an Indian academic, politician and revolutionary activist from Kerala. He was a professor at Harvard University and part of the revolutionary Ghadar Movement before returning to Kerala at the behest of Jayaprakash Narayan to champion Indian independence there in 1936. A protégé of both Mahatma Gandhi and Jawaharlal Nehru, he nonetheless eschewed nonviolence, as the mastermind behind and leader of the 27-man team behind the 1942 Keezhariyur bombings. He is remembered as the architect and father of the Quit India Movement in Kerala.

After independence, he declined a position in Nehru's Indian Congress party government, instead representing Thrithala in the Madras State Legislative Assembly from 1952 to 1956, and then Vadakara as its inaugural Member of Parliament in the Lok Sabha between 1957 and 1962. In 1965 he was elected to the Kerala Legislative Assembly as member for Quilandy.

== Early life ==
He was born in 1897 into the aristocratic landowning Konnanath tharavadu, as the son of Vengalil Raman Menon, a munsiff magistrate in Calicut, and son of the former Dewan and Dalawa of Travancore, Palakkal Raman Menon. Minister of Defence and de facto Foreign minister of India V. K. Krishna Menon, Kalakshetra boss K. Sankara Menon, leading trial lawyer K. Kunhirama Menon (who would represent him in the Keezhariyur bomb case), Finance Secretary K.R.K. Menon, and Indian-American record executive Bhaskar Menon were first cousins or first cousins once removed of his, while his uncle K. Kunjan Menon was a subordinate judge.

Menon graduated from Madras University in 1920 and was appointed at Nizam college, Hyderabad. Soon, he resigned the post in order to a pursue graduate degrees, including a Ph.D. in Economics, at the University of California, Berkeley. After earning a graduate degree from Berkeley in 1923 for a thesis entitled The cooperative movement and economic welfare, Menon went on to receive a doctorate in economics and sociology from the University of Colorado at Boulder in 1932, with his dissertation entitled Postwar Progress of the Cooperative Movement in the United States and USSR: A Comparative Study. He joined Harvard as professor, where he met Jayaprakash Narayan who was sent to the US for higher studies; that friendship guided Menon into a new way.

== Independence movement ==
Menon resigned from Harvard and returned to India in 1936. He assumed the office of general secretary of the All India Civil Liberties Union founded by Jawaharlal Nehru aimed at aiding people suffering from torture for participation in National movement, and of general secretary of the Citizens' Forum of the Princely States. Menon became a resident of Gandhi ashram when the office of citizens' forum of the princely states was changed to Wardha in 1941 and secured friendship with Mahatma Gandhi.

Keezhariyur Bomb Case

Menon returned to Kerala as part of Quit India Movement, this arrival intensified strength of the movement in Malabar dist. and Cochin. He was main man behind the famous Keezhariyur bomb conspiracy case which attracted media attention from the whole country, with Mathai Manjooran as his second-in-command. He was the first accused and sentenced to ten year rigorous imprisonment. He was released after five years following independence, however those days in jail rotted his health.

== After independence ==
Menon was a strict follower and proponent of Gandhism as well as socialism. He left Congress as socialists departed. Nehru, a close friend and admirer of his wanted Menon by his side, but Menon asked to join the socialists instead. He was elected to Madras Legislative Assembly in 1952 from Thrithala constituency as a socialist candidate. He represented Badagara in the Loksabha following the second general election. Once again he shone in electoral politics as he was elected from Quilandy constituency in 1965, since none of the parties gained majority the assembly was dissolved. There was a move in background for creating government under Menon but he became a victim of backstage betrayals. He returned to Congress in his last days.

== Death ==
Menon died on 6 September 1967 at Kozhikode Medical College. He was cremated in the compound of Thrithala High School where he used to reside during his last days, the school was established as a result of his serious interventions.

== Eponyms ==
- Dr. K. B. Menon Memorial Higher Secondary School
- Villappally Panchayat PHC

== See also ==
- Mathai Manjooran
- K. Kelappan
- V. K. Krishna Menon
- K. C. S. Mani
- K. M. Panicker
