= List of Dutch Top 40 number-one singles of 1983 =

These hits topped the Dutch Top 40 in 1983.

Issue Date	Song	Artist(s)	Reference
1 January	No Top 40 released		
8 January	"You Can't Hurry Love"	Phil Collins	
15 January	"You Can't Hurry Love"	Phil Collins	
22 January	"Save Your Love"	Renée and Renato	
29 January	"Goodnight Saigon"	Billy Joel	
5 February	"Goodnight Saigon"	Billy Joel	
12 February	"Goodnight Saigon"	Billy Joel	
19 February	"Fame"	Irene Cara	
26 February	"Fame"	Irene Cara	
5 March	"Fame"	Irene Cara	
12 March	"Pa"	Doe Maar	
19 March	"Pa"	Doe Maar	
26 March	"99 Luftballons"	Nena	
2 April	"99 Luftballons"	Nena	
9 April	"99 Luftballons"	Nena	
16 April	"99 Luftballons"	Nena	
23 April	"Let's Dance"	David Bowie	
30 April	"Let's Dance"	David Bowie	
7 May	"Beat It"	Michael Jackson	
14 May	"Beat It"	Michael Jackson	
21 May	"Beat It"	Michael Jackson	
28 May	"Beat It"	Michael Jackson	
4 June	"Comment ça va"	The Shorts	
11 June	"Comment ça va"	The Shorts	
18 June	"Comment ça va"	The Shorts	
25 June	"Stars on 45 Proudly Presents The Star Sisters"	The Star Sisters	
2 July	"Stars on 45 Proudly Presents The Star Sisters"	The Star Sisters	
9 July	"Stars on 45 Proudly Presents The Star Sisters"	The Star Sisters	
16 July	"Stars on 45 Proudly Presents The Star Sisters"	The Star Sisters	
23 July	"Stars on 45 Proudly Presents The Star Sisters"	The Star Sisters	
30 July	"Wanna Be Startin' Somethin'"	Michael Jackson	
6 August	"Wanna Be Startin' Somethin'"	Michael Jackson	
13 August	"Rondo Russo"	Berdien Stenberg	
20 August	"Rondo Russo"	Berdien Stenberg	
27 August	"Rondo Russo"	Berdien Stenberg	
3 September	"Dolce Vita"	Ryan Paris	
10 September	"Dolce Vita"	Ryan Paris	
17 September	"Codo (...Düse Im Sauseschritt)"	DÖF	
24 September	"Codo (...Düse Im Sauseschritt)"	DÖF	
1 October	"Red Red Wine"	UB40	
8 October	"Red Red Wine"	UB40	
15 October	"Red Red Wine"	UB40	
22 October	"Karma Chameleon"	Culture Club	
29 October	"All Night Long (All Night)"	Lionel Richie	
5 November	"All Night Long (All Night)"	Lionel Richie	
12 November	"All Night Long (All Night)"	Lionel Richie	
19 November	"All Night Long (All Night)"	Lionel Richie	
26 November	"(Hey You) The Rock Steady Crew"	The Rock Steady Crew	
3 December	"(Hey You) The Rock Steady Crew"	The Rock Steady Crew	
10 December	"(Hey You) The Rock Steady Crew"	The Rock Steady Crew	
17 December	"(Hey You) The Rock Steady Crew"	The Rock Steady Crew	
24 December	"You Are"	Dolly Parton	
31 December	No Top 40 released		

== See also ==
- 1983 in music
