= KRK Menon =

First Finance Secretary of independent India

Konnanath Ramakrishna Menon MBE CIE, known widely as K.R.K. Menon, was the first Finance Secretary of India, charged with oversight of Indian Revenue. He further held the offices of Chairman of the Central Board of Revenue, Chairman of the Industrial Finance Corporation of India (IFCI), and Chairman of the Kerala State Industrial Development Corporation, and served as a member of the Planning Commission (India), Administrative Reforms Commission, and as a Governor on the Board of the Indian Institutes of Technology (IIT).

During the British Raj he was created a Member of the British Empire in 1938 and a Companion of the Order of the Indian Empire in 1946.

He was cousin to both, Konnanath Balakrishna Menon, and Konnanath Padmanabha Menon and father to Bhaskar Menon.
