= Bhaskar Menon =

Indian-American music executive (1934–2021)

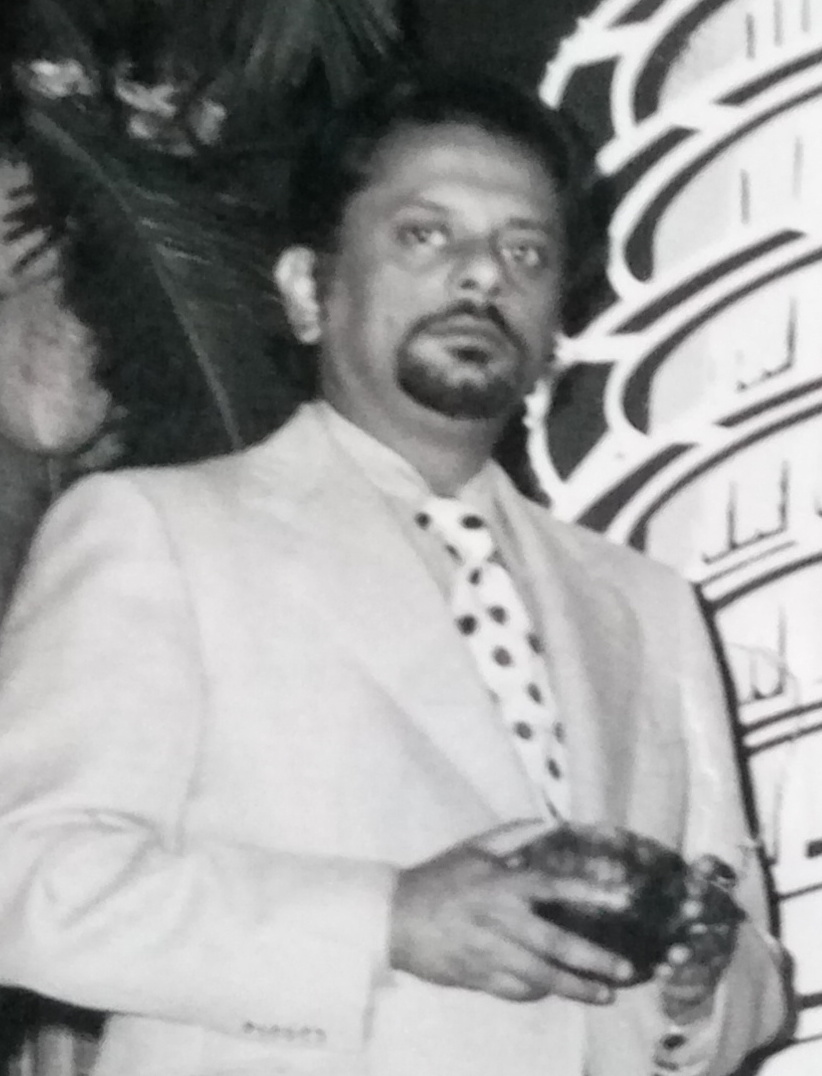
- Menon in 1974

Background information
- Born: Vijaya Bhaskar Menon; 29 May 1934; Trivandrum, Kingdom of Travancore, British India (present day Thiruvananthapuram, Kerala, India)
- Died: 4 March 2021 (aged 86) Beverly Hills, California, United States
- Occupations: Record label executive, broadcast media executive
- Years active: 1956–1990 (music), 1990–2021 (media)
- Labels: Capitol, EMI

Bhaskar Menon (29 May 1934 – 4 March 2021) was a music industry executive of Indian origin. He hailed from Palakkad, Kerala, India. He initially worked with The Gramophone Company of India Ltd. (Saregama His Master's Voice) Dum Dum, Calcutta, India as the chairman and MD. From there he was taken to the United Kingdom by EMI.

As the first chairman and CEO of EMI Music Worldwide, Bhaskar Menon was best known as a music industry executive, overseeing the EMI Group’s worldwide operations and subsidiaries.

== Overview ==
A citizen of the United States, Menon was born in India where he was educated at The Doon School and received a B.A. Honours degree from the University of Delhi. He earned a master's degree from Christ Church, Oxford University, and joined EMI Limited in London. Transferred to India and the Far East, he was appointed chairman, managing director and chief executive of EMI's Indian subsidiary.

Menon returned to London as divisional director and general manager (overseas) of EMI Limited responsible for the group's interests and investments outside the UK. He was concurrently appointed managing director of EMI International Services Limited with direct operating responsibility for companies in 25 countries. He represented EMI on the boards of several subsidiary and associated companies, including Capitol Industries in the US and Toshiba EMI Limited in Japan.

Menon transferred to Los Angeles and was elected president and chief executive officer of Capitol Industries Inc., a public corporation in which EMI held majority interest. He was appointed a director of the parent board of EMI Limited, and elected chairman of the board of Capitol Industries Inc. in addition to remaining president and chief executive officer of all its operating companies in North America, including Capitol Records, the Merco & MusicDen Retail Group, Capitol Magnetic Products division, and of the Screen Gems and Colgems music publishing companies and United Artists Records, which he acquired for Capitol/EMI. He was also chairman of EMI Films Inc. and EMI Television Programs Inc.

Menon turned around the financially troubled Capitol EMI into a successful major player in the music industry. In a 1978 article, the publication New Musical Express noted, "Within a year he had turned Capitol's $15 million loss into a profit. His motto for his employees was simple: 'Uncompromising excellence in what you do goes without saying. We expect more than that.

A recent posting on the FYI music site had this to say about Menon's achievements at EMI.

"Menon pulled the British companies sprawling assets, spread over 46 countries, under one roof and created EMI Music Worldwide in 1978. Menon was a great team builder, he had a passion for music and he loved entertaining and hanging out with musicians. Just like the incredible team that built Warner, Elektra and Atlantic. From what I remember of Bhaskar Menon, his kindness, generosity and sharp intellect were appreciated by the stable of talent the company acquired and held on to in those years."

== Early life ==
Menon was born on 29 May 1934 in Trivandrum, in modern day state of Kerala in India, to Saraswathi and KRK Menon. His father, KRK Menon was a civil servant, who was independent India's first finance secretary. He was exposed to music with the Indian classical music that he was exposed to from his mother's side. He studied at The Doon School and earned his Master's degree in 1956 from Christ Church, Oxford. He married his wife Sumitra (daughter of famous painter K.C.S. Paniker) in 1972.

== Career highlights ==
Menon started his career with the British music record and publishing company, EMI, in 1956 after graduating from university. He moved over to EMI's Indian subsidiary Gramophone Company of India in 1957 and went on to become its chairman in 1969. He would work with the group for 34 years in various positions.

As its first chairman and CEO, Menon formed EMI Music Worldwide in 1978, which brought together under his unified global management all of EMI Group's records and music publishing interests throughout the world. Among the world's foremost companies in the entertainment business, the multibillion-dollar EMI Music Group headquartered in London has operations in over 46 countries.

When Thorn Electrical Industries and EMI joined to form Thorn EMI, one of the world's largest companies in their respective businesses, Menon was appointed director of the parent Board of the merged company at its inception in December 1979. He remained chairman of EMI Music Worldwide and a director of the Thorn EMI plc Board until he retired from the Group in 1990.

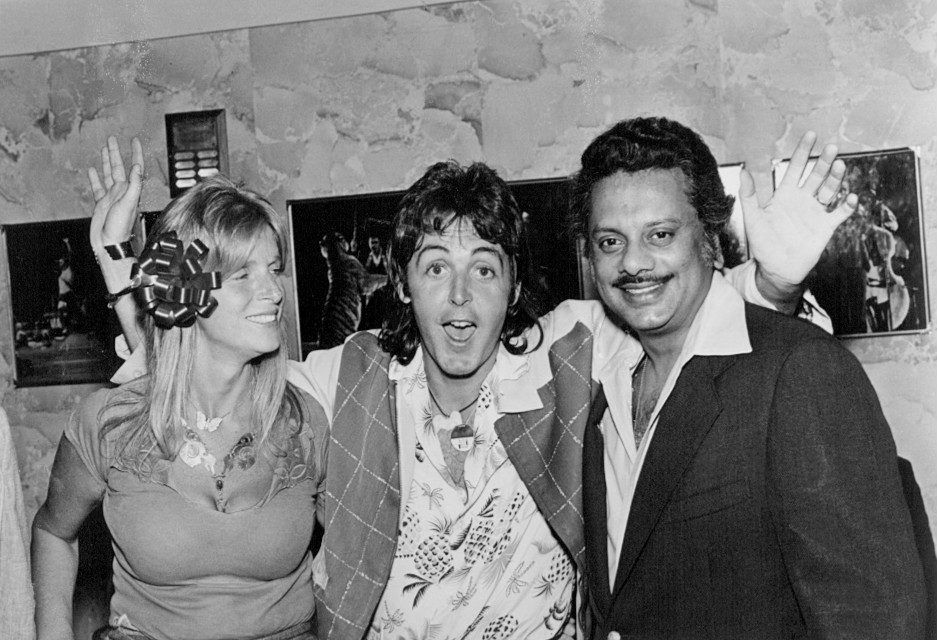
Menon (right) with Paul (centre) and Linda McCartney in 1976

During his many years in the international music business, Menon was closely associated with the careers of a number of outstanding popular artists such as the Beatles, the Rolling Stones, Pink Floyd, Queen, Jack Jersey, Glen Campbell, Kenny Rogers, Tina Turner, Anne Murray, Peggy Lee, Paul McCartney & Wings, Duran Duran, Nancy Wilson, Iron Maiden, Diana Ross, Bob Seger, Carole King, and Steve Miller. He also worked with classical performers like Yehudi Menuhin, Herbert von Karajan, Maria Callas, Ricardo Muti, Itzhak Perlman, and Daniel Barenboim. In his recent memoirs, Duran Duran's Andy Taylor noted, "We decided to go with EMI, because we knew they had a global network and could launch bands across America. The company was headed by the legendary music industry figure, Bhaskar Menon, who'd presided over EMI during the rise of the Beatles." (Andy Taylor, quoted in Wild Boy: My Life in Duran Duran)

As chairman of EMI India, Menon was involved in the careers of that country's leading film, popular and classical singers and musicians. During his chairmanship of EMI Films Inc, the company produced such masterpieces as the multi-Oscar-winning Deer Hunter, Murder on the Orient Express, and A Passage to India (film).

== Dark Side of the Moon ==
In 1973, Menon played the central role in leading the promotion and marketing of Pink Floyd's album The Dark Side of the Moon. He put the power of Capitol/EMI behind the band with a tremendous marketing, PR and advertising effort led by Capitol's vice president Al Coury. The album which has been called "the most technically advanced recording of its time" was hailed as a unique blend of studio wizardry and outstanding musical innovation. As such it might have achieved some success without Menon's support, but Pink Floyd's sales in the US had been modest up to that point, and the promotion efforts of Al Coury certainly encouraged success internationally. In the UK, Pink Floyd had blocked the release of singles. Menon pushed for the songs, "Us and Them" and "Time" to be edited and released as singles for American radio. The Dark Side of the Moon spent 950 weeks on the USA-based Billboard 200 album chart, the longest duration of any album in history. It is also the fourth highest selling album globally of all time, selling more than forty million units. Menon was featured in the documentary The Making of The Dark Side of the Moon.

Menon’s contributions to the Dark Side of the Moon album’s success were recognized and when asked in an interview whether he was surprised at the results of his efforts he was quoted as saying, "I always believed that the record would be very, very successful. It was gratifying, but not surprising."

== Concert for Bangladesh ==
In 1971, Menon and Capitol joined with ex-Beatle George Harrison and Apple in releasing the live recording of the Madison Square Garden "Concert for Bangladesh" which was inspired by Harrison and his friend Ravi Shankar. Besides George Harrison, Ringo Starr and Bob Dylan, the concert and the recording featured a bevy of some of the most important musical artists in the Western world. Most of these artists had exclusive recording commitments to different competitive labels. Despite the frustration and impatience of Harrison and everyone else involved, the contractual obligations of the performers required protracted negotiations to resolve, and the "live" album was released in December 1971, five months after the Concert. According to George Harrison, interviewed in November 1971 on the Dick Cavett Show, Bhaskar Menon was responsible for the delay, as he wanted Capitol to make profit out of this album, while all the other record companies let the performances of their artists be used for free. This event was the first significant benefits concert for humanitarian causes organized and supported by musicians.

It was later revealed that Menon was not the cause of the delay, but rather Harrison's manager, Allen Klein, who was attempting to leverage Capitol's desire to release the album in time for the Christmas shopping season in order to secure financial gain for himself. Klein later served prison time for, in part, having illegally profited from sales of the album.

== Awards and honors ==
Menon served as president of the International Federation of the Phonographic Industry, the trade association of the world recording industry, with 1,100 members and national groups in 71 countries. He was elected to the newly created position of chairman of the board of the federation. He was awarded the IFPI "Medal of Honor" in recognition of his services to the worldwide music industry . He remained a director of the American Recording Industry Association, (RIAA) from 1971 to 1990.

In 1990, Menon was appointed to the rank of "Chevalier de l'Ordre des Arts et des Lettres" (Knight of the Order of Arts and Letters) by the French Minister of Culture. This order is one of the principal decorations conferred by the French Republic to honor individuals who had distinguished themselves by their contributions to the influence of the arts and literature. Other recipients of the Award include Herbert von Karajan, Wilhelm Kempff, Ray Charles, Leonard Cohen and Jack Nicholson.

== After EMI ==
Menon became the chairman of I.M.I. (International Media Investments Incorporated), which he founded in 1995. This Beverly Hills-based company provides investment support and consultancy services for new and developing creative ventures in media, entertainment and leisure businesses. He also served as a director on the boards of corporations in the US, Europe & Asia, including as an independent director of NDTV.com from 2005 to 2016.

Menon died on 4 March 2021 at the age of 86 and was survived by his wife and two sons.

== Sources ==
- " The Man Who Runs Rock & Roll", New Musical Express, 1978
- History of the EMI Group, 1970 - 1979
- Biography of Mr Vijaya Bhaskar Menon from NDTV.com, VIJAYA BHASKAR MENON NDTV.COM
- The EMI Group History page, UK, EMI History
- NOW ON CD'S, FIRST 4 BEATLES ALBUMS, The New York Times, By JON PARELES Published: 25 February 1987, https://www.nytimes.com/1987/02/25/arts/now-on-cd-s-first-4-beatles-albums.html
- Dark Side of the Moon: The Making of the Pink Floyd Masterpiece – Google Books by John Harris – 2006 – Music – 191 pages,
- The Menon mantra -- "Don't stretch a brand beyond its capacity", 1999 Indian Financial Express Newspapers, The Menon mantra -- Don't stretch a brand beyond its capacity
- Memories of Menon, excerpted from the FYI Music news blog, 7/11/2008 at :fyimusic.ca » Blog Archive » When the going gets tough the critics love to chatter
