= Comment ça va =

Single by The Shorts

from the album Comment ça va
- Released: February 1983
- Genre: Pop
- Length: 3:27
- Label: EMI
- Songwriter: Eddy de Heer
- Producer: Jack de Nijs alias Jack Jersey

The Shorts singles chronology
"Don't Wanna Do It" (1981)	"Comment ça va" (1983)	"Je suis, tu es" (1983)

"Comment ça va" (French for "How is it going?") is a 1983 pop song by Dutch boy band The Shorts.

== Description ==
The song deals about a boy who meets a French girl in Paris. In the English version they cannot understand each other because they speak different languages, but in the original Dutch version they have no such problem because the boy knows French.

== Release and Commercial performance ==
It was originally written in English by Dutch composer Eddy de Heer, but EMI insisted on a Dutch version which was written by Jack Jersey who also produced this song. The Dutch version was released as a single, but was neglected by the official Dutch radio stations. After 10,000 singles were sold, with only airplay on pirate radio, the official radio stations started playing the song and it went to the number one spot in the Dutch Top 40. It quickly became an international hit, selling about 4 million singles, with versions in English, German, French, Spanish, Portuguese, etc.

== Other versions ==
Ingela "Pling" Forsman wrote lyrics in Swedish, also named "Comment ça va", which was recorded by Kikki Danielsson and released on the album Singles Bar in 1983, and as a single with "Du skriver dina kärlekssånger" as B-side. With her recording, Kikki Danielsson scored a hit in the Nordic region in mid 1983, peaking at #3 on the Norwegian singles chart. Norwegian singer Bente Lind also recorded a Norwegian version of the song in 1983. René Simard recorded a French version in 1984, Patrick Sébastien in 1989 and Queen Ida in 1994.

It was first performed in Hungary in the mid-1980s by the Fáraó Band (in Hungarian, only keeping in French the refrain: Comment ça va; Comme ci, comme ci, comme ça), then, after its high popularity, by other artists, for example György Korda and Klári Balázs.

Also with : C.C. Band, Bob dechamps, J.R. Williams, Jörg Engels, Ralph Peeker in 1983, Cynthia in 1984, Jorge Ferreira in 1985, Max Down in 1986, Sam Gooris in 1999, Mike Bauhaus in 2002, Guy Denys in 2008, Danny D, Linda, Márió a Harmonikás in 2014, Sugarfree in 2015, Hank Damen, Les horizons in 2017, Gert Ekkelboom in 2018, Dziku in 2019, Strato-Vani, Hengeler Weend Blaozers in 2021, Frans Baggerman in 2023, etc.

== Chart performance ==
=== The Shorts ===
Chart (1983)	Peak position
Austrian Singles Chart	5
Dutch Top 40	1
Norwegian Singles Chart	8
Swiss Singles Chart	6
France	1
Belgium	1
Germany	5

Chart (1984)	Peak position
France	18

=== Kikki Danielsson ===
Chart (1983)	Peak position
Norwegian Singles Chart	3

== Sales and certifications ==
Certifications for Comment ça va
Region	Certification	Certified units/sales
Netherlands (NVPI)	Gold	100,000^{^}
^{^} Shipments figures based on certification alone.

== See also ==
- List of Dutch Top 40 number-one singles of 1983
