= Ria Valk =

Dutch singer

Ria Valk (born 11 February 1941 in Eindhoven) is a Dutch singer, presenter, actress, lyricist and painter. She is best known as a singer of cheerful and comical songs. She acted in the TV series Zeg 'ns Aaa and paints figurative art.

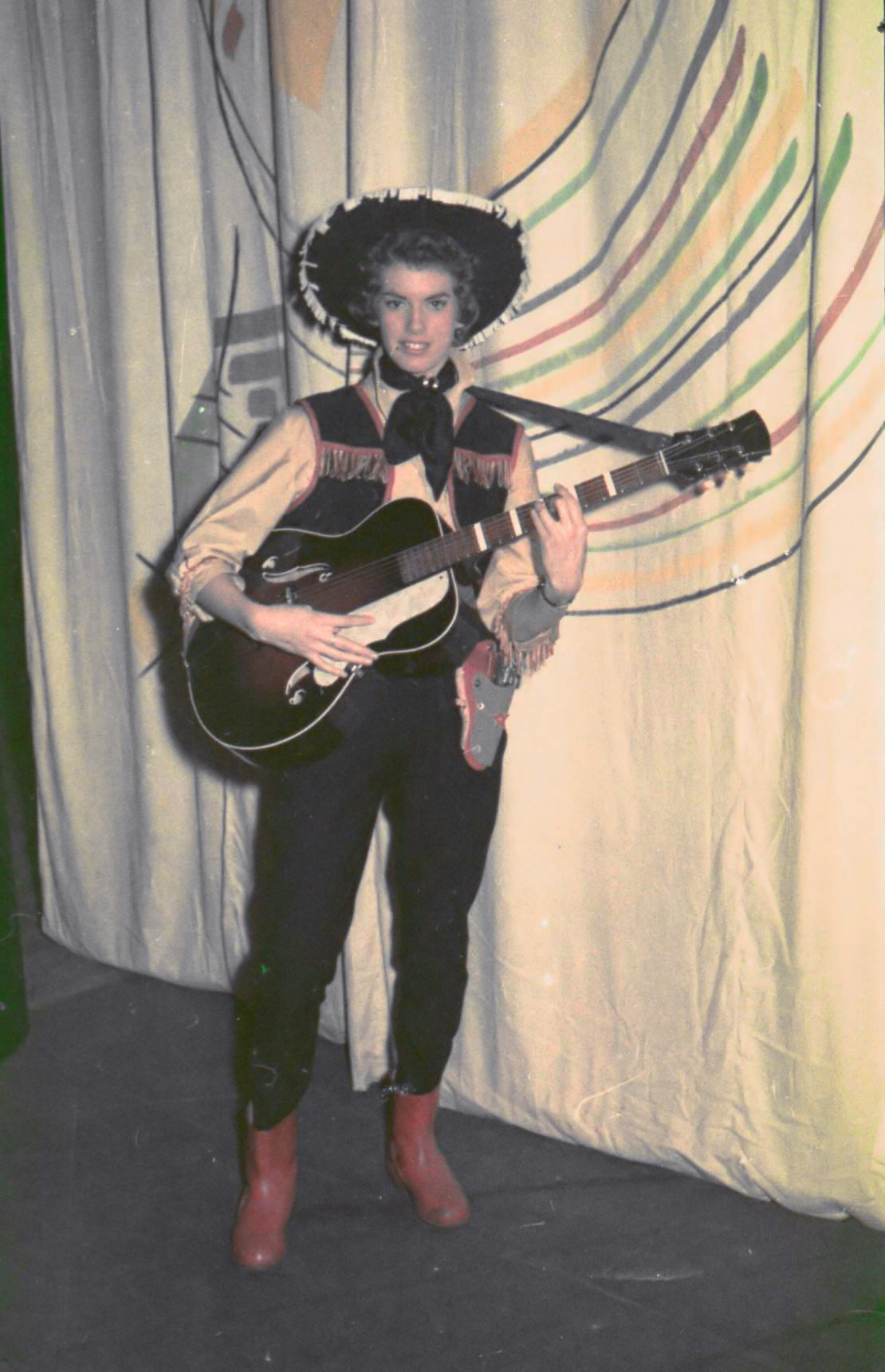
Ria Valk

== Biography ==
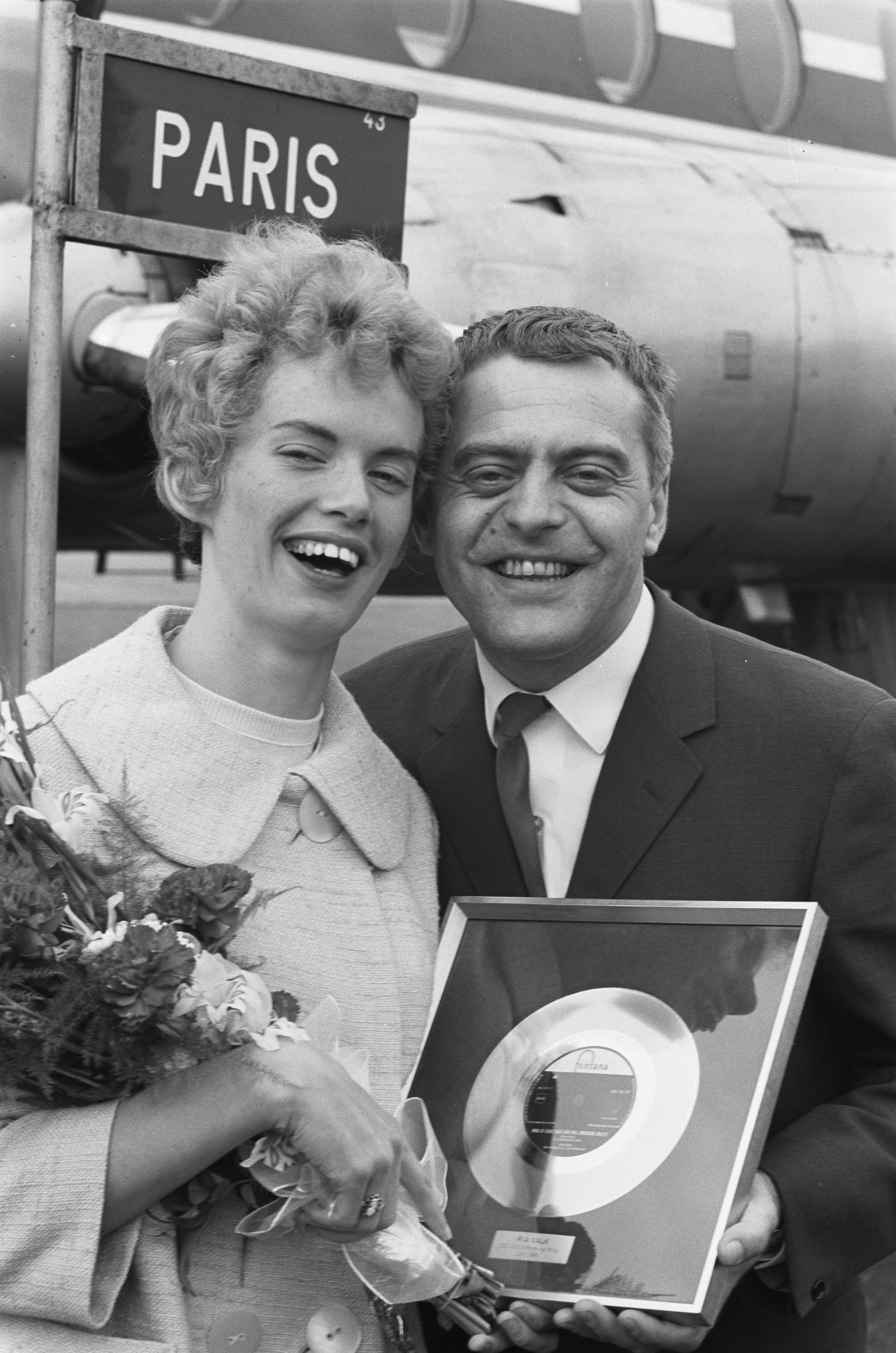
Ria Valk and Stig Anderson

In 1949 the family moved to Amsterdam East. She learned to play the guitar from a neighbour. If Valk learned to play the guitar within a month, she was allowed to keep the guitar. And so it happened. In September 1958 she participated in a talent show organized by Kees Manders in his cabaret Het Uiltje on Thorbeckeplein. Valk won the first prize of the 'cabaret of unknowns' and received a contract from Manders for his cabaret.

In May 1959 she came second behind winner Pim Maas in an Elvis impersonation competition with her performance of Tutti Frutti. This concerned the election of the Dutch Elvis Presley, in Cinema Royal. Valk appeared in black and orange striped trousers, with boots and a cowboy hat in the spotlight.

AVRO producer Roel Balten contracted her to perform in La Courtine in France for Dutch soldiers. That year she also performed for the first time for television in the AVRO program Nieuwe Oogst. In September 1959 she appeared in the Bambamboe show of the AVRO and also made her first record of this new dance craze Dans de Bambamboe. Her career had really taken off now.

In her early years she devoted herself to rock and roll and in 1961 scored the hit song Hou je echt nog van mij, Rocking Billy?, a translation of the Swedish song Är du kär i mej ännu, Klas-Göran by the later ABBA manager Stig Anderson. In 1961 she took part in the Knokke festival with Ramses Shaffy, Herman van Keeken and Conny Vandenbos.

Together with Rob de Nijs, Trea Dobbs, Marijke Merckens and Kitty Courbois, Valk acted and sang in the television show TV magazine, in which, in addition to humorous songs, she also got to sing serious material from Harrie Geelen, Dick Poons and Hans Peters. A number of songs from the program were recorded on the lp TV Magazine 1965 on the DECCA label. In 2011 three preserved shows were released on DVD. In these episodes she sings, among others, The French song, Colinda and the duet Jij en ik with Rob de Nijs.

In 1966 Ria sang in Prague and Bratislava together with Rex Gildo and Udo Jürgens. In 1966 she made a short TV show for Czechoslovak television and then released a single and an EP on the Czechoslovak label Suprahon.

At the end of the sixties she had a series of minor hits with comic songs: Dan moet je me zuster zien (1967), Casatschok (1969), Vrijgezellenflat (1969), Parfum Marie (1969), Fotomodel (1970), Met Iwan op de divan (1970) and Onze Griek (1971). In the 1970s she switched to the carnival genre. With her carnival hits De liefde van de man gaat door de maag (better known as the chorus: Ik heb worstjes op mijn borstjes) from 1975 and Leo (1976) she continued to shape her image of jolly girl.

In the period 1986 to 1993 she appeared alongside Carry Tefsen and Sjoukje Hooymaayer in the comedy series Zeg 'ns Aaa as Annie Kalkman, the sister of Mien Dobbelsteen. During the same period she collaborated with the Greek composer Nikos Ignatiadis known for the great hits of Benny Neyman. This resulted in the listening songs Want zolang je bij mij bent, Dat is echt iets voor mij and the lyrically written song about the death of her husband Waarom blijft de zon toch schijnen. Ignatiadis also accompanied her on several performances.

In the mid-1990s she focused on painting figurative art. In addition to exhibitions, painted birthday calendars and screen prints of her paintings followed.

== International records ==
- 1961 Singapur-Jacky / Mein Bonny FONTANA 266 277 TG – Germany
- 1961 Rockin rodeo: My Bonnie is over the ocean / Poor old Joe / Rocking Billy / I’m an old cowhand FONTANA 463 240 TE – EP Europe
- 1962 Tommy aus Tennessee / Der Stern, den der Sheriff so gern hat FONTANA 266 302 TF – Germany
- 1963 Happy Cowboy / Lasso Lilly FONTANA YF 278 022 – Germany
- 1965 Santo Domingo / Denk daran DECCA D 19 686 – Germany
- 1965 Ich denke immer nur an Peter / Tamara Träumt von wiedersehen DECCA D 19 744 – Germany
- 1967 Danse mama, danse papa, danse / Singapore Jackie / Surfin’ Señorita / Tommy aus Tennessee SUPRAPHON SUK 33675 – EP Czechoslovakia
- 1967 Poor old Joe / Tommy aus Tennessee SUPRAPHON SUK 013 0155 – Czechoslovakia
- 1977 Charly / Wo mich niemand kennt COLUMBIA 1C 006 32 165 – Germany
- 1978 Iets bijzonders VREC SV LP 3145 – LP Canada

== International gigs ==
- 1959 Performances for soldiers in La Courtine, France (with Wama's, Rita Reys and the Cocktail Trio)
- 1961 International Eurovision Song Contest Monte Carlo, Monaco (with a.o. Vico Torriani, Ria achieved 4th place)
- 1961 Knokke Festival, Belgium (with Ramses Shaffy, Herman van Keeken and Conny Vandenbos)
- 1966 Concert series in Prague and Bratislava (with Rex Gildo and Udo Jürgens)
- 1998 Tour in Melbourne, Australia (with Saskia and Serge)
- 2011 Houden van, Sportpaleis Antwerp, Belgium (with Dana Winner)

== Miscellaneous ==
- King Mwami of the Belgian Congo had all gramophone records sent by Ria Valk. He considered himself the biggest fan.
- In Finland, chewing gum from the Hellas brand allowed you to collect 95 pictures of movie stars and artists: Doris Day, Elizabeth Taylor, Nathalie Wood, Rock Hudson, Brigitte Bardot. In this series Ria Valk was number 58.
- In the Donald Duck of 2019, Ria comes along with her first hit. From the radio with Katrien, sounds: "Hou je echt nog van mij, Rocking Robbie".
