= The Shorts =

Dutch pop band

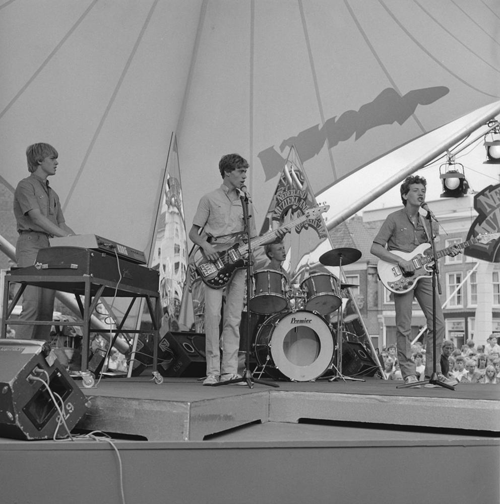

Background information
- Origin: Netherlands
- Genres: Country, Pop
- Years active: 1976-1987
- Past members: Hans van Vondelen; Erik de Wildt; Hans Stokkermans; Peter Wezenbeek

The Shorts was a pop group from the Netherlands consisting of Hans van Vondelen (vocals), Erik de Wildt (keyboard), Hans Stokkermans (bass guitar) and Peter Wezenbeek (drums). The group was formed in 1976, and scored a 1983 international hit with "Comment ça va" produced by Jack Jersey. Last "recorded" appearance is from Sopot Festival 1984.

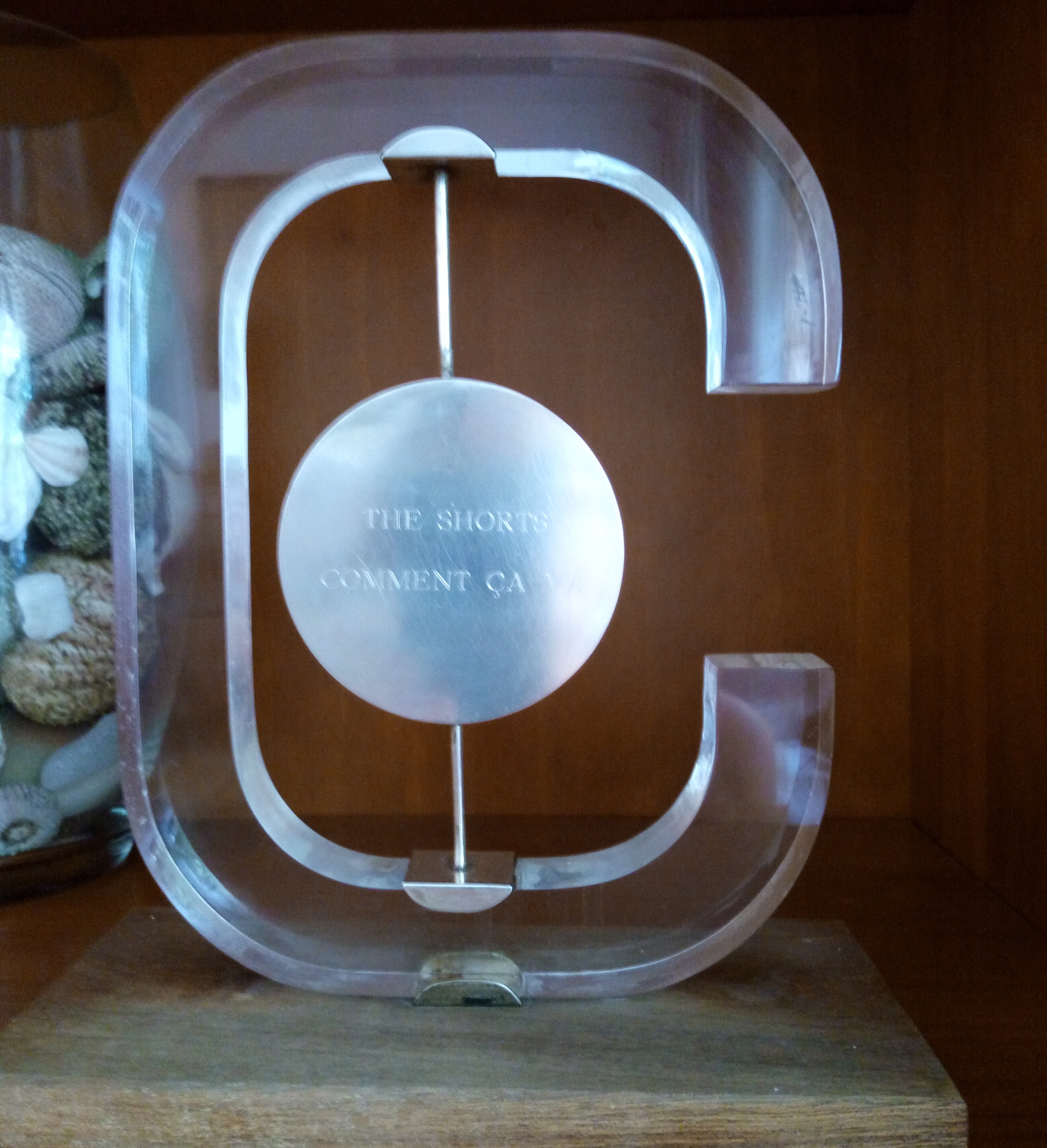
Conamus Exportprijs - The Shorts

== History ==
The Shorts were founded under the name De Bliksemafleiders in Leiden in 1977 by producer Danny de Heer. On a talent show he discovered Hans van Vondelen, Erik de Wildt, Peter Wezenbeek, Frank van der Ven and Hans Stokkermans . The then eleven-year-old boys mainly played on a children's show by Eddy de Heer and Danny de Heer. After a few years, the boys made their own single. This single was not a success, but Eddy de Heer wrote the song Comment ça va (in English) as encouragement. After visiting all record companies for a year, record company EMI was willing to release the song (thanks to Ruud Wams of Paloma Music) but in a Dutch version, which was recorded in the Stone sound studio in Roosendaal and written and produced by Jack de Nijs.

De Bliksemafleiders were now called The Shorts. The Dutch song Comment ça va was initially played mainly on pirate radio, but quickly became a great commercial success. In 1983 it was the best-selling single in the Netherlands. The single was translated into English, Spanish, German and Chinese and released in several countries. In total, more than four million copies were sold. In 1983 The Shorts, Eddy de Heer and Jack de Nijs were awarded the Conamus Export Prize for their international success with Comment ça va.

The following singles from The Shorts could no longer match the success. After several changes in the group, the group split up in 1987.

== Recent history ==
Hans van Vondelen owns Fendal Sound Studios.Peter Wezenbeek is an owner of J.P. Audio Visueel BV and Droomtent recording studio. Hans Stokkermans is a detective and continues intensively playing as a musician on bass guitar. Erik de Wildt's owns a drug store.

== Discography ==
The Shorts released two albums and 14 singles.

=== Comment ça va ===
Comment ça va

Studio album by The Shorts
- Released: 1983
- Length: 41:11
- Label: EMI

==== Track list ====
1. Comment Ça Va 3:30
2. One Pair 3:24
3. Een Beetje Vuur 3:41
4. Ik Zing 3:55
5. Springtime 2:37
6. I'm A Musician 4:42
7. Je Suis, Tu Es 3:35
8. Subway Love 4:15
9. I'm Saving 3:25
10. Annabelle 3:46
11. Goodbye, Don't Cry 4:21

=== M'n laaste concert ===
Second album from 1987.

Track listing

1. Splash Intro 2:16
2. Het Monster Van Loch Ness 4:30
3. Ze Was Zo Mooi 3:18
4. Vrienden 3:35
5. Margriet Uit Hazerswoude 3:36
6. Goodbye Irene 3:47
7. M'n Laatste Concert 3:26
8. Annelies 3:52
9. Maar Toen Kwam Jij 3:37
10. Verboden Toegang 2:54
11. In De Twintigste Eeuw 4:15
12. Door De Bocht 4:09

=== Singles ===
CNR

- Don't wanna do it (1981)

EMI

- Annabelle (1983)
- Comment Ça Va (1983)
- Je Suis, Tu Es / Ik Zing (1983)
- Que Tal Te Va (Comment Ça VA) (promo) (1984)
- Je Hebt Het Maar Geleend (1984)
- Tschüss (1984)
- Helemaal Te Gek (1984)

Sky

- Ze Was Zo Mooi / She Was So Nice (1985)
- Christmas-Eve (1985)
- Door De Bocht (1985)
- Maar Toen Kwam Jij (1986)
- M'n Laatste Concert (1987)

Telstar

- Verboden Toegang (1986)
