= Frank Michael =

Italian-born Belgian singer (1947–2026)

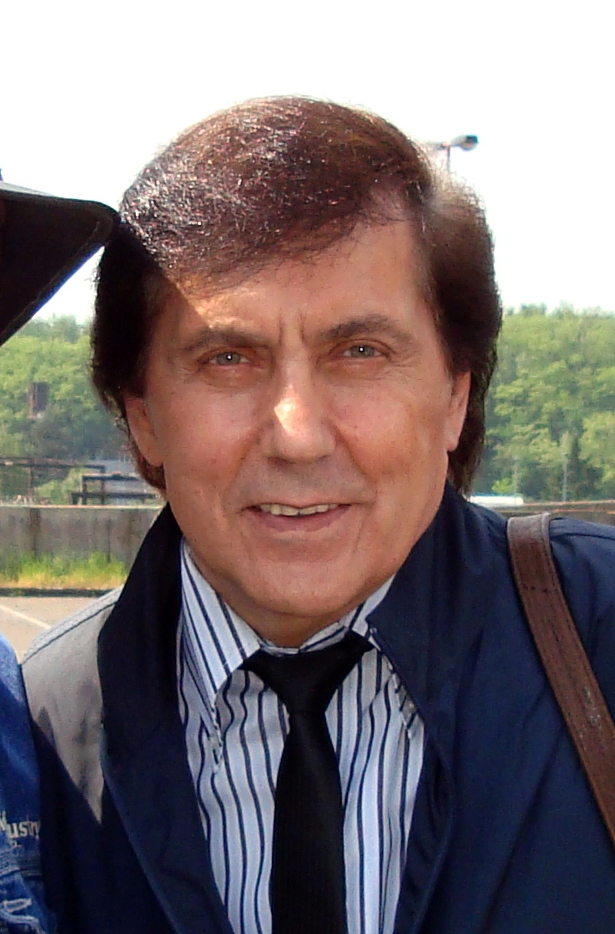
- Michael in 2011

Background information
- Born: Franco Gabelli; 7 May 1947; Bedonia, Italy
- Origin: Seraing, Belgium
- Died: 12 June 2026 (aged 79) Liège, Belgium
- Genres: Pop
- Occupation: Singer
- Instrument: Vocals
- Years active: 1974–2025

Franco Gabelli (7 May 1947 – 12 June 2026), better known by the stage name Frank Michael, was a Belgian singer of Italian origin. He reportedly sold millions of albums throughout the world.

== Life and career ==
At the age of three, Franco's family left Italy and resided in Seraing, province of Liège, Belgium. At age 16, he started working as a television electronics technician. His singing career was launched with the 1974 single "Je ne peux vivre sans toi," released on RCA. He was popular at live concerts and released a number of albums that charted in France and Belgium. His best songs came from his collaboration with Michel Mallory, although he worked with many other songwriters as well.

In 2003, he also released a homage album entitled Thank You Elvis with 15 tracks of Elvis Presley in French and Italian. He remains popular particularly with the older generations. In 2004, he received the Belgian Order of the Crown.

Michael died from lung cancer on 12 June 2026, at the age of 79.

== Discography ==
=== Albums ===
Year	Album	Description	Peak positions			
Year	Album	Description	BEL (WA)	FRA	GER	SWI
1996	Les grands tubes vol. 2		34	–	–	–
1997	Toutes les femmes sont belles		34	39	–	–
1997	Les plus belles chansons italiennes		35	–	–	–
1998	Le chanteur des amoureux		24	34	–	–
1999	Olympia 99	Live album	49	40	–	–
2000	Il est toujours question d'amour...		35	9	–	–
2001	L'essentiel – 20 succès inoubliables	Compilation	6	98	–	–
2001	D'amour et de tendresse		–	–	–	–
2001	Olympia 2001	Live album	46	21	–	–
2003	Entre nous		10	8	–	60
2003	Thank You Elvis		31	19	–	–
2004	Olympia 2003	Live album	77	54	–	–
2004	La force des femmes		25	8	–	–
2005	J'peux pas t'oublier		–	159	–	–
2005	Crooner		–	137	–	–
2005	Chansons italiennes		–	189	–	–
2005	Pour toujours		22	–	69	–
2006	Ti amo, je t'aime		45	–	–	–
2006	Les couleurs de ma vie		8	6	–	–
2007	Au Palais des Sports – Live 2007	Live album	46	57	–	–
2008	Mes hommages		20	25	–	–
2009	Rue des amours		26	10	–	–
2010	Joyeux Noël		16	22	–	–
2010	Coffret (2 CDs)	Compilation album	–	199	–	–
2011	Les chansons d'amour		41	152	–	–
2011	Romantique	Compilation album	8	7	–	–
2013	Quelques mots d'amour		1	6	–	–
2014	Encore quelques mots d'amour		–	128	–	–
2014	Bonjour l'amour		7	13	–	–
2015	Toi, l'amour et moi		3	4	–	–
2015	Mes premiers amours (1975–1985)	Compilation album	9	22	–	–
2016	Écouter les femmes		4	26	–	–
2017	La Saint-Amour		4	11	–	84
2019	Le grand amour		5	8	–	–
2021	L'amour pour toujours – Les plus belles chansons de Frank Michael	Compilation album	25	–	–	–
2022	Je vous aime toutes		6	9	–	–
2023	La symphonie de l'amour		25	16	–	–

=== Singles ===
Year	Single	Peak positions			Album
Year	Single	BEL (WA)	FRA	SWI	Album
2001	"Il est toujours question d'amour"	–	63	–	Il est toujours question d'amour...
2003	"Après tant d'années d'amour"	14	7	91	
2005	"Pour toutes les mamans"	13	21	–	
