= Ben Liebrand discography =

This is the discography of Dutch DJ Ben Liebrand.

== Singles ==
Year	Single	Peak positions			Album
Year	Single	AUS	NED	UK	Album
1990	"Puls(t)ar"	—	—	68	Styles
1990	"I Wish" (featuring Nasty Chat)	145	—	84	Styles
1990	"Move to the Bigband" (featuring Tony Scott)	117	15	84	Styles
1991	"Give Me an Answer" (featuring CJ & CP)	—	—	—	Styles
2000	"Music & Passion" (featuring Gibson Brothers)	—	91	—	Single only
"—" denotes releases that did not chart or were not released.

== Remixes and megamixes in charts ==
Year	Artist	Single	Peak positions										Album
Year	Artist	Single	NED	BEL (FLA)	FRA	GER	AUT	SWI	IRE	UK	AUS	NZ	Album
1985	Tavares	"Heaven Must Be Missing an Angel" (Irresistible Angel Mix)	11	11	—	—	—	—	8	12	—	—	The Very Best Of (by Tavares)
1985	Tavares	"Don't Take Away the Music" (Hands Off The Music Mix)	48	28	—	—	—	—	—	—	—	—	The Very Best Of (by Tavares)
1986	Tavares	"It Only Takes a Minute" (Remix by Ben Liebrand)	—	—	—	—	—	—	—	46	—	—	The Very Best Of (by Tavares)
1986	Alisha	"All Night Passion" (New Mix by Ben Liebrand)	37	—	—	—	—	—	—	—	—	—	Single only
1987	Hot Chocolate	"You Sexy Thing" (Remix by Ben Liebrand)	56	20	—	5	4	10	8	10	—	—	The Very Best Of (by Hot Chocolate)
1987	Hot Chocolate	"Every 1's a Winner" (Groove Mix)	59	—	—	14	—	—	—	69	—	—	The Very Best Of (by Hot Chocolate)
1988	Bill Withers	"Lovely Day" (Sunshine Mix)	12	8	—	27	18	—	7	4	—	—	Lovely Days (by Bill Withers)
1988	Bill Withers	"Ain't No Sunshine" (The Eclipse Mix)	26	33	—	30	—	—	—	82	—	—	Lovely Days (by Bill Withers)
1988	Vivien Vee	"Give Me a Break" (A Ben Liebrand Remix) (Italy only)	—	—	—	—	—	—	—	—	—	—	Single only
1988	Frankie Valli & the Four Seasons	"December 1963 (Oh, What a Night)" (Ben Liebrand Remix)	18	8	—	—	—	—	—	—	3	—	Hits Digitally Enhanced (by The Four Seasons)
1988	Phil Collins	"In the Air Tonight" (Ben Liebrand Extended Version)	17	—	20	3	4	2	6	4	47	—	Single only
1989	Blondie	"Call Me" (The Ben Liebrand Remix)	—	—	—	—	—	—	—	61	—	—	Once More Into the Bleach (by Blondie)
1989	Nina Hagen	"New York / N.Y." (Ben Liebrand Remix)	—	—	—	—	—	—	—	—	—	—	Single only
1989	Art of Noise	"Paranoimia '89" (Re-mixed by Ben Liebrand)	—	—	—	41	—	—	—	88	—	—	The Best Of (by Art of Noise)
1989	Jeff Wayne	"Eve of the War" (Ben Liebrand Remix)	9	38	—	—	—	—	3	3	—	—	Styles (by Ben Liebrand)
1989	Sugarhill Gang	"Rappers Delight" (Hip Hop Remix '89)	22	38	—	—	—	—	—	58	—	34	Rappers Delight (by Sugarhill Gang)
1989	Four Tops	"The Sun Ain't Gonna Shine" (The Ben Liebrand Remix)	—	—	—	—	—	—	—	84	—	—	Single only
1989	Various Artists	"Dance Classics" (The Mix)	2	6	28	—	—	—	—	—	—	—	Single only
1990	Ram Jam	"Black Betty" (Rough 'n' Ready Remix)	—	—	—	28	—	—	2	13	17	7	Single only
1990	Bill Withers	"Harlem" (Remixed by Ben Liebrand)	—	—	—	—	—	—	—	98	—	—	Lovely Days (by Bill Withers)
1990	Grandmaster Flash & Melle Mel	"White Lines (Don't Do It)" (Freestyle Remix)	78	—	—	—	—	—	—	97	—	—	Single only
1990	Ryan Paris	"Dolce Vita" (Downtown/Uptown Mix)	26	—	—	—	—	—	—	—	—	—	Single only
1990	Various Artists	"Dance Classics" (The Summer Mix)	16	49	—	—	—	—	—	—	—	—	Single only
1990	Sting	"Englishman in New York" (The Ben Liebrand Mix)	60	—	—	20	—	—	12	15	—	—	Single only
1990	Dimples D.	"Sucker DJ" (Ben Liebrand Mix)	8	25	—	16	10	—	—	17	1	2	Dimples & Spice (by Dimples D.)
1991	Natalie Cole	"This Will Be" (The Ben Liebrand Remix)	—	—	—	—	—	—	—	—	—	—	The Soul of Natalie Cole (by Natalie Cole)
1991	Salt-N-Pepa	"You Showed Me" (The Born Again Mix)	5	8	17	13	13	15	7	15	24	12	Rapped in Remixes (by Salt-N-Pepa)
1992	Salt-N-Pepa	"Do You Want Me" (Ben Liebrand Remix)	16	30	—	49	—	—	22	5	19	49	Rapped in Remixes (by Salt-N-Pepa)
1992	Salt-N-Pepa	"Expression" (Hard Ecu Mix)	—	—	13	—	—	—	23	23	—	—	Rapped in Remixes (by Salt-N-Pepa)
1992	Monie Love	"Full Term Love" (Ben Liebrand Club Mix)	58	—	—	—	—	—	—	34	—	—	Single only
1992	Salt-N-Pepa	"Start Me Up" (Remix by Ben Liebrand)	23	—	—	44	30	—	—	39	—	—	Single only
1993	Grace Jones	"7 Day Weekend" (Remix by Ben Liebrand)	86	—	—	—	—	—	—	—	—	—	Single only
1993	Paperboy	"Ditty" (Ben Liebrand Mix)	—	—	—	93	—	—	—	—	—	48	Single only
1994	Rebecca de Ruvo	"I Caught You Out" (Ben Liebrand's Station Edit)	—	—	—	—	—	—	—	72	—	—	Single only
2000	Giorgio Moroder	"The Chase" (The Minimix)	63	—	—	—	—	—	—	—	—	—	Single only
2003	Various Artists	"Typisch Tachtig Mix"	76	—	—	—	—	—	—	—	—	—	Single only
"—" denotes releases that did not chart or were not released.

== Other productions ==
- Alf - "Stuck on Earth"
- Forrest - "Rock the Boat"
- ISCO - "Funkytown"
- MDMC - "How About It"
- Lafleur - "Boogie Nights"
- Heatwave - "Grooveline"

== Additional production and remixes ==
- Rick Astley - "Never Gonna Give You Up"
- Salt-N-Pepa - "Let's Talk About Sex"
- Salt-N-Pepa - "Whatta Man"
- Salt-N-Pepa - "Expression"
- Salt-N-Pepa - "Do You Really Want Me"
- Salt-N-Pepa - "Respect Yourself"
- Fox the Fox - "Precious Little Diamond" (Special Remix) (1984 on CBS Records)
- Fun Fun - "Happy Station"
- Hot Chocolate - "You Sexy Thing"
- Hot Chocolate - "Every 1's a Winner"
- Tavares - "Heaven Must Be Missing an Angel"
- Tavares - "Don't Take Away the Music"
- Tavares - "It Only Takes a Minute"
- Tavares - "More Than a Woman"
- Jan Hammer - "Crockett's Theme"
- Nina Hagen - "New York New York"
- Grace Jones - "Victor Should Have Been a Jazz Musician"
- Bill Withers - "Lovely Day" (Sunshine Mix) (1988)
- Bill Withers - "Harlem"
- Bill Withers - "Lovely Day"
- Frankie Valli & the Four Seasons - "December 1963 (Oh What A Night)" (1988 and re-released in 1992)
- Taja Sevelle - "Love Is Contagious" (1988)
- Dimples D. - "Sucker DJ" (1991)
- Sting - "Englishman in New York" (1990)
- Crystal Waters - "Gypsy Woman (She's Homeless)" (Guitar Mix) (1992)
- Tiga - "Sunglasses at Night"
- The Flirts - "Passion"
- Sugarhill Gang - "Rappers Delight"
- Ryan Paris - "Dolce Vita"
- Madonna - "Open Your Heart" (1987)
- Wet Wet Wet - "Sweet Surrender" (1989)
- INXS - "Need You Tonight" (1988)
- The Trammps - "Disco Inferno"
- Armin van Buuren - "Communication"
- Phil Collins - "In the Air Tonight"
- Genesis - "I Can't Dance"
- Hall & Oates - "I Can't Go for That"
- Ram Jam - "Black Betty"
- Grandmaster Flash & The Furious 5 - "White Lines"
- Natalie Cole - "This Will Be"
- Alexander O'Neal - "Criticize" (1988)
- Sister Sledge - "Lost in Music"
- Mysterious Art - "The Omen" (1989)
- Michael Jackson - "Liberian Girl"
- Michael Jackson - "Bad"
- Michael Jackson - "Smooth Criminal"
- Armin van Buuren - "Old Skool"
- Armin van Buuren & HRRTZ feat. Julia Church - "Fire With Fire"

== Megamixes ==
- Grandmix 83
- Grandmix 84
- Grandmix 85
- Dance Classics the Mix
- Grandmix 86
- Grandmix 87
- Grandmix 88
- Grandmix 89
- Grandmix 90
- Grandmix 91
- Grandmix 92
- Grandmix 93
- Grandmix 94
- Grandmix 95
- Grandmix 2000
- Popmix
- Grandmix Summer Edition
- Grandmix 2001
- Grandmix Millennium Edition
- Grandmix Disco Edition
- Grandmix Disco Edition 2
- Grandmix 90's Edition
- Grandmix 90's Edition 2
- Grandmix Nouveau Disco
- Grandmix 2002
- Grandmix 2003
- Grandmix 2004
- Grandmix 2005
- Grandmix 2006
- Grandmix 2007
- Grandmix 2008
- Jaarmix 2007
- Jaarmix 2008
- Grandmix 2009
- Grandmix 2010
- Grandmix 2011
- Grandmix 2012
- Grandmix 2013
- Grandmix 2014
- Grandmix 2015
- Grandmix 2016
- Grandmix 2017
- Grandmix 2018
- Grandmix 2018 Special Edition
- Grandmix 2019
- Grandmix 2020
- Grandmix 2021
- Grandmix 2022
- Intergalactic Disco Funk 1
- Intergalactic Disco Funk 2
- Intergalactic Disco Funk 3
