= Fall in Love (Ryan Paris song) =

1984 single by Ryan Paris

Single by Ryan Paris
- B-side: "Fall in Love (Instrumental Version)"
- Released: 1984
- Genre: Italo disco
- Length: 3:50
- Label: Discomagic
- Songwriter(s): Gazebo
- Producer(s): Pierluigi Giombini

Ryan Paris singles chronology
"Dolce Vita" (1983)	"Fall in Love" (1984)	"Paris on My Mind" (1984)

"Fall in Love" is a song recorded by Italian singer Ryan Paris.

== Commercial performance ==
On 5 March 1984, the song debuted at number 75 in Germany, eventually peaking at number 67 for one week.

== Track listing and formats ==
- Italian 7-inch single

A. "Fall in Love" (Vocal Version) – 3:50
B. "Fall in Love" (Instrumental Version) – 3:45

- Italian 12-inch single

A. "Fall in Love" (Vocal) – 6:40
B. "Fall in Love" (Instrumental) – 6:35

- German 7-inch single

A. "Fall in Love" (Vocal Version) – 4:20
B. "Fall in Love" (Instrumental Version) – 3:54

- German 12-inch maxi-single

A. "Fall in Love" (Vocal Version) – 7:30
B. "Fall in Love" (Instrumental Version) – 7:00

== Credits and personnel ==
- Ryan Paris – vocals
- Gazebo – songwriter
- Pierluigi Giombini – songwriter, producer, arranger
- Marcello Spiridioni – mastering
- Michele De Luca – cover art, photographer

Credits and personnel adapted from the 7-inch single liner notes.

== Charts ==
Weekly chart performance for "Fall in Love"
Chart (1984)	Peak position
Denmark (IFPI)	15
Finland (Suomen virallinen lista)	28
West Germany (GfK)	67
