= List of number-one singles of 1983 (Spain) =

This is a list of the Spanish Singles number-ones of 1983.

== Chart history ==
| Issue date | Song | Artist |
|---|---|---|
| 3 January | "Amor de Hombre" | Mocedades |
| 10 January | "Words" | F. R. David |
| 17 January | "Words" | F. R. David |
| 24 January | "Words" | F. R. David |
| 31 January | "Words" | F. R. David |
| 7 February | "Words" | F. R. David |
| 14 February | "Words" | F. R. David |
| 21 February | "Pass the Dutchie" | Musical Youth |
| 28 February | "Words" | F. R. David |
| 7 March | "The Girl Is Mine" | Michael Jackson and Paul McCartney |
| 14 March | "Maneater" | Hall and Oates |
| 21 March | "Pass The Dutchie" | Musical Youth |
| 28 March | "You Are a Danger" | Gary Low |
| 4 April | "Words" | F. R. David |
| 11 April | "Maneater" | Daryl Hall & John Oates |
| 18 April | "Embrujada" | Tino Casal |
| 25 April | "You Are a Danger" | Gary Low |
| 2 May | "Embrujada" | Tino Casal |
| 9 May | "Embrujada" | Tino Casal |
| 16 May | "Billie Jean" | Michael Jackson |
| 23 May | "Embrujada" | Tino Casal |
| 30 May | "No Tengo Tiempo (Con los Dedos de una Mano)" | Azul y Negro |
| 6 June | "No Tengo Tiempo (Con los Dedos de una Mano)" | Azul y Negro |
| 13 June | "Embrujada" | Tino Casal |
| 20 June | "No Tengo Tiempo (Con los Dedos de una Mano)" | Azul y Negro |
| 27 June | "No Tengo Tiempo (Con los Dedos de una Mano)" | Azul y Negro |
| 4 July | "Barco a Venus" | Mecano |
| 11 July | "Barco a Venus" | Mecano |
| 18 July | "Barco a Venus" | Mecano |
| 25 July | "Barco a Venus" | Mecano |
| 1 August | "Moonlight Shadow" | Mike Oldfield |
| 8 August | "Moonlight Shadow" | Mike Oldfield |
| 15 August | "Moonlight Shadow" | Mike Oldfield |
| 22 August | "Moonlight Shadow" | Mike Oldfield |
| 29 August | "Moonlight Shadow" | Mike Oldfield |
| 5 September | "Dolce Vita" | Ryan Paris |
| 12 September | "Dolce Vita" | Ryan Paris |
| 19 September | "Dolce Vita" | Ryan Paris |
| 26 September | "Dolce Vita" | Ryan Paris |
| 3 October | "Baby Jane" | Rod Stewart |
| 10 October | "Flashdance... What a Feeling" | Irene Cara |
| 17 October | "Flashdance... What a Feeling" | Irene Cara |
| 24 October | "Flashdance... What a Feeling" | Irene Cara |
| 31 October | "Flashdance... What a Feeling" | Irene Cara |
| 7 November | "Flashdance... What a Feeling" | Irene Cara |
| 14 November | "Flashdance... What a Feeling" | Irene Cara |
| 21 November | "Flashdance... What a Feeling" | Irene Cara |
| 28 November | "I Like Chopin" | Gazebo |
| 5 December | "Flashdance... What a Feeling" | Irene Cara |
| 12 December | "Flashdance... What a Feeling" | Irene Cara |
| 19 December | "Karma Chameleon" | Culture Club |
| 26 December | "Karma Chameleon" | Culture Club |

== See also ==
- 1983 in music
- List of number-one hits (Spain)
- List of number-one singles of the 1980s in Spain
