= Severo Lombardoni =

Italian record producer (1949–2012)

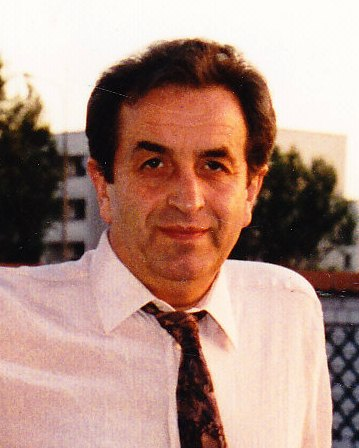
Severo Lombardoni in the mid 1990s

Severino "Severo" Lombardoni (7 March 1949 in Pedrengo at Bergamo - 13 February 2012 in Milan) was a music producer in Italy. He was founder and owner of Discomagic S.r.l and is known as a pioneer of Italo disco and Italo Dance music.

== Biography ==
Severo was the oldest child of Francesco Lombardoni and his wife Francesca, née Nava. He has had three younger siblings; his sisters Anna and Ornella, and a brother Vittorio, who are all involved in the music industry. Severo attended technical college in Seriate from 1960 to 1963 and graduated at the Conservatorio “Giuseppe Verdi” di Milano in 1969.

As a teenager Severo was a keen cyclist and regularly took part in local cycle races. He played several instruments; including the trombone, the piano, the accordion and the guitar during his time at the Conservatory in Milan, and for some years after he played in several local bands. He also worked for a year as a music teacher at a junior school.

In 1974 Lombardoni opened a record shop in his home town of Seriate. In 1977 he moved to Milan and set up a record-wholesale business.

=== DiscoMagic and Lombardoni Publishing ===
In 1979 Lombardoni established the record company DiscoMagic and the publishing company Lombardoni Edizioni Musicali. He was one of the pioneers of Italo disco music in the early 1980s and DiscoMagic was hugely successful, becoming one of the major Italo disco producers in Italy. As well as the major label Disco Magic Severo created several sub-labels to promote different music genres. In addition, DiscoMagic distributed Italian, European and worldwide titles on behalf of labels such as “Time Records”, “DWA”, “RARE” and “GGM”.

DiscoMagic had its headquarters in Via Mecenate in Milan which subsequently became the main centre for music wholesalers and producers in northern Italy.

With Lombardoni Publishing Srl Severo acted as music publisher too. Some of the composers he has collaborated with include Pierluigi Giombini, Paolo Pelandri, Domenico Ricchini, Manuel Curry and Luis Garcia Perez. His major successes included “Dolce vita” by Ryan Paris, “Happy children” by P. Lion, “Don't cry tonight” by Savage, "Shanghai", "Sayonara" by Lee Marrow; all released in 1983 and “Ride on Time” by Black Box released in 1989 . “Ride on time” from the record “Dreamland” became a huge success throughout Europe, and the United States as well, although the success was somewhat marred by copyright disputes.

In 1988 Severo established Lombardoni Musik GmbH in Germany and by 1990 the company was listed in the top ten of the most successful music publishers in Germany.

Due to financial problems, the company closed in 1997 and Severo was forced to sell the main label, “Disco Magic”, and its catalogue, to the German music producer Bernhard Mikulski (ZYX Music).

==== Productions (choice) ====
- 1983, Ryan Paris, “Dolce Vita”
- 1983, P. Lion, “Happy Children”
- 1983, Savage, “Don't cry tonight”
- 1985, Lee Marrow "Shanghai"
- 1985, Lee Marrow "Sayonara"
- 1987, Lee Marrow "Don't Stop The Music"
- 1988, Savage, “So Close”
- 1990, Sabrina Salerno, “Yeah Yeah”
- Joe Yellow, “I'm Your Lover”
- Den Harrow, “A Taste Of Love, To Meet Me”
- Gary Low, “You Are a Danger”

==== Sublabels (choice) ====
- “Out”
- “High Energy”
- “Sensation Records”
- “Out Records”
- “Trash Records”
- “Yellowstone Records”

=== Hitland ===
Since the end of the 1990s Severo worked for some years with his son Matteo publishing collections and reprints of Italo disco hits of the 1980s under the label “Hitland”. In recent years he continued the “Hitland” label with his first wife Marilena.

Severo had a son, Matteo, with his first wife and a daughter, Francesca, with his second wife Adriana. He died on February 13, 2012, of an Intracranial hemorrhage. His funeral was held at the church Madonna Aiuto dei Cristiani in Milan, followed by a burial at the cemetery in Pedrengo/Bergamo.
