= List of number-one hits of 1983 (Flanders) =

These hits topped the Ultratop 50 in the Flanders region of Belgium in 1983.

Issue date	Song	Artist
1 January	"I Don't Wanna Dance"	Eddy Grant
8 January	"You Can't Hurry Love"	Phil Collins
15 January	"You Can't Hurry Love"	Phil Collins
22 January	"You Can't Hurry Love"	Phil Collins
29 January	"Save Your Love"	Renée and Renato
5 February	"Save Your Love"	Renée and Renato
12 February	"Save Your Love"	Renée and Renato
19 February	"Save Your Love"	Renée and Renato
26 February	"Goodnight Saigon"	Billy Joel
5 March	"Goodnight Saigon"	Billy Joel
12 March	"Billie Jean"	Michael Jackson
19 March	"Billie Jean"	Michael Jackson
26 March	"Billie Jean"	Michael Jackson
2 April	"Fame"	Irene Cara
9 April	"Too Shy"	Kajagoogoo
16 April	"99 Luftballons"	Nena
23 April	"99 Luftballons"	Nena
30 April	"99 Luftballons"	Nena
7 May	"Let's Dance"	David Bowie
14 May	"Let's Dance"	David Bowie
21 May	"Beat It"	Michael Jackson
28 May	"Beat It"	Michael Jackson
4 June	"Beat It"	Michael Jackson
11 June	"Beat It"	Michael Jackson
18 June	"Comment ça va"	The Shorts
25 June	"Comment ça va"	The Shorts
2 July	"Comment ça va"	The Shorts
9 July	"Comment ça va"	The Shorts
16 July	"Baby Jane"	Rod Stewart
23 July	"Manuel Goodbye"	Audrey Landers
30 July	"The Star Sisters"	Stars on 45 Proudly Presents The Star Sisters
6 August	"Moonlight Shadow"	Mike Oldfield
13 August	"Moonlight Shadow"	Mike Oldfield
20 August	"Moonlight Shadow"	Mike Oldfield
27 August	"Moonlight Shadow"	Mike Oldfield
3 September	"Wrap Your Arms Around Me"	Agnetha Fältskog
10 September	"Wrap Your Arms Around Me"	Agnetha Fältskog
17 September	"Dolce Vita"	Ryan Paris
24 September	"Dolce Vita"	Ryan Paris
1 October	"Dolce Vita"	Ryan Paris
8 October	"Codo (...düse im Sauseschritt)"	Tauchen Prokopetz
15 October	"Codo (...düse im Sauseschritt)"	Tauchen Prokopetz
22 October	"Red Red Wine"	UB40
29 October	"Karma Chameleon"	Culture Club
5 November	"Karma Chameleon"	Culture Club
12 November	"Karma Chameleon"	Culture Club
19 November	"Karma Chameleon"	Culture Club
26 November	"All Night Long (All Night)"	Lionel Richie
3 December	"All Night Long (All Night)"	Lionel Richie
10 December	"(Hey You) The Rock Steady Crew"	Rock Steady Crew
17 December	"(Hey You) The Rock Steady Crew"	Rock Steady Crew
24 December	"Come Back and Stay"	Paul Young
31 December	"Happy Station"	Fun Fun

== See also ==
- 1983 in music
