= Gazebo (album) =

Studio album by Gazebo
- Released: 1983
- Studio: Titania, Grop (Rome)
- Genre: Italo disco; synth-pop
- Length: 39:21
- Label: Baby
- Producer: Pierluigi Giombini; Paul Micioni; Roberto Fusar Poli

Gazebo chronology
Gazebo (1983)	Telephone Mama (1984)

Singles from Gazebo
- 1. "Masterpiece" Released: 1982; 2. "I Like Chopin" Released: 4 September 1983; 3. "Love in Your Eyes" Released: 1983; 4. "Lunatic" Released: 1983

Gazebo is the debut studio album by Italian singer-songwriter Gazebo, released in 1983 by Baby Records.

== Track listing ==
All tracks are written by Gazebo and Pierluigi Giombini, except where noted.

Gazebo – Side one
No.	Title	Writer(s)	Length
1.	"Lunatic"		3:56
2.	"Love in Your Eyes"		7:49
3.	"London - Paris"	Gazebo	4:00
4.	"Masterpiece"	Gazebo; Giombini; Peter Micioni	4:05
Total length:			19:50

Gazebo – Side two
No.	Title	Length
1.	"I Like Chopin"	7:40
2.	"Wrap the Rock"	3:10
3.	"Midnight Cocktail"	5:06
4.	"Gimmick!"	3:35
Total length:		19:31

== Personnel ==
Credits adapted from the album's liner notes.

Musicians

- Gazebo – lead vocals
- Pierluigi Giombini – piano, synthesizers
- Giovanni Civitenga – bass
- Derek Wilson – drums
- Lucio Fabbri – string arrangements and conductor
- Lawrence Meinardi – backing vocals
- Natasha Maimone – backing vocals

Production and design

- Pierluigi Giombini – producer
- Paul Micioni – producer
- Roberto Fusar Poli – producer
- Gianpaolo Bresciani – sound engineer, mixing
- Massimiliano Di Carlo – sound engineer, mixing
- Lucilla Visciani – photography
- Enzo Mombrini – art direction
- Erminia Munari – art direction

== Charts ==
=== Weekly charts ===
Weekly chart performance for Gazebo
Chart (1983–1984)	Peak position
Finnish Albums (Suomen virallinen lista)	9
German Albums (Offizielle Top 100)	4
Italian Albums (Musica e dischi)	6
Swedish Albums (Sverigetopplistan)	38
Swiss Albums (Schweizer Hitparade)	16

=== Year-end charts ===
Year-end chart performance for Gazebo
Chart (1984)	Position
German Albums (Offizielle Top 100)	42
