= Garry Lowe (disambiguation) =

Garry Lowe may refer to:

- Garry Lowe (born 1953), Australian rules footballer
- Garry Lowe (footballer, born 1967), English footballer, see List of Bury F.C. players (1–24 appearances)

== See also ==
- Gary Lowe (1934-2017), American football player
- Gary Low (born 1954), Italian singer
