= Asami Kobayashi =

Japanese singer and composer (born 1953)

- 小林麻美
- Born: 29 November 1953 (age 72); Kōriyama, Fukushima Prefecture, Japan
- Other name: Toshiko Tanabe

Asami Kobayashi (Japanese: 小林麻美; born 29 November 1953), which is the stage name for Toshiko Tanabe (Japanese: 田邉 稔子), is a Japanese singer, actress and model.

== Life and career ==
Born in Kōriyama, Kobayashi started her career as an idol while still at high school; she made her record debut in 1972 with "Hatsukoi no merodī" (初恋のメロディー; "Melody of First Love"), which reached the 18th position on the Oricon Singles Chart. She eventually had her breakout in the late 1970s as a model and an actress for commercials of major brands such as Shiseido and Parco.

Kobayashi's major hit was the 1984 song "Amaoto wa Chopin no Shirabe" (雨音はショパンの調べ; "The Sound of Rain is Chopin's Music"), a cover of Gazebo's "I Like Chopin" with Japanese lyrics by Yumi Matsutoya; the song peaked at the top of the Oricon Singles Chart for three weeks. She also worked as an actress in TV dramas and films. In 1991, she married and retired from show business to focus on her family.

Kobayashi made her official comeback in 2016, posing on the cover of the magazine Kunel. In 2020, she was the subject of a biography, Kobayashi Asami ― dai ni-maku (小林麻美―第二幕; "Kobayashi Mami ― The Second Act"), written by Hiroshi Nobue.

== Discography ==
=== Singles ===
#	Title	Release date
1	Hatsukoi no Melody (初恋のメロディー, Melody of First Love); Debut single	1972-08-05
2	Rakuyō no Melody (落葉のメロディー, Melody of Falling Leaves)	1972-12-20
3	Koi no Lesson (恋のレッスン, Love Lesson)	1973-04-20
4	Aru Jijō (ある事情, Certain Circumstances)	1974-10-05
5	Apartment no Kagi (アパートの鍵, The Apartment Key)	1975-02-20
6	Watashi no Kanashimi (私のかなしみ, My Sadness)	1975-07-05
7	Yume no Atosaki (夢のあとさき, After the Dream)	1976-02-20
8	Amaoto wa Chopin no Shirabe (雨音はショパンの調べ, The Sound of Rain is Chopin's Music); Biggest hit	1984-04-21
9	Kanashimi no Spy (哀しみのスパイ, Spy of Sadness)	1984-11-21
10	Chiffon no Sasayaki (シフォンの囁き, Chiffon Whispers)	1985-05-22
11	Utsuri Yuku Kokoro (移りゆく心, A Changing Heart)	1987-03-05
12	I Miss You (アイ・ミス・ユー)	1987-06-21
