= List of number-one hits of 1983 (Germany) =

This is a list of the German Media Control Top 100 Singles Chart number-ones of 1983.

Key
†	Indicates best-performing single and album of 1983

Issue date	Song	Artist	Album	Artist
3 January	"Do You Really Want to Hurt Me?"	Culture Club	"Rock Classics"	Peter Hofmann
10 January	"Do You Really Want to Hurt Me?"	Culture Club	"...Famous Last Words..."	Supertramp
17 January	"Do You Really Want to Hurt Me?"	Culture Club	"...Famous Last Words..."	Supertramp
24 January	"Do You Really Want to Hurt Me?"	Culture Club	"...Famous Last Words..."	Supertramp
31 January	"Major Tom (Völlig Losgelöst)" †	Peter Schilling	"...Famous Last Words..."	Supertramp
7 February	"Major Tom (Völlig Losgelöst)" †	Peter Schilling	"The Getaway"	Chris De Burgh
14 February	"Major Tom (Völlig Losgelöst)" †	Peter Schilling	"Nena" †	Nena
21 February	"Major Tom (Völlig Losgelöst)" †	Peter Schilling	"Nena" †	Nena
28 February	"Major Tom (Völlig Losgelöst)" †	Peter Schilling	"Nena" †	Nena
7 March	"Major Tom (Völlig Losgelöst)" †	Peter Schilling	"Nena" †	Nena
14 March	"Major Tom (Völlig Losgelöst)" †	Peter Schilling	"Nena" †	Nena
21 March	"Major Tom (Völlig Losgelöst)" †	Peter Schilling	"Aerobic - Fitness Dancing"	Sydne Rome
28 March	"99 Luftballons"	Nena	"Nena" †	Nena
4 April	"Too Shy"	Kajagoogoo	"Nena" †	Nena
11 April	"Too Shy"	Kajagoogoo	"The Final Cut"	Pink Floyd
18 April	"Too Shy"	Kajagoogoo	"The Final Cut"	Pink Floyd
25 April	"Too Shy"	Kajagoogoo	"The Final Cut"	Pink Floyd
2 May	"Too Shy"	Kajagoogoo	"Nena" †	Nena
9 May	"Bruttosozialprodukt"	Geier Sturzflug	"Nena" †	Nena
16 May	"Bruttosozialprodukt"	Geier Sturzflug	"Thriller"	Michael Jackson
23 May	"Bruttosozialprodukt"	Geier Sturzflug	"Thriller"	Michael Jackson
30 May	"Bruttosozialprodukt"	Geier Sturzflug	"Thriller"	Michael Jackson
6 June	"Juliet"	Robin Gibb	"Thriller"	Michael Jackson
13 June	"Juliet"	Robin Gibb	"Thriller"	Michael Jackson
20 June	"Juliet"	Robin Gibb	"Thriller"	Michael Jackson
27 June	"Juliet"	Robin Gibb	"Thriller"	Michael Jackson
4 July	"Juliet"	Robin Gibb	"Thriller"	Michael Jackson
11 July	"Juliet"	Robin Gibb	"Thriller"	Michael Jackson
18 July	"Baby Jane"	Rod Stewart	"Thriller"	Michael Jackson
25 July	"Baby Jane"	Rod Stewart	"Thriller"	Michael Jackson
1 August	"Baby Jane"	Rod Stewart	"Crises"	Mike Oldfield
8 August	"Codo"	DÖF	"Crises"	Mike Oldfield
15 August	"Codo"	DÖF	"Crises"	Mike Oldfield
22 August	"Codo"	DÖF	"Crises"	Mike Oldfield
29 August	"Codo"	DÖF	"Live - bess demnähx"	BAP
5 September	"Codo"	DÖF	"Crises"	Mike Oldfield
12 September	"Sunshine Reggae"	Laid Back	"Crises"	Mike Oldfield
19 September	"Sunshine Reggae"	Laid Back	"Crises"	Mike Oldfield
26 September	"Sunshine Reggae"	Laid Back	"Flashdance"	Various artists
3 October	"Sunshine Reggae"	Laid Back	"Flashdance"	Various artists
10 October	"Sunshine Reggae"	Laid Back	"Flashdance"	Various artists
17 October	"Sunshine Reggae"	Laid Back	"Flashdance"	Various artists
24 October	"I Like Chopin"	Gazebo	"Flashdance"	Various artists
31 October	"I Like Chopin"	Gazebo	"Flashdance"	Various artists
7 November	"I Like Chopin"	Gazebo	"Flashdance"	Various artists
14 November	"Come Back and Stay"	Paul Young	"Flashdance"	Various artists
21 November	"Come Back and Stay"	Paul Young	"Genesis"	Genesis
28 November	"Come Back and Stay"	Paul Young	"No Parlez"	Paul Young
5 December	"Come Back and Stay"	Paul Young	"No Parlez"	Paul Young
12 December	"Come Back and Stay"	Paul Young	"No Parlez"	Paul Young
19 December	"Come Back and Stay"	Paul Young	"No Parlez"	Paul Young
26 December	"Come Back and Stay"	Paul Young	"No Parlez"	Paul Young
