= Lunatic (song) =

1983 single by Gazebo

Single by Gazebo

from the album Gazebo
- B-side: "Lunatic (Instrumental)"
- Released: 1983
- Genre: Italo disco
- Length: 3:56
- Label: Baby
- Songwriters: Gazebo; Pierluigi Giombini
- Producer: Pierluigi Giombini

Gazebo singles chronology
"Love in Your Eyes" (1983)	"Lunatic" (1983)	"Telephone Mama" (1984)

"Lunatic" is a song by Italian singer-songwriter Gazebo from his debut studio album, Gazebo (1983).

== Track listing and formats ==
- Italian 12-inch single

A. "Lunatic" – 6:24
B. "Lunatic" (Instrumental) – 7:07

- German 7-inch single

A. "Lunatic" – 3:56
B. "Lunatic" (Instrumental) – 3:54

- German 12-inch maxi-single

A. "Lunatic" – 6:24
B. "Lunatic" (Instrumental) – 7:03

== Credits and personnel ==
- Gazebo – songwriter, vocals
- Pierluigi Giombini – songwriter, producer, arranger, programming
- Gianpaolo Bresciani – mixing
- Enzo Mombrini – cover art designer

Credits and personnel adapted from the Gazebo album and 7-inch single liner notes.

== Charts ==
=== Weekly charts ===
Weekly chart performance for "Lunatic"
Chart (1983–1984)	Peak position
Austria (Ö3 Austria Top 40)	13
Denmark (IFPI)	6
Finland (Suomen virallinen lista)	18
Italy (Musica e dischi)	5
Spain (AFYVE)	14
Switzerland (Schweizer Hitparade)	6
West Germany (GfK)	4

=== Year-end charts ===
Year-end chart performance for "Lunatic"
Chart (1984)	Position
West Germany (Official German Charts)	42
