= List of European number-one hits of 1983 =

This is a list of the Hitkrant Europarade number-one singles of 1983.

Date	Song	Artist
1 January	"Words"	F. R. David
8 January	"Words"	F. R. David
15 January	"Words"	F. R. David
22 January	"Words"	F. R. David
29 January	"Do You Really Want To Hurt Me?"	Culture Club
5 February	"Do You Really Want To Hurt Me?"	Culture Club
12 February	"Pass The Dutchie"	Musical Youth
19 February	"Do You Really Want To Hurt Me?"	Culture Club
26 February	"Do You Really Want To Hurt Me?"	Culture Club
5 March	"Do You Really Want To Hurt Me?"	Culture Club
12 March	"Billie Jean"	Michael Jackson
19 March	"Billie Jean"	Michael Jackson
26 March	"Billie Jean"	Michael Jackson
2 April	"99 Luftballons/99 Red Balloons"	Nena
9 April	"99 Luftballons/99 Red Balloons"	Nena
16 April	"99 Luftballons/99 Red Balloons"	Nena
23 April	"99 Luftballons/99 Red Balloons"	Nena
30 April	"99 Luftballons/99 Red Balloons"	Nena
7 May	"Let's Dance"	David Bowie
14 May	"Let's Dance"	David Bowie
21 May	"Let's Dance"	David Bowie
28 May	"Let's Dance"	David Bowie
4 June	"Let's Dance"	David Bowie
11 June	"Let's Dance"	David Bowie
18 June	"Let's Dance"	David Bowie
25 June	"Beat It"	Michael Jackson
2 July	"Let's Dance"	David Bowie
9 July	"Let's Dance"	David Bowie
16 July	"Juliet"	Robin Gibb
23 July	"Moonlight Shadow"	Mike Oldfield with Maggie Reilly
30 July	"Baby Jane"	Rod Stewart
6 August	"Baby Jane"	Rod Stewart
13 August	"Moonlight Shadow"	Mike Oldfield with Maggie Reilly
20 August	"Moonlight Shadow"	Mike Oldfield with Maggie Reilly
27 August	"Moonlight Shadow"	Mike Oldfield with Maggie Reilly
3 September	"Moonlight Shadow"	Mike Oldfield with Maggie Reilly
10 September	"Moonlight Shadow"	Mike Oldfield with Maggie Reilly
17 September	"Moonlight Shadow"	Mike Oldfield with Maggie Reilly
24 September	"Moonlight Shadow"	Mike Oldfield with Maggie Reilly
1 October	"Dolce Vita"	Ryan Paris
8 October	"Dolce Vita"	Ryan Paris
15 October	"Dolce Vita"	Ryan Paris
22 October	"Dolce Vita"	Ryan Paris
29 October	"Karma Chameleon"	Culture Club
5 November	"Karma Chameleon"	Culture Club
12 November	"Karma Chameleon"	Culture Club
19 November	"Karma Chameleon"	Culture Club
26 November	"Karma Chameleon"	Culture Club
3 December	"Karma Chameleon"	Culture Club
10 December	"Say Say Say"	Paul McCartney & Michael Jackson
17 December	"Karma Chameleon"	Culture Club
24 December	"Karma Chameleon"	Culture Club
31 December	"Karma Chameleon"	Culture Club
