= Sucker DJ =

Single by Dimples D.

from the album Dimples & Spice
- Released: 1983
- Length: 3:40
- Label: Warlock
- Songwriters: Buddy Kaye; Crystal Smith; Hugo Montenegro; Marlon Williams
- Producer: Ben Liebrand

Dimples D. singles chronology
"Sucker DJ" (1983)	"I Can't Wait" (1991)

"Sucker DJ" (also known as "Sucker DJ's (I Will Survive)", or "Sucker DJ (A Witch for Love)") is a song by American rapper Dimples D. It was written by Buddy Kaye, Crystal Smith, Hugo Montenegro and Marlon Williams. It was originally released in 1983 by Party Time Records, without any initial success on music charts.

In 1990, Dutch DJ and producer Ben Liebrand remixed the song, including a sample of the theme tune of American sitcom I Dream of Jeannie, written by Montenegro and Kaye. After its re-release, the song became a hit in Europe, where it reached the top 10 in the Netherlands and number 17 in the United Kingdom. In Australia and New Zealand, it reached numbers one and two, respectively.

== Background and development ==
"Sucker DJ" was originally written and produced by American rapper and record producer Marley Marl in 1983 for then-newcomer Crystal Smith, who released it under the pseudonym Dimples D. under Party Time Records, unsuccessfully, to mainstream pop communities. In 1990, Dutch DJ Ben Liebrand created a remix of the song entitled "Genie Mix": for the new version, Liebrand used as a basis a sample of the theme music of the sitcom I Dream of Jeannie, written by Hugo Montenegro.

== Commercial performance ==
Following the release of the remix, the song achieved success in various countries. In Europe, it reached number eight in the Netherlands, number 10 in Austria, number 16 in Germany, and number 17 on the UK Singles Chart. In Oceania, it topped the Australian Singles Chart and peaked at number two in New Zealand. Dimples D.'s subsequent singles did not match "Sucker DJ"'s results, making the song a one-hit wonder; she retired from the stage a few years later.

== Charts ==
=== Weekly charts ===
Weekly chart performance for "Sucker DJ (A Witch for Love)"
Chart (1990–1991)	Peak position
Australia (ARIA)	1
Austria (Ö3 Austria Top 40)	10
Belgium (Ultratop 50 Flanders)	25
Europe (Eurochart Hot 100)	55
Germany (GfK)	16
Netherlands (Dutch Top 40)	14
Netherlands (Single Top 100)	8
New Zealand (Recorded Music NZ)	2
Spain (AFYVE)	20
UK Singles (Official Charts)	17
UK Indie (Music Week)	1

=== Year-end charts ===
Year-end chart performance for "Sucker DJ (A Witch for Love)"
Chart (1991)	Position
Australia (ARIA)	27
Germany (Media Control)	58
Italy (Musica e dischi)	87
New Zealand (RIANZ)	18

== Certifications ==
Certifications and sales for "Sucker DJ (A Witch for Love)"
Region	Certification	Certified units/sales
Australia (ARIA)	Gold	35,000^{^}
^{^} Shipments figures based on certification alone.
