= Happy Children =

Happy Children may refer to:

- Happy Children (album), a 1973 album by Osibisa, or the title song
- "Happy Children" (song), a 1983 song by P. Lion
