= Dolce Vita (Ryan Paris song) =

1983 single by Ryan Paris

Single by Ryan Paris

from the album Ryan Paris
- B-side: "Dolce Vita" (Instrumental)
- Released: 1983
- Genre: Italo disco; synth-pop
- Length: 3:48 (album version); 4:28 (single version)
- Label: Discomagic
- Songwriters: Gazebo; Pierluigi Giombini
- Producer: Pierluigi Giombini

Ryan Paris singles chronology
"Dolce Vita" (1983)	"Fall in Love" (1984)

Music video
- "Dolce Vita" on YouTube

"Dolce Vita" is the debut single by Italian singer Ryan Paris, released in 1983, on the Discomagic Records label.

== Background ==
Interviewed for the book Europe's Stars of '80s Dance Pop Vol. 2, composer Pierluigi Giombini explained the evolution of the song:

It was Gazebo who suggested I should write a song inspired by the title of the famous film. [...] So I began to work on it right away, starting with the bass line on the Minimoog, and then I wrote the melody on top of that. Later, Gazebo wrote the lyrics. [...] I did the arrangement in a couple of days and did the vocals and mix-down in another three days. The synths were basically the same - Minimoog, OB-8, ARP Odyssey and the Oberheim DMX drum machine. We also used our real hands over the snare.

Interviewed in 2007, Paris described the background to the recording of the song:

I remained folgorated [lit. electrocuted, fig. dazzled, struck (by lightning)] by the sounds and the melodies of Giombini and I said to him: "I will bring you one of my English songs". That night I composed a new song and three days later I presented it to Giombini who loved the song. We worked on my song two times and one day Giombini told me: "I wrote a song for you, but it is not a rock song". When I heard the song I really made a big jump because it was very nice.

The Arts Desk referred to the construction of the "influential synth intro" of 1981's "Souvenir" by Orchestral Manoeuvres in the Dark, as "...later heavily flavouring Ryan Paris's Euro-gorgonzola hit 'Dolce Vita'."

== Reception ==
Italian writer Rocco Bargioni in his book In Pista! defined the song "a classic 1980s-style Italo disco radio track" and Ryan Paris "one of the most successful projects from Severo Lombardoni’s legendary Discomagic label". He also added that producer Pierluigi Giombini "has always had an eye for the international market".

== Music video ==
The music video was filmed on-location in Paris. Ryan Paris is near the statue of Marshal Joffre at the Champ de Mars, and on the Quai du Louvre, with the Pont Neuf in the background.

== Track listing and formats ==
- Italian 7-inch single

A. "Dolce Vita" (vocal) – 4:28
B. "Dolce Vita" (instrumental) – 4:09

- Italian 12-inch single

A. "Dolce Vita" (vocal) – 7:33
B. "Dolce Vita" (instrumental) – 7:55

- German 7-inch single

A. "Dolce Vita, Part I" (vocal) – 3:59
B. "Dolce Vita, Part II" (instrumental) – 2:48

- German 12-inch maxi-single

A. "Dolce Vita, Part I" (vocal) – 7:33
B. "Dolce Vita, Part II" (instrumental) – 8:37

== Credits and personnel ==
- Ryan Paris – vocals
- Gazebo – songwriter
- Pierluigi Giombini – songwriter, producer, arranger

Credits and personnel adapted from the Ryan Paris album and 7-inch single liner notes.

== Charts ==
=== Weekly charts ===
Weekly chart performance for "Dolce Vita"
Chart (1983–1984)	Peak position
Argentina (Prensario)	1
Australia (Kent Music Report)	85
Austria (Ö3 Austria Top 40)	2
Belgium (Ultratop 50 Flanders)	1
Denmark (IFPI)	1
Finland (Suomen virallinen lista)	4
Italy (Musica e dischi)	9
Ireland (IRMA)	2
Netherlands (Dutch Top 40)	1
Netherlands (Single Top 100)	1
Norway (VG-lista)	2
Spain (AFYVE)	1
South Africa (Springbok Radio)	3
Sweden (Sverigetopplistan)	2
Switzerland (Schweizer Hitparade)	3
UK Singles (Official Charts)	5
Uruguay (UPI)	3
West Germany (GfK)	3

Weekly chart performance for "Dolce Vita"
Chart (2023)	Peak position
Hungary (Single Top 40)	34

=== Year-end charts ===
Year-end chart performance for "Dolce Vita"
Chart (1983)	Position
Austria (Ö3 Austria Top 40)	20
Belgium (Ultratop 50 Flanders)	9
France (SNEP)	27
Netherlands (Dutch Top 40)	19
Netherlands (Single Top 100)	19
West Germany (Official German Charts)	25

== See also ==
- List of number-one hits of 1983 (Flanders)
- List of European number-one hits of 1983
- List of Dutch Top 40 number-one singles of 1983
- List of number-one singles of 1983 (Spain)

== Bibliography ==
- Arena, James (2018). Europe's Stars of '80s Dance Pop Vol. 2: 33 International Hitmakers Discuss Their Careers. BookBaby. ISBN 9781543923131.
