= I Want You (Gary Low song) =

1983 single by Gary Low

Single by Gary Low

from the album Go On
- B-side: "I Want You (Instrumental)"
- Released: 1983
- Genre: Synth-pop
- Length: 3:38
- Label: CAT
- Songwriters: Gary Low; Paul Micioni; Massimiliano Di Carlo; Robert Masala
- Producers: Paul Micioni; Peter Micioni

Gary Low singles chronology
"You Are a Danger" (1982)	"I Want You" (1983)	"Forever, Tonight and All My Life" (1983)

"I Want You" is a song by Italian singer-songwriter Gary Low from his debut studio album, Go On (1983). It was a hit in Spain, reaching No. 4 on the Spanish chart. In Germany, the song made the top 40, peaking at No. 37. In the UK, the song reached No. 52. "I Want You" is one of Low's most popular songs, alongside his 1982 debut hit "You Are a Danger" and 1984's "La Colegiala".

== Track listing and formats ==
- Italian 7-inch single

A. "I Want You" (Vocal) – 3:38
B. "I Want You" (Instrumental) – 4:20

== Charts ==
Weekly chart performance for "I Want You"
Chart (1983)	Peak position
Spain (AFYVE)	4
UK Singles (Official Charts)	52
West Germany (GfK)	37

== Certifications and sales ==
Certifications and sales for "I Want You"
Region	Certification	Certified units/sales
Spain (Promusicae)	Gold	25,000^{^}
^{^} Shipments figures based on certification alone.

== Samples ==
"I Want You" has been sampled on several songs such as "How We Are" by Dimitri & Tom (2001), "In My Eyes" by Sinema (2002), "The Beach" by Miss Kittin & The Hacker (2003), and on "Feel It All Around" by Washed Out (2009) which was used as the opening theme song of the television series Portlandia.

== Appearances in media ==
"I Want You" can be heard during a scene in the 1985 VIVA film Working Boys which stars Tito, Vic & Joey and Herbert Bautista.
