= P. Lion =

Italian Italo disco singer and musician (born 1959)

- Born: Pietro Paolo Pelandi; 29 June 1959 (age 67); Alzano Lombardo, Lombardy, Italy
- Occupations: Singer; songwriter; musician; producer
- Years active: 1983–present
- Children: Edoardo
- Musical career
- Genres: Italo disco
- Instruments: Vocals; keyboards
- Labels: Carrere; Discomagic

Pietro Paolo Pelandi (born 29 June 1959), known by his stage name P. Lion, is an Italian singer, songwriter, musician and producer.

== Biography ==
Pelandi took the name of "P. Lion" because of the three "P"s in his name and because the symbol of his family is a lion. (He is of noble descendance, his father being the count of Alzano Lombardo). He started to play the piano and write his own music at a young age.

== Career ==
P. Lion's achieved international fame with his two hits "Happy Children" (1983, produced by Davide Zambelli of the band Scotch) and "Dream" (1984). "Dream" was the theme of the French TV and radio chart show Top 50 from 1984 to 1993, and "Happy Children" was remixed to become the new theme of the French Top 50 since 2000.

P. Lion's first album Springtime was released in 1984. He contributed significantly to its realization, writing music and lyrics for all the songs, working on the arrangements with Zambelli and Walter Verdi, co-producing and playing keyboards.

After his first album, P. Lion signed to the Milan label Discomagic Records, the biggest dance label in Italy at the time. There, he produced his own singles such as "Believe Me" and "Under the Moon" with Durium. In 1995, he released A Step in the Right Way, an album with FMA and the publisher Allione. He collaborated as arranger on some productions by Betty Villani and Tony Sheridan.

== Discography ==
=== Albums ===
- Springtime (1984)
- A Step in the Right Way... (1995)

=== Singles ===
- "Happy Children" (1984), Carrere – Switzerland #11, Germany #15, Netherlands #15, Belgium #5, Spain #14
- "Dream" (1984), Carrere – Germany #24, France #25
- "Reggae Radio" (1984), Carrere
- "Believe Me" (1985), Durium
- "Under the Moon" (1986), Durium
- "You'll Never Break My Heart" (1987), Durium
- "Burn in His Hand" (1991), P.Lion Production
- "A Salty Dog" (2014), P.Lion project
- "Sea So Blue" (2014), P.Lion project
- "MONeY" (2015), PLP
- "Remember" (2015), PLP
- "Happy Children (2018)" (2018), PLP
- "Tell Me" (2025), PLP
