= Masterpiece (Gazebo song) =

1982 single by Gazebo

Single by Gazebo

from the album Gazebo
- B-side: "Masterpiece (Instrumental)"
- Released: 1982
- Genre: Italo disco
- Length: 4:05 (album version); 4:10 (single version)
- Label: Baby
- Songwriters: Gazebo; Pierluigi Giombini; Paul Micioni
- Producers: Paul Micioni; Peter Micioni; Roberto Fusar Poli

Gazebo singles chronology
"Masterpiece" (1982)	"I Like Chopin" (1983)

Music video
- "Gazebo - Masterpiece (Classic)" on YouTube

"Masterpiece" is the debut single by Italian singer Gazebo, released in 1982, under the label Baby Records. The song was written by Mazzolini, Paul Micioni and Pierluigi Giombini, and produced by Paul and Peter Micioni and Roberto Fusar Poli. It reached the top 10 in Italy, peaking at No. 2. The song also charted in Switzerland and West Germany, peaking at No. 5 and No. 35, respectively.

== Track listing and formats ==
- Italian 7-inch single

A. "Masterpiece" – 4:10
B. "Masterpiece" (Instrumental) – 4:30

- Italian 12-inch single

A. "Masterpiece" – 9:30
B. "Masterpiece" (Instrumental) – 12:45

== Credits and personnel ==
- Gazebo – songwriter, vocals, arranger
- Pierluigi Giombini – songwriter, arranger, programming
- Paul Micioni – songwriter, producer
- Peter Micioni – producer
- Roberto Fusar Poli – producer
- Massimiliano Di Carlo – mixing

Credits and personnel adapted from the Gazebo album and 7-inch single liner notes.

== Charts ==
Weekly chart performance for "Masterpiece"
Chart (1982–1983)	Peak position
Italy (Musica e dischi)	2
Switzerland (Schweizer Hitparade)	5
West Germany (GfK)	35
