= I Like Chopin =

1983 single by Gazebo

Single by Gazebo

from the album Gazebo
- B-side: "I Like Chopin (Instrumental)"
- Released: 4 September 1983
- Genre: Italo disco
- Length: 7:40 (album version); 4:09 (single version)
- Label: Baby
- Songwriters: Gazebo; Pierluigi Giombini
- Producer: Pierluigi Giombini

Gazebo singles chronology
"Masterpiece" (1982)	"I Like Chopin" (1983)	"Love in Your Eyes" (1983)

Music video
- "I Like Chopin" on YouTube

"I Like Chopin" is a song by Italian singer-songwriter Gazebo from his debut studio album, Gazebo (1983). It peaked at number one in several European national charts. The music was composed by Pierluigi Giombini (contrary to what the title implies, without themes from Chopin) and the lyrics were written by Gazebo.

== Track listing and formats ==
- Italian 7-inch single

A. "I Like Chopin" – 4:09
B. "I Like Chopin" (Instrumental) – 4:20

- German 12-inch maxi-single

A. "I Like Chopin" – 7:40
B. "I Like Chopin" (Instrumental) – 7:55

== Credits and personnel ==
- Gazebo – songwriter, vocals
- Pierluigi Giombini – songwriter, producer, arranger, programming
- Gianpaolo Bresciani – mixing

Credits and personnel adapted from the Gazebo album and 7-inch single liner notes.

== Charts ==
=== Weekly charts ===
Weekly chart performance for "I Like Chopin"
Chart (1983–1984)	Peak position
Argentina (CAPIF)	5
Austria (Ö3 Austria Top 40)	1
Belgium (Ultratop 50 Flanders)	3
Denmark (IFPI)	1
Finland (Suomen virallinen lista)	1
Italy (Musica e dischi)	2
Japan (Oricon Singles Chart)	9
Netherlands (Dutch Top 40)	5
Netherlands (Single Top 100)	7
Portugal (AFP)	1
Spain (AFYVE)	1
Switzerland (Schweizer Hitparade)	1
Uruguay (CUD)	2
West Germany (GfK)	1

Weekly chart performance for "I Like Chopin"
Chart (2021–2025)	Peak position
Hungary (Single Top 40)	19
Poland (Polish Airplay Top 100)	49

=== Year-end charts ===
Year-end chart performance for "I Like Chopin"
Chart (1983)	Position
Austria (Ö3 Austria Top 40)	5
Belgium (Ultratop 50 Flanders)	41
France (SNEP)	32
Netherlands (Dutch Top 40)	38
Netherlands (Single Top 100)	52
Switzerland (Schweizer Hitparade)	3
West Germany (Official German Charts)	13

== Certifications and sales ==
Certifications and sales for "I Like Chopin"
Region	Certification	Certified units/sales
Germany (BVMI)	Gold	500,000^{^}
Italy (FIMI) since 2009	Gold	35,000^{‡}
^{^} Shipments figures based on certification alone.^{‡} Sales+streaming figures based on certification alone.

== Asami Kobayashi version ==
In 1984, Japanese singer and actress Asami Kobayashi recorded a Japanese-language cover of the song titled "Amaoto wa Chopin no Shirabe" (Japanese: 雨音はショパンの調べ; "The Sound of Rain is Chopin's Music"), with lyrics by Yumi Matsutoya. The song peaked at the top of the Oricon Singles Chart for three weeks.

== Serg Minaev version ==
In 1985, the Soviet singer and musician Serg Minaev recorded a Russian-language version of the composition (called "Chopin"), which was included in the magnetic album Collage.

== Grasshopper version ==
In 1992, Hong Kong Cantopop group Grasshopper recorded a Cantonese cover of the song titled "再見 Rainy Days" ("Goodbye Rainy Days"), with lyrics by Hong Kong singer and songwriter Calvin Choy. A Mandarin version was published after.

== See also ==
- Lists of number-one singles (Austria)
- List of number-one hits of 1983 (Germany)
- List of number-one singles of 1983 (Spain)
- List of number-one singles of the 1980s (Switzerland)
