= Music in Rome =

Music in the modern city of Rome, Italy

The culture of music in Rome is intensely active. The venues for live music include:

- Teatro dell'Opera di Roma, is a theater built in the 1880s in the "building boom" to expand the capital of the new nation-state of Italy. The theater has hosted the premieres of many famous works, including Tosca and Cavalleria rusticana, and other memorable events such as Visconti's staging of The Marriage of Figaro. The theater has a permanent orchestra, choir and ballet company, and today also includes a multimedia historical archive.
- The Accademia Nazionale di Santa Cecilia, an academy authorized by Pope Gregory XIII in 1566, has remained one of the most prestigious musical organizations in the world.
  - The Orchestra dell'Accademia Nazionale di Santa Cecilia is a permanent orchestra associated with the academy, and over the years has found a home in various auditoriums in the city, the most recent move (2003) being to the premises of the Parco della Musica, a vast new auditorium complex. The full orchestra and the Santa Cecilia chamber ensembles perform 200 concerts per year in Rome.
- The Accademia Filarmonica Romana performs at the Teatro Olimpico and has, besides an active concert season, a long history of promoting music education and community and amateur music.
- Lazio Symphony orchestra performs in Rome as well as elsewhere in the region of Lazio.
- The Youth Symphony of Rome
- Parco della Musica opened in 2002 as a large musical complex featuring three separate auditoriums. It is located between the Olympic Village and the Parioli Quarter. It hosts an ongoing series of classical, popular, and jazz music events, featuring national as well as international musicians and groups.
- The Aula Magna of the Sapienza University sponsors an active musical season.

The city of Rome has the National Museum of Musical Instruments, one of the largest such institutions in the world.

Rome is considered the jazz capital of Italy, with an average of 350 jazz concerts scheduled each month. The city also plays host to several jazz festivals each year, including the Roma Jazz Festival, Casa del Jazz Festival, and the Villa Celimontana Jazz Festival.

== See also ==
- Music of Lazio
