= Tony Scott (rapper) =

Dutch rapper (1971–2026)

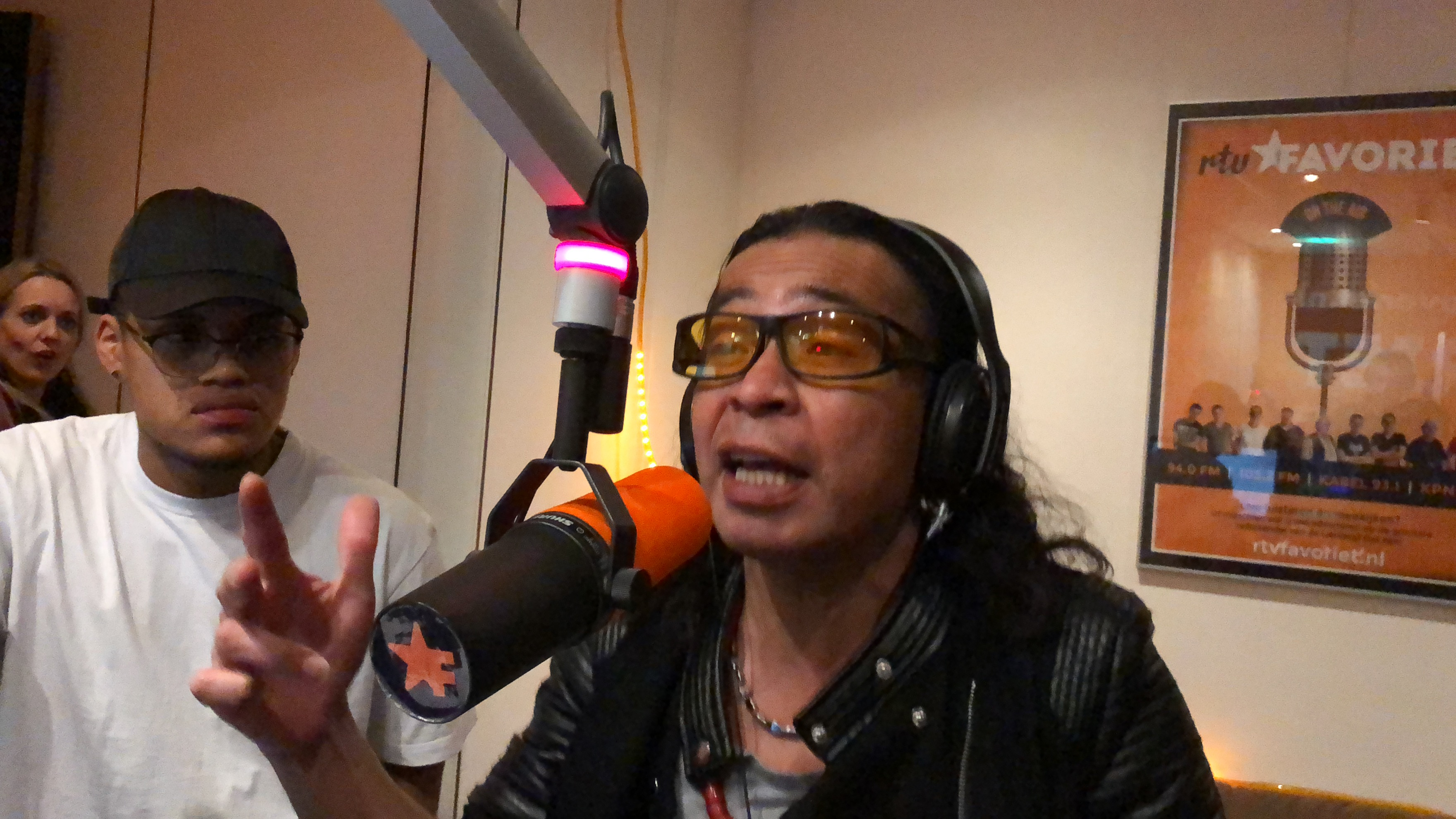
- Scott in 2017

Background information
- Born: Peter van den Bosch; 2 October 1971; Diitabiki, Suriname
- Died: 6 August 2026 (aged 54) Weesp, Netherlands
- Genres: Hip hop; hip house
- Occupations: Rapper; songwriter; musician
- Years active: 1988–2016

Peter van den Bosch (2 October 1971 – 6 August 2026), better known as Tony Scott, was a Dutch rapper and musician of Surinamese descent. He became internationally known for his hip house music.

== Life and career ==
Tony Scott was a Kalina Amerindian who was born in Suriname. He immigrated with his parents to Amsterdam, Netherlands at a young age. As a thirteen-year-old, he became a member of an electric boogie crew, followed by joining the beatboxing group 2-Tuff E-nuff. After he had rapped in a jingle for the radio station where his brother was working, the 16-year-old Scott was offered a contract by the owner of the Dutch record label Rhythm. His first single that was released was "Pick Up the Pieces", a remake cover of the Average White Band song. Even though the single did not become a commercial success, it ensured that he could perform a lot.

In 1989, he released his next single, a double A-side with the songs "That's How I'm Living" and "The Chief". The latter song was written as an ode to his indigenous Kalina heritage. The single was a success in the Netherlands, but also received attention in the United Kingdom and the United States. In the same year, he released his first album The Chief, with his regular producer Fabian Lenssen. The album was released as That's How I'm Living in the United States, because he was better known for that song with the same name. It contained twelve hip house/hardcore rap tracks.

In 1990, Scott released the single "Get Into It", which became his most successful song. He was invited to perform at the New Music Seminar in New York. Even before his trip to this music fair, the rapper had another hit, "Gangster Boogie". In the same year, he released the single "Move to the Big Band" with Ben Liebrand.

Afterwards, Scott released several singles and changed his sound numerous times, but none of his products equaled the success of the first few singles. In 1991, he released his second album Expressions from the Soul and his third album Chameleon was released in 1993. In 1994, Scott and Fabian Lenssen wrote the single "Gangsterdam" for the Dutch children's choir Kinderen voor Kinderen. In 1996, he released a theme song for the American football team Amsterdam Admirals.

In 2000, Scott became a music teacher in Amsterdam. In 2015, he was diagnosed with multiple sclerosis. He died as a result of this disease on 6 August 2026, at the age of 54.

== Discography ==
Albums

- The Chief (1990)
- Expressions from the Soul (1991)
- Chameleon (1993)
