= Fabian Lenssen =

Dutch music produced, songwriter and remixer

- Genres: Electronic, pop, urban

Fabian Lenssen is a Dutch music producer, songwriter and remixer. He began producing and writing Electronic, Pop and Urban music since the late 1980s, and has produced, written and remixed for internationally known musicians, including Michael Jackson, David Guetta, Madonna, R3hab, Rihanna, Jennifer Lopez, Nervo, Lady Gaga, Flo Rida, Katy Perry, LMFAO, Fedde le Grand, Moby, Enrique Iglesias, Pitull, Diddy, Sidney Samson, Akon, Skylar Grey, Havana Brown, Jean Roch, Calvin Harris, Sander van Doorn, T-Pain, and Benny Benassi.

== Musical beginnings ==
Lenssen started producing music as a teenager. He worked with several artists including Dutch Hip Hop performer Tony Scott, and produced several chart topping single hits, including “The Chief”, “Get In To It”, “Love Let Love" and a number of albums, including Chameleon in 1993. He produced Pop, Hip Hop, Urban, and other music genres.

In mid-2004, Lenssen moved into Electronic Dance Music and for several years was part of the production team that created the "Dirty Dutch" sound for Dj Chuckie. Lenssen started producing music for DJ R3hab, creating his “Chainsaw” sound.

== Production and recording with other artists ==
Fabian Lenssen has produced and written music for well-known recording artists and DJs. He has also won major awards like BUMA and has recently signed a deal with Talpa music.

In 2013, Lenssen continued to produce EDM and POP music through his company called “The Creed”.
