= Giancarlo Meo =

Italian record producer and entrepreneur

Giancarlo Meo is an Italian record producer and entrepreneur. He started his career very young, contributing to the Italo disco scene.

He founded Banana Records yielding successful artists like Easy Going and Vivien Vee. He also produced Gioca Jouer, the title song of the Sanremo Music Festival 1981.

In the early '90s, he created the brand Hit Mania, combined with the launch of a series of compilations which featured several famous European artists such as Lùnapop, Haiducii (who reached the top of the European charts with "Dragostea Din Tei"), the duo Zero, the band Aventura (with their single "Obsesión"), and Crazy Frog.

He is president of a group of companies that include Universe SpA and Global Mania Entertainment Ltd., which have offices in Rome.
