= Happy Children (song) =

1983 single by P. Lion

Single by P. Lion

from the album Springtime
- B-side: "Happy Children (Instrumental"
- Released: September 1983
- Genre: Italo disco
- Length: 3:20
- Label: Discomagic
- Songwriter: P. Lion
- Producer: David Zambelli

P. Lion singles chronology
| "Happy Children" (1983) | "Dream" (1984) |

Audio video
- "Happy Children" on YouTube

"Happy Children" is the debut single by Italian singer P. Lion, released in September 1983, under the label Discomagic Records.

== Track listing and formats ==
- Italian 7-inch single

A. "Happy Children" (Vocal) – 3:20
B. "Happy Children" (Instrumental) – 3:30

- Italian 12-inch single

A. "Happy Children" (Vocal) – 6:30
B. "Happy Children" (Instrumental) – 6:30

- German 7-inch single

A. "Happy Children" – 3:40
B. "Happy Children" (Instrumental) – 3:30

- German 12-inch maxi-single

A. "Happy Children" (Vocal) – 5:58
B. "Happy Children" (Instrumental) – 6:31

== Credits and personnel ==
- P. Lion – songwriter, vocals
- David Zambelli – producer
- Roberto Turatti – mixing
- Miki Chieregato – mixing
- Walter Verdi – arranger

Credits and personnel adapted from the Springtime album and 7-inch single liner notes.

== Charts ==
=== Weekly charts ===
Weekly chart performance for "Happy Children"
| Chart (1984) | Peak position |
|---|---|
| Belgium (Ultratop 50 Flanders) | 5 |
| Netherlands (Dutch Top 40) | 11 |
| Netherlands (Single Top 100) | 15 |
| Spain (AFYVE) | 14 |
| Switzerland (Schweizer Hitparade) | 11 |
| West Germany (GfK) | 15 |

=== Year-end charts ===
Year-end chart performance for "Happy Children"
| Chart (1984) | Position |
|---|---|
| Belgium (Ultratop 50 Flanders) | 43 |
| France (SNEP) | 54 |
| West Germany (Official German Charts) | 54 |
