= Dimples D. =

American rapper

Crystal Smith, better known by her stage name Dimples D., is an American rapper.

== Sucker DJ ==
Dimples D. was selected as the vocalist for a track by hip-hop producer Marley Marl entitled "Sucker DJ's (I Will Survive)", released on Party Time Records in 1983. "Sucker DJ's" was written by Crystal Smith / Williams / Kaye / Montenegro.

The song—an answer song to Run-D.M.C.'s "Sucker M.C.s (Krush-Groove 1)"—did not sell in quantity upon its first release, but Ben Liebrand reworked the song in 1990, including a sample of the theme song from the American sitcom I Dream of Jeannie. Upon re-release, the song went to #1 in Australia, #17 in the UK singles chart, and charted in many countries in Europe.

== Discography ==
=== Albums ===
List of albums, with selected details
Title	Details
Dimples & Spice	Released: 1991; Format: CD, LP, CS; Label: Strictly Dance

=== Singles ===
List of singles, with selected chart positions
Year	Title	Peak positions							Album
Year	Title	AUS	AUT	BEL (FL)	GER	NED	NZ	UK	Album
1983	"Sucker DJ's (I Will Survive)" (US only)	—	—	—	—	—	—	—	single only
1990	"Sucker DJ (A Witch for Love)" (Ben Liebrand remix)	1	10	25	16	8	2	17	Dimples & Spice
1991	"I Can't Wait"	—	—	—	—	—	—	—	Dimples & Spice
1991	"Sisters Keep on Doin' It" (with Lady Spice)	116	—	—	—	—	—	—	Dimples & Spice
"—" denotes releases that did not chart or were not released.
