= Vivien Vee =

Italian singer

Viviana Andreattini (born 2 May 1960), known under the stage name of Vivien Vee, is a retired Italian singer.

== Life and career ==
Born in Trieste, Vee debuted in 1979 as an electronic disco project produced by Claudio Simonetti and Giancarlo Meo.

Her song "Give Me a Break" became a minor hit in the American dance charts. The song "Higher" peaked at No. 36 in the Italian Chart. Another song of hers, "Remember", was featured in the 2005 video game The Warriors. She released her last single in 1989.

Between 1982 and 1984, she posed semi-nude in men's magazines such as Playmen, Blitz, and the Italian edition of Playboy.

== Discography ==
=== Albums ===
- 1979: Vivien Vee
- 1979: Give Me a Break
- 1983: With Vivien Vee

=== Selected singles ===
- 1979: "Give Me a Break"
- 1979: "Remember"
- 1981: "Pick Up"
- 1983: "Just For Me"
- 1983: "Higher"
- 1984: "Americano"
- 1987: "Heartbeat"
- 1989: "Cross My Heart"
