= You Are a Danger =

Single by Gary Low

from the album Grandes Éxitos
- B-side: "You Are a Danger" (Instrumental)
- Released: 1982
- Genre: Italo disco
- Length: 8:37
- Label: Il Discotto; Baby Records
- Songwriters: Paul Micioni, Pierluigi Giombini
- Producers: Paul Micioni, Peter Micioni

Gary Low singles chronology
"You Are a Danger" (1982)	"I Want You" (1983)

"You Are a Danger" is the debut single by Italo disco singer Gary Low, released in 1982. It was a hit in several countries across Europe, with its biggest success in Spain, where it reached number one.

The song did not initially appear on Low's 1983 debut album Go On, but was included the following year on the Spanish release Grandes Éxitos on the Hispavox label.

== Charts ==
Chart (1982–83)	Peak position
Belgium (Ultratop 50 Flanders)	25
Netherlands (Single Top 100)	42
Italy (Musica e dischi)	8
Spain (Spanish Singles Chart)	1
Switzerland (Schweizer Hitparade)	7
