= Music of Lazio =

Lazio is a region in central Italy that includes the city and province of Rome and the other provinces of Frosinone, Latina, Rieti, and Viterbo. Generally speaking, the Lazio Symphony, which has its base in Rome, itself, "plays the provinces," so to speak, and puts on regular concerts throughout Latium. Other than that, the provinces offer:

- Frosinone: this is the historic region that recalls the presence of Cicero and Pope Boniface VIII. It is also the site of the abbey of Monte Cassino famed as the first monastery in the western monastic tradition and as the home of Pope Gregory the Great, codifier of the chants that bear his name. Frosinone also hosts the Licinio Refice music conservatory, one of the largest in Italy, with 1000 students and about 100 faculties;
- Latina: there is a new auditorium such as the Teatro comunale and the new Pontino music festival; Latina is as well the site of the annual International Music Campus, a music and theater festival;
- Rieti: The most proment musical venue in Rieti is the Teatro Flavio Vespasiano.
- Viterbo: the city hosts an annual Baroque music festival and sponsors a prominent Youth Symphony Orchestra.

== Folk tradition ==
Latium shares the ottava rima folk tradition with nearby Tuscany and Abruzzo. Ottava rima (also poeti contadini) is a kind of vocal music that can be competitive and improvised, thoughtful, articulate and political, and is sometimes based on the work of Ariosto, Dante and Homer.

Latium is also home to the saltarello, a 4/4 dance that is most closely associated with Alta Sabina.

The folk music of Latium was recorded as part of the Italian roots revival in the 1960s, by groups like Canzoniere del Lazio.
