= Baby Jane (Rod Stewart song) =

Single by Rod Stewart

from the album Body Wishes
- B-side: "Ready Now"
- Released: 27 May 1983
- Genre: Pop rock; synth-pop; new pop
- Length: 4:45
- Label: Warner Bros.
- Songwriters: Rod Stewart; Jay Davis
- Producers: Rod Stewart and Tom Dowd; Jim Cregan and George Tutko (co-producers)

Rod Stewart singles chronology
"Tora, Tora, Tora (Out with the Boys)" (1982)	"Baby Jane" (1983)	"What Am I Gonna Do (I'm So in Love with You)" (1983)

"Baby Jane" is a 1983 song by British singer Rod Stewart, written by Stewart and Jay Davis. It was released as the lead single from his twelfth studio album, Body Wishes. Produced by Stewart, Tom Dowd, George Cutko and Jim Cregan, it was his most successful single since "Da Ya Think I'm Sexy?" in 1978, peaking at No. 1 in the UK (his last number one single to date) remaining at the top of the chart for three weeks. In the United States, the song was also a hit, peaking at No. 14 on the Billboard Hot 100 chart.

== Charts ==
=== Weekly charts ===
Chart (1983)	Peak position
Australia (Kent Music Report)	10
Austria (Ö3 Austria Top 40)	3
Belgium (Ultratop 50 Flanders)	1
Canada Top Singles (RPM)	13
Europe (European Hot 100 Singles)	1
France (IFOP)	2
Ireland (IRMA)	1
Israel (Kol Yisrael)	1
Netherlands (Single Top 100)	9
New Zealand (Recorded Music NZ)	14
Norway (VG-lista)	10
South Africa (Springbok Radio)	1
Spain (AFYVE)	1
Sweden (Sverigetopplistan)	3
Switzerland (Schweizer Hitparade)	2
UK Singles (Official Charts)	1
US Billboard Hot 100	14
US Dance/Disco Top 80 (Billboard)	47
US Cash Box Top 100 Singles	18
West Germany (GfK)	1
Zimbabwe (ZIMA)	3

=== Year-end charts ===
Chart (1983)	Position
Australia (Kent Music Report)	80
Belgium (Ultratop 50 Flanders)	17
Canada Top Singles (RPM)	86
France (IFOP)	30
Netherlands (Dutch Top 40)	50
Netherlands (Single Top 100)	85
South Africa (Springbok Radio)	7
Switzerland (Schweizer Hitparade)	14
UK Singles (Official Charts)	21
West Germany (Media Control)	9

== Certifications and sales ==
Region	Certification	Certified units/sales
France (SNEP)	Gold	500,000^{*}
United Kingdom (BPI)	Silver	250,000^{^}
^{*} Sales figures based on certification alone.^{^} Shipments figures based on certification alone.

== See also ==
- List of European number-one hits of 1983
- List of number-one hits of 1983 (Germany)
- List of number-one singles of 1983 (Ireland)
- List of number-one singles of 1983 (Spain)
- List of UK singles chart number ones of the 1980s
