= Garry Lowe =

Australian rules footballer

Personal information
- Born: 31 December 1953 (age 72); Footscray
- Original team: Essendon District League: EBSJ
- Height: 185 cm (6 ft 1 in)
- Weight: 82 kg (181 lb)
- Position: Defender

Playing career^{1}
Years	Club	Games (Goals)
1974	Essendon	8 (0)
- ^{1} Playing statistics correct to the end of 1974.

Career highlights
- 2nd Best & Fairest Essendon U19 behind his twin brother Peter, equal 3rd VFL Reserve Grade Best & Fairest 1975, Best 1st year player, Northcote Football Club 1976.

Garry Lowe (born 31 December 1953) is a former Australian rules footballer who played with Essendon in the Victorian Football League (VFL). He later played 2 seasons for Northcote in the VFA before retiring due to reoccurring leg injuries in 1977 at the age of 24. Garry suffered a massive heart attack at the age of 66 in 2019, which he survived.
