= Paul and Peter Micioni =

Italian DJs, musicians and record producers

Paolo "Paul" Micioni (born 3 March 1956) and Pietro "Peter" Micioni (born 18 February 1963) are an Italian duo of DJs, musicians and record producers.

== Career ==
Born in Rome, the Micioni brothers started their career as DJs in the 1970s, Paul in 1973 and Peter in 1977. At the end of the decade, Paolo Micioni was noticed by Claudio Simonetti in the disco club where he was resident DJ, the Easy Going, and then Simonetti together with Giancarlo Meo decided to produce him in a musical project named after the club, Easy Going, achieving a significant success with the song "Baby I Love You". Following Paolo's production of his brother's 1980 debut single "Driving on Broadway", in late 1981 the two brothers formed the group Traks, mainly active in recording dance versions of 1960s and 1970s rock songs, notably a successful rendition of The Doobie Brothers' hit "Long Train Runnin'".

After producing several singles for Best Records, including the hits "Masterpiece" by Gazebo and "Nightime Lady" by Mike Francis, Micionis founded their own label, Cat Records, producing several Francis and Gary Low hits. In later years they founded a recording studio, Gimmick, and produced works by Banco del Mutuo Soccorso, Tiromancino, Marina Rei, Niccolò Fabi.
