= Pierluigi Giombini =

Italian songwriter and record producer (born 1956)

Pierluigi Giombini (born 11 December 1956 in Rome) is an Italian songwriter and record producer. He was born in a family of musicians: his father Marcello Giombini was a composer of secular music and film music as well as being interested in electronic music, while his grandfather was a music professor who specialized in the oboe and played in the Santa Cecilia orchestra. Giombini therefore had been introduced at an early age to the classics and progressed to study piano and composition at the conservatory. While he was studying classical music at the Conservatory in Rome, he also listened to 1970s progressive rock groups; Emerson, Lake & Palmer in particular and Wendy Carlos. It was Wendy Carlos' Switched-On Bach records that inspired him to study and create the synth sounds that he later used on his hit records in the 1980s. Even now he still uses hardware and software synths for his current projects such as 'Web'.

Giombini started his career in 1980 collaborating with Natasha King, and got his first hit in 1982 with Gazebo's "Masterpiece". He is better known for composing, arranging and producing Gazebo's international hit "I Like Chopin". Other Italo disco hits penned by Giombini include Ryan Paris' "Dolce Vita", Gary Low's "You Are a Danger" and Gazebo's "Lunatic".
