= Ben Liebrand =

Dutch dance music DJ, remixer and 3D visual artist (born 1960)

- Also known as: The Crystal Palace; Brussel Syndicate; ISCO; Teknikolor; Teqnoh; The Riddler; The World; Goldilox
- Born: 27 September 1960 (age 65); Nijmegen, the Netherlands
- Genres: Disco; dance; house; techno
- Occupations: Remixer; DJ; producer; songwriter; 3D computer; graphic designer
- Years active: 1976–present
- Website: www.liebrand.com

Ben Liebrand (Dutch pronunciation: [bɛn ˈlibrɑnt]; born 27 September 1960) is a Dutch dance music DJ and remixer. He has produced for artists such as Forrest and MC Miker G & DJ Sven and remixed tracks by artists such as Alexander O'Neal, Salt-N-Pepa, Sting, TLC, Fun Fun, Tavares, The Limit, Bill Withers, Frankie Valli & The Four Seasons, Hot Chocolate, Pia Zadora, The Doobie Brothers, The Art Of Noise, Dimples D and Phil Collins. He has also seen success under his own name, a prime example being his remix of Jeff Wayne's "The Eve of the War", which reached number three on the UK Singles Chart in 1989.

His radio show "In the Mix" was the first non-stop mixed show that aired on Dutch National Radio on 2 April 1983. Early listeners were Armin van Buuren, Tiësto (Tijs Verwest), Olav Basoski, DJ Jean, Ferry Corsten and DJ Dano (Daniël Leeflang), who have cited Liebrand as their main reason for entering the music business. "In The Mix" also spawned an annual yearmix with 100+ tracks called "The Grandmix." The first series of Grandmixes aired from 1983 till 1992. There were only two Grandmixes (1988 and 1989) that were released on limited edition CD exclusively for members of the UK Disco Mix Club. The Grandmix 1990 was planned to follow, but was cancelled (after being pressed) due to changes in copyright rules in the UK. The later Grandmixes from 1999 till 2018 were aired and also released on a 3 CD Box by Sony BMG records.

== Music career ==
=== Early history ===
Liebrand began his DJing career in 1976 at the age of 16 with his mobile set-up, "The B. Liebrand Audio Studio", playing parties around his hometown of Nijmegen. Two years later, when he became old enough to frequent nightclubs, he moved from mobile discos to a nightclub residency, playing in "Juicy Lucy" nightclub (1978–1979). At this point, he was still letting one record play into another without beatmixing; however in 1979, he began a residency at "The Kwien" (pronounced 'The Queen') nightclub (1979–1980). During this time, Liebrand learned the art of mixing from Kwien resident Huib Luiten.

At his longest residency to date at "The Keizer Karel" (1980–1988) played a five-hour set each night after the club first opened. He continued DJing with his sister Rita Liebrand, at "The Hippodrome" Hennef, Germany (1990–1995). His last residency was in the club "Disco Inferno" (2000–2004). Ben is still active as a DJ having specialised in doing key-mixing on 4 Pioneer CD players simultaneously.

=== Radio Veronica early years ===
On 1 April 1983, Liebrand was hired by the public broadcasting association Veronica, producing a weekly individual mix show called "In The Mix", which aired on Hilversum 3 (later Radio 3). This one-hour show played at 2 am weekly, and ran from early 1983 to November 1985. From that radio show, regular features such as the "Grandmix", a yearly mix of all important dance tracks of the year, was developed. Taking a full month to organise, mix and record, the first Grandmix was broadcast at the end of 1983, but technical complications almost ended this event before it started. Arriving at the Veronica studio, Liebrand discovered that he had forgotten the second of the two tapes on which the Grandmix '83 was recorded. But he happened to have a tape of a just finished "High Fashion Dance Mix" with him, and it was with that tape that the second part of the Grandmix '83 began. In January 1984, the 'Grandmix '83' was broadcast in its entirety. The name "Grandmix" developed into a trademark event for both Radio Veronica and Liebrand, running until 1992. Ben Liebrand registered the name "Grandmix" also as a trademark.

In 1984, Liebrand also started making shorter remixes for the Friday evening 'Curry & Van Inkel show', later the 'Stenders & Van Inkel show' (both by the same broadcaster and air on the same radio station as mentioned above). His "In the Minimix" was always played at "two records past nine" (twee platen over negen) and formed an important part of the popular radioshow. These minimixes were either three/four track mixes (never exceeding fifteen minutes in total) or remixes of popular chart records at the time.

Many of Liebrand's remixes, released as singles, including Bill Withers "Lovely Day" and Frankie Valli & The Four Seasons "December 1963 (Oh, What a Night)" were premiered as 'minimixes' on this radio show. In the case of Phil Collins "In The Air Tonight," however, the mix was completed and then taken by Liebrand to be part of a mix showcase at the DMC Mixing Championship Finals in London. Liebrand explained "Then I put on my remix of Phil Collins, in front of those three and a half thousand DJ’s. And I told them: "If you want to see this released? Call Virgin first thing tomorrow!" That resulted in Virgin being called by two and a half thousand DJ's, and this got the track signed and released by 1pm the day after" which hit Number 4 in the UK charts.

After producing the final "Grandmix" in 1992, Liebrand felt frustrated with lack of feedback that his mixes were gaining. "You didn’t know what people thought of it. 30 days fulltime working on the Grandmix in December, ten to twelve hours a day mixing. On 31 December it was finished, and the last years when I entered the broadcast studios, everybody was busy doing something else, not really interested, and only the technician who was on duty, sat with me in the broadcast room. I plugged in my gear, pressed play around six o’clock, and after an hour I disconnected it again, and took off. Having sat there for one hour, solely with the technician, it was the biggest anti-climax ever. This could be compared to making a piece of art, walking up to a bridge and throwing it in the river, without knowing the people’s opinions about it."

=== Liebrand Images ===
Liebrand embarked on computer-based 3D renderings and animation work, beginning his own visual company, Liebrand Images in 1991. He was an official Silicon Graphics reseller and instructor for a period of time. He used to work with 3D modelling programs such as Electro GIG and Softimage 3D Extreme. He undertook work such as commercials for clients including the Arcade Compilations CDs, promotional music videos for acts including Atlantic Ocean, 2 Brothers on the 4th Floor and Alan Parsons and visuals for station idents for music TV station TMF. He designs all of his CD covers, labels and video promos himself.

=== Return of The Grandmix ===
In 1997, Liebrand released "Funky Town" and in 1998 negotiations began with Dutch radio station Radio 538 (an offspring of Veronica), the result of which was the re-broadcasting of all the Radio Veronica "Grandmixes" on the last Saturday of the month throughout 1999. The final intention was to broadcast a brand-new "Grandmix" in December 1999, a "MillenniuM-Mix", containing the greatest dance tracks of the century. Liebrand was invited to produce a mid-year summer Grandmix and an end-of-year Grandmix for Radio 538. On 31 December 2001, a three-hour "Grandmix" was broadcast, followed by a "Grandmix Disco Edition" on 23 August that year. "Grandmixes" were broadcast in the summer and end-of-year of 2002 and 2003.

In 2004, Liebrand joined Radio Veronica for a two-hour weekly mix. He makes Grandmixes available in a new format on 3 CDs on his website and has his 'In The Mix' show on Radio Veronica.

Until 2018 Grandmixes were available on CD every year. Due to licensing problems which occurred through changes in the music industry in 2019, there was no Grandmix available on CD in 2019. Instead Liebrand changed the concept to a three-hour (2:59:33) long mix called "Grandmix Decade Edition" which covers more than 250 songs of the years 2010–2019. It was broadcast on Radio 538 and Radio Calletti on 31 December 2019 from 18:00-21:00. Listeners have been very happy with this mix returning to the fast mixing style of the early days of Grandmix free of any licensing blockages using all available material to the artists choice.

== Awards ==
- In 1988 he receives the Best Remixer Award: DMC, chosen by members worldwide, of the Disco Mix Club.
- In 1991 he receives the France Achievement Award 1991 - No. 1 Remixer in the World from the France departement of DMC.
- On 2 November 1992 Ben Liebrand receives the Dutch Achievement Award 1992 for Best Dutch Dance Producer at the Dance Connexion Gala.
- On 19 October 2017 Ben Liebrand was the first to receive the Lifetime Achievement Award at the Nightlife Awards on the Amsterdam Dance Event (ADE).
- On 9 March 2020, for his many years of dedication and contribution to the music industry, he received the Dutch Buma Gouden Harp Award.

== Personal life ==
Liebrand is married to Brenda van Raam. They have two sons and a daughter. Liebrand and his son Sascha released two mix cd's in 2010, which they made together.

In 2010, they moved from their monumental estate Villa Roozenburg in Weurt (Beuningen, Gelderland), The Netherlands to Okotoks in the province of Alberta, Canada. From there he continues with his activities.

== Chronology of Dutch radio appearances ==
- 1983 - 1993 Veronica (through Hilversum 3/Radio 3) - Radio programs
- 1983 - 1985: "In The Mix" First non-stop mixed radioshow
- 1984 - 1993: "Minimix"
- 1983 - 1992: "Grandmix" - The annual 100plus yearmix
- January till December 1999: Monthly re-run of the Grandmixes 1983 till 1992 and also the Classicsmix, all in a special directors cut on Radio 538
- 31 December 1999 Grandmix - The Millennium Edition - The first 180 minutes Grandmix aired on Radio 538 (from Akai DR8 digital multitrack recorder)
- 1999 - 2000 The Grandmix Tour, in clubs all over the Netherlands
- 2000 The "Minimix" returns on Radio 538, Friday-evening 2 records past 8/10
- 31 December 2000, Grandmix 2000 Broadcast on Radio 538 (Netherlands), 18:00-21:00 hour
- 2001 Ben starts using the Pioneer CDJ 1000 and AIRFX
- Grandmix 2001 Broadcast on Radio 538 (Netherlands), 31 December 2001, 18:00-21:00 hour
- 15 March 2002, the last broadcast of the Minimix on Radio 538, due to format changes
- 31 December 2002 Grandmix 2002 Broadcast on Radio 538 (Netherlands), 18:00-21:00 hour
- 22 January 2003 a Special Grandmix 2002 surround presentation was held
- 31 December 2003 Grandmix 2003 Broadcast on Radio 538 (Netherlands), 18:00-21:00 hour
- 9 January 2004 "In The Mix" Radioshow returns on Radio Veronica
- 31 December 2004 Grandmix 2004 Broadcast on Radio 538 (Netherlands), 18:00-21:00 hour
- 31 December 2005 Grandmix 2005 Broadcast on Radio 538 (Netherlands), 18:00-21:00 hour
- 31 December 2006 Grandmix 2006 Broadcast on Radio 538 (Netherlands), 18:00-21:00 hour
- 31 December 2007 Grandmix 2007 Broadcast on SLAM! FM (Netherlands), 18:00-21:00 hour
- 31 December 2008 Grandmix 2008 Broadcast on SLAM! FM (Netherlands), 18:00-21:00 hour
- 31 December 2009 Grandmix 2009 Broadcast on SLAM! FM (Netherlands), 18:00-21:00 hour
- 31 December 2010 Grandmix 2010 Broadcast on SLAM! FM (Netherlands), 18:00-21:00 hour
- 31 December 2011 Grandmix 2011 Broadcast on SLAM! FM (Netherlands), 18:00-21:00 hour
- 31 December 2012 Grandmix 2012 Broadcast on SLAM! FM (Netherlands), 18:00-21:00 hour
- 31 December 2013 Grandmix 2013 Broadcast on SLAM! FM (Netherlands), 18:00-21:00 hour
- 31 December 2014 Grandmix 2014 Broadcast on Radio Veronica (Netherlands), 18:00-21:00 hour
- 31 December 2015 Grandmix 2015 Broadcast on Radio Veronica (Netherlands), 21:00-24:00 hour
- December 2016 The "Minimix" and "In The Mix" ends on Radio Veronica
- 31 December 2016 Grandmix 2016 Broadcast on Radio Veronica (Netherlands), 21:00-24:00 hour
- 7 January 2017 "In The Mix" returns on Radio 10
- 31 December 2017 Grandmix 2017 Broadcast on Radio 538 (Netherlands), 18:00-21:00 hour
- 7 September 2018 The "Minimix" returns on Radio 10 and is now called "de bijna weekend minimix" ("the almost weekend minimix")
- 31 December 2018 Grandmix 2018 Broadcast on Radio 538 (Netherlands), 18:00-21:00 hour
- 31 December 2019 Grandmix Decade Edition on Radio 538 (Netherlands), 18:00-21:00 hour
- 31 December 2020 Grandmix 2020 broadcast on Radio 538 (Netherlands), 21:00-24:00 hour
- 31 December 2021 Grandmix 2021 broadcast on Radio 538 (Netherlands), 18:00-21:00 hour

== Release history ==
- 1982 Various - Discoh '82 (DJ Mix: Ben Liebrand) (1LP Vinyl)
- 1983 Ben Liebrand – Sound Effects And Linndrum Fills (1LP Vinyl)
- 1983 Various – Studio 57 (Side 4 The "O" Medley Mix By Ben Liebrand) (2LP Vinyl)
- 1983 Various – Studio 57 Vol 2 (DJ Mix By Ben Liebrand) (2LP Vinyl)
- 1983 Various – High Fashion Dance-Music (Non Stop Dance Remix) (1LP Vinyl)
- 1983 Various – High Fashion Dance-Music - Volume 2 (Non Stop Dance Remix) (1LP Vinyl)
- 1983 Various – Italo Remix (Volume 1) (Maxi Single Vinyl)
- 1984 Various – Italo Remix (Volume 2) (Maxi Single Vinyl)
- 1985 S.B.B.L. – Purple Mix (Maxi Single Vinyl)
- 1986 Various – High Fashion Dance-Music - Volume 3 (Non Stop Dance Remix) (1LP Vinyl)
- 1987 ALF – Stuck On Earth (Maxi Single Vinyl)
- 1988 ALF – Stuck On Earth (Housemix) (Maxi Single Vinyl)
- 1989 The Machine – Bolero (CD Maxi Single Vinyl)
- 1989 Ben Liebrand – The Eve Of The War (Ben Liebrand Remix) (CD Maxi Single)
- 1990 Ben Liebrand – Styles (1CD)
- 1990 Ben Liebrand Feat. Tony Scott – Move To The Bigband (CD Maxi Single)
- 1990 Ben Liebrand – Puls(t)ar (CD Maxi Single)
- 1991 The Crystal Palace – Son Of Godzilla (CD Maxi Single)
- 1991 Ben Liebrand Feat. CJ & CP – Give Me An Answer (CD Maxi Single)
- 1997 ISCO – Funkytown (CD Maxi Single)
- 1998 Ben Liebrand – Collectors Editions CD 1 (1CD)
- 1998 Ben Liebrand – Collectors Editions CD 2 (1CD)
- 1998 Ben Liebrand – Collectors Editions CD 3 (1CD)
- 1999 Grandmix - The Millennium Edition (3CD Box)
- Ben Liebrand Feat. The Gibson Brothers – Music & Passion (CD Maxi Single)
- 10 April 2000 Ben Liebrand – Minimix 1 (1CD)
- 2000 Grandmix - The Summer Edition (3CD Box)
- 2000 Ben Liebrand – The All Time Greatest Pop Mix (1CD)
- January 2001 Grandmix 2000 (3CD Box)
- 2001 Spirit of Disco - The Italo Edition (2CD)
- December 2001 Grandmix - The Disco Edition (3CD Box)
- January 2002 Grandmix 2001 (3CD Box)
- 16 January 2003 Grandmix 2002 (3CD Box)
- 2003 Ben Liebrand – Typisch Tachtig Mix (CD Single)
- 14 June 2003 Ben Liebrand – Styles XL (2CD)
- August 2003 Grand 12 Inches (4CD Box)
- October 2003 Grandmix - The Disco Edition II (3CD Box)
- January 2004 Grandmix 2003 (3CD Box)
- June 2004 Midsummer Megamix 2004 (1CD)
- October 2004 Grandmix - The 90's Edition (3CD Box)
- January 2005 Grandmix 2004 (3CD Box)
- August 2005 Grand 12 Inches 2 (4CD Box)
- August 2005 Megadance Summermix 2005 (1CD)
- November 2005 Grandmix - The 90's Edition II (3CD Box)
- November 2005 Grandmix VJ Visuals (6DVD) + Modular-One (2CD)
- January 2006 Grandmix 2005 (3CD Box)
- 1 June 2006 Grand 12 Inches 3 (4CD Box)
- November 2006 Grandmix Nouveau Disco (3CD Box)
- January 2007 Grandmix 2006 (3CD Box)
- 2007 Ben Liebrand – 50 Disco Hits (3CD Box)
- 5 June 2007 Grand 12 Inches 4 (4CD Box)
- 18 December 2007 Jaarmix 2007 (2CD)
- May 2008 Grand 12 Inches 5 (4CD Box)
- 2008 Ben Liebrand – Zomermix 2008 (2CD)
- 17 October 2008 Liebrand – 12-Inches (Ben Liebrand Remixes) (4CD Box)
- December 2008 Jaarmix 2008 (2CD)
- January 2009 Grandmix 2008 (3CD Box)
- April 2009 Grand 12 Inches 6 (4CD Box)
- 22 December 2009 Jaarmix 2009 (2CD)
- January 2010 Grandmix 2009 (3CD Box)
- 2 July 2010 Sascha & Ben Liebrand - Summer Dance Hits 2010 (2CD) (Ben Liebrand Mix on CD 1)
- August 2010 Grand 12 Inches 7 (4CD Box)
- 12 March 2010 Intergalactic Disco Funk (2CD)
- 24 April 2010 Ben & Sascha Liebrand – Future Vintage (4CD Box) (Ben Liebrand Mix on CD 1,3 & 4)
- 6 August 2010 Grand Slam! Vol. 3 (2CD) (Ben Liebrand Mix on CD 2)
- 28 August 2010 Intergalactic Disco Funk 2 (2CD)
- 22 October 2010 Grand Slam! Vol. 4 (2CD) (Ben Liebrand Mix on CD 2)
- 7 January 2011 Grandmix 2010 (3CD Box)
- June 2011 Grand 12 Inches 8 (4CD Box)
- 11 April 2011 Intergalactic Disco Funk 3 (2CD)
- 12 January 2012 Grandmix 2011 (3CD Box)
- 22 June 2012 Grand 12 Inches 9 (4CD Box)
- 28 December 2012 Grandmix 2012 (3CD Box)
- 28 June 2013 Grand 12 Inches 10 (6CD Box)
- 6 January 2014 Grandmix 2013 (3CD Box)
- May 2014 Grand 12 Inches 11 (4CD Box)
- October 2014 Grand 12 Inches 12 (4CD Box)
- 6 January 2015 Grandmix 2014 (3CD Box)
- June 2015 Ben Liebrand – Iconic Groove (2CD Box)
- 7 September 2015 Ben Liebrand – Iconic Groove (2LP in black and transparent vinyl)
- June 2015 Grand 12 Inches 13 (4CD Box)
- 29 December 2015 Grandmix 2015 (3CD Box)
- 17 March 2016 Grand 12 Inches 14 (4CD Box)
- 12 October 2016 Grand House Classics 1 (4CD Box)
- 6 January 2017 Grandmix 2016 (3CD Box)
- 2017 Grand 12 Inches 15 (4CD Box)
- 24 November 2017 Ben Liebrand – Let's Dance Edition (2CD)
- 5 January 2018 Grandmix 2017 (3CD Box)
- 2 March 2018 Grand 12 Inches 16 (4CD Box)
- 2 March 2018 Grand House Classics 2 (4CD Box)
- 19 October 2018 Grandmix Special Edition (3CD Box)
- January 2019 Grandmix 2018 (3CD Box)
- 31 July 2020 Grand 12 Inches 17 (4CD Box)
- 21 August 2020 Grandmix - Earth Wind & Fire And Friends (2CD)
- 27 May 2021 Various - High Fashion Non-Stop Dance Mix 5 (1CD + Vinyl)
- 2 July 2021 Grand 12 Inches 1 Vinyl (2LP in transparent Vinyl)
- 2 July 2021 Grand 12 Inches 2 Vinyl (2LP in transparent Vinyl)
- September 2021 The S.O.S. Band - Just Get Ready (Ben Liebrand Mixes) (Maxi Single Vinyl)
- 23 June 2023 Blanco y Negro presents Ben Liebrand in the Mix (4CD Digipack)
