= Discomagic Records =

Italian record label

Discomagic
- Founded: 1979; 47 years ago
- Founder: Severo Lombardoni
- Defunct: 1997
- Distributor: Discomagic srl
- Genre: Electronic
- Country of origin: Italy
- Location: Milan

Discomagic Records was the largest Italo-Disco/dance record label in Italy at the time and was run by Severo Lombardoni. It spawned a large number of sub-labels from the early 80s to the early 90s and it set the standards for an entire genre of music. Discomagic Records ran into a liquidity crisis in 1997, the rights to its catalogue were sold to Bernhard Mikulski (the owner of ZYX Music).

== Sub-labels ==
- 4Fun
- Academy Records
- Acetic Records
- Adriatric Club
- Afro Records
- Afronation Records
- Area Records
- Ash Records
- Atomic Records
- Blood Records
- Boom Boom Records
- BPM Records
- Choice Records
- Clown
- Condom Records
- Cosmic
- Countdown
- Cro-Mags
- Dance Progressive Records
- Dance Steps Records
- Disc-O-Very Records
- Disco Energy
- Diva Records
- Dream Records

== Songs & Compilations ==
Year	Artist	Song	Catalog Number
1980	Artist	"Song"	Catalog number
1980	Artist	"Song"	Catalog number

== Albums ==
Year	Artist	Song	Catalog Number
1980	Artist	"Album"	Catalog number
1980	Artist	"Album"	Catalog number
