= Gary Low =

Italian singer (born 1954)

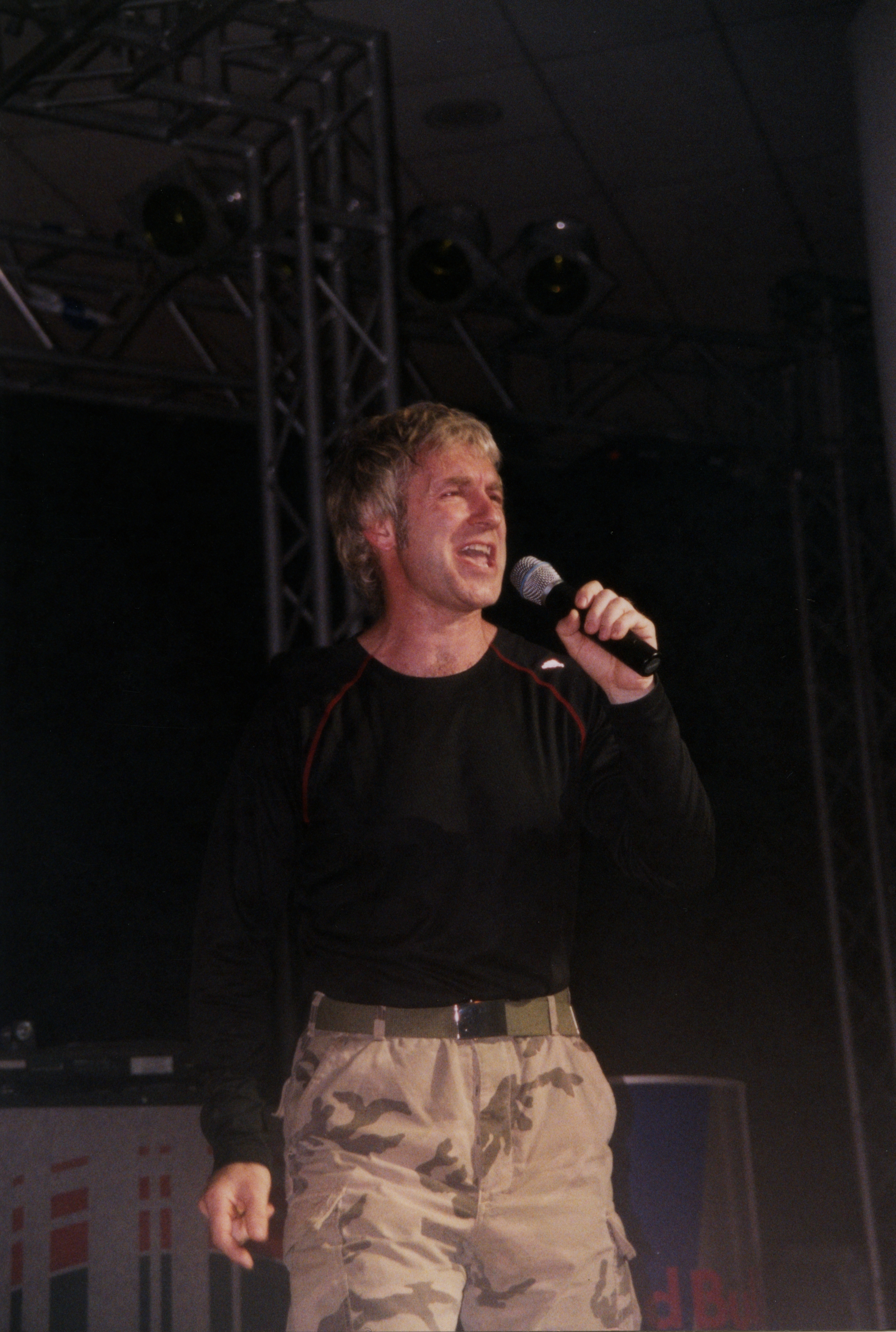
- Belmonte performing in 2004
- Born: Luis Romano Peris Belmonte; 7 June 1954 (age 72); Rome, Italy
- Occupation: Singer
- Years active: 1982–present
- Musical career
- Genres: Italo disco
- Instrument: Vocals
- Labels: Hispavox; CAT

Luis Romano Peris Belmonte (born 7 June 1954), known by his stage name Gary Low, is an Italian singer. He recorded several musical works in both English and Spanish. His recording of "I Want You" is prominently sampled on Washed Out's "Feel It All Around", used as the opening theme song of the television series Portlandia.

== Discography ==
=== Albums ===
- Go On (1983)
- La Colegiala (1984)
- Grandes Éxitos (1984)
- Rien ne va plus (1985)

=== Compilation albums ===
- The Best Of (1993), Unidisc (Canada release)
- I Want You – The Best of Gary Low (1994), Twilight Music (U.S. release)

=== Extended plays ===
- Gary Low's Summer (1984)

=== Singles ===
| Year | Single | Peak chart positions | | | | | | | Album |
| Year | Single | BEL (VL) | GER | NED | SPA | SUI | SWE | UK | Album |
|---|---|---|---|---|---|---|---|---|---|
| 1982 | "You Are a Danger" | 25 | — | 42 | 1 | 7 | — | — | Grandes Éxitos |
| 1983 | "Forever, Tonight and All My Life" | — | — | — | 4 | — | — | — | Go On |
| 1983 | "I Want You" | — | 37 | — | 4 | — | — | 52 | Go On |
| 1983 | "Where I Am" | — | — | — | — | — | — | — | Go On |
| 1983 | "Mi Querido Amor" | — | — | — | — | — | — | — | Go On |
| 1984 | "La Colegiala" | 22 | — | 28 | 1 | 11 | 17 | — | La Colegiala |
| 1984 | "Gary Low's Summer" | — | — | — | — | — | — | — | Non-album single |
| 1985 | "Non-Stop Searching/Play the Game" | — | — | — | — | — | — | — | La Colegiala |
| 1985 | "How Much" | — | — | — | 3 | — | — | — | Rien ne va plus |
| 1985 | "Niña/Don't Shout" | — | — | — | 6 | — | — | — | Rien ne va plus |
| 1986 | "I Wanna Be with You" | — | — | — | 3 | — | — | — | Non-album singles |
| 1990 | "Give Me a Friend" | — | — | — | — | — | — | — | Non-album singles |
| 1991 | "Dear Enemy" | — | — | — | — | — | — | — | Non-album singles |
| 2015 | "Bailame Así" | — | — | — | — | — | — | — | Non-album singles |
"—" denotes releases that did not chart

== See also ==
- List of Italian musicians
- List of Italo disco artists and songs
- List of people from Rome
- Music in Rome
