= Gazebo (musician) =

Italian singer, songwriter, musician and record producer (born 1960)

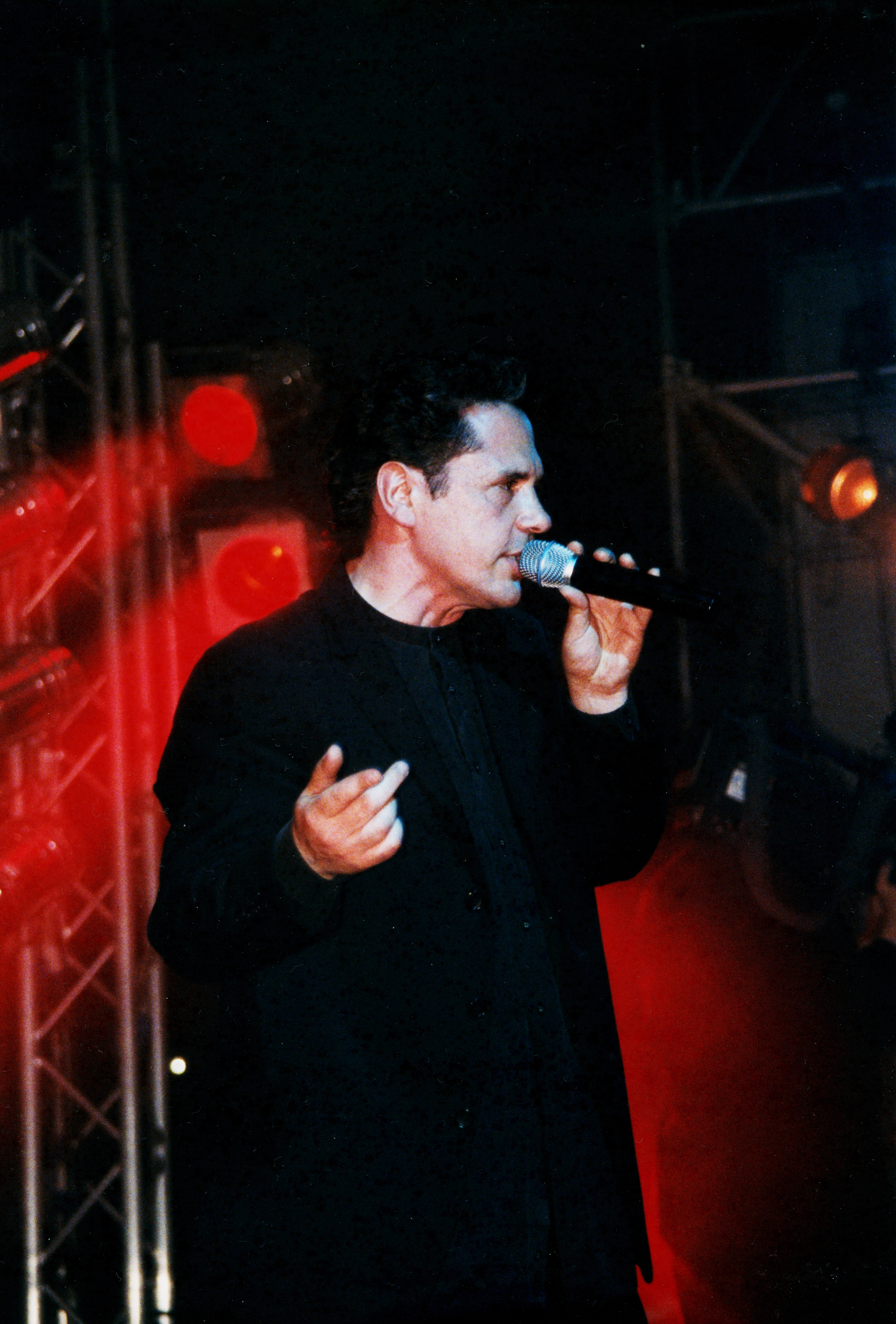
- Gazebo performing in 2004
- Born: Paul Mazzolini; 18 February 1960 (age 66); Beirut, Lebanon
- Occupations: Singer; songwriter; musician; record producer
- Years active: 1982–present
- Musical career
- Genre: Italo disco
- Instruments: Vocals; guitar; piano
- Label: Baby
- Website: gazebo.info

Paul Mazzolini (born 18 February 1960), known by his stage name Gazebo, is an Italian singer, songwriter, musician and record producer best known for his Italo disco music style during the 1980s. His song "I Like Chopin" reached No. 1 in more than 15 countries, and his debut single "Masterpiece" was also an international success.

== Early life ==
Mazzolini was born in Beirut, Lebanon, where his father worked as a diplomat in the Italian embassy. His family later lived in Jordan, Denmark and France. He also worked as a guitarist in London.

He graduated in 1983 with a university degree in French literature. He chose his stage name 'Gazebo' after the pavilion structure of the same name, because it sounded catchy.

While living for four years in Denmark he learned to speak Danish, which he demonstrated in a 1984 interview with the Danish television.

== Career ==
Mazzolini's debut single, the Italo disco "Masterpiece", was released in 1982; it was a significant commercial success in several countries and peaked at number two on the Italian charts. In 1983 he released "I Like Chopin". It sold 8 million copies worldwide and reached No. 1 of Italian charts along with 15 other countries, among them Germany, Spain and Austria. His single "Lunatic" (1983) also reached Top Ten in several European, Asian and Latin American countries. His work in that period was produced by Pierluigi Giombini, with whom he co-wrote the hit "Dolce Vita" for singer Ryan Paris.

Mazzolini is still touring and working on new albums. In addition, he is also working as a producer for other artists. In 2014 he acted in the film-comedy Sexy Shop.

== Discography ==
=== Albums ===
==== Studio albums ====
Title	Album details	Peak chart positions						
Title	Album details	IT	FIN	FRA	GER	JPN	SWE	SWI
Gazebo	Released: July 1983; Label: Baby; Formats: LP, MC	6	9	9	4	11	38	16
Telephone Mama	Released: November 1984; Label: Baby; Formats: LP, MC	—	—	—	—	73	—	—
Univision	Released: 1 June 1985; Label: Carosello; Formats: LP, MC	—	—	—	—	—	—	—
The Rainbow Tales	Released: 1987; Label: Carosello; Formats: CD, LP, MC	—	—	—	—	—	—	—
Sweet Life	Released: 1989; Label: Carosello; Formats: CD, LP, MC	—	—	—	—	—	—	—
Scenes from the News Broadcast	Released: September 1991; Label: Lunatic/Creus; Formats: CD, LP, MC	—	—	—	—	—	—	—
Portrait	Released: 1994; Label: Giungla; Formats: CD, MC	—	—	—	—	—	—	—
...The Syndrone	Released: 25 September 2008; Label: Softworks; Formats: CD, digital download	—	—	—	—	—	—	—
Reset	Released: 6 November 2015; Label: Softworks; Formats: CD, digital download	—	—	—	—	—	—	—
Italo by Numbers	Released: 16 March 2018; Label: Softworks; Formats: CD, LP, digital download	—	—	—	—	—	—	—
"—" denotes releases that did not chart or were not released in that territory.

==== Live albums ====
Title	Album details
I Like... Live!	Released: 1 October 2013; Label: Softworks; Formats: 2xCD, digital download

==== Remix albums ====
Title	Album details
Remixes	Released: 1 July 2002; Label: SSK; Formats: 2xCD, MC; South-East Asia and Eastern Europe-only release

==== Compilation albums ====
Title	Album details
The Best of Gazebo	Released: 1987; Label: Ariola; Formats: CD, MC; South-East Asia-only release
I Like Chopin – Best of Gazebo	Released: 21 October 1992; Label: Jimco; Formats: CD; Japan-only release
Greatest Hits	Released: 1993; Label: Baby; Formats: CD; Hong Kong-only release
Viewpoint	Released: 1998; Label: ZYX Music, Dig It; Formats: CD, MC
The Collection	Released: July 1998; Label: Ariola/BMG; Formats: CD, MC
Gazebo	Released: 2000; Label: LaserLight Digital; Formats: CD
The Best of Gazebo	Released: 2 October 2002; Label: Ariola/BMG; Formats: CD; Japan-only release
Best of Gazebo, Greatest Hits & Remixes	Released: 2002; Label: EQ Music; Formats: 2xCD; Singapore-only release
Gazebo	Released: 2007; Label: D.V. More; Formats: CD

=== Singles ===
Title	Year	Peak chart positions										Album
Title	Year	IT	AUT	BE (FL)	DEN	FIN	GER	JPN	NL	SPA	SWI	Album
"Masterpiece"	1982	2	—	—	—	18	35	—	—	—	5	Gazebo
"I Like Chopin"	1983	2	1	3	1	1	1	9	7	1	1	Gazebo
"Love in Your Eyes"	1983	—	—	—	—	—	—	—	—	—	—	Gazebo
"Lunatic"	1983	5	13	—	6	—	4	—	—	14	6	Gazebo
"Telephone Mama"	1984	12	—	—	—	—	—	—	—	16	—	Telephone Mama
"First" (Germany and Switzerland-only release)	1985	—	—	—	—	—	—	—	—	—	—	Telephone Mama
"For Anita" (Spain-only release)	1985	—	—	—	—	—	—	—	—	—	—	Telephone Mama
"Trotsky Burger"	1986	—	—	—	—	—	—	—	—	19	—	Univision
"The Sun Goes Down on Milky Way"	1987	—	—	—	—	—	—	—	—	—	—	Univision
"Give Me One Day"	1987	—	—	—	—	—	—	—	—	—	—	Non-album single
"Dolce Vita" (Germany-only release)	1988	—	—	—	—	—	—	—	—	—	—	Sweet Life
"Coincidence" (UK-only release)	1989	—	—	—	—	—	—	—	—	—	—	The Rainbow Tales
"Ordinary Life" (Germany-only release)	1989	—	—	—	—	—	—	—	—	—	—	The Rainbow Tales
"The Fourteenth of July"	1989	—	—	—	—	—	—	—	—	—	—	Scenes from the News Broadcast
"I Like Chopin '91"	1991	—	—	—	—	—	—	—	—	—	—	Scenes from the News Broadcast
"I Like Chopin" (1992 remix)	1992	—	—	—	—	—	—	—	—	—	—	Non-album single
"I Like Chopin '98" (Germany-only release)	1998	—	—	—	—	—	—	—	—	—	—	Viewpoint
"Tears for Galileo"	2006	—	—	—	—	—	—	—	—	—	—	...The Syndrone
"Ladies!"	2008	—	—	—	—	—	—	—	—	—	—	...The Syndrone
"Queen of Burlesque"	2011	—	—	—	—	—	—	—	—	—	—	Reset
"Blindness"	2015	—	—	—	—	—	—	—	—	—	—	Reset
"Wet Wings"	2015	—	—	—	—	—	—	—	—	—	—	Reset
"La Divina"	2018	—	—	—	—	—	—	—	—	—	—	Italo by Numbers
"I Like Chopin 2020" (Radio Coronaversion)	2020	—	—	—	—	—	—	—	—	—	—	Non-album single
"—" denotes releases that did not chart or were not released in that territory.
