= Ryan Paris =

Italian musician and actor (born 1953)

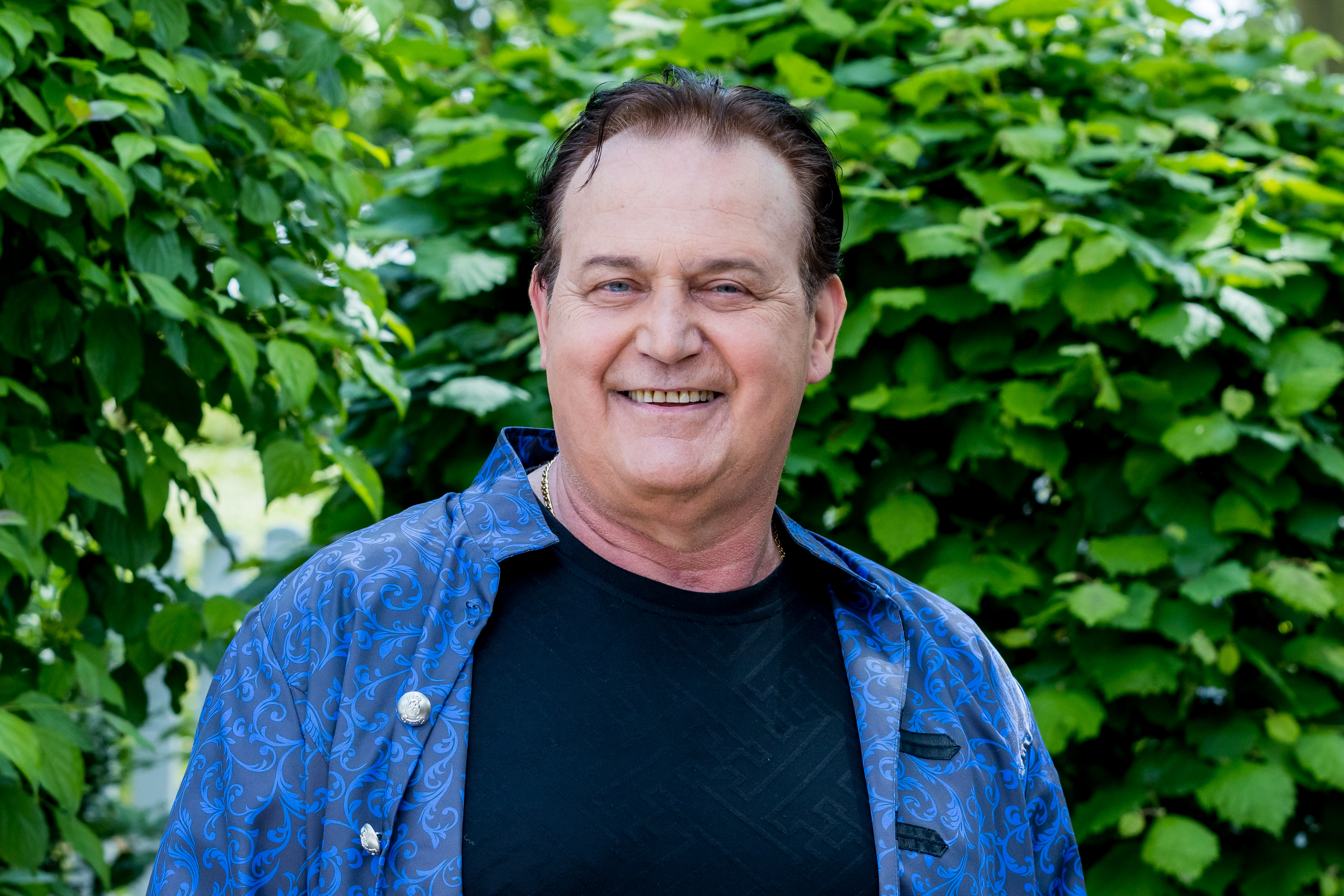
- Ryan Paris at the ZDF-Fernsehgarten in 2023
- Born: Fabio Roscioli; 12 March 1953 (age 73); Rome, Italy
- Occupations: Singer; songwriter; musician; actor
- Years active: 1983–present
- Musical career
- Genres: Italo disco; synth-pop
- Instruments: Vocals; guitar
- Labels: Carrere; RCA

Fabio Roscioli (born 12 March 1953), known by his stage name Ryan Paris, is an Italian singer, songwriter, musician and actor. He gained international recognition in 1983 for the hit single "Dolce Vita", written and produced by Pierluigi Giombini.

== Early life ==
Roscioli was raised in Rome, where he developed an early interest in music, influenced by his great-uncle, an opera singer, which sparked his passion for performance by age five.

During his youth, Paris was active in Rome's rock music scene, performing with local bands. In 1982, while preparing for the quarter-finals of the first Rock Festival at Rome's Piper Club, his band faced a challenge when their keyboardist was called for military service. Through a drummer's connection, Paris met Fabio Liberatori of the band Stadio, who introduced him to producer and composer Pierluigi Giombini, a pivotal moment in his career.

In 1983, Paris collaborated with Giombini to create his signature Italo disco song, "Dolce Vita."

"Dolce Vita"
An audio sample of "Dolce Vita"

== Career ==
=== 1980s ===
"Dolce Vita" was released in the United Kingdom on the Carrere Records label, distributed by RCA and spent ten weeks in the UK Singles Chart, peaking at Number 5. The record peaked at Number 1 in France, Belgium, Netherlands, Denmark, Norway, Spain and peaked at Number 3 in West Germany. Ryan Paris continued to release records in the mid-1980s and 1990s.

=== 2010s ===
In 2010, he made a comeback with a new song, "I Wanna Love You Once Again", which he wrote and composed, with production by Eddy Mi Ami. At the end of that year, Paris co-produced a remix of "Dolce Vita" which peaked at number 54 in the official French club chart.

In 2013, the song "Sensation of Love", written and produced by Paris, was released as a single by Bulgarian artist Miroslav Kostadinov, peaking at number 15 in the official Bulgarian CD chart. A new version of the song, with a more 1980s vibe, co-produced by Paris together with Eddy Mi Ami and sung in a duet with Valerie Flor, was released in March 2014.

Paris continues to record and produce songs; his most recent releases include the songs "You Are My Life", "Buonasera Dolce Vita" and "Love on Ice". In December 2017, Paris sang "Dolce Vita" in the Catalan language for the Fundació la Marato. This version was produced by Jordi Cubino (David Lyme) and was recorded as a charity single for the benefit of the foundation, with the proceeds being utilised for the study of several human illnesses.

=== Collaborations with Mac DeMarco ===
In May 2015, the music web magazine Pitchfork released a documentary about Canadian indie rock musician Mac DeMarco entitled Pepperoni Playboy on its official YouTube channel. During the documentary, DeMarco mentioned that he drew inspiration from Ryan Paris.

In January 2016, Paris uploaded a video to YouTube in which he thanked DeMarco and invited him to remix his 1983 hit *"Dolce Vita"*. DeMarco later responded with a YouTube video of his own, expressing interest in collaborating.

Their friendship eventually led to recording sessions together, resulting in the songs "Simply Paradise"* and "Still What I’m Looking For", blending Paris’s 1980s pop style with DeMarco’s minimalist sound.

In 2025, Paris joined DeMarco on stage during the Berlin stop of his European tour, where they performed *"Dolce Vita"* together live. Paris later described the collaboration as “the beginning of a beautiful long friendship in music and personally.”

== Discography ==
=== Albums ===
- 1984: Ryan Paris, RCA Italiana (released in Italy only)
- 2002: The Best Of
- 2000: I Successi
- 2002: Best Of
- 2004: Dolce Vita (Box mit 2 CDs)
- 2004: Let’s Do It Together
- 2004: Don’t Let Me Down

=== Singles ===
- 1983: "Dolce Vita"
- 1984: "Fall in Love"
- 1984: "Paris on My Mind"
- 1984: "Bluette"
- 1985: "Harry’s Bar"
- 1988: "Besoin d’amour"
- 1989: "Dolce Vita" (Remix)
- 1991: "Dolce Vita" / "Fall in Love"
- 1992: "The Beat Goes On"
- 1993: "Don’t Let Me Down"
- 1994: "Mr. Jones"
- 1995: "It’s My Life" (Gen 64 feat. Ryan Paris)
- 1997: "Only for You" (Favilli feat. Ryan Paris)
- 1999: "Dolce Vita ’99"
- 2009: "Dolce Vita" (re-master)
- 2010: "I Wanna Love You Once Again"
- 2010: "In Love Again"
- 2011: "Tiki–Tiki–Tiki"
- 2012: "Parisienne Girl" (80’s Remix)
- 2013: "Sensation of Love"
- 2013: "Yo quiero amarte una vez mas"
- 2015: "Together Again"
- 2016: "It's My Life" (Remix by Eddy Mi Ami)
- 2017: "Buonasera Dolce Vita" (feat. Mauro)
- 2017: "Dolce vita la marato" (Jordi Cubino version)
- 2018: "Can Delight" (duet with George Aaron)
- 2023: "Simply Paradise" (duet with Mac DeMarco)
- 2024: “Still What I’m Looking For” (duet with Mac Demarco)

== See also ==
- One-hit wonders in the UK
