= List of songs recorded by Righeira =

Songs recorded by Righeira

This is a list of all songs recorded by Righeira.

== Songs ==
Key
‡	Indicates song released as a single
†	Indicates song not written by Righeira
#	Indicates song originally released as a B-side

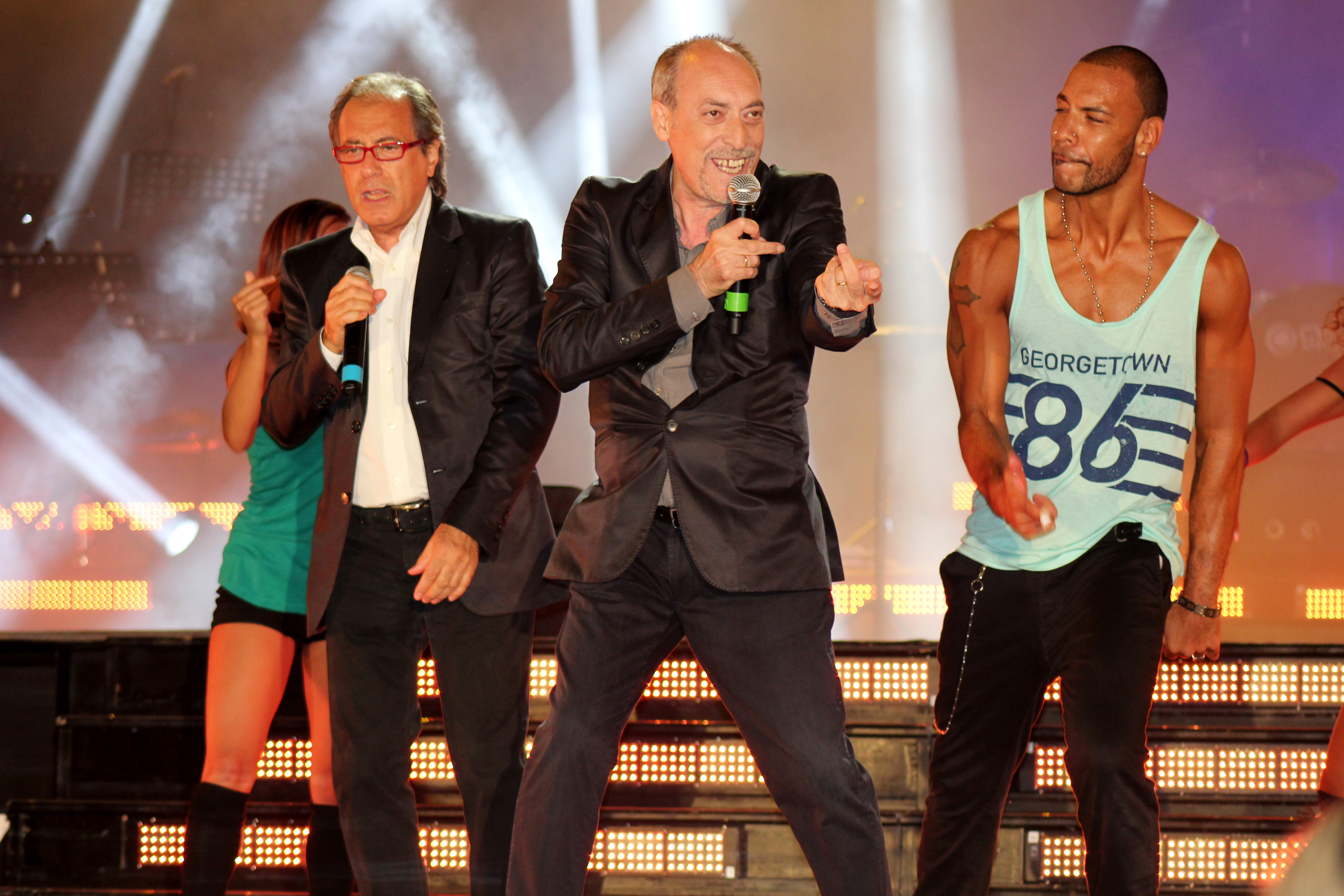
La Bionda (pictured in 2013) were Righeira's primary producers, producing most of their recordings.

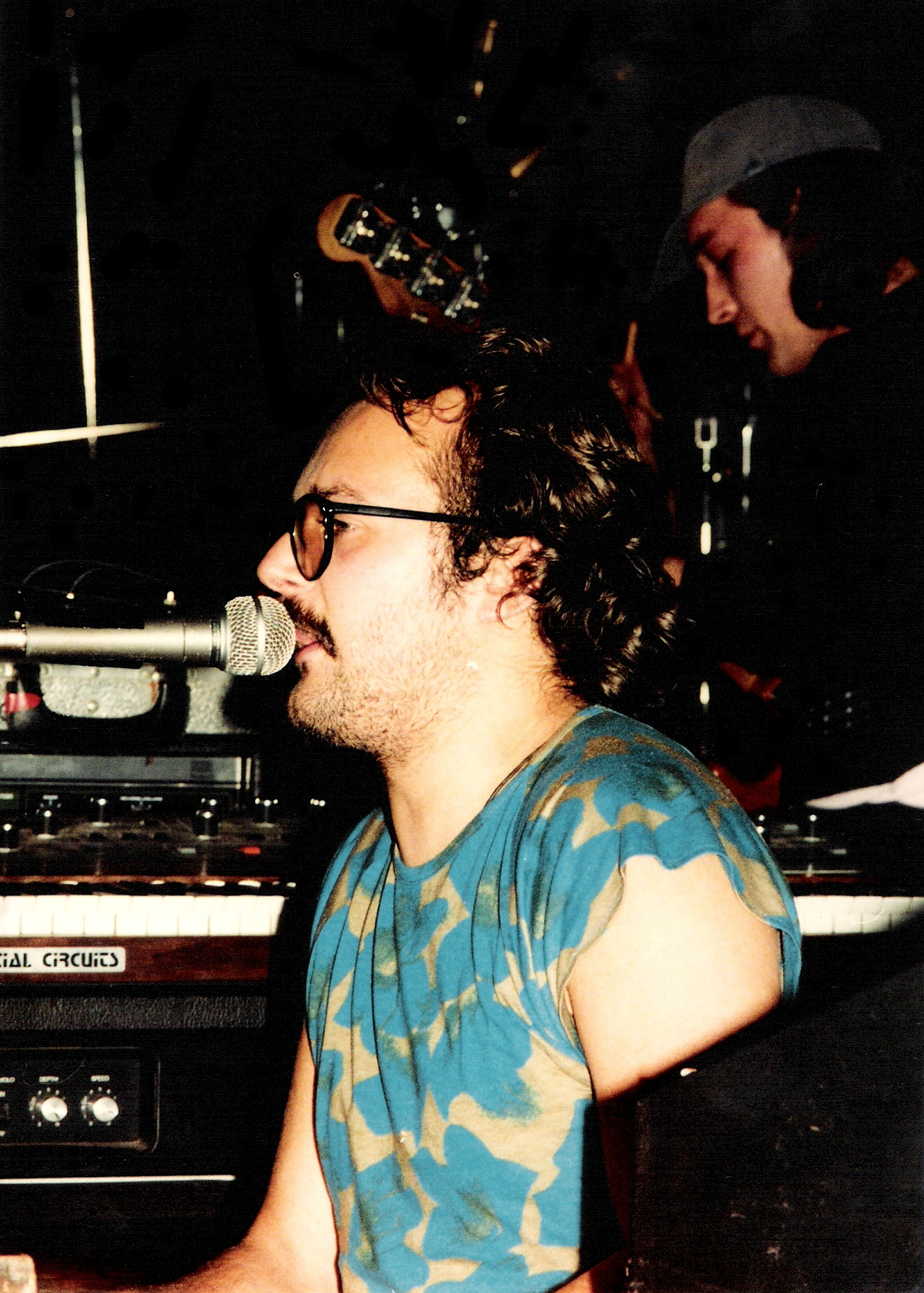
The song "Jazz Musik" from Righeira (1983) was written by Hermann Weindorf (pictured in 1982), who also co-produced the album.

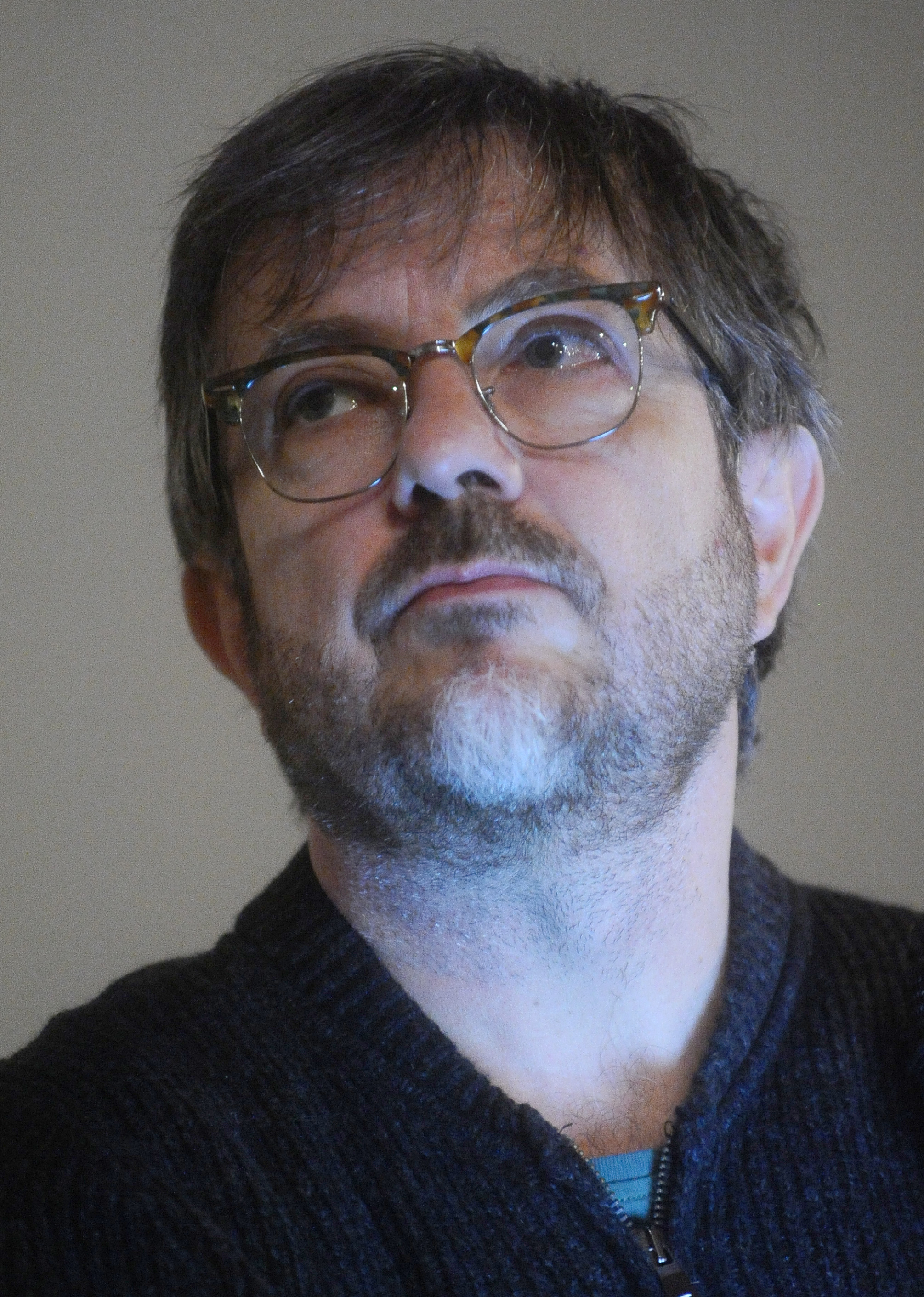
Sergio Conforti (pictured in 2016) collaborated with Righeira on their 1986 album Bambini Forever.

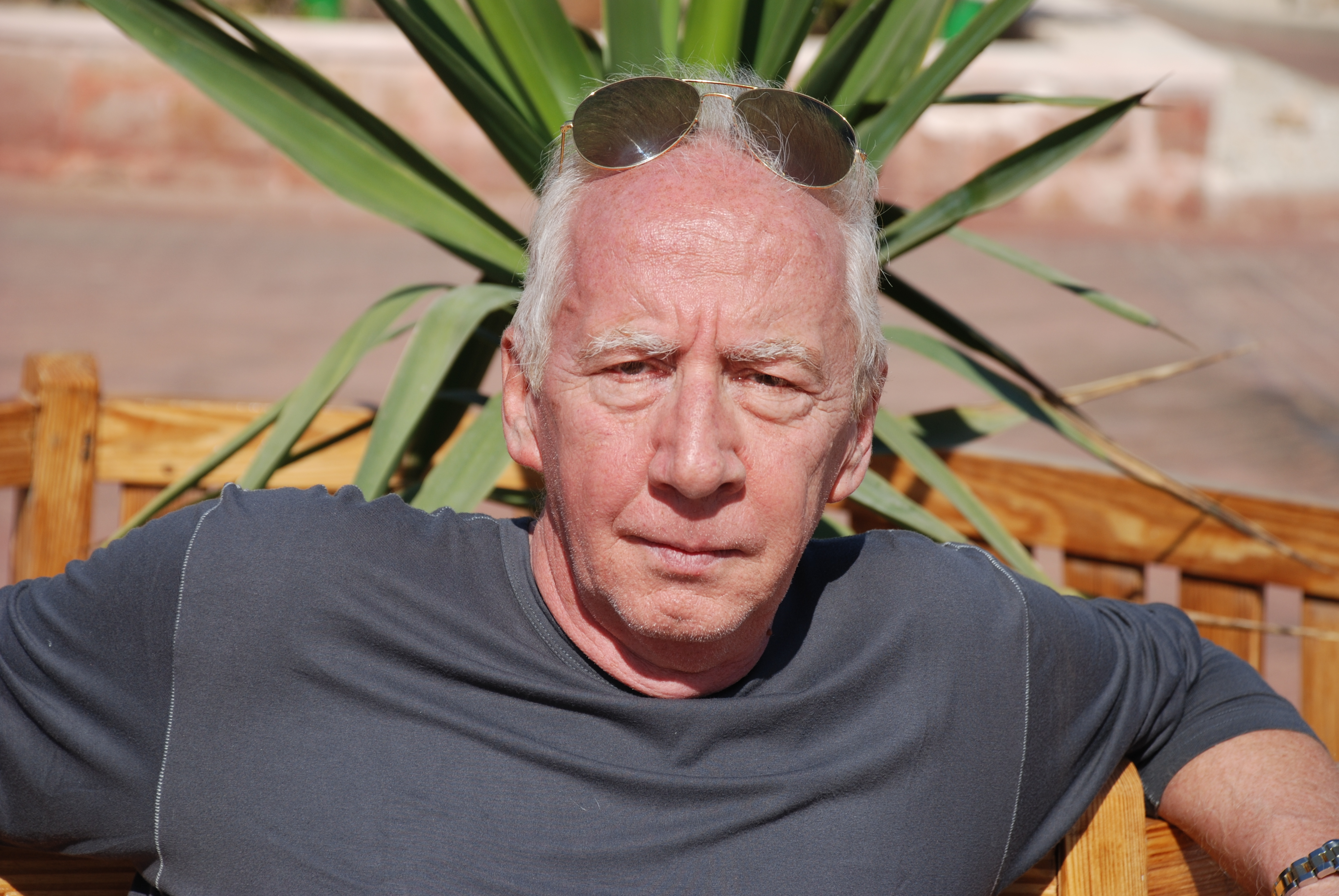
Righeira collaborated with lyricist Cristiano Minellono (pictured in 2009) on the song "Innamoratissimo".

Name of song, original release, songwriter and year of original release
Song	Original release	Songwriter(s)	Year	Ref(s)
"3-D" #	Bambini Forever (B-side of "Italians a Go-Go")	Righi	1986	
"Accendi la televisione"	Mondovisione	Rota; Tiziano Lamberti	2007	
"Adalas Omaet" #	Non-album single (B-side of "Garageamos")	Righeira; Claudio Corradini	1989	
"Adelante"	Bambini Forever	Rota	1986	
"Arruinado" #	Bambini Forever (B-side of "Bambini Forever")	Righi	1986	
"Bambini Forever" ‡	Bambini Forever	Righeira; La Bionda	1986	
"China Disco"	Mondovisione	Righeira; Tiziano Lamberti	2007	
"Compañero" ‡	Non-album single	—N/a	1988	
"Die Wende"	Mondovisione	Rota; Tiziano Lamberti	2007	
"Dimmi di no" #	Non-album single (B-side of "Ferragosto")	Righeira; Claudio Corradini	1990	
"Dimmi con chi vai"	Uno, Zero, Centomila	—N/a	1992	
"Disco Volante"	Righeira	Righi	1983	
"Electro Felicity"	Mondovisione	Rota; Tiziano Lamberti	2007	
"Ferragosto" ‡	Non-album single	Righi; Gianni Grottoli; Andrea Vaschetti	1990	
"Fine delle trasmissioni"	Mondovisione	Rota; Tiziano Lamberti	2007	
"Futurista" #	Mondovisione (B-side of "La musica electronica")	Rota; Tiziano Lamberti	2007	
"Garageamos" ‡	Greatest Hits (Non-album single)	Righeira; Claudio Corradini	1989	
"Gli parlerò di te" #	Righeira (B-side of "Innamoratissimo (Tu che fai battere forte il mio cuore)")	Righi	1983	
"Hey Mama" ‡	Righeira '83-'85 (Non-album single)	Righeira; La Bionda; Luca Orioli	1984	
"Il destino di una nazione"	Mondovisione	Rota; Tiziano Lamberti	2007	
"Il male che mi fa"	Uno, Zero, Centomila	—N/a	1992	
"Il numero che non c'è"	Mondovisione	Rota; Tiziano Lamberti	2007	
"Innamoratissimo (Tu che fai battere forte il mio cuore)" ‡	Bambini Forever	Righeira; La Bionda; Sergio Conforti; Cristiano Minellono	1986	
"Inizio delle trasmissioni"	Mondovisione	Rota; Tiziano Lamberti	2007	
"Invisibile"	Mondovisione	Rota; Tiziano Lamberti; Bonato	2007	
"Italians a Go-Go" ‡	Bambini Forever	Righeira; La Bionda; Sergio Conforti	1986	
"Jazz Musik"	Righeira	Hermann Weindorf †	1983	
"Keeping Close to the Music"	Uno, Zero, Centomila	—N/a	1992	
"Kon Tiki"	Righeira	Righi; Karen McMichael	1983	
"L'estate sta finendo" ‡	Righeira '83-'85 (Non-album single)	Righeira; La Bionda	1985	
"La mujer que tu quieres"	Mondovisione	Mark Mothersbaugh; Gerald Casale †	2007	
"La musica electronica" ‡	Mondovisione	Rota; Tiziano Lamberti	2007	
"La voglia di nuotare"	Uno, Zero, Centomila	—N/a	1992	
"Luciano Serra pilota"	Righeira	Righi	1983	
"Mondovisione"	Mondovisione	Rota; Tiziano Lamberti	2007	
"No Tengo Dinero" ‡	Righeira	Rota; La Bionda	1983	
"Oasi in città" ‡	Bambini Forever	Righeira; La Bionda	1986	
"Ore d'amore"	Uno, Zero, Centomila	—N/a	1992	
"Prima dell'estate" #	Righeira '83-'85 (B-side of "L'estate sta finendo")	Righeira; La Bionda	1985	
"She Was My Love"	Bambini Forever	Righeira; Steve Piccolo	1986	
"Solo un minuto"	Bambini Forever	Righi; Sergio Conforti	1986	
"Tanzen mit Righeira" ‡	Righeira	Righi	1983	
"Tu sei sul video"	Mondovisione	Rota; Tiziano Lamberti	2007	
"Tu ti muovi"	Uno, Zero, Centomila	—N/a	1992	
"Uno, Zero, Centomila"	Uno, Zero, Centomila	—N/a	1992	
"Vamos a la playa" ‡	Righeira	Righi; La Bionda	1983	
"Vivo al 139"	Uno, Zero, Centomila	—N/a	1992	
"We Wanna Be Punk"	Bambini Forever	Righi; Steve Piccolo	1986	

== See also ==
- Righeira discography
