= Righeira discography =

Cataloging of published recordings by Righeira

- Studio albums: 4
- EPs: 1
- Compilation albums: 8
- Singles: 14
- Music videos: 3

Italian Italo disco duo Righeira have released four studio albums, eight compilation albums, one extended play (EP), 14 singles and three music videos.

== Albums ==
=== Studio albums ===
List of studio albums
Title	Album details
Righeira	Released: 28 September 1983; Label: CGD (ITA); Formats: LP, cassette
Bambini Forever	Released: 23 June 1986; Label: CGD (ITA); Formats: LP, cassette
Uno, Zero, Centomila	Released: 1992; Label: RCA (ITA); Formats: CD, cassette
Mondovisione	Released: 2 February 2007; Label: SAIFAM (ITA); Formats: CD

=== Compilation albums ===
List of compilation albums
Title	Album details
Righeira '83-'85	Released: 1985; Label: CGD (ITA)
L'estate sta finendo	Released: 1988; Label: CGD (ITA)
Vamos a la playa	Released: 1989; Label: CGD (ITA)
The Best	Released: 24 March 2002; Label: D.V. More Record (ITA)
Greatest Hits	Released: 25 May 2002; Label: D.V. More Record (ITA)
Turbo Disco	Released: 2003; Label: Центр Музыкального Сервиса (RUS)
Référence 80	Released: March 2012; Label: LM Music (FRA)
The Best of	Released: 2022; Label: UDP (ITA)

== EPs ==
List of EPs
Title	Album details
EP 2002	Released: 2002; Label: S.A.I.F.A.M. Classics (ITA)

== Singles ==
List of singles, with selected chart positions and certifications
Title	Year	Peak chart positions									Sales	Certifications	Album
Title	Year	AUT	BEL	GER	ITA	NLD	NOR	SPA	SWI	UK	Sales	Certifications	Album
"Tanzen mit Righeira"	1983	—	—	—	—	—	—	—	—	—			Righeira
"Vamos a la playa"	1983	11	2	3	1	2	6	6	1	53	WW: 3,000,000		Righeira
"No tengo dinero"	1983	—	21	12	15	10	—	—	20	—			Righeira
"Hey Mama"	1984	—	—	—	—	—	—	—	—	—			Non-album single
"L'estate sta finendo"	1985	—	—	35	1	—	—	—	18	—	ITA: 300,000	ITA: Gold	Non-album single
"Innamoratissimo"	1986	—	—	—	9	—	—	—	—	—			Bambini Forever
"Italians a Go-Go"	1986	—	—	—	—	—	—	—	—	—			Bambini Forever
"Bambini Forever"	1986	—	—	—	—	—	—	—	—	—			Bambini Forever
"Oasi in città"	1987	—	—	—	—	—	—	—	—	—			Bambini Forever
"Compañero"	1988	—	—	—	—	—	—	—	—	—			Non-album single
"Garageamos/Adalas Omaet"	1989	—	—	—	—	—	—	—	—	—			Non-album single
"Ferragosto"	1990	—	—	—	—	—	—	—	—	—			Non-album single
"2001: Vamos a la playa"	2001	—	—	—	—	—	—	—	—	—			Non-album single
"La musica electronica"	2007	—	—	—	41	—	—	—	—	—			Mondovisione
"—" denotes a title that did not chart, or was not released in that territory.

== Videography ==
=== Documentaries ===
Title	Details	Director
Tanzen mit Righeira	Released: 2008; Distributor: Documè	Alessandro Castelletto

=== Music videos ===
Title	Year	Director
"Vamos a la playa"	1983	Pierluigi de Mas
"Luciano Serra pilota"	1983	Pierluigi de Mas
"No tengo dinero"	1983	Pierluigi de Mas

== See also ==
- List of songs recorded by Righeira
