= Luciano Serra pilota (song) =

1983 song by Righeira

Song by Righeira

from the album Righeira
- Language: Italian
- Released: 28 September 1983
- Recorded: 1983
- Genre: Italo disco
- Length: 3:27
- Label: CGD
- Songwriter: Johnson Righeira
- Producer: La Bionda

Music video
- "Luciano Serra pilota" on YouTube

"Luciano Serra pilota" is a song by the Italian Italo disco duo Righeira, included on their debut studio album, Righeira (1983). Johnson Righeira, the writer of the song, was inspired to write the song after an Italian war drama film of the same name.

== Composition ==
Johnson Righeira wrote "Luciano Serra pilota" with inspiration from the 1938 Italian war drama film Luciano Serra, Pilot starring Amedeo Nazzari as Luciano Serra. In an interview with Rolling Stone magazine, Righi commented, "The song was mainly based on D.A.F. and Kraftwerk, one of my favourite bands."

"Luciano Serra pilota" was one of five songs from Righeira to be written solely by Righi (the other four being "Tanzen mit Righeira", "Gli parlerò di te", "Disco Volante" and "Kon Tiki").

== Critical reception ==
In a review of the Righeira album, the song was described, along with "Gli parlerò di te" and "Kon Tiki", as a "hidden pearl of dance and pop music".

According to the staff from the Obscure Music Club, it's a "true electrosynth masterpiece".

== Music video ==
Pierluigi de Mas directed the music video for "Luciano Serra pilota", which was filmed in Italy. It premiered on MTV in Italy in 1983 together with the duo's hit single "Vamos a la playa" from the same album, followed by "No Tengo Dinero" in 1984.

In the music video, Righi and Rota, dressed in pilot uniforms, sings and dance in front of a greenscreen with an image of a biplane as background. In addition to the song, the editors added sounds of machine guns, aircraft and military trumpet signals. The singing has a robotic and tight rhythm, heavily inspired by German music productions.

=== Reception and analysis ===
Rolling Stone's Eric Pfeil described the music video for "Luciano Serra pilota" as "[a] parody of fascist heroes". Pfeil added that "paying homage to the Italian fighter pilot Luciano Serra wouldn't have been necessary [...] The Italian propaganda film of the same name from 1938 goes back to the ideas of Benito Mussolini".

== Credits and personnel ==
- Johnson Righeira – songwriter, vocals
- Michael Righeira – vocals
- Carmelo La Bionda – producer
- Michelangelo La Bionda – producer
- Hermann Weindorf – co-producer, arranger
- Berthold Weindorf – engineering, mixing
- Ben Fenner – engineering, mixing

Credits and personnel adapted from the Righeira album liner notes.
