= Gli parlerò di te =

1983 song by Righeira

Song by Righeira

from the album Righeira
- Language: Italian
- Released: 28 September 1983
- Recorded: 1983
- Genre: Italo disco
- Length: 4:19
- Label: CGD
- Songwriter: Johnson Righeira
- Producer: La Bionda

Righeira singles chronology
"Italians a Go-Go" (1986)	"Innamoratissimo (Tu che fai battere forte il mio cuore)" / "Gli parlerò di te" (1986)	"Bambini Forever" (1986)

"Gli parlerò di te" is a song by the Italian Italo disco duo Righeira from their debut album, Righeira, released in September 1983. It was written by Johnson Righeira. It was also issued as a non-album single in Italy, in 1986, as the B-side to "Innamoratissimo (Tu che fai battere forte il mio cuore)".

The song's lyrics talks about an Italian astronaut who's on a mission.

== Background ==
"Gli parlerò di te" was written by Johnson Righeira. In a Vice interview, Righi said that the song was one of his favourites from the Righeira album.

== Composition ==
"Gli parlerò di te" is in the key of C♯/D♭ and in 4/4 time. The guitar parts featured on the track are played by Swedish guitarist Mats Björklund.

The song's lyrics talks about an Italian astronaut who is about to carry out a mission, leaving without knowing if he'll ever return.

== Release and reception ==
CGD released Righeira in Italy on 28 September 1983, with "Gli parlerò di te" sequenced as the third track on side one of the LP, between "Luciano Serra pilota" and "No Tengo Dinero". In a 2018 review of the album for Fond/Sound, author Diego Olivas wrote that "on tracks like "Jazz Musik", "Gli parlerò di te", and "Kon Tiki" you get the sense that all the crew involved really took umbrage to decadent Italy, there outré culture was selling, and they themselves didn’t feel privy to." He concludes that "everything on Righeira sounded "off" in the most unpretentious, yet surgically designed way they could." CGD released "Gli parlerò di te" in Italy as the B-side to "Innamoratissimo (Tu che fai battere forte il mio cuore)" in 1986. "Innamoratissimo" peaked at number six on the Italian Hit Parade in 1986.

The song has been described as a "hidden pearl" of dance and pop music. Vittorio Papa writes that the song has a "perfectly sharpened and melodic rhythm" suitable for dance floors.

== Credits and personnel ==
- Johnson Righeira – songwriter, vocals
- Carmelo La Bionda – producer
- Michelangelo La Bionda – producer
- Hermann Weindorf – co-producer, arranger
- Berthold Weindorf – engineering, mixing
- Ben Fenner – engineering, mixing

Credits and personnel adapted from the Righeira album liner notes.

== Sources ==
- Salvatori, Dario (1989). Storia dell'Hit Parade. Gremese. p. 217. ISBN 8876054391.
