= List of number-one hits of 1983 (Argentina) =

This is a list of the songs that reached number one in Argentina in 1983, according to Cashbox magazine with data provided by the Argentine Chamber of Phonograms and Videograms Producers.

Issue date	Song	Artist(s)
January 8	"Entre La Espada Y La Pared"	Dúo Manzanilla
January 15	"Olvídame y Pega la Vuelta"	Pimpinela
January 22	"Olvídame y Pega la Vuelta"	Pimpinela
January 29	"Olvídame y Pega la Vuelta"	Pimpinela
February 5	"Olvídame y Pega la Vuelta"	Pimpinela
February 12	"Olvídame y Pega la Vuelta"	Pimpinela
February 19	"Olvídame y Pega la Vuelta"	Pimpinela
March 19	"Olvídame y Pega la Vuelta"	Pimpinela
March 26	"Olvídame y Pega la Vuelta"	Pimpinela
April 2	"Olvídame y Pega la Vuelta"	Pimpinela
April 9	"Olvídame y Pega la Vuelta"	Pimpinela
April 16	"Olvídame y Pega la Vuelta"	Pimpinela
April 23	"Olvídame y Pega la Vuelta"	Pimpinela
April 30	"Olvídame y Pega la Vuelta"	Pimpinela
May 14	"Olvídame y Pega la Vuelta"	Pimpinela
May 21	"Olvídame y Pega la Vuelta"	Pimpinela
May 28	"Olvídame y Pega la Vuelta"	Pimpinela
June 4	"Olvídame y Pega la Vuelta"	Pimpinela
June 18	"Olvídame y Pega la Vuelta"	Pimpinela
June 25	"¿Y Cómo es El?"	José Luis Perales
July 2	"¿Y Cómo es El?"	José Luis Perales
July 9	"¿Y Cómo es El?"	José Luis Perales
July 23	"¿Y Cómo es El?"	José Luis Perales
July 30	"¿Y Cómo es El?"	José Luis Perales
August 6	"¿Y Cómo es El?"	José Luis Perales
August 13	"Directo al corazón"	Luis Miguel
August 27	"Directo al corazón"	Luis Miguel
September 10	"Fame"	Irene Cara
September 17	"Flashdance... What a Feeling"	Irene Cara
October 1	"Flashdance... What a Feeling"	Irene Cara
October 8	"Flashdance... What a Feeling"	Irene Cara
October 15	"Flashdance... What a Feeling"	Irene Cara
October 22	"Flashdance... What a Feeling"	Irene Cara
November 5	"Flashdance... What a Feeling"	Irene Cara
November 12	"Paraíso"	Pomada
November 19	"Vamos a la playa"	Righeira
November 26	"Vamos a la playa"	Righeira
December 10	"Vamos a la playa"	Righeira
December 17	"Vamos a la playa"	Righeira
December 24	"Vamos a la playa"	Righeira
December 31	"A Esa"	Pimpinela

== See also ==
- 1983 in music
