= Innamoratissimo (Tu che fai battere forte il mio cuore) =

1986 single by Righeira

- Artwork for the German vinyl single release

Single by Righeira

from the album Bambini Forever
- Language: Italian
- B-side: "Gli parlerò di te"
- Released: 1986
- Genre: Italo disco
- Length: 5:43 (album version); 4:00 (single version)
- Label: CGD
- Songwriters: Johnson Righeira; Michael Righeira; Carmelo La Bionda; Michelangelo La Bionda; Sergio Conforti; Cristiano Minellono
- Producer: La Bionda

Righeira singles chronology
"L'estate sta finendo" (1985)	"Innamoratissimo (Tu che fai battere forte il mio cuore)" (1986)	"Italians a Go-Go" (1986)

Music video
- "Innamoratissimo" on YouTube

"Innamoratissimo (Tu che fai battere forte il mio cuore)" is a song by the Italian Italo disco duo Righeira, released in 1986 as the second single from their second album, Bambini Forever (1986). The song was co-written by Johnson Righeira, Michael Righeira, Carmelo La Bionda, Michelangelo La Bionda, Sergio Conforti and Cristiano Minellono, and produced by La Bionda.

The song was performed at the Sanremo Music Festival in February 1986, at which it was first brought to fame. However, the song ended up in fifteenth place out of 22 competing performances in the Big Artists section after the final voting. "Innamoratissimo" was targeted by critics, but the duo were praised after their performance, regarding their lack of knowledge in staging big performances.

== Release ==
The original version of "Innamoratissimo" was released early in 1986 on the CGD label and featured "Gli parlerò di te" as the B-side, which was featured on the A-side of Righeira's debut album Righeira, released in September 1983. By April 1986, "Innamoratissimo" had become a popular single in Italy. CGD issued Bambini Forever on 23 June 1986 with "Innamoratissimo" sequenced as the tenth track, following Rota's "Adelante". In West Germany, "Innamoratissimo" was released on the Teldec label as a 12-inch single and featured "Innamoratissimo (The In Crowd Mix)", the same version as on Bambini Forever, as the A-side.

== Cover versions ==
In 2014, Italian singer Syria did a pop take on the song, that was included on her tenth studio album Syria 10.

== Track listing and formats ==
- Italian 7-inch single

A. "Innamoratissimo (Tu che fai battere forte il mio cuore)" – 4:00
B. "Gli parlerò di te" – 4:18

- German 7-inch single

A. "Innamoratissimo (Tu che fai battere forte il mio cuore)" – 3:50
B. "Gli parlerò di te" – 4:18

- German 12-inch maxi-single

A. "Innamoratissimo" (The 'In-Crowd' Mix) – 5:43
B. "Innamoratissimo" (X-Tended Version) – 5:31

== Credits and personnel ==
- Johnson Righeira – songwriter, vocals
- Michael Righeira – songwriter, vocals
- Carmelo La Bionda – songwriter, producer
- Michelangelo La Bionda – songwriter, producer
- Sergio Conforti – songwriter, programming
- Cristiano Minellono – songwriter
- Uli Rudolf – engineering, mixing
- Luca Orioli – programming
- Matteo Fasolino – programming
- Marco Inzadi – mastering

Credits and personnel adapted from the Bambini Forever album and 7-inch single liner notes.

== Charts ==
=== Weekly charts ===
Weekly chart performance for "Innamoratissimo"
Chart (1986)	Peak position
Italy (Musica e dischi)	9

== Sources ==
- Giannotti, Marcello (1998). Sanremo: fermate quel festival! : dietro le quinte del più popolare evento musicale italiano. Florence: Tarab. p. 243. ISBN 8886675291.
- Anselmi, Eddy (2009). Festival di Sanremo: almanacco illustrato della canzone italiana. Panini Comics. ISBN 978-8886675291.
- Giannotti, Marcello (2005). L'enciclopedia di Sanremo: 55 anni di storia del festival dalla A alla Z. Rome: Gremese Editore. p. 184. ISBN 9788884403797.
