= Vamos a la playa =

Vamos a la playa (Spanish for 'Let's go to the beach') may refer to:

- "Vamos a la playa" (Righeira song), 1983
- Vamos a la playa (Righeira album), 1989
- "Vamos a la playa" (Miranda song), 1998
