= L'estate sta finendo =

1985 single by Righeira

Single by Righeira
- Language: Italian
- B-side: "Prima dell'estate"
- Released: 20 May 1985
- Genre: Italo disco
- Length: 3:30
- Label: CGD
- Songwriters: Johnson Righeira; Michael Righeira; Carmelo La Bionda
- Producer: La Bionda

Righeira singles chronology
"Hey Mama" (1984)	"L'estate sta finendo" (1985)	"Innamoratissimo (Tu che fai battere forte il mio cuore)" (1986)

Music video
- "L'estate sta finendo" on YouTube

"L'estate sta finendo" is a song by the Italian Italo disco duo Righeira that was released as a non-album single in May 1985. It was written by singers Johnson Righeira and Michael Righeira and producer Carmelo La Bionda. Released as the duo's fifth single in 1985 on the record label CGD, it reached number one in Italy. It was the winning song at the Festivalbar in 1985 as the most popular song of the summer.

Football chants based on the song are popularly sung by football fans in many European clubs. The chants are referred to as "Un giorno all'improvviso" from their opening line in Italy, and in English clubs it is known as "Allez Allez Allez" from its chorus.

== Background ==
The song was written by the duo Johnson Righeira and Michael Righeira, and Carmelo La Bionda of the group La Bionda. It was produced by Carmelo and Michelangelo La Bionda and released under the label CGD Dischi. The song reached number one in Italy in August 1985 where it stayed for two weeks.

The song was the winning song at the Festivalbar in 1985 as the most-played jukebox song of the summer nationwide in Italy that year.

== Commercial performance ==
The song reached a peak of number 35 in Germany, where it remained for one week, before spending a total of 10 weeks on the chart. On the Swiss Singles Chart, "L'estate sta finendo" debuted at number 23 in the issue dated 1 September 1985. After three weeks, the song reached number 18, remaining there for one week. In Italy, the song spent two consecutive weeks at the top of the Musica e dischi charts.

== As football chant ==
The use of the song as football chant has its origin in L'Aquila, a city hit by an earthquake in 2009. Righi performed the song for a concert in the city a few years later, this song was picked up afterwards by the ultras of the city's football club L'Aquila Calcio 1927 called the Red-Blue Eagles, who used it as a chant that starts with the line "Un giorno all'improvviso" (one sudden day). Their chant was adopted by fans of other Italian clubs such as Genoa, Juventus, and Napoli, and then spread to other clubs in Europe such as Atlético Madrid, Rangers and Porto.

The chant by Porto fans going to a UEFA Europa League match in 2016 against Borussia Dortmund was noticed by Liverpool fans Phil Howard and Liam Malone, who created their own version as "Allez Allez Allez". Jamie Webster, who heard the chant during Liverpool's match against Porto, then sang and recorded a version. It became popular during Liverpool's 2017–18 UEFA Champions League campaign, especially after a win against Manchester City in the quarter final. The song reached number 39 on the UK Singles Downloads Chart. This version has since been adapted for use by fans of a number of clubs in English football.

== Track listing and formats ==
- Italian 7-inch single

A. "L'estate sta finendo" – 3:30
B. "Prima dell'estate" – 3:30

- Italian 12-inch single

A. "L'estate sta finendo" – 5:02
B1. "Prima dell'estate" – 2:25
B2. "L'estate sta finendo" – 3:45

- German 7-inch single

A. "L'estate sta finendo" – 3:48
B. "Prima dell'estate" – 2:58

- Dutch 7-inch single

A. "L'estate sta finendo" – 3:45
B. "Prima dell'estate" – 2:52

== Credits and personnel ==
- Johnson Righeira – songwriter, vocals
- Michael Righeira – songwriter, vocals
- Carmelo La Bionda – songwriter, producer
- Michelangelo La Bionda – producer
- Guido Harari – cover art, photographer

Credits and personnel adapted from the 7-inch single liner notes.

== Charts ==
=== Weekly charts ===
Chart (1985)	Peak position
Italy (Musica e dischi)	1
Switzerland (Schweizer Hitparade)	18
West Germany (GfK)	35

=== Year-end charts ===
Chart (1985)	Position
Italy	9

== Certifications and sales ==
Certifications and sales for "L'estate sta finendo"
Region	Certification	Certified units/sales
Italy (FIMI)	Gold	300,000

== See also ==
- List of number-one hits of 1985 (Italy)

== Sources ==
- Salvatori, Dario (2001). Dizionario delle canzoni italiane. Rome: Elle U Multimedia. p. 137. ISBN 978-8888169019.
