= List of number-one hits of 1983 (Italy) =

This is a list of number-one songs in 1983 on the Italian charts compiled weekly by the Italian Hit Parade Singles Chart compiled weekly by the FIMI.

== Chart history ==
=== Songs ===
Issue date	Song	Artist(s)	Ref.
January 1	"Hard to Say I'm Sorry"	Chicago	
January 8	"Words"	F. R. David	
January 15	"Carletto"	Corrado	
January 22	"Carletto"	Corrado	
January 29	"Carletto"	Corrado	
February 5	"Carletto"	Corrado	
February 12	"Carletto"	Corrado	
February 19	"Carletto"	Corrado	
February 26	"Carletto"	Corrado	
March 5	"Carletto"	Corrado	
March 12	"Vacanze Romane"	Matia Bazar	
March 19	"L'Italiano"	Toto Cutugno	
March 26	"Vacanze Romane"	Matia Bazar	
April 2	"Vacanze Romane"	Matia Bazar	
April 9	"Vacanze Romane"	Matia Bazar	
April 16	"Vacanze Romane"	Matia Bazar	
April 23	"Chi Chi Chi Co Co Co"	Pippo Franco	
April 30	"Vacanze Romane"	Matia Bazar	
May 7	"Vacanze Romane"	Matia Bazar	
May 14	"Chi Chi Chi Co Co Co"	Pippo Franco	
May 21	"Billie Jean"	Michael Jackson	
May 28	"Billie Jean"	Michael Jackson	
June 4	"Billie Jean"	Michael Jackson	
June 11	"Billie Jean"	Michael Jackson	
June 18	"Billie Jean"	Michael Jackson	
June 25	"Billie Jean"	Michael Jackson	
July 2	"Billie Jean"	Michael Jackson	
July 9	"Spiagge"	Renato Zero	
July 16	"Spiagge"	Renato Zero	
July 23	"Spiagge"	Renato Zero	
July 30	"Spiagge"	Renato Zero	
August 6	"Spiagge"	Renato Zero	
August 13	"Spiagge"	Renato Zero	
August 20	"Vamos a la playa"	Righeira	
August 27	"Vamos a la playa"	Righeira	
September 3	"Vamos a la playa"	Righeira	
September 10	"Vamos a la playa"	Righeira	
September 17	"Vamos a la playa"	Righeira	
September 24	"Vamos a la playa"	Righeira	
October 1	"Vamos a la playa"	Righeira	
October 8	"Moonlight Shadow"	Mike Oldfield	
October 15	"Moonlight Shadow"	Mike Oldfield	
October 22	"Moonlight Shadow"	Mike Oldfield	
October 29	"Moonlight Shadow"	Mike Oldfield	
November 5	"Flashdance"	Irene Cara	
November 12	"Flashdance"	Irene Cara	
November 19	"Flashdance"	Irene Cara	
November 26	"Flashdance"	Irene Cara	
December 3	"Flashdance"	Irene Cara	
December 10	"Flashdance"	Irene Cara	
December 17	"Flashdance"	Irene Cara	
December 24	"Flashdance"	Irene Cara	
December 31	"Flashdance"	Irene Cara	

== Number-one artists ==
=== Songs ===
Position	Artist	Weeks #1
1	Irene Cara	9
2	Corrado	8
3	Matia Bazar	7
3	Michael Jackson	7
3	Righeira	7
4	Renato Zero	6
5	Mike Oldfield	4
6	Pippo Franco	2
7	Chicago	1
7	F. R. David	1
7	Toto Cutugno	1
