= Neja (singer) =

Italian singer (born 1972)

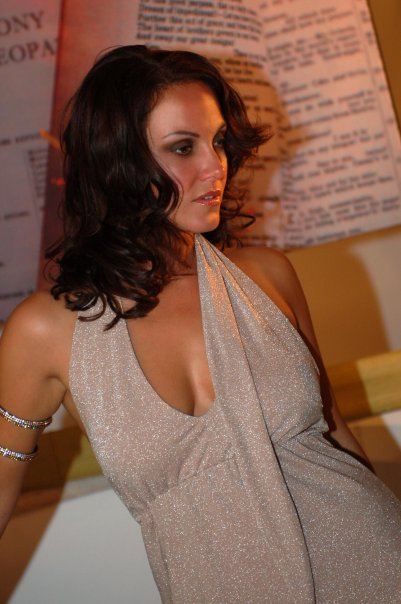

Background information
- Born: Agnese Cacciola; August 15, 1972 (age 54)
- Origin: Turin, Italy
- Genres: Dance-pop, pop jazz
- Occupation: Singer
- Years active: 1996–present
- Labels: Universal Music, SAIFAM, New Music International

Agnese Cacciola (born August 15, 1972), best known as Neja, is an Italian dance and pop-jazz singer.

== Background ==
Born in Turin, as a child Cacciola studied piano and, as a teenager, she started singing jazz and gospel. In 1996 she released her first single as Neja, "Hallo", followed in 1998 by "Restless" and "Shock" which both charted in several dance charts across Europe. In 1999 with her song "The Game" she participated in Festivalbar and won the Un disco per l'estate festival. In 2008, the album Acousticlub marked a stylistic turn with electronic arrangements replaced by jazz and acoustic sounds. As of 2013, she sold over 4 million records.

== Discography ==
Album

- 1999 – The Game
- 2003 – Hot Stuff
- 2004 – First Flight (EP)
- 2008 – AcoustiClub
- 2009 – 133SushiClub
- 2010 – 133SushiClub vol. II
- 2011 – 133SushiClub vol. III
- 2013 – Neja Vù

Singles

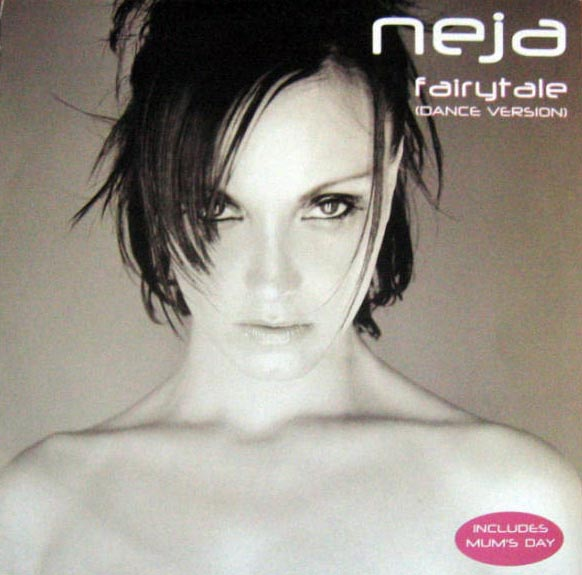
Cover of the single "Fairytale"

- 1997 – "Hallo"
- 1998 – "Restless"
- 1998 – "Shock!"
- 1999 – "The Game"
- 2000 – "Fairytale"
- 2000 – "Singin' Nanana"
- 2000 – "Mum's Day"
- 2001 – "Time Flies"
- 2001 – "Back 4 the Morning"
- 2002 – "Looking 4 Something"
- 2003 – "Hot Stuff"
- 2003 – "To the Music"
- 2005 – "Who's Gonna Be?"
- 2007 – "Catwalk"
- 2008 – "Sweet Dreams"
- 2008 – "Destiny”
- 2009 – "Loving You" (WAG011 feat. Neja)
- 2010 – "Sorry" (Lanfranchi & Farina feat. Neja)
- 2011 – "Walking on a Dream" (O2 feat. Neja)
- 2012 – "Sun has come again"
- 2013 – "The Role of Love"

== Chart history ==
Year	Song	Belgium	Brazil	France	Iceland	Italy	UK	Sweden
1998	"Restless"	32		35		1	47	58
1999	"Shock!"				4	2		
1999	"The Game"					7		
2000	"Fairytale"					24		
2000	"Singin' Nanana"					21		
2001	"Time Flies"					26		
2003	"Back 4 The Morning"		39			45		
2003	"Hot Stuff"					32		
