= List of number-one hits of 1973–1980 (Argentina) =

This is a list of the songs that reached number one in Argentina between 1973 and 1980, according to Billboard magazine with data provided by Rubén Machado's "Escalera a la fama".

== 1973 ==
Issue date	Song	Artist(s)
January 13	"Ahora que soy libre"	Juan Marcelo
January 27	"Ayer volé"	Juan Eduardo
February 24	"Fresa salvaje"	Camilo Sesto
June 9	"La montaña"	Roberto Carlos
June 23	"Hearts of Stone"	The Blue Ridge Rangers
June 30	"Mon amour, mi bien, ma femme"	Sabú
August 11	"La distancia"	Roberto Carlos
August 18	"La distancia"	Roberto Carlos
November 24	"Mon amour, sors de chez toi"	Salvatore Adamo

== 1974 ==
Issue date	Song	Artist(s)
March 23	"Ma che sera stasera"	Gianni Nazzaro
April 20	"Alle porte del sole"	Gigliola Cinquetti
August 10	"Nosotros dos y nadie más"	Quique Villanueva
October 12	"El valle y el volcán"	Jairo

== 1975 ==
Issue date	Song	Artist(s)
November 26	"Melina"	Camilo Sesto

== 1976 ==
Issue date	Song	Artist(s)
February 12	"Cara de tramposo"	Cacho Castaña

== 1977 ==
Issue date	Song	Artist(s)
May 26	"Falso amor"	Los Bukis
June 9	"Ojos sin luz"	Pomada
June 30	"Ojos sin luz"	Pomada
July 7	"Ojos sin luz"	Pomada
August 20	"Quiero tu vida"	Luciana
September 8	"Con el viento a tu favor"	Camilo Sesto
September 29	"El reloj"	Los Pasteles Verdes
October 20	"Morir al lado de mi amor"	Demis Roussos
December 7	"Morir al lado de mi amor"	Demis Roussos
December 29	"Cara de gitana"	Daniel Magal

== 1978 ==
Issue date	Song	Artist(s)
January 19	"Una lágrima y un recuerdo"	Grupo Miramar/Los Nómadas

== 1980 ==
Issue date	Song	Artist(s)
August 30	"Funkytown"	Lipps Inc.
September 6	"D.I.S.C.O."	Patrick & Sue Timmel
October 11	"D.I.S.C.O."	Patrick & Sue Timmel
October 18	"Shandi"	Kiss

== See also ==
- 1973 in music
- 1974 in music
- 1975 in music
- 1976 in music
- 1977 in music
- 1978 in music
- 1980 in music
