= Restless (Neja song) =

Single by Neja

from the album The Game
- B-side: "Remix"
- Released: 3 February 1998
- Genre: Dance; eurodance; house
- Length: 4:05
- Label: BMG; LUP Records; ZYX Music
- Songwriters: Names; Neja; Timmity
- Producer: Alex Bagnoli

Neja singles chronology
"Hallo" (1997)	"Restless" (1998)	"Shock!" (1998)

Music video
- "Restless" on YouTube

"Restless" (also known as "Restless (I Know You Know)" is a Eurodance song by Italian singer Neja, released in February 1998, as the second single from her debut album, The Game (1999). Producer/musician Alex Bagnoli produced it for Pippo Landro's Milan-based indie New Music and Neja co-wrote it with Bagnoli. It became a European hit in the summer of '98, peaking at number-one in Italy in May same year. Additionally, it peaked at number 18 in Denmark and was a top 40 hit in Belgium and France. On the Eurochart Hot 100, the single reached number 42 in July 1998.

In 2015, a new version of "Restless" was released, with remixes by Des3ett and by Farlan. In April 2018, a new official remix of the track was released by Italian female record producer and remixer EVO-K and published by record label SAIFAM.

== Critical reception ==
Dominic Pride from Billboard wrote, "With stomping rhythms and scorching vocals, "Restless" by Neja recalls the glory days of another Italian global house hit, Black Box's "Ride on Time"." Pan-European magazine Music & Media complimented it as "a strong pop song dressed up for the '90s with a disco bassline and massive vocal harmonies. The radio edit comes with a hint of a garage sound and the type of chorus that usually means "major sales"."

After topping the singles chart in Italy, Music & Media wrote, "Earlier this year, this track was one of the biggest hits in Italy, where it topped the Musica & Dischi singles chart a couple of months ago. Now it's gaining a foothold elsewhere in Europe. Restless is the kind of track that works as well on the dancefloor as on the airwaves. The first country to embrace the track on a large scale outside Italy was Denmark, where the local BMG office's belief in the track was an important factor."

Jan Brodde, music coordinator at CHR station Radio Uptown/Copenhagen explained, "We playlisted it simply because it was easy to do so... it's got an incredibly catchy refrain, and it seems that our listeners agree with us because they've been inundating us with requests and queries-for example, they want to find out if there is an album on the horizon. At the moment we've got the song in A-rotation, which means that we play it 20-24 times a week during all dayparts, and-although we like the remixes-we're sticking to the radio edit."

== Music video ==
The accompanying music video for "Restless" was directed by Italian director Francesco Fei and was shot in a villa in Turin, Italy.

== Track listing ==
- CD single, Europe (1998)
1. "Restless" (Bum Bum Radio Edit) – 4:04
2. "Restless" (Bum Bum Club Mix) – 5:25
- CD maxi, Europe (1998)
1. "Restless" (Bum Bum Radio Edit) – 4:05
2. "Restless" (Bum Bum Club Mix) – 5:25
3. "Restless" (Extended Version) – 4:45
4. "Restless" (Nite Shadow Club Remix) – 6:16

== Charts ==
Weekly chart performance for "Restless"
Chart (1998)	Peak position
Belgium (Ultratop Wallonia)	32
Denmark (IFPI)	18
Europe (Eurochart Hot 100)	42
France (SNEP)	35
Italy (Musica e dischi)	1
Italy Airplay (Music & Media)	6
Scotland (OCC)	48
Sweden (Sverigetopplistan)	58
UK Singles (OCC)	47
UK Dance (OCC)	31

Annual chart rankings for "Restless"
Chart (1998)	Rank
Europe Border Breakers (Music & Media)	35
