= Bianca Surf / Photoni =

1980 single by Johnson Righeira

"Bianca Surf" / "Photoni"

Single by Johnson Righeira
- Language: Italian
- B-side: "Photoni"
- Released: 1980
- Studio: Italian Records (Bologna)
- Genre: Rock; pop
- Label: Italian
- Songwriter: Johnson Righeira
- Producer: Giulio Tedeschi

Johnson Righeira singles chronology
"Bianca Surf" / "Photoni" (1980)	"Ripigliati!" (1997)

Audio
- "Bianca Surf" on YouTube

"Bianca Surf / Photoni" is the debut single by Italian singer Johnson Righeira, released in 1980, under the label Italian Records.

== Recording ==
Recording took place at Italian Records Studios in Bologna in 1980. Both songs were played by the local punk band Skiantos. The basic track consisted of Righi on vocals, Luti Chroma on backing vocals, Carlo Capelli on synthesizer, Leonardo Grezzi on drums, Andrea Dalla Valle and Gianni Bolelli on guitars and Franco Villani on bass guitar. The saxophone solo on "Bianca Surf" was played by Michele Bettinelli.

== Release ==
"Bianca Surf" was released in 1980 in Italy, with "Photoni" as the B-side. It was Righi's debut single as a solo artist. "Bianca Surf" has also appeared on Righi's 2006 compilation album, Ex punk, ora venduto. The single was re-released in 1981 on the CGD label.

== Track listing and formats ==
- Digital single (2019)
1. "Bianca Surf" – 3:36
2. "Photoni" – 3:54

== Credits and personnel ==
- Johnson Righeira – songwriter, vocals
- Luti Chroma – vocals
- Giulio Tedeschi – producer
- Carlo Capelli – engineering
- Oderso Rubini – engineering, mixing
- Enzo Russo – cover art, photographer

Credits and personnel adapted from the 7-inch single liner notes.
