= Lanfranchi & Farina =

- Also known as: Desaparecidos, Farlan
- Born: Brescia, Italy
- Genres: House, dance, progressive house
- Occupation(s): Record producer, DJ
- Years active: 2007–present
- Labels: Saifam, Universal Music, Kontor, Blanco Y Negro
- Website: www.lanfranchiandfarina.it

Lanfranchi & Farina (born 1977) is an Italian progressive house, electro house and house producer and DJ duo.

== Musical career ==
Lanfranchi & Farina, a.k.a. Stefano Lanfranchi and Simone Farina, born in 1977 in Brescia (Italy), actually live in Verona (Italy).

Their productions and remixed rocked thousands of worldwide dancefloors, with an eclectic sound, fresh and summery, recognized like the projects Lanfranchi & Farina and Desaparecidos. In 2008 Stefano Lanfranchi, Raf Marchesini and Simone Farina produced Lanfranchi & Marchesini's song "Boys & Girls", that hit the European charts and especially in French and Italy, which became a smash hit that summer on Universal Music France.

The same year a song was born that would become a big evergreen of the dance floor in the world... about the project Desaparecidos vs. Walter Master J Ibiza, this time remixed by Marchesini & Farina, followed by the follow-up of 2009 Fiesta Loca. Also in 2009, Stefano Lanfranchi & Raf Marchesini, realized the major version of the project 2Someone "Love Me" by Vincenzo Callea, a member of the Ti.Pi.Cal, a big hit in Italy. Realized in 2009, with the queen of the dance Neja the song Sorry, you will hit the 26 position on the official Dancedirectory club chart. Another song was released in the summer of 2010, "Sun and Love", a hymn to love and fun, which hit in Europe and in South America territory, inevitable today in the summer selection of every DJ who loves commercial music. In 2014, the song was chosen by Corona Beer as a soundtrack for an advertising campaign in the United States.

Simone Farina in 2012 collaborated with the brothers VINAI (the Italian duo most famous in EDM), with the song "Make Me Feeling". They had years of productions and successes (even under different pseudonyms, including Farlan, Noize Criminal, LFP, and Gayo). Their last song was made in September 2014, "It's Ok", with Swiss DJ/producer Dj Antoine, on the label Kontor Germany. The track was also included in the last album of Dj Antoine, We Are the Party, and a radio single was planned.

The duo also mixes and selects from different editions the tracks of two historical compilation in Italy, Los Cuarenta and Suburbia. Lanfranchi & Farina are always looking (with the collaboration of SAIFAM, the largest independent Italian label), for new talent to be included in their roster. As A&R to the projects "Tom Boxer & Morena feat J Warner - Deep In Love" (platinum with over 35,000 downloads and 31 million views on YouTube) and "Joy Santos - Caliente" gold record with over 30 million views. In 2015 they founded the new independent label Starlight Records, destined to become a reference for the club made in Italy.

== Discography ==
=== Albums ===
- 2010 - Desaparecidos - Fiesta Loca (Universal Music France)

=== Singles, remixes and EPs ===
- 2008 - Desaparecidos vs. Walter Master J- Ibiza (Marchesini & Farina Rmx) (Link Records / Universal France)
- 2009 - Lanfranchi & Marchesini - "Boys And Girls" (Stop & Go / Universal France)
- 2009 - 2Someone - Love Me (Lanfranchi & Marchesini Rmx) (White / Ego music)
- 2009 - Sergio Mauri - I Gotta Feel It (Stop & Go / Saifam)
- 2010 - Lanfranchi & Farina feat. Neja - Sorry (Stop & Go/Universal)
- 2010 - Desaparecidos - Fiesta Loca (Marchesini & Farina Rmx) (Link Records / Universal France)
- 2010 - Marchesini & Farina vs. Max B. - Majestade Real (Link Records / HypeTraxx Record)
- 2011 - 2Someone - Star Unkind (Lanfranchi & Farina Rmx) (White / Do it Yourself)
- 2011 - Lanfranchi & Farina feat. Ray Johnson - Sun and Love (Stop & Go/Serial Records)
- 2011 - Lanfranchi & Farina feat. Richard Gray - Illusion of my mind (Stop & Go/Teta Music)
- 2011 - Sammy Love feat. Irene Arerè - Torcida (Link Records / Saifam)
- 2011 - Desaparecidos - La Noche (Link Records / Future Play)
- 2011 - 69 Lovers vs. Lanfranchi & Farina - Think (Stop & Go)
- 2012 - Lanfranchi & Farina vs. Walter Master J - My Freedom (Stop & Go/Teta Music)
- 2012 - Sissoko vs. Walter Master J - Party On The Beach (Link Records / Saifam)
- 2012 - Desaparecidos feat. Big Ali - Go Crazy (Link Records / Future Play-Universal France)
- 2012 - Lanfranchi & Farina - Sky meets Bittersweet Symphony (Stop & Go)
- 2012 - Gajo - Pipari (Link Records / Saifam)
- 2012 - Ian Carey feat. Mandry Ventrice - Let Loose (Lanfranchi & Farina Rmx) (Stop & Go / Spinnin Records)
- 2012 - Desaparecidos - Me Gusta (Link Records / Future Play)
- 2012 - Noize Criminal - Put Your Hands Up (House Traxx / Saifam)
- 2012 - Gayo vs. L.f.p. - Work (Link Records / Saifam)
- 2012 - L.f.p. - El Comanchero (Stop & Go / Saifam)
- 2012 - Lanfranchi & Cue&Play - What a Feeling (Stop & Go / Saifam)
- 2013 - Lanfranchi & Farina vs. VMC - Miami (Stop & Go/Teta Music)
- 2013 - Desaparecidos - Danser (Link Records / Future Play)
- 2013 - Farlan - Strawberry Kiss (Stop & Go / Roster Music)
- 2013 - Lanfranchi & Farina feat. Mike P - Party Anthem for life (Stop & Go)
- 2013 - Desaparecidos - Cadavez (Link Records / Future Play-Universal France)
- 2013 - Redrop - Mystery meets Like a Prayer (House Traxx / Saifam)
- 2014 - Noize Criminal - The Bad Trumpet (House Traxx / Saifam)
- 2014 - Don Dragon - Carillion (House Traxx / Saifam)
- 2014 - Farlan - Jump Around (Godzilla Music / Blanco Y Negro Spain)
- 2014 - Dj Antoine feat. Mihai, TomE & Lanfranchi - It's Ok (Kontor Music)
- 2015 - Desaparecidos vs. Lanfranchi & Farina and Marchesini - Gipsy Song (Godzilla Music / Future Play-Universal France)
- 2015 - Legion of Sound - Live your Life (Stop & Go / Saifam)
- 2015 - Mihai & Farlan - Hands Up (Stop & Go / Saifam)
- 2015 - Tom Boxer & Morena - Trompeta (Lanfranchi & Farina Re-Edit) (Tom Boxer Music Rec / Saifam)
- 2015 - Rojal4 feat. Axel Vee - What To Do (Godzilla Music / Saifam)
- 2015 - Apocalyptho - Again and Again (Saifam / Future Play-Universal France)
- 2015 - Andrea Paci vs. Alex Dj feat. Mathieu - Komsi Komsa (Godzilla Music / Saifam)
