= Jamie Webster =

English singer (born 1994)

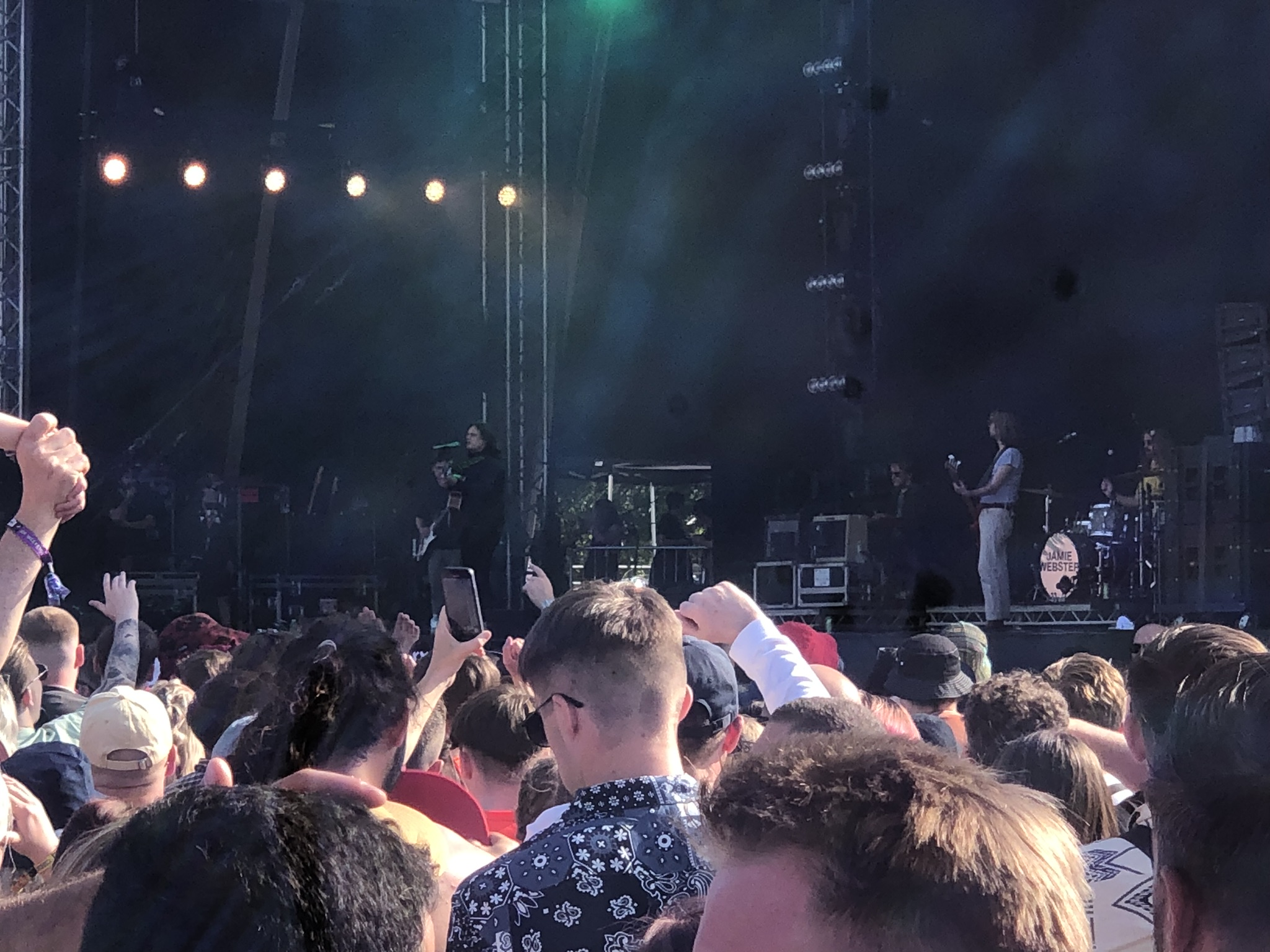
- Webster performing at Neighbourhood Weekender in 2023

Background information
- Born: 18 April 1994 (age 32); Norris Green, Liverpool, England
- Genres: English folk, British folk rock, acoustic folk
- Instruments: Vocals, guitar
- Years active: 2017–present
- Labels: Modern Sky UK, Live Her Now
- Website: www.jamiewebstermusic.com

Jamie Webster (born 18 April 1994) is an English singer, songwriter and musician. He has released four studio albums, as well as writing music related to Liverpool F.C.

== Early life ==
Born in Liverpool, Webster worked as an electrician, and initially sang cover versions in local pubs in the city's centre. He said: "One day, I was playing a cover of 'Mrs Robinson', and someone in the crowd turned the words to Jordan Henderson, and it started organically just like that with people in the room. The club then rang me and asked if I could do some Liverpool songs for LFC TV".

== Career ==
=== Liverpool F.C. ===
Webster's shows have become synonymous with Liverpool F.C. and their supporter culture, with The Guardian describing him as "the semi official musician of the football club". Webster began headlining fan affiliated appearances at UEFA Champions League final box parks in Kyiv and Madrid in 2019 to 60,000 fans. After a video of him playing the song "Allez Allez Allez", his reworking of Italo disco classic "L'estate sta finendo" by Righeira, went viral in 2018, the song became the soundtrack to the team's European successes under Jürgen Klopp. Webster performed for the players at their after party following their victory at the 2019 UEFA Champions League Final alongside Chelcee Grimes and host Colin Murray. Jürgen Klopp himself surprised Webster by appearing at a Supporters Club performance in Michigan and joined in with a rendition of "Allez Allez Allez", and Webster has recorded duets with Liverpool players past and present such as Jamie Carragher and Alisson Becker as well as appearing at events with his childhood heroes such as Ian Rush, Robbie Fowler and Bruce Grobbelaar. His song "This Place" was used by Sky Sports to soundtrack the trophy lift when Liverpool won the Premier League title in 2020. Webster has also been a frequent guest on The Anfield Wrap.

Webster has also performed to crowds in places such as New Delhi, and supported established Liverpool band Cast, but was disappointed at having to miss out on a Glastonbury Festival since it was postponed twice due to the COVID-19 pandemic. The Liverpool Echo named Webster the 11th most-influential Merseysider in its 2020 Power List. Lyrics from his song "Something's Gotta Give", "How can you tell me that this is where it's at / When all the clowns are calling the shots?", have been quoted on social media with people using the song to channel their frustration at politicians.

=== Recordings ===
In October 2020, his debut album We Get By, released on Modern Sky UK, reached a peak of number 6 on the UK Albums Chart, and he became the inaugural number-one artist in the newly formed UK Official Folk Album Charts, ahead of Laura Marling, Kate Rusby, and Levellers. Also in October 2020, Boss, a live album of Webster singing football songs, charted in the folk chart top 10.

On 3 May 2022, Webster announced he would be performing on the Left Field stage at Glastonbury Festival 2022. He also stated he would also be there as a fan as well as an act and expressed his gratitude to his fans who had made this happen.

In 2023, the track "Weekend In Paradise" from the album We Get By was certified Gold by the British Phonographic Industry (BPI). His third studio album 10 For The People was released on 2 February 2024. His fourth studio album Running Round the Sun was released on 4 September 2026.

== Discography ==
=== Albums ===
List of studio albums with selected details
Title	Album details	Peak chart positions		Certifications
Title	Album details	UK	IRE	Certifications
We Get By	Released: 21 August 2020; Label: Modern Sky; Formats: LP, CD, digital download, streaming	6	26	BPI: Silver
Moments	Released: 28 January 2022; Label: Modern Sky; Formats: LP, CD, digital download, streaming	3	—	
10 for the People	Released: 2 February 2024; Label: Modern Sky; Formats: LP, CD, digital download, streaming	2	94	
Running Round the Sun	Released: 4 September 2026; Label: Modern Sky; Formats: LP, CD, digital download, streaming	10	—	
