= Johnson Righeira =

Italian singer, songwriter, musician, record producer and actor (born 1960)

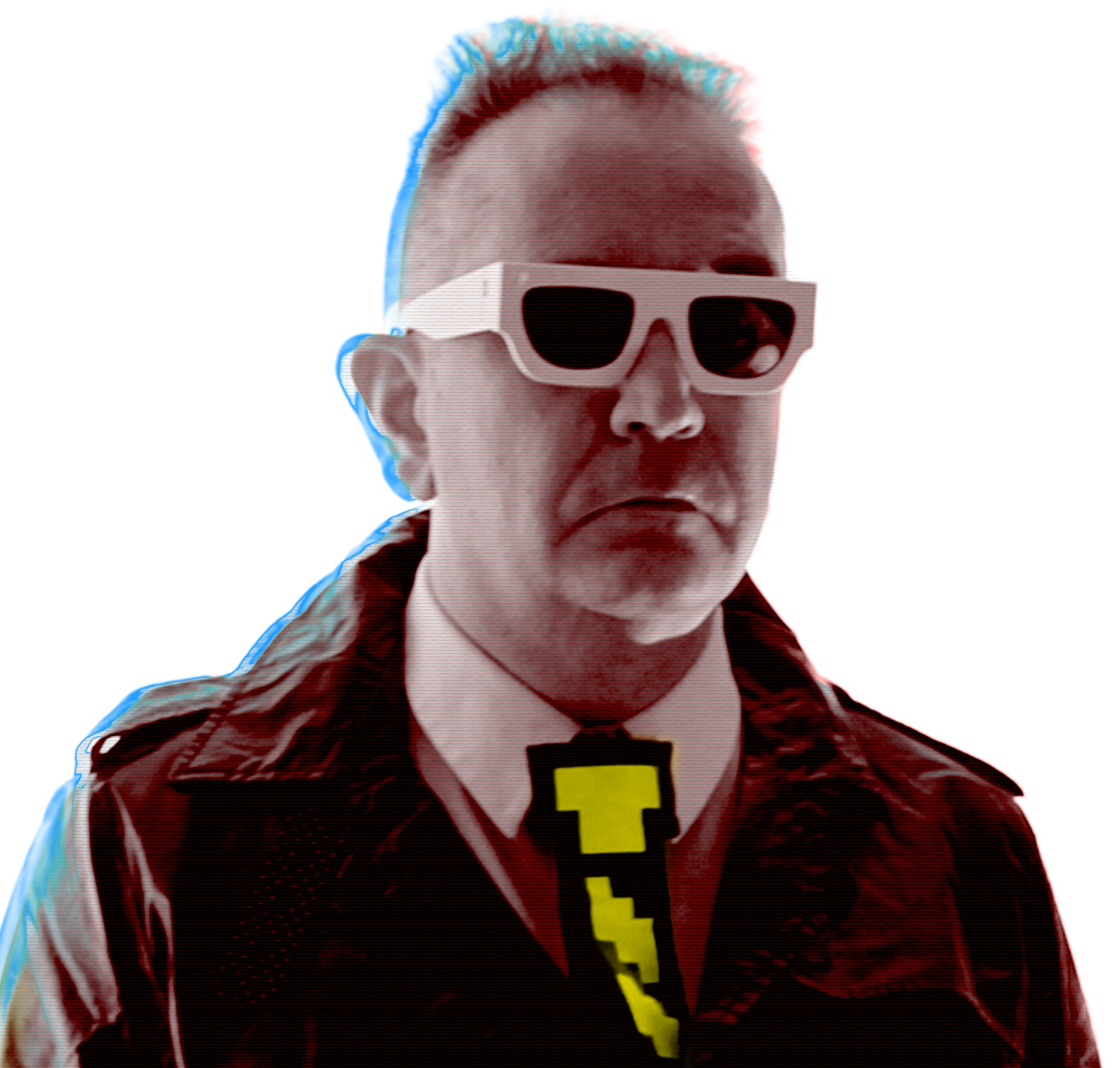
- Righi in 2010
- Born: Stefano Righi; 9 September 1960 (age 65); Turin, Piedmont, Italy
- Other name: Aspro Marinetti
- Occupations: Singer; songwriter; musician; record producer; actor
- Years active: 1980–present
- Musical career
- Genres: Italo disco; synth-pop; new wave; electronic; Italo house
- Instruments: Vocals; keyboards
- Labels: A&M; CGD; EMI; Kottolengo; RCA; SAIFAM; Teldec
- Formerly of: Righeira

Stefano Righi (born 9 September 1960), known professionally as Johnson Righeira, is an Italian singer, songwriter, musician, record producer and actor. He is best known as the lead vocalist and primary lyricist of the Italo disco duo Righeira. After the duo disbanded for the second time in 2016, he pursued a solo career and founded the record label Kottolengo Recordings.

In 1980, Righi debuted as a solo artist with the single "Bianca Surf". In 1983, he formed the music duo Righeira with Stefano Rota.

== Early life ==
Johnson Righeira was born Stefano Righi on 9 September 1960 in the Borgo Vittoria district of Turin, to Freddie and Maria Teresa Righi. Righi has a younger sister named Laura.

In 1968, when Righi was 8, his family moved to the Barriera di Milano district.

Righi attended Albert Einstein Scientific High School in Turin.

He was influenced by Italian folk music, and Gipo Farassino was one of his schoolboy idols; "Vamos a la playa" and "L'estate sta finendo" were written with inspiration from Farassino.

== Career ==
=== 1980–1983 ===
At the age of twenty in 1980, Righi released his debut single, "Bianca Surf / Photoni". The single was re-recorded and released in 1981 under the CGD record label. Righi had signed a contract with CGD even before Righeira was officially founded in 1983, but he had met his friend and future duo member Stefano Rota during his time attending Albert Einstein Scientific High School in Turin. By New Year's Eve of 1981, Righi and a couple of friends of his had visited a friend's music studio in Florence when Righi came up with an idea of a song called "Vamos a la playa". The song was inspired by the 1960s and was meant to be a beach song which was post-atomic and had an electric sound to it. "Vamos a la playa" was later released in 1983 as a single and on the album Righeira when Righi was a part of Righeira and became a smash hit which managed to sell millions of copies worldwide.

=== 1983–1992, 1999–2016: Righeira ===
In 1983, Righi formed the duo Righeira with his former schoolmate, Stefano Rota. They became known as Michael and Johnson Righeira, after deciding to become "musical brothers".

In the same year, they released their first album, Righeira, produced by La Bionda. "Vamos a la playa" was extracted from the list but became a hit during the summer of that year. After the release of the single, Michael Righeira was called to military service. Later, the single "No Tengo Dinero" was released.

In 1985, the album Bambini Forever was released. The following year, Righeira participated in the Sanremo Music Festival with the song "Innamoratissimo". In 1987, the duo took part in the Zecchino d'Oro song competition with the song "Annibale" and in 1988, they released their latest single "Compañero". Unnoticed in 1992, the album Uno, Zero, Centomila was released. In 1999 the duo got together and in 2001 released a new version of "Vamos a la playa".

Righi's debut solo album, Ex punk, ora venduto, was released in 2006, via the Astroman record label.

Mondovisione was the duo's last recorded album, which obtained moderate success when it was released in May 2007.

=== 2016–present ===
In 2019, he released the dance single "Formentera" with La Bionda.

In 2020, Righi founded his own record label, Kottolengo Recordings. The record label is based in Canavese, Italy.

On 23 July 2021, Righi released an electro-krautrock version of "Vamos a la playa", remixed by musician and record producer Gaudi, marking the 40th anniversary since the release of the single.

== Personal life ==
=== Drugs ===
On 19 November 1993, Righi was arrested in Padua along with 37 others, for drug dealing. He ended up in prison together with his then-girlfriend Silvia Lunardi. He remained in prison for five months until the trial cleared him completely of the drug charges. In 1995, the Italian newspaper la Repubblica reported that Righi and Lunardi were sentenced to one year and four months of imprisonment as well as a 2 million lira fine. Righi later described the situation in an interview, "The world collapsed on me, I felt like I was in a dead-end street ... my cellmates helped me a lot."

=== Politics and activism ===
Stefano Righi is politically aligned to the left. His friend, Marco Rizzo, is the leader of the Communist Party, to which he acted as a campaigner during the 2016 Turin municipal election.

=== Football ===
Righi is a keen football fan and has publicly professed support for Juventus FC and has also shown favour for Royale Union Saint-Gilloise. In 2012, he became a fan of the Belgian football club, saying in an interview: "I was in Brussels for a few days and I wanted to watch football. My friends then told me about Royale Union Saint-Gilloise. I fell in love straight away. The atmosphere was so old school ... it was just wonderful—just like when I went to the stadium with my father for the first time as a child."

== Discography ==
Studio albums

- Ex punk, ora venduto (2006)
- Italiani (2013) (with Gianluigi Carlone & Giorgio Li Calzi)

Righeira

- Righeira (1983)
- Bambini Forever (1986)
- Uno, Zero, Centomila (1992)
- Mondovisione (2007)

== Filmography ==
=== Film ===
Year	Title	Role	Notes
2008	Calibro70	Himself	Short film
2008	Tanzen mit Righeira	Himself	Documentary
2014	Sexy Shop	Maniacal Customer	
2017	Gipo, lo zingaro di Barriera	Himself	Documentary

=== Television ===
Year	Title	Role	Notes
2009	Nel nome del male	Malarico	TV series
2013	Nord Sud Ovest Est - Tormentoni on the Road	Himself	TV series, 1 episode

== Sources ==
- Culicchia, Giuseppe (2020). Turin ist unser Haus: Reise durch die zwanzig Zimmer der Stadt. Verlag Klaus Wagenbach. ISBN 978-3-8031-2823-2.
- Culicchia, Giuseppe (2015). Torino è casa nostra. Editori Laterza. ISBN 9788858117194.
- Roberts, David (2006). British Hit Singles & Albums. London: Guinness World Records Limited. p. 463. ISBN 1-904994-10-5.
