= No tengo dinero (Righeira song) =

1983 single by Righeira

- Artwork for the French vinyl single release

Single by Righeira

from the album Righeira
- Language: Spanish
- B-side: "Dinero Scratch"; "Tanzen mit Righeira"
- Released: 1983
- Genre: Italo disco
- Length: 3:38 (album version); 3:20 (single version)
- Label: CGD
- Songwriters: Michael Righeira; Carmelo La Bionda; Michelangelo La Bionda
- Producer: La Bionda

Righeira singles chronology
"Vamos a la playa" (1983)	"No tengo dinero" (1983)	"Hey Mama" (1984)

Music video
- "No tengo dinero" on YouTube

"No tengo dinero" is a song by the Italian Italo disco duo Righeira from their 1983 debut album Righeira. It was written by Michael Righeira, the duo's backing vocalist and producers Carmelo La Bionda and Michelangelo La Bionda. While not as successful as their earlier single, "Vamos a la playa", the song nonetheless achieved high popularity, hitting 12th place in Germany. Much like their previous single, the song is written in Spanish because it was considered an unusual combination with electronic pop music, and celebrating in spite of hardship (in this case poverty, as opposed to nuclear war).

== Commercial performance ==
In Italy, it reached the fifteenth position on the Musica e dischi chart.

== Music video ==
The music video for "No tengo dinero" was directed by Pierluigi de Mas, who had previously worked with Righeira in the videos for "Vamos a la playa" and "Luciano Serra pilota" (1983). The aesthetics of the video where inspired by italian futurism (the video includes footage of the Regia Aeronautica and the House with external elevators from architect Antonio Sant'Elia) and animated by rotoscopy.

== Track listing and formats ==
- Italian 7-inch single

A. "No tengo dinero" – 3:20
B. "Dinero Scratch" – 3:28

- German 7-inch single

A. "No tengo dinero" – 3:38
B. "Dinero Scratch" – 3:28

- German 12-inch maxi-single

A. "No tengo dinero" – 5:30
B. "Dinero Scratch" – 4:58

- US 12-inch single

A. "No tengo dinero" – 5:30
B. "Tanzen mit Righeira" – 5:31

== Credits and personnel ==
- Johnson Righeira – vocals
- Michael Righeira – songwriter, vocals
- Carmelo La Bionda – songwriter, producer
- Michelangelo La Bionda – songwriter, producer
- Hermann Weindorf – co-producer, arranger
- Berthold Weindorf – engineering, mixing
- Ben Fenner – engineering, mixing

Credits and personnel adapted from the Righeira album and 7-inch single liner notes.

== Charts ==
=== Weekly charts ===
Weekly chart performance for "No tengo dinero"
Chart (1983–1984)	Peak position
Argentina (Prensario)	2
Belgium (Ultratop 50 Flanders)	21
Italy (Musica e dischi)	15
Netherlands (Dutch Top 40)	10
Switzerland (Schweizer Hitparade)	20
West Germany (GfK)	12

== Bibliography ==
- Arena, James (2017). Europe's Stars of '80s Dance Pop: 32 International Music Legends Discuss Their Careers. McFarland & Company. ISBN 9781476630144.
- Bendazzi, Giannalberto (2015). Animation: A World History: Volume II: The Birth of a Style - The Three Markets. Routledge. ISBN 978-1138035324.
