= Giorgio Li Calzi =

- Born: 9 April 1965 (age 59); Turin, Italy
- Genres: Jazz; electronic music
- Occupations: Musician; composer
- Instruments: Trumpet
- Website: Official website

Giorgio Li Calzi (born 9 April 1965), is an Italian trumpeter, composer and music producer. Giorgio Li Calzi started overdubbing piano and synthesizer as a child, and in 1990 he began to play the trumpet.

His interest in improvisation using electronic instruments and effects combined with the trumpet is a clear element in his music.

== Biography ==
Li Calzi began studying trumpet in the early 1990s under the tutorship of Enrico Rava. In 1990 he won the award for Best European Composer at the Competition for Young Jazz Talents (RAI/Yves Saint Laurent (brand)) in Rome. He also worked for the advertising industry and won the award for best Italian composer for a FIAT jingle in Milan.

His first album as trumpet player was released in 1994, and he has released a further nine albums since.

In 2003 he collaborated with Wolfgang Flür, founder member of German group Kraftwerk, who sampled some tracks from the rough mix of "Sweet Home with Elena Dancing" (from Giorgio's "Tech-set" 2004 album) to include on his 7" single "I was a robot", issued in 2015 with the album "Eloquence".

In 2003 Li Calzi also collaborated with Lenine, Brazilian singer-songwriter who recorded voice and guitar for a cover recording of Janis Joplin's "Mercedes Benz". Both Wolfgang Flür and Lenine are guests on Li Calzi's 2004 "Tech-Set" album.

In 2007 he arranged his first work as a theatrical visual director, Lectio Organica I, Dracula.

His album Organum, released in 2011, features Marconi Union, Thomas Leer, Hayley Alker, Retina.it and Douglas Benford.

His most recent album ITALIANI (2013) features Gian Luigi Carlone and Johnson Righeira.

Li Calzi continues to experiment in new electronic sound forms with his trumpet, together with the Turin-based collective Audio Hacklab, Kinetik Laboratories, and Pugile, Eniac, Motor.

He is the artistic director of the CHAMOISic Festival in Chamois, the only village in Italy reachable by cable car only.

== Discography ==
=== Singles ===
- 2021 – Enjoy the Silence feat. Arto Lindsay (digital)
- 2020 – Encounters at the end of the world (with Thomas Feiner) (digital)

=== Solo albums ===
- 2024 – Chandra Candiani & Giorgio Li Calzi - La via delle nuvole (Haze-Auditorium Edizioni)
- 2022 – Frank Bretschneider & Giorgio Li Calzi - Zero Mambo (Umor Rex Records)
- 2017 – Music for Writers (Salone Internazionale del Libro Torino)
- 2017 – Giorgio Li Calzi Manuel Zigante - Solaris (Machiavelli Music)
- 2013 – Carlone Li Calzi Righeira - Italiani (Artis/Disastro Records)
- 2011 – Organum (Fonosintesi)
- 2008 – Giorgio Li Calzi + Aleksandr Nevskij (DVD, CNI Music)
- 2004 – Tech-Set (CD, Il Manifesto)
- 2000 – Autoloop (CD, BMG/Ricordi)
- 2000 – Imaginary film music (CD, Philology)
- 1997 – Santa Lucia (CD, Polo Sud)
- 1997 – Suk (CD, Philology)
- 1996 – La nuit amèricaine (CD, Philology)
- 1994 – Giorgio Li Calzi (CD, Philology)

=== As sideman ===
- 2016 – Marconi Union - Ghost stations (Just Music)
- 2016 – Healing Force Project - Perihelion Transit (Eclipsemusic)
- 2011 – Christine Hanson, David Formula - The organ of Corti (Off)

=== Other contributions ===
- 2015 – Borsalino City - film by Enrica Viola - composer
- 2010 – Non sono io - album by Tiziana Ghiglioni (Philology) - trumpet player, producer (tracks "Non sono io", "Ragazzo mio")
