= Michael Righeira =

Italian singer, songwriter, musician and actor (born 1961)

- Born: Stefano Rota; 1 October 1961 (age 64); Turin, Piedmont, Italy
- Other name: Italo Monitor
- Occupations: Singer; songwriter; musician; actor
- Spouse: Loredana Cazzola (m. 1990)
- Musical career
- Genres: Italo disco; synth-pop; new wave; electronic; Italo house
- Instruments: Vocals; keyboards; harmonica
- Labels: A&M; CGD; EMI; RCA; SAIFAM; Teldec
- Formerly of: Righeira

Stefano Rota (born 1 October 1961), known professionally as Michael Righeira, is an Italian singer, songwriter, musician and actor. He is best known for his work in the musical duo Righeira.

== Early life ==
Michael Righeira was born Stefano Rota on 1 October 1961 in Turin.

Rota attended Albert Einstein Scientific High School in Turin, where he first met schoolmate Stefano Righi.

== Career ==
At the age of 22 in 1983, Rota formed a musical duo together with Righi. They adopted the name Righeira, which was made up by Righi during a football game a few years earlier. The two billed themselves as Michael and Johnson Righeira, as well as "musical brothers". Their music resulted in attention from the La Bionda brothers, who became key figures in their subsequent success. They signed a recording contract in 1982. The duo had their first hit, "Vamos a la playa", in 1983. The success established their reputation as a modern dance duo. (Note: In 1983, Righeira released their debut studio album: Righeira.)

After Righeira disbanded for the second time in 2016, Rota moved to Thiene to pursue other career paths.

Following the first break-up of Righeira in 1992, Rota took an eight-year break from his music career to study law and literature at the University of Padua.

=== Acting career ===
In 1984, Rota starred in the television show Sotto le stelle, where he made his acting debut. The following year, he and comedian Enrico Beruschi co-starred in a sketch for the variety show Drive In. Rota appeared on the La TV delle ragazze show in 1988 together with actress Maria Amelia Monti. Between February 2011 and June 2013, Rota studied at Michael E. Rodgers acting school in Milan.

== Personal life ==
=== Relationships ===
==== Loredana Cazzola ====
In 1990, Rota married Loredana Cazzola, a businesswoman from Schio. The couple first met in 1988.

==== Johnson Righeira ====
Though Rota had a close relationship with Righi, the two grew apart following their second break-up in 2016.

== Filmography ==
=== Television ===
Year	Title	Role	Notes
2013	Nord Sud Ovest Est - Tormentoni on the Road	Himself	Music programme, 1 episode

== Sources ==
- Roberts, David (2006). British Hit Singles & Albums. London: Guinness World Records Limited. ISBN 1-904994-10-5.
- Arena, James (2017). Europe's Stars of '80s Dance Pop: 32 International Music Legends Discuss Their Careers. McFarland & Company. ISBN 9781476630144.
