= Pomada =

Argentinian music group

Pomada (also known as Grupo Pomada) is a beat band from Argentina that began in 1971 with original members Norberto (Beto) Dorfman on keyboards, Juan Jose Gimello (aka: Juan Jose Barbieri) on vocals, Juan Linera on guitar, Oscar Carranza on drums, and Daniel Paredes.

The lineup changed around in 1974, when Juan Jose left the band and Pedro Carreras joined as vocalist and bass guitarist. Pedro was their lead singer until 2004, when he went solo and Juan Manuel Uzin became the new lead singer. Beto Dorfman is the sole owner of Pomada, and is their manager although he no longer performs with them.

Their most notable hits include "Te quiero (aunque ya eres mia)", "Hoy chiquita que te vuelvo a ver" and "Amanece y tu no estas", sung by Juan Jose; and "Mi promesa", "Ojos sin luz", "Porque yo quiero", "Vestida de novia" and "Paraiso" sung by Pedro.

Their original record label was RCA, which is now Sony-BMG, and has released a collection of their past hits, Pomada-20 secretos de amor.

== Discography ==
- Regálame una noche contigo
- Mi promesa (1976)
- Vestida de novia (1977)
- Bellisimo
- Amor de juventud
- Bailando sobre una estrella
- Tu voz
- Surcos de amor
- Siguen los sucesos
- 15 Grandes exitos vol.1 (1999)
- 15 Grandes exitos vol.2 (2000)
- 20 Secretos de amor (2006)
- Platino (2008)
