= Righeira (album) =

1983 studio album by Righeira

Studio album by Righeira
- Released: 28 September 1983
- Recorded: August – September 1983
- Studio: Weryton (Munich)
- Genres: Italo disco; synth-pop
- Length: 33:44
- Label: CGD
- Producer: La Bionda

Righeira chronology
Righeira (1983)	Righeira '83-'85 (1985)

Singles from Righeira
- 1. "Tanzen mit Righeira" Released: 1983; 2. "Vamos a la playa" Released: 1983; 3. "No tengo dinero" Released: 1983

Righeira is the debut studio album by the Italian Italo disco duo Righeira. Produced by La Bionda, it was released on the CGD label on 28 September 1983 in Italy, (Note: According to producer Carmelo La Bionda, the album was intended to be finished for Christmas, yet it was released on 28 September.) and through A&M Records in North America, following the success of the band's first two singles "Vamos a la playa" which reached number 53 on the UK Singles Chart, and "No tengo dinero", which reached number 10 on the Dutch Top 40 chart.

Aside from their already released singles, including the debut single "Tanzen mit Righeira", Righeira recorded the majority of Righeira during studio sessions in Munich, West Germany between August and September 1983. Of the album's 8 songs, six were written by Johnson Righeira.

== Recording and production ==
In August 1983, Righeira convened at Weryton Studios in Munich, with engineers Berthold Weindorf and Ben Fenner. By September 1983, eight songs had been recorded and mixed. Righeira were introduced to La Bionda in 1982 and they signed a contract which lasted to 1987. As Michelangelo and Carmelo La Bionda had moved their productions to Munich in the mid-1970s, and Righeira was signed to them, they decided they would record their debut album there. La Bionda gave Righeira a chance to experiment with their own sound. Many of the album's songs featured a futuristic and modern sound, including "Vamos a la playa" whose lyrics talks about the explosion of an atomic bomb.

== Packaging ==
Atipiqa designed and art-directed the album cover for Righeira.

The front of the LP includes a colourful picture featuring Righeira in costumes, standing square in an imaginary museum. The left side of the cover depicts a woman standing on a pedestal. Writing for Rolling Stone in 2018, Eric Pfeil jokingly compared the cover of the album to "Nik Kershaw's hairspray collection", referring to the 1980s style.

== Release ==
Righeira was released on the CGD label in Italy on 28 September 1983. Initially, the album was planned to be released just before Christmas. The album spawned the hit singles "Vamos a la playa" and "No tengo dinero" which helped Righeira with establishing a reputation as a modern dance duo. "Vamos a la playa" had already become a fan favourite as it was released several months before the debut album. The song managed to reach number 53 on the UK Singles Chart and ultimately made Stefano Righi and Stefano Rota famous in continental Europe. "No tengo dinero" achieved high popularity in the Netherlands and West Germany, peaking at number 10 and 12, respectively.

== Critical reception ==
In his 2018 review of the album, author Diego Olivas of Fond/Sound wrote:

On Righeira, gone were the themes of love, sex, or stuff of that nature ... Stefano Righi singing about nuclear annihilation, government surveillance, and crippling hypermodernism. "Vamos a la playa" gives the perfect example of what they tried to subterfuge through. Sung completely in Spanish and featuring lyrics about running from a beach to avoid a nuclear bomb’s blast, it was quite possibly one of the bleakest hits to ever soundtrack a summer. On tracks like "Jazz Musik", "Gli parlerò di te", and "Kon Tiki" you get the sense that all the crew involved really took umbrage to decadent Italy, there outré culture was selling, and they themselves didn’t feel privy to. From the album cover to the stilted music, which forced you to contort yourselves to a different kind of groove, everything on Righeira sounded "off" in the most unpretentious, yet surgically designed way they could. Using newfound Fairlight CMI samplers and the laconic motorik of post-disco Europe, Righeira cycled between vibrant structures full of multi-surface meanings and morose structures with vibrant meanings.

== Track listing ==
All tracks written by Righeira, except "Jazz Musik" by Hermann Weindorf.

Side one
No.	Title	Writer(s)	Lead vocals	Length
1.	"Tanzen mit Righeira"	Stefano Righi	Righi with Rota	5:31
2.	"Luciano Serra pilota"	Righi	Righi with Rota	3:27
3.	"Gli parlerò di te"	Righi	Righi	4:19
4.	"No tengo dinero"	Stefano Rota; Carmelo La Bionda	Righi with Rota	3:38
Total length:				16:55

Side two
No.	Title	Writer(s)	Lead vocals	Length
1.	"Disco volante"	Righi	Righi	4:50
2.	"Jazz Musik"	Hermann Weindorf	Righi	3:48
3.	"Kon Tiki"	Righi; Karen McMichael	Righi	4:32
4.	"Vamos a la playa"	Righi; C. La Bionda	Righi with Rota	3:39
Total length:				16:49

Notes

- Some cassette tape versions in Italy and Germany had "No tengo dinero" and "Vamos a la playa" swapped to be sequenced as the first track on both sides.

== Personnel ==
Credits adapted from the album's liner notes.

Righeira

- Johnson Righeira – lead, harmony and background vocals
- Michael Righeira – harmony and background vocals

Additional musicians

- Hermann Weindorf – piano, synthesizer on "Jazz Musik"
- Mats Björklund – guitar
- Günter Gebauer – bass guitar
- Curt Cress – drums
- Dhana Moray – background vocals on "Kon Tiki"

Production

- Carmelo La Bionda – producer
- Michelangelo La Bionda – producer
- Hermann Weindorf – producer
- Berthold Weindorf – engineer, mixing
- Ben Fenner – engineer, mixing

Artwork

- Atipiqa – design

== Bibliography ==
- Arena, James (2017). Europe's Stars of '80s Dance Pop: 32 International Music Legends Discuss Their Careers. McFarland & Company. ISBN 9781476630144.
- Roberts, David (2006). British Hit Singles & Albums. London: Guinness World Records Limited. p. 463. ISBN 1-904994-10-5.
