= Vamos a la playa (Righeira song) =

1983 single by Righeira

Single by Righeira

from the album Righeira
- Language: Spanish
- B-side: "Vamos a la playa" (Italian version); "Playa Dub"
- Released: 5 May 1983
- Genre: Italo disco
- Length: 3:39 (album version); 3:40 (single version)
- Label: CGD; A&M
- Songwriters: Johnson Righeira; Carmelo La Bionda
- Producer: La Bionda

Righeira singles chronology
"Tanzen mit Righeira" (1983)	"Vamos a la playa" (1983)	"No tengo dinero" (1983)

Music video
- "Vamos a la playa" on YouTube

"Vamos a la playa" is a song by the Italian Italo disco duo Righeira, released on 5 May 1983 through CGD Records in Italy and on 19 August 1983 in the UK through A&M Records as the second single from their debut studio album, Righeira (1983). It was written by Johnson Righeira, the duo's lead vocalist, and producer Carmelo La Bionda. The single went to number one in Italy, as well as in Argentina and Uruguay and on the Swiss Hitparade. It became a top ten single in several European countries, reaching number two on both the Belgian Ultratop chart and the Dutch Top 40 and on the Official German Charts it peaked at number three. The song was the duo's only charting hit in the UK, peaking at number 53 on the UK Singles Chart.

Despite its ostensibly innocuous beach theme, the song actually talks about the explosion of an atomic bomb.

== Background and inspiration ==
Johnson Righeira came up with the melody for "Vamos a la playa" as he experimented on a keyboard.

In 2017, Righi told Vice journalist Demented Burrocacao how he got the idea for his song:

Towards the end of 1981, we entered a cellar with these friends who had their studio, their rehearsal room, in preparation for a New Year's Eve performance we had to do at the Casablanca in Florence. I already had a rough draft of "Vamos a la playa", which developed from my first works that were influenced by the 1960s. I wanted to make a beach song that was post-atomic and that made extensive use of electronics. And there in that cellar, putting my hands haphazardly on a keyboard, it suddenly came to me – the chorus of "Vamos a la playa" started playing in my head ... I must say that it certainly was one of the most important moments of my life.

== Critical reception ==
Writing for Le journal minimal in 2022, journalist Emmanuelle Veil described the lyrics to "Vamos a la playa" as "acidic". In Fond/Sound's appraisal of Righeira, writer Diego Olivas described "Vamos a la playa" as "one of the bleakest hits to ever soundtrack a summer". In his song review for L'Humanité, Benjamin König described it as a "committed" recording. He added that "it doesn't just talk about sunbathing, but about the end of the nuclear world". Gunter van Assche of De Morgen said that "Vamos a la playa" is "one of the most cynical summer tunes ever". He also comments that "it is a miracle that this melancholy vision of fear became a worldwide hit".

== Commercial performance ==
"Vamos a la playa" was released in the United Kingdom in 1983 and entered the UK Singles Chart at number 99, moving to its peak of number 53 the next month. In Belgium, "Vamos a la playa" debuted at number 40 on the Ultratop chart on 13 August 1983 and reached a peak of number two. In the Netherlands, "Vamos a la playa" debuted at number 15 on the Dutch Top 40 and reached a peak of two on 10 September 1983. The song reached a peak of number three in Germany, where it remained for one week, before spending a total of 18 weeks on the chart. On the Swiss Singles Chart, "Vamos a la playa" was one of the highest debuting songs on the issue dated 7 August 1983. After two weeks, the song reached the top of the chart for two weeks, becoming Righeira's first number-one single there. According to Italian newspaper La Repubblica, "Vamos a la playa" has sold over three million copies worldwide.

== Music video ==
=== Reception and analysis ===
Arne Siegmund of Watson reviewed the video in 2018, and commented that the video combined "synthesizers, colourful ties and men dancing funny."

Balázs Barbi of Nők Lapja pointed out the video for its "depressing" atmosphere through the apocalyptic vision that constituted it. The neon colours, reddened faces and the appearance of the two singers seemed to make "the video easier to interpret", she added.

== Live performances ==
On 1 May 2023, Johnson Righeira performed the song as part of the annual May Day concert at Piazza di San Giovanni in Laterano in Rome.

== Cover versions and usage in media ==
Yugoslav schlager music group Opatijski suveniri released a cover of "Vamos a la playa" in 1983 under the Jugoton label. It was composed in Serbo-Croatian but the original title was kept for the chorus. The song was re-released in 2018 under the 2 LP vinyl compilation "Socialist Disco: Dancing Behind Yugoslavia’s Velvet Curtain 1977-1987".

Pierre Littbarski performed "Vamos a la playa" in the fifth season of the German singing television series The Masked Singer. He was eliminated from the competition in week two.

An electronic music cover/parody of "Vamos a la playa" was used at the 2026 Winter Olympics, held in Milan and Cortina D'Ampezzo — mainly at the opening ceremony, featuring artists dressed as caricatures of opera composers Giuseppe Verdi, Gioachino Rossini, and Giacomo Puccini — reworked as a viral pop anthem for the games.

== Track listings ==
- Italian 7-inch single

A. "Vamos a la playa" (Spanish version) – 3:40
B. "Vamos a la playa" (Italian version) – 3:40

- Italian 12-inch single

A1. "Vamos a la playa" (Spanish version) – 5:09
A2. "Vamos a la playa" (Italian version) – 3:39
B. "Playa Dub" – 6:34

- German 7-inch single

A. "Vamos a la playa" – 3:40
B. "Playa Dub" – 3:35

- German 12-inch maxi-single

A. "Vamos a la playa" – 5:07
B. "Playa Dub" – 7:00

== Credits and personnel ==
- Johnson Righeira – songwriter, vocals
- Michael Righeira – vocals
- Carmelo La Bionda – songwriter, producer
- Michelangelo La Bionda – producer
- Hermann Weindorf – co-producer, arranger
- Berthold Weindorf – engineering, mixing
- Ben Fenner – engineering, mixing
- Atipiqa – cover art design

Credits and personnel adapted from the Righeira album and 7-inch single liner notes.

== Charts ==
=== Weekly charts ===
Weekly chart performance for "Vamos a la playa"
Chart (1983)	Peak position
Argentina (Prensario)	1
Austria (Ö3 Austria Top 40)	11
Belgium (Ultratop 50 Flanders)	2
Denmark (IFPI)	6
Finland (Suomen virallinen lista)	4
Italy (Musica e dischi)	1
Ireland (IRMA)	23
Netherlands (Dutch Top 40)	2
Netherlands (Single Top 100)	6
Norway (VG-lista)	6
Spain (AFYVE)	6
Switzerland (Schweizer Hitparade)	1
UK Singles (Official Charts)	53
Uruguay (AP)	1
West Germany (GfK)	3

=== Year-end charts ===
Year-end chart performance for "Vamos a la playa"
Chart (1983)	Position
Belgium (Ultratop 50 Flanders)	51
France (SNEP)	77
Netherlands (Dutch Top 40)	51
Switzerland (Schweizer Hitparade)	20
West Germany (Official German Charts)	29

== Certifications ==
Certifications and sales for "Vamos a la Playa"
Region	Certification	Certified units/sales
Italy (FIMI) sales since 2009	Gold	50,000^{‡}
^{*} Sales figures based on certification alone.^{^} Shipments figures based on certification alone.^{‡} Sales+streaming figures based on certification alone.

== TN'T Party Zone version ==
"Vamos a la playa '92"

Single by TN'T Party Zone
- Language: Spanish
- Released: 1992
- Genre: Europop; electronic
- Length: 3:40
- Label: Strictly Dance
- Songwriters: Johnson Righeira; Carmelo La Bionda
- Producers: Tillmann Uhrmacher; Nino Tielmann

TN'T Party Zone singles chronology
"No Tengo Dinero '92" (1992)	"Vamos a la playa '92" (1992)	"One Night in Bangkok" (1993)

The song was covered by German duo TN'T Party Zone in 1992 as "Vamos a la playa '92".

The single reached No. 29 on the German singles chart.

=== Track listings ===
- German CD maxi-single
1. "Vamos a la playa '92" (Radio Version) – 3:40
2. "Vamos a la playa '92" (Till N' Tiel Party Mix) – 6:04
3. "Vamos a la playa '92" (Who Cares Trance Mix) – 5:10
4. "Lost in Spain" (El Payo Guitarra Mix) – 4:18
- German 12-inch promotional single

A1. "Vamos a la playa" (Playa Goes Guitarra Mix) – 5:29
A2. "Vamos a la playa" (Vamos is a Rhythm Remix) – 5:40
B. "Get Into the Groove" (Tales of Dance Mix) – 6:04

- German 12-inch maxi-single

A. "Vamos a la playa '92" (Till N' Tiel Party Mix) – 6:04
B1. "Vamos a la playa '92" (Who Cares Trance Mix) – 5:10
B2. "Lost in Spain" (El Payo Guitarra Mix) – 4:18

=== Charts ===
==== Weekly charts ====
Chart (1992)	Peak position
Germany (GfK)	29

== 2001: Vamos a la playa ==
"2001: Vamos a la playa"

Single by Righeira
- Language: Italian
- Released: 2001
- Genre: House
- Length: 4:34
- Label: SAIFAM
- Songwriters: Johnson Righeira; Carmelo La Bionda
- Producers: Righeira; Mauro Farina

Righeira singles chronology
"Ferragosto" (1990)	"2001: Vamos a la playa" (2001)	"La musica electronica" (2007)

"2001: Vamos a la playa" is the re-packaged version of the original 1983 version of "Vamos a la playa", released as a single in 2001.

"2001: Vamos a la playa" was released in Italy and Germany in 2001.

=== Track listings ===
- Italian CD maxi-single
1. "Vamos a la playa" (Dance Movement Remix) – 4:34
2. "Vamos a la playa" (Factory Team Happy Remix) – 5:15
3. "Vamos a la playa" (Ottomix Version) – 5:36
4. "Vamos a la playa" (DJ Gius Remix) – 6:46
5. "Vamos a la playa" (Montefiori Cocktail Remix) – 4:19
6. "Vamos a la playa" (Los Amigos Invisibles - Cuyagua's Mix) – 7:18
7. "Vamos a la playa" (Le Hammond Inferno - Popskee Remix) – 6:51
- Italian 12-inch single

A1. "Vamos a la playa" (Dance Movement Remix) – 4:34
A2. "Vamos a la playa" (Ottomix Version) – 5:36
B1. "Vamos a la playa" (DJ Gius Remix) – 6:46
B2. "Vamos a la playa" (Le Hammond Inferno - Popskee Remix) – 6:51

- German 12-inch single

A1. "Vamos a la playa" (Le Hammond Inferno - Popskee Remix) – 6:51
A2. "Vamos a la playa" (Montefiori Cocktail Remix) – 4:19
B1. "Vamos a la playa" (Fluorescente Mix) – 5:13
B2. "Vamos a la playa" (Los Amigos Invisibles - Cuyagua's Mix) – 7:18

=== Credits and personnel ===
- Writer: Johnson Righeira, Carmelo La Bionda
- Production: Righeira
- Co-production: Mauro Farina
- Publication: La Bionda Music S.r.l.

== See also ==
- List of number-one hits of 1983 (Italy)
- List of number-one singles of the 1980s (Switzerland)
