= Righeira =

Italian Italo disco duo

- Michael Righeira (left) and Johnson Righeira (right), c. 1983

Background information
- Origin: Turin, Italy
- Genres: Italo disco; new wave
- Works: Righeira discography
- Years active: 1983–1992; 1999–2016
- Labels: CGD; RCA; SAIFAM
- Past members: Johnson Righeira; Michael Righeira

Righeira were an Italian Italo disco duo consisting of Johnson Righeira (Stefano Righi) and Michael Righeira (Stefano Rota). Their most popular singles include "Vamos a la playa", "No tengo dinero", "L'estate sta finendo" and "Innamoratissimo (Tu che fai battere forte il mio cuore)".

== History ==
=== Formation ===
In 1982, Righi and Rota met the brothers Carmelo and Michelangelo La Bionda, successful producers and songwriters from Milan.

=== 1983–1985: Mainstream breakthrough ===
Their self-titled debut album, Righeira, produced by La Bionda, was recorded over two months in 1983 and released in September on the CGD label.

Their international breakthrough came with the single "Vamos a la playa", released earlier that year off the debut album and performed in Spanish, which entered into the top ten of several countries in Europe and South America. "Vamos a la playa" became their first No. 1 in Italy, where it remained for 10 non-consecutive weeks. The single sold three million copies worldwide.

The follow-up single, "No tengo dinero", also from the debut album and sung in Spanish, achieved notable success in Europe, reaching the top 20 in the Netherlands, West Germany, Italy and Switzerland.

The release of the debut album, and their earliest singles, earned Righeira a reputation as a modern dance duo.

In May 1985, Righeira released the non-album single "L'estate sta finendo", which climbed to No. 1 in the Italian charts and won the Festivalbar event later that year.

=== 1986–1988: Continued success ===
In February 1986, Righeira participated in the Sanremo Music Festival 1986 with the song "Innamoratissimo (Tu che fai battere forte il mio cuore)", ultimately finishing fifteenth. The song nevertheless became a top ten hit in their home country, peaking at No. 9.

Righeira's second album, Bambini Forever, was released in June 1986.

In 1987, Righeira contributed to the soundtrack of the film Rimini Rimini, directed by Sergio Corbucci, providing the track "Rimini Splash Down" alongside La Bionda and singer Raffaella Riva of Gruppo Italiano.

Later that year, Righeira were invited as songwriters to mark the 30th anniversary of the Zecchino d'Oro children's music festival, presenting the song "Annibale" (English: "Hannibal").

=== 1988–1992: Decline and first split ===
The duo left CGD to join Flea Records, releasing their first single for the label, "Garageamos/Adalas Omaet", in 1989, attempting to widen their appeal. They supported the single with television appearances on state and private channels in Italy, as well as concerts in Europe, including dates in West Germany, the Benelux, Spain, France and Greece.

After the release of their third studio album Uno, Zero, Centomila in 1992, the duo disbanded for the first time that autumn.

=== 1992–1999: Solo projects and hiatus ===
Following their split, Rota formed a new project called Gloria Mundi. The group, a trio, featured Rota alongside Claudio Corradini and Francesco Signorini. Their collaboration yielded two albums: Movimenti celesti (1993) and Evviva (1994).

In late 1993, Righi faced significant legal problems when he was arrested on charges of drug possession and dealing.

=== 1999–2016: Reunion and second split ===
In 1999, the duo reunited and embarked on a tour.

Their fourth and final studio album, Mondovisione, was released in 2007.

Tanzen mit Righeira, a documentary directed by Alessandro Castelletto, was released in 2008.

In 2016, Righi and Rota disbanded again.

== Personnel ==
- Johnson Righeira – vocals
- Michael Righeira – vocals

== Discography ==
- Righeira (1983)
- Bambini Forever (1986)
- Uno, Zero, Centomila (1992)
- Mondovisione (2007)

== Filmography ==
- Tanzen mit Righeira (2008)
