= La Bionda =

Italian disco duo (1970–2022)

Background information
- Also known as: D. D. Sound (1977–1981)
- Origin: Italy
- Genres: Italo disco; disco; pop; dance
- Years active: 1970–2022
- Labels: Dischi; Baby; Ariola
- Past members: Carmelo La Bionda; Michelangelo La Bionda

La Bionda were an Italian disco duo consisting of siblings Carmelo (1949–2022) and Michelangelo La Bionda (born 1952). They are considered among the pioneers of the Italo disco music genre.

The siblings were born in Ramacca, Sicily and moved to Milan, Lombardy in 1954.

== History ==
=== Beginnings ===
Carmelo was born on 2 February 1949, and Michelangelo on 25 August 1952 in Ramacca, Sicily. Their family moved to Milan in 1954.

=== Music career ===
They debuted as songwriters with "Primo sole, primo fiore", a piece the pop band Ricchi e Poveri presented at the Song Festival in Venice in 1970. They also wrote "Neve bianca, Amica, Gentile se vuoi" for the Italian female singer Mia Martini, and "Piccolo uomo" with Bruno Lauzi (lyrics). Michelangelo La Bionda also did some session work. In 1975, he played acoustic guitar on the album Volume VIII by Fabrizio De André.

Between 1972 and 1977, La Bionda recorded two albums of acoustic ballads, Fratelli La Bionda s.r.l. (1972) and Tutto Va Bene (1977). "Tutto va bene" was recorded at the Apple Studios in London, and features Nicky Hopkins on piano.

La Bionda became popular when they turned to disco music. They moved to Munich, when they started recording under the pseudonym D. D. Sound (short for Disco Delivery Sound), a moniker that would accompany them for their entire recording career. Their first two disco singles, "Disco Bass" and "Burning Love", became international hits. They were followed by "Café" (1977) and "1, 2, 3, 4 Gimme Some More".

In 1978, they released their album La Bionda. It included "Sandstorm" (produced by Dieter Bohlen) and "There for Me", as well as the worldwide hit "One for You, One for Me". From 1978 to 1981, La Bionda continued to record more dance music, either under their name (as with the albums Bandido, High Energy and I Wanna Be Your Lover) or as D. D. Sound (as with the singles "Café", "The Hootchie Cootchie", and "Wake Up in the Night"). Following the 1980s, La Bionda focused on writing, producing and publishing music.

=== Songwriting and production ===
In the 1980s, La Bionda scored the soundtracks for many films directed by Sergio and Bruno Corbucci, including Super Fuzz (1980), Who Finds a Friend Finds a Treasure (1981), starring Bud Spencer and Terence Hill, My Darling, My Dearest (1981), Cat and Dog (1983), A tu per tu (1984), Miami Supercops (1985) and Roba da ricchi (1987), as well as Virtual Weapon (1997), directed by Antonio Margheriti. They also composed the theme from the television series Inspector Giusti with Enrico Montesano, and produced various commercial jingles, such as "Sorrisi is Magic for Smiles and Songs" (for the Italian magazine Sorrisi & Canzoni), "Heart of Cream" (for Walls' Cornetto), "I'm Coming Home" (for Bayer Aspirin) and Coca-Cola. In 2009, they re-recorded "1, 2, 3, 4 ... Gimme Some More" for a Vodafone commercial and "One For You, One For Me" for the digital television channel Mediaset Premium.

In parallel, in 1983, they began their collaboration with the dance duo Righeira, writing their early hits "Vamos a la playa" and "No Tengo Dinero". In 1984, Carmelo La Bionda recorded a single as a solo artist. "I Love You"/"You're So Fine" have been sampled by American Band Neon Indian.

=== Logic Studios ===
In 1985, La Bionda founded and started operating Logic Studios, a recording studio in Milan. Musicians who have recorded at Logic Studios over the years include Ray Charles, Robert Palmer, Paul Young, and Depeche Mode, as well as pop stars like Laura Pausini, Nek, Rihanna and Pooh.

=== Personal lives ===
Carmelo La Bionda died of cancer on 5 November 2022, at the age of 73.

== Discography ==
La Bionda

- Fratelli La Bionda s.r.l. (1972)
- Tutto Va Bene (1977)
- La Bionda (1978)
- Bandido (1979)
- High Energy (1979)
- I Wanna Be Your Lover (1980)
- In Beatween (1998)

D. D. Sound

- 1-2-3-4 Gimme Some More! (1977)
- Disco Delivery (1977)
- Café (1978)
- The Hootchie Cootchie (1979)
