= SAIFAM =

Italian record company

The SAIFAM Group
- Founded: 1981; 45 years ago
- Founder: Mauro Farina; Giuliano Crivellente
- Status: Active
- Genre: Various
- Country of origin: Italy
- Official website: www.saifam.com

The SAIFAM Group is an Italian record label and production company featuring hardstyle, Italo dance, Eurodance, Hi-NRG, pop and fitness music genres.

== History ==
The group was started by Mauro Farina and Giuliano Crivellente, a production duo who produced more than 1,000 tracks, selling over ten million albums worldwide. In 1981, they created the Factory Sound Studio and the SAIFAM Group. The pair have been recognized as founders of HI-NRG, the genre in which they achieved their first gold records, thanks largely to localized translations of their songs in the Asian market.

In the early 1990s, their hits included "What's Up" by DJ Miko, "Moments in Soul" by JT and the Big Family, and "Venus" by Don Pablo's Animals, which entered the European and American charts. Since the mid-1990s, thanks to the birth of the Arsenic Sound division of their company, other hits are being produced such as the Zombie Nation Remix which entered the official charts in Europe, America and Asia. Perhaps their greatest international success came in 1998 with the dance track "Free" by female duo Bacon Popper.

The 2000s saw releases "La Follia" by DJ Frederik, as well as Italian Hip Hop records from Club Dogo, Mondo Marcio, and Fabri Fibra on the Italian National Indies Sales Charts.

In 2007, the track "Cream" by Federico Franchi entered several international charts, selling over 100,000 units. In 2008–2009, the track "Krazy" by Pitbull (with SAIFAM as co-publishers and co-masters owner) entered the US charts, selling more than 500,000 units (physical and downloads) and Simone Farina with the band Desaparecidos produced the tracks "Ibiza" and "Fiesta Loca" which entered several international charts and each sold over 100,000 units.

In 2013, "Deep in Love" by Tom Boxer reached platinum sales status in Italy.
