= Compagnia Generale del Disco =

- Parent company: Warner Music Group
- Founded: 1948
- Founder: Teddy Reno
- Defunct: 2004
- Status: Sold to East West in 1989; absorbed into Atlantic
- Distributor: East West Records
- Genre: Various
- Country of origin: Italy

Compagnia Generale del Disco ("General Record Company"; CGD) was an Italian record label.

== History ==
CGD was founded in 1948 by singer Teddy Reno. At that time it was established in Milan in Via Passarella 4. As artistic director Reno called fellow musician Lelio Luttazzi, who replaced David Matalon as Head of International Production in 1956.

By collaborating with some publishers such as Suvini-Zerboni and Messaggerie Musicali, CGD was able to hire many artists who roused much success as Giorgio Consolini, Betty Curtis and Johnny Dorelli.

In 1959, Teddy Reno sold CGD to Ladislao Sugar, a publisher of Hungarian origins and future entrepreneurial owner of the Sugar Group, which was founded by Carlo Alberto Rossi's Casa Editrice Arison, and then abandoned to buy Musical Messengers (Messaggerie Musicali). It was on this occasion that he came into contact with Teddy Reno.

In 1961, CGD moved to Galleria del Corso, where many other record labels and music publishing were located. In 1968, Ladislas decided to focus on the publishing division Grove Press and was replaced by his son, Peter.

=== Merger with CBS Italia ===
In 1966, CGD made an agreement with CBS to distribute its catalog in Italy. In 1970, CGD eventually merged with CBS Italia and established CBS Sugar.

In 1973, it moved to Via Quintiliano 40. In 1977, when CBS decided to open its own premises in Italy, all the Italian artists who recorded for CBS were incorporated with CGD and their records were reissued by the new record label.

Some time later, Piero Sugar's wife, pop star Caterina Caselli decided to establish a satellite record company, Sugar Music, supporting non-mainstream acts like The Radio Dept, Franco Fanigliulo, Piccola Orchestra Avion Travel and Elisa Toffoli.

=== Later years ===
Throughout the 1980s, CGD continued its operations with nine subsidiary labels. A notable signee during this decade was the late American singer Nicolette Larson, who recorded only one album for the company, Shadows of Love.

In 1988, CGD, like many other record companies, ran out of business. East West Records and parent company Warner Music Group, bought the label and continued its operations. In 1995, it changed its name to CGD East West. In 2004, the label was eventually absorbed into Atlantic Records.
