= Del suo veloce volo =

Live album by Antony & Franco Battiato
- Released: 26 November 2013
- Recorded: 2 September 2013
- Venue: Verona Arena
- Label: Universal Music Group

Franco Battiato chronology
Apriti sesamo (2012)	Del suo veloce volo (2013)	Joe Patti's Experimental Group (2014)

Antony chronology
Cut the World (2012)	Del suo veloce volo (2013)	Hopelessness (2016)

Del suo veloce volo ('Of his swift flight') is a live album by British singer Anohni (here credited as Antony) and Italian singer-songwriter Franco Battiato, released in 2013.

== Overview ==
Following their collaboration in the 2008 Battiato's album Fleurs 2, Battiato and Anohni held two concerts in 2013, in Florence and in Verona.

The album was recorded during the concert the duo held on 2 September at the Verona Arena. The two artists alternated, duetting on the title track (an Italian-language cover of Antony and the Johnsons' "Frankenstein") and on Rolling Stones' "As Tears Go By". Battiato was accompanied by the Arturo Toscanini Philharmonic, conducted by Carlo Guaitoli, while Antony performed with Rob Moose and Thomas Bartlett. Alice appeared as a guest on two of Battiato's songs, their 1984 Eurovision entry "I treni di Tozeur" and "La realtà non esiste", a cover of a song by their recently deceased mutual friend Claudio Rocchi.

Cover art was realized by Francesco Messina and photographer Alessio Pizzicannella.

The album was released by Universal Music Group on 26 November 2013.

== Track listing ==
Del suo veloce volo track listing
No.	Title	Writer(s)	Length
1.	"Cripple and the Starfish"	Anohni Hegarty	5:44
2.	"For Today I Am a Boy"	Hegarty	4:07
3.	"You Are My Sister"	Hegarty	4:31
4.	"Il re del mondo"	Franco Battiato, Giusto Pio	3:27
5.	"Tutto l'universo obbedisce all'amore"	Battiato, Manlio Sgalambro	3:23
6.	"As Tears Go By"	Mick Jagger, Keith Richards, Andrew Loog Oldham	3:02
7.	"Crazy in Love"	Rich Harrison, Beyoncé Knowles, Eugene Record, Jay-Z	5:18
8.	"Salt Silver Oxygen"	Hegarty	3:39
9.	"Del suo veloce volo"	Hegarty	4:03
10.	"Hope There's Someone"	Hegarty	4:50
11.	"La realtà non esiste"	Claudio Rocchi	3:03
12.	"I treni di Tozeur"	Battiato, Pio	2:54
13.	"La cura"	Battiato, Sgalambro	4:02
14.	"E ti vengo a cercare"	Battiato	3:54
15.	"Bandiera bianca / Up Patriots to Arms"	Battiato, Pio	5:02
16.	"Inneres Auge"	Battiato, Sgalambro	4:01

== Charts ==
Chart performance for Del suo veloce volo
Chart (2013–14)	Peak position
Italian Albums (FIMI)	7
Spanish Albums (PROMUSICAE)	61
