= Gianni Mocchetti =

- Born: Gianfranco Mocchetti; 12 May 1947; Legnano, Italy
- Died: 28 January 2013 (aged 65) Como, Italy
- Genres: Beat, experimental, progressive rock, pop rock
- Occupations: Singer-songwriter, guitarist, bassist
- Instruments: Guitar, bass guitar
- Years active: 1965–2013
- Labels: Ricordi, CGD, Metronome, Lira, Giungla, BMG Ricordi, Spintapes

Gianfranco "Gianni" Mocchetti (31 May 1947 – 28 January 2013) was an Italian singer-songwriter, guitarist and bassist.

== Career ==
Mocchetti began playing the guitar with beat groups and formed the group Cristalli fragili, with Gianfranco D'Adda on drums and percussion and Richard Pirolli on vocals (the latter of whom would later have a solo career under the name Genco Pure & Co.) In the same period he began working as a session musician in the recording studio, playing on records by various artists.

In 1971 Cristalli fragili were discovered by Franco Battiato, and with the addition of other musicians, including keyboardist Roberto Cacciapaglia, the group became the Battiatio's support group in the studio and in live performances. Mocchetti also played on the albums of other artists on the Italian "Bla Bla" record label.

When Battiato moved stylistically to a more experimental type of music, Mocchetti decided to start a solo career, and signed a recording contract with the Ricordi record label. In 1978 he participated in the Festivalbar Festival with the song Cantilena, and also performed the song at the Cantagiro in the same year. The following year he participated in the 29th edition of the Sanremo Music Festival with "Talismano nero".

In 1980 Mocchetti returned to the Cantagiro Festival with the song "Un amore in garage". He then adopted the name Methuselah, issuing in 1992 the album Terra di nessuno, and in 1996 formed with Luca Bonaffini the group Cronache, releasing the album Minora.

Affected by a serious family tragedy, Mocchetti was forced to take a break from his musical activities for a few years, but resumed in the new decade by signing with the Spintapes label and recording the 2004 album Beta, in which he reinterpreted every song (apart from "Revolution in the Air") in which he had participated on Battiato's records.

He has often performed with singer Silvia Perlini.

== Discography ==
=== Albums ===
- 1978, Paisa (Ricordi Records)
- 1979, Andara (Ricordi Records, SMRL 6245)
- 1992, Terra di nessuno (Lira Records, LRLP 036; issued under the name Methuselah)

=== Singles ===
- 1978, Paisa/Il balcone di Marta (Ricordi Records, SRL 10862)
- 1979, Talismano nero/Biancho (Ricordi Records, SRL 10890)
- 1980, Cane da città/Un amore in garage (Ricordi Records, SRL 10916)
- 1981, Fatti i fatti tuoi/Gioco mentale (Ricordi Records, SRL 10934)

=== Albums (issued abroad) ===
- 1978, Paisa (Metronome Records, 65012, released in Germany)

=== CDs ===
- 1992, Terra di nessuno( Lira Records, G CD 042; issued under the name Methuselah)
- 1996, Minora (Giungla Records/BMG Ricordi, published together with Luca Bonaffini under the name Cronache)
- 2004, Beta (Spintapes, SCD 001)

=== Album anthologies ===
- 1978, Festivalbar 1978 (CGD)
- 1979. Sanremo '79 (EMI)

=== On other artists' records ===
- 1972, Fetus by Franco Battiato
- 1972, Energia/Uni cellula by Franco Battiato (single)
- 1972, La convenzione/Paranoia by Franco Battiato (single)
- 1972, Pollution by Franco Battiato
- 1973, Sulla corde di Aries by Franco Battiato
- 1974, La finestra dentro by Juri Camisasca
- 1974, Clic, by Franco Battiato
- 1974, Clic (English version of Clic by Franco Battiato)
- 1975, La musica muore/Metamorfosi by Juri Camisasca (single)
- 1975, Himalaya /Un fiume di luce by Juri Camisasca (single)
- 1999, Foetus by Franco Battiato (English version, recorded in 1971 but unissued in Italy until 1999)

== Sources ==
=== Other sources ===
- (various authors), Gino Castaldo, Dizionario della Canzone Italiana, Armando Curcio (ed), 1990; listed as Gianni Mocchetti, p. 1105.
- Eddy Anselmi, Festival di Sanremo: Almanacco illustrato della canzone italiana, Panini, Modena; listed as Gianni Mocchetti, p. 799.
