= Mancinelli =

Mancinelli is an Italian surname. Notable people with the surname include:

- Antonio Mancinelli (1452–1505), Italian humanist, grammarian and rhetorician
- Daniel Mancinelli (born 1988), Italian racing driver
- Dusty Mancinelli, Canadian film director
- Giuseppe Mancinelli (painter) (1813–1875), Italian painter
- Graziano Mancinelli (1937–1992), Italian show jumping rider
- Gustavo Mancinelli (1842–1906), Italian painter
- Joseph Mancinelli (born 1957), Canadian trade unionist
- Laura Mancinelli (1933-2016), Italian writer and medievalist
- Luigi Mancinelli (1848–1921), Italian classical composer and conductor
- Marco Mancinelli (born 1982), Italian footballer
- Raniero Mancinelli, Italian tailor
- Roberto Mancinelli (disambiguation)
- Stefano Mancinelli (born 1983), Italian basketball player
