= Fleurs 3 =

Studio album by Franco Battiato
- Released: 20 August 2002
- Length: 39:32
- Label: Sony Music
- Producer: Francesco Cattini

Franco Battiato chronology
Ferro battuto (2001)	Fleurs 3 (2002)	Dieci stratagemmi (2004)

Fleurs 3, graphically rendered as Flεurs³, is a studio album by Italian singer-songwriter Franco Battiato, released by Sony Music in 2002. It is the second chapter in the Fleurs trilogy of cover albums, between Fleurs and Fleurs 2.

== Production ==
As with the previous chapters, the album consists of cover versions of songs, mostly from the 1960s and early 1970s. It also include a new song, "Come un sigillo", a duet with Alice. Starting from January 2002, Battiato anticipated in his concerts several songs of the album.

The album was recorded at Industria Musica studios in Milan. All the tracks were arranged by Battiato. Cover art was cured by Francesco Messina. The album was dedicated to the Sony Music general manager Fabrizio Intra, who had died a few months before at 49 years old. Several songs were used by Battiato for the soundtrack of his 2003 directorial debut film, Lost Love.

Battiato explained his choice of naming his second album in the Fleurs series as Fleurs 3 and not Fleurs 2 as "If you go from one to three the trilogy is closed; if you go along with the consequentiality of numbers, on the other hand, you open an infinite series."

== Release and reception ==
The album was released on 20 August 2002. It was officially presented on 5 September 2002 with a concert held at Rai Rome studios that was broadcast live on Rai Radio 1.

The album was a commercial success, topping the Italian album hit parade.

== Track listing ==
No.	Title	Writer(s)	Length
1.	"Perduto amor"	Salvatore Adamo, Angelo De Lorenzo	3:17
2.	"Impressioni di settembre"	Mauro Pagani, Franco Mussida, Mogol	3:40
3.	"Se mai"	Charlie Chaplin, Geoffrey Parsons, John Turner, Giorgio Calabrese, Giuseppe Gramitto Ricci	3:06
4.	"Ritornerai"	Bruno Lauzi	3:25
5.	"Col tempo sai"	Léo Ferré, Enrico Medail, Gian Piero Simontacchi	3:34
6.	"Insieme a te non ci sto più"	Paolo Conte, Vito Pallavicini	3:12
7.	"Il cielo in una stanza"	Gino Paoli	3:11
8.	"Le tue radici"	Alan Sorrenti	3:20
9.	"Se tu sapessi"	Bruno Lauzi	3:17
10.	"Sigillata con un bacio"	Gary Geld, Peter Udell, Ettore Carrera, Saro Leva	11:17
11.	"Come un sigillo" (with Alice)	Franco Battiato, Manlio Sgalambro	3:03
12.	"Beim Schlafengehen"	Richard Strauss, Hermann Hesse	2:56

== Charts ==
Chart performance for Fleurs 3
Chart (2002)	Position
Italy (FIMI)	1

=== Year-end charts ===
Year-end chart performance for Fleurs 3
Chart (2002)	Position
Italian Albums (FIMI)	18

== Certifications ==
Region	Certification	Certified units/sales
Italy (FIMI) Sales since 2009	Gold	25,000^{‡}
^{‡} Sales+streaming figures based on certification alone.
