= Sabah Benziadi =

Algerian-Italian artistic director, dancer, choreographer, and filmmaker

- صباح بن زيادي
- Born: March 9, 1964 (age 62); Algiers, Algeria
- Citizenship: Algerian, Italian
- Occupations: Artistic director, dancer, choreographer, filmmaker
- Years active: 1974–present
- Known for: Oriental and experimental dance pedagogy, cultural promotion, *Hawala* (2024), artistic direction of MigrArti Film Fest
- Website: sabahbenziadi.com

Sabah Benziadi (صباح بن زيادي; born March 9, 1964) is an Algerian-Italian artistic director, dancer, choreographer, and filmmaker.

Throughout her career, she has performed at numerous cultural festivals, staged theatrical dance productions, and appeared on various television programs. She is widely known for her creative collaborations as a dancer and choreographer for the prominent Italian singer-songwriter Franco Battiato and Algerian Raï musician Cheb Khaled.

Benziadi serves as the national coordinator of oriental dance for the Italian National Academy of Sports Dance Teachers (ANIDS) and is an international competition judge for the Italian Dance Sport Federation (FIDS/CONI). She is also the founder and principal instructor of the Academy of Oriental Dance in Palermo, Sicily.

== Early life and background ==
Benziadi discovered her passion for dance at the age of ten, inheriting her artistic lineage from her grandmother, who practiced traditional *Ouled Naïl* dance. She made her earliest public performances on stage at the Théâtre National Algérien in Algiers. At the age of 24, she began traveling across Europe before permanently relocating to Italy, settling in Palermo, Sicily.

== Career ==
=== Dance and Choreography ===
Benziadi established her artistic career as an oriental dancer, transitioning into a choreographer and master instructor of traditional Arabic, Berber, and experimental dance forms. Her experimental styles draw structural inspiration from ecological movements and natural phenomena, such as waves and air currents. Because of her performance style, critics have compared her artistry to that of the classic Egyptian dancer Samia Gamal.

In Palermo, she founded the dance troupe "El Kahina," named after the 7th-century Berber warrior queen Kahina. Her staged productions frequently integrate sociopolitical themes such as environmental conservation, desertification, immigration, and global peace. Notably, her 2010 production La palma clandestina (The Clandestine Palm Tree), presented at the Segesta Festival, used dance to address the red palm weevil infestation affecting Sicily's landscape as a metaphor for social integration.

In 2001, Italian singer-songwriter Franco Battiato witnessed Benziadi performing on the island of Pantelleria. Impressed by her choreography, Battiato invited her to join his promotional tour for the album Ferro battuto, which traveled across Italy and Spain. Their collaborative relationship continued over two decades; she later featured as a prominent dancer in the official music video for Battiato's posthumously released 2019 single, "Torneremo ancora".

Benziadi has produced and choreographed numerous large-scale thematic performances across major historic venues in Europe and North Africa, including:

- Mille e un velo (Taormina Ancient Theatre, 2004)
- Veli di Algeri (Pordenone, 2004)
- Le mille e una notte (Staged for the opening of the Zisa Castle Gardens in Palermo, 2005)
- Mille e sette veli (Palazzo dei Normanni, 2006), utilizing traditional sword, sand, and fire dances to celebrate the historic multiculturalism of the court of Emperor Frederick II.
- Jazzirat El Ahlam / L'isola sognata (Taormina Arte, 2011; later performed in Bisceglie, 2014), which explored Sicily's Arab roots through the verses of the 11th-century Sicilian-Arab poet Ibn Hamdis. This production was created in partnership with the international theater festivals of Casablanca and Marrakesh.

=== Artistic Direction and Cinema ===
In 2017, Benziadi wrote, choreographed, and directed the experimental theater-dance piece Il viaggio di Ibn Battuta (in Italia). Staged at the Spasimo in Palermo, the project was backed by the MigrArti initiative of the Italian Ministry of Cultural Heritage and Activities (MIBACT) and incorporated the children of local immigrants into the cast.

Following this project, Benziadi was appointed the artistic director of the MigrArti Film Fest in Caltabellotta, Sicily, an international film festival centered on the themes of human migration, identity, and integration.

Her contributions to cinema include:

- Acting in the 2008 social-drama feature film La terramadre, directed by Nello La Marca.
- Serving as the curator and director of the "Arabic World Cinema" and "Films in Original Language" departments at the Sciacca Film Fest from 2010 to 2016.
- Serving as an international jury member for the International Confederation of Arthouse Cinemas (CICAE) at the 71st Venice International Film Festival (Orizzonti section) in 2014.
- Co-directing, producing, and working as cinematographer alongside Enis Mulè on the 2024 documentary film Hawala. The film details the financial abuses and systemic violence experienced by African migrants journeying toward Italy. The documentary screened at the Sciacca Film Fest, the Al Fujairah Mountains Cultural Festival, and the Abu Dhabi International Book Fair before entering competition for the David di Donatello awards in 2025.

== Social and Civic Activities ==
Benziadi serves as the president of the SABAH Cultural Association and the International Association of Oriental Dance, which promote intercultural dialogue through the performing arts. In 2012, she acted as a representative for immigrant association platforms during national citizenship and inclusion debates hosted at the Palazzo dei Normanni. In 2021, she joined WWF Sicily Mediterranean Area as a public ambassador to support environmental conservation campaigns protecting loggerhead sea turtles and coastal sand dunes in Sciacca.

== Television Appearances ==
In addition to broadcast stage performances alongside Franco Battiato on Rai 1 (such as Massimo Ranieri's show Siamo tutti invitati), Benziadi appeared on mainstream television in 2020. Alongside her sister Khadra and her cousins Zahia and Fella, she participated as a contestant on the culinary competition series Family Food Fight on Sky Uno and TV8, showcasing traditional Algerian cuisine.

== Awards and Recognition ==
- Merit Award from the Babylon International Festival (Iraq) – Awarded for her original choreography Med my love.
- Cultural Ambassador Award (2018) – Honored at the Fujairah Cultural Days event in Rome during the "Year of Zayed" celebrations, recognizing her role as a cultural emissary between the United Arab Emirates, the wider Arab world, and Italy.

== Bibliography ==
- Gaeta, Rita. *Nur, Dea e Dive Legate alla Danza Araba - Passioni nella storia, nel cinema, nei dipinti*. Rome: Terre Sommerse, 2012. ISBN 9788896786543.
