= Giubbe rosse (album) =

Live album by Franco Battiato
- Released: 1 November 1989
- Label: EMI

Franco Battiato chronology
Fisiognomica (1988)	Giubbe rosse (1989)	Come un cammello in una grondaia (1991)

Giubbe rosse ('Red Coats'), released in its Spanish version as Casaca Roja, is a 1989 live album by Italian singer-songwriter Franco Battiato.

== Overview ==
Recorded during the European tour that followed the release of Fisiognomica, the album includes performances from concerts held in Italy, France, and Spain. The first live album of Battiato, it consists of 12 of hits, along with the title track, an autobiographical newly recorded studio song that Battiato described as 'a sort of tribute to Sicily', and three compositions he had previously written for other artists: "Alexander Platz" (Milva), "Lettera al Governatore della Libia" (Giuni Russo), and "Mesopotamia", originally recorded as "Cosa resterà di me" by Gianni Morandi. The Spanish version of the album include five songs in Spanish language, with lyrics adapted by Grazia Sanna.

The cover art, designed by Battiato, features an anonymous 19th-century French painting. Originally, Battiato's name did not appear on the cover, so EMI eventually added a sticker to the album's cellophane wrapping reading "It contains the hits of Franco Battiato".

== Track listing ==
Giubbe rosse track listing
No.	Title	Writer(s)	Length
1.	"Giubbe rosse"	Franco Battiato	4:15
2.	"Alexander Platz"	Alfredo Cohen, Battiato, Giusto Pio	3:24
3.	"Lettera al governatore della Libia" (feat. Giuni Russo)	Battiato, Pio	3:27
4.	"Mesopotamia"	Battiato	4:24
5.	"L'era del cinghiale bianco"	Battiato, Pio	3:38
6.	"Un'altra vita"	Battiato, Pio	3:01
7.	"Voglio vederti danzare"	Battiato, Pio	3:25
8.	"L'oceano di silenzio"	Battiato, Fleur Jaeggy	4:26
9.	"Sequenze e frequenze"	Battiato	7:06
10.	"Aria di rivoluzione"	Battiato	3:35
11.	"No U Turn"	Battiato	4:25
12.	"Summer on a Solitary Beach"	Battiato, Pio	3:31
13.	"Cuccurucucù"	Battiato, Pio	2:59
14.	"Centro di gravità permanente"	Battiato, Pio	3:54
15.	"Gli uccelli"	Battiato, Pio	4:44
16.	"E ti vengo a cercare"	Battiato, Pio	3:58

== Charts ==
Chart performance for Giubbe rosse
Chart (1989–90)	Peak position
Italy (Musica e dischi)	11
