= Manlio Sgalambro =

Italian philosopher, writer and poet (1924-2014)

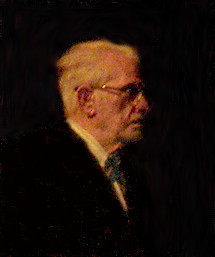
- Sgalambro in 2007
- Born: 9 December 1924; Lentini, Syracuse, Italy
- Died: 6 March 2014 (aged 89); Catania, Sicily, Italy
- Education: University of Catania
- Occupations: Philosopher; writer; poet
- Children: 5
- Website: manliosgalambro.it

Manlio Sgalambro (Italian: [ˈmanljo zɡaˈlambro]; 9 December 1924 – 6 March 2014) was an Italian philosopher, writer, and poet born in Lentini.

== Early life and education ==
Beginning in 1945, Sgalambro wrote for Prisma, a review directed by Leonardo Grassi. His first philosophical work was Paralipomeni all'irrazionalismo. In 1947, he began studying law at the University of Catania. From 1959 to 1966, he published essays in the periodical of literature Incidenza, starting with Crepuscolo e notte (reprinted in 2011). During this time, he also wrote for the journal Tempo Presente, edited by Nicola Chiaromonte and Ignazio Silone.

== Career ==
=== Publication with Adelphi ===
In the late 1970s, Sgalambro began developing a more structured body of philosophical writing. At the age of 55, he sent his first book La Morte Del Dole to the editor Adelphi. Adelphi went on to publish several of his works, including Treatise on Impiety, Anatol, On Short Thinking, Theological Dialogue, On Indifference in Matters of society, Consolation, Treatise on Age, De Mundo Pessimo, and Knowledge of the Worst and Of Crime.

During the early 1990s, Sgalambro worked with Fortunata De Martinis to establish a small publishing house based in Catania under De Martinis' own name. Sgalambro's role included managing pamphlets, publishing a pair of works (Dialogo sul comunismo and Contro la musica), and printing some operas by Giulio Cesare Vanini and Julien Benda.

=== Collaboration with Battiato ===
In 1993, during the presentation of a friend's poetry book, he met the musician Franco Battiato. Soon afterwards, Battiato proposed the libretto for the opus Il cavaliere dell'intelletto, about Frederik II of Hohenstaufen.

In 1998, he wrote song lyrics for Patty Pravo (Emma), Fiorella Mannoia (Il movimento del dare), Carmen Consoli (Marie ti amiamo) and Milva (Non conosco nessun Patrizio). In 2000, he published the single La mer, containing the cover of the song by Charles Trenet. In 2001, he published the album Fun Club, produced by Franco Battiato and Saro Cosentino, containing songs including La vie en rose (by Édith Piaf), Moon River (by Henry Mancini) and Me Gustas Tú (by Manu Chao). In 2007, he performed the role of the DC-9 airliner in Pippo Pollina’s opera Ultimo volo ("Last flight"), which addressed the 1980 Ustica massacre. In 2009, he published the single La canzone della galassia, containing a cover of Galaxy Song (taken from Monty Python's The Meaning of Life), sung with the Sardinian-English group Mab.

== Personal life ==
Sgalambro married in 1963, at the age of 39. He had five children: Elena, Simona, Riccardo, Irene, and Elisa. Faced with declining income from family-owned citrus orchards, he pursued a degree and later worked as a teacher.

== Bibliography ==
- La morte del sole (Adelphi, 1982).
- Trattato dell'empietà (Adelphi, 1987, ISBN 978-88-459-0253-6).
- Vom Tod der Sonne (German edition of La morte del sole, Hanser, 1988, ISBN 978-3-446-13955-8).
- Del metodo ipocondriaco (Il Girasole, 1989).
- La morte del sole (second edition, Adelphi, 1996, ISBN 978-88-459-1203-0).
- Trattato dell'empietà (second edition, Adelphi, 2005, ISBN 978-88-459-1977-0).
- Anatol (Adelphi, 1990, ISBN 978-88-459-0737-1).
- Anatol (French edition of Anatol, Circé, 1991, ISBN 978-2-908024-22-7).
- Del pensare breve (Adelphi, 1991, ISBN 978-88-459-0820-0).
- Dialogo teologico (Adelphi, 1993, ISBN 978-88-459-0961-0).
- Contro la musica: sull'ethos della musica (De Martinis, 1994, ISBN 978-88-8014-007-8).
- Dell'indifferenza in materia di società (Adelphi, 1994, ISBN 978-88-459-1080-7).
- De la pensée brève (French edition of Del pensare breve, Circé, 1995, ISBN 978-2-908024-82-1).
- Dialogo sul comunismo (De Martinis, 1995, ISBN 978-88-8014-019-1).
- La consolazione (Adelphi, 1995, ISBN 978-88-459-1150-7).
- Teoria della canzone (Bompiani, 1997, ISBN 978-88-452-3019-6).
- Nietzsche: frammenti di una biografia per versi e voce (Bompiani, 1998, ISBN 978-88-452-3599-3).
- Sphère de la mémoire & Éléments de théologie: dialogues philosophiques (French edition of Dialogo teologico, Circé, 1998, ISBN 978-2-908024-46-3).
- Poesie (limited edition, La Pietra Infinita, 1999).
- Trattato dell'età: una lezione di metafisica (Adelphi, 1999, ISBN 978-88-459-1490-4).
- Traité de l'âge: une leçon de métaphysique (French edition of Trattato dell'età, Payot, 2001, ISBN 978-2-228-89390-9).
- Opus postumissimum: frammento di un poema (Giubbe Rosse, 2002).
- De mundo pessimo (Adelphi, 2004, ISBN 978-88-459-1880-3).
- Quaternario: racconto parigino (Il Girasole, 2006).
- Nietzsche: frammenti di una biografia per versi e voce (second edition, Bompiani, 2006, ISBN 978-88-452-5656-1).
- La conoscenza del peggio (Adelphi, 2007, ISBN 978-88-459-2148-3).
- Del delitto (Adelphi, 2009, ISBN 978-88-459-2412-5).
- La consolación (Spanish edition of La consolazione, Pre-Textos, 2009, ISBN 978-84-8191-924-0).
- L'impiegato di filosofia (limited edition, La Pietra Infinita, 2010).
- Crepuscolo e notte (Mesogea, 2011, ISBN 978-88-469-2083-6).
- Nell'anno della pecora di ferro (Il Girasole, 2011, ISBN 978-88-97466-01-7).
- Marcisce anche il pensiero: frammenti di un poema (Bompiani, 2011, ISBN 978-88-452-6800-7).

== Discography ==
=== Album ===
- Fun club (Sony music entertainment Italy, 2001 – EAN 5099750496824).

=== Singoli ===
- La mer (Sony music entertainment Italy, 2000).
- Me gustas tú (Sony music entertainment Italy, 2001).
- La canzone della galassia (Sony music entertainment Italy, 2009).

== Videography ==
=== Videoclips ===
- Tre poesie (2004).
- La canzone della galassia (2009).

== Collaborations ==
=== Literature ===
- Arthur Schopenhauer, La filosofia delle università (Adelphi, 1992 – ISBN 978-88-459-0943-6).
- Giulio Cesare Vanini, Confutazione delle religioni (De Martinis, 1993).
- Julien Benda, Discorso coerente sui rapporti tra Dio e il mondo (De Martinis, 1994).
- Giuseppe Tornatore, Una pura formalità (De Martinis, 1994).
- Maurizio Cosentino, I sistemi morali (Boemi, 1998).
- Ottavio Cappellani, La morale del cavallo: trattato dei cavalieri (Nadir, 1998).
- Tommaso Ottonieri, Elegia sanremese (Bompiani, 1998).
- Domenico Trischitta, Daniela Rocca: il miraggio in celluloide (Boemi, 1999).
- Salvo Basso, Dui (Prova d'autore, 1999).
- Manlio Sgalambro & Davide Benati, Segrete (La pietra infinita, 2001).
- Mariacatena De Leo & Luigi Ingaliso, Nell'antro del filosofo: dialogo con Manlio Sgalambro (Prova d'autore, 2002 – ISBN 978-88-86140-99-7).
- Manlio Sgalambro, Silvia Batisti & Rossella Lisi, Opus postumissimum: frammento di un poema (Giubbe rosse, 2002).
- Manlio Sgalambro & Antonio Contiero, Dolore e poesia (La pietra infinita, 2003).
- Vincenzo Mollica, Franco Battiato: l'alba dentro l'imbrunire (Einaudi, 2004).
- Riccardo Mondo & Luigi Turinese, Caro Hillman: venticinque scambi epistolari con James Hillman (Bollati Boringhieri, 2004 – ISBN 978-88-339-1436-7).
- Antonio Contiero, Galleria Buenos Aires (Aliberti, 2006 – ISBN 978-88-7424-151-4).
- Luca Farruggio, Bugie estatiche (Il filo, 2006 – ISBN 978-88-7842-425-8).
- Bruno Monsaingeon, Incontro con Nadia Boulanger (Rue Ballu, 2007 – ISBN 978-88-95689-04-3).
- Cristina Valenti, Ustica e le sue arti: percorsi tra impegno creatività e memoria (Titivillus, 2007 – ISBN 978-88-7218-186-7).
- Franco Battiato, In fondo sono contento di aver fatto la mia conoscenza (Bompiani & L'ottava, 2007).
- Anna Vasta, I malnati (I quaderni del battello ebbro, 2007 – ISBN 978-88-86861-59-5).
- Michele Falzone, Franco Battiato: la Sicilia che profuma d'oriente (Flaccovio, 2008 – ISBN 978-88-7804-440-1).
- Arnold De Vos, Il giardino persiano (Samuele, 2009).
- Angelo Scandurra, Quadreria dei poeti passanti (Bompiani, 2009 – ISBN 978-88-452-6328-6).
- AA.VV., Catania: non vi sarà facile si può fare lo facciamo (ANCE, 2009).
- Franco Battiato, Don Gesualdo: con i contributi di Manlio Sgalambro e Antonio Di Grado (Bompiani & Kasba comunicazioni, 2010).
- Domenico Cipriano, Novembre (Transeuropa, 2010 – ISBN 978-88-7580-116-8).
- Carlo Guarrera, Occhi aperti spalancati (Mesogea, 2011).

=== Music ===
==== Album ====
- Franco Battiato, L'ombrello e la macchina da cucire (EMI music Italy & L'ottava, 1995 – EAN 724383289820).
- Franco Battiato, L'imboscata (Polygram Italy & L'ottava, 1996 – EAN 731453409125), released even in Spain as La emboscada (Polygram Italy & L'ottava, 1997 – EAN 731453462120).
- Franco Battiato, L'imboscata tour (Polygram Italy & L'ottava, 1997)
- Franco Battiato, Gommalacca (Polygram Italy & L'ottava, 1998 – EAN 731455890723).
- Franco Battiato, Fleurs (Universal music Italy & L'ottava, 1999 – EAN 731454677523).
- Franco Battiato, Campi magnetici (Sony music entertainment Italy & L'ottava, 2000 – EAN 5099708928025).
- Franco Battiato, Ferro battuto (Sony music entertainment Italy & L'ottava, 2001 – EAN 5099750229590), translated even in Spain as Hierro forjado (Sony music entertainment Italy & L'ottava, 2001 – EAN 5099750345320).
- AA.VV., Invasioni (New scientist, 2001).
- Franco Battiato, Fleurs 3 (Sony music entertainment Italy & L'ottava, 2002 – EAN 5099750888421).
- Franco Battiato, Colonna sonora di Perduto amor (Sony music entertainment Italy & L'ottava, 2003 – EAN 5099751123521).
- Alice, Viaggio in Italia (NuN entertainment, 2003 – EAN 4029758504321).
- Franco Battiato, Last summer dance (Sony music entertainment Italy & L'ottava, 2003 – EAN 5099751370628).
- Franco Battiato, Dieci stratagemmi: attraversare il mare per ingannare il cielo (Sony music entertainment Italy & L'ottava, 2004 – EAN 5099751856528).
- Franco Battiato, Un soffio al cuore di natura elettrica (Sony music entertainment Italy & L'ottava, 2005 – EAN 0828767416496).
- Franco Battiato, Il vuoto (Universal music Italy & L'ottava, 2007 – EAN 0602517229723).
- Pippo Pollina, Ultimo volo: orazione civile per Ustica (Storie di note, 2007 – EAN 8032484730601).
- Lilies on Mars, Lilies on Mars (Lilies on Mars, 2008).
- Fiorella Mannoia, Il movimento del dare (Sony music entertainment Italy, 2008 – EAN 886974055525).
- Franco Battiato, Fleurs 2 (Universal music Italy & L'ottava, 2008 – EAN 0602517883819).
- Alice, Lungo la strada (EMI music Italy, 2009).
- Carmen Consoli, Elettra (Universal music Italy & Narciso records, 2009 – EAN 0602527232089).
- Franco Battiato, Inneres Auge: il tutto è più della somma delle sue parti (Universal music Italy & L'ottava, 2009 – EAN 0602527226668).
- Milva, Non conosco nessun Patrizio (Universal music Italy, 2010 – EAN 0602527485010).
- Carmen Consoli, Per niente stanca (Universal music Italy & Narciso records).

==== Singles ====
- Franco Battiato, Strani giorni (Polygram Italy & L'ottava, 1996 – EAN 731457869420).
- Franco Battiato, Shock in my town (Polygram Italy & L'ottava, 1998 – EAN 731456637921).
- Franco Battiato, Il ballo del potere (Polygram Italy & L'ottava, 1996).
- Franco Battiato, Running against the grain (Sony music entertainment Italy & L'ottava, 2001 – EAN 5099750112922).
- Alice, Come un sigillo (NuN entertainment, 2003).
- Franco Battiato, Il vuoto (Universal music Italy & L'ottava, 2007).
- Franco Battiato, Tutto l'universo obbedisce all'amore (Universal music Italy & L'ottava, 2008).
- Franco Battiato, Inneres Auge (Universal music Italy & L'ottava, 2009).

==== Songs ====
- L'ombrello e la macchina da cucire (1995 – lyrics by Manlio Sgalambro; music by Franco Battiato).
- Breve invito a rinviare il suicidio (1995 – lyrics by Manlio Sgalambro; music by Franco Battiato).
- Piccolo pub (1995 – lyrics by Manlio Sgalambro; music by Franco Battiato).
- Fornicazione (1995 – lyrics by Manlio Sgalambro; music by Franco Battiato).
- Gesualdo da Venosa (1995 – lyrics by Manlio Sgalambro; music by Franco Battiato).
- Moto browniano (1995 – lyrics by Manlio Sgalambro; music by Franco Battiato).
- Tao (1995 – lyrics by Manlio Sgalambro; music by Franco Battiato).
- Un vecchio cameriere (1995 – lyrics by Manlio Sgalambro; music by Franco Battiato).
- L'esistenza di Dio (1995 – lyrics by Manlio Sgalambro; music by Franco Battiato).
- Di passaggio (1996 – lyrics by Franco Battiato and Manlio Sgalambro; music by Franco Battiato).
- Strani giorni (1996 – lyrics by Manlio Sgalambro; music by Franco Battiato).
- La cura (1996 – lyrics by Franco Battiato and Manlio Sgalambro; music by Franco Battiato).
- Ein Tag aus dem Leben des kleinen Johannes (1996 – lyrics by Manlio Sgalambro; music by Franco Battiato).
- Amata solitudine (1996 – lyrics by Manlio Sgalambro; music by Franco Battiato).
- Splendide previsioni (1996 – lyrics by Manlio Sgalambro and Fleur Jaeggy; music by Franco Battiato).
- Ecco com'è che va il mondo (1996 – lyrics by Manlio Sgalambro; music by Franco Battiato).
- Segunda-feira (1996 – lyrics by Manlio Sgalambro; music by Franco Battiato).
- Memoria di Giulia (1996 – lyrics by Manlio Sgalambro; music by Franco Battiato).
- Serial killer (1996 – lyrics by Manlio Sgalambro; music by Franco Battiato).
- Decline and fall of the Roman empire (1996 – lyrics by Manlio Sgalambro; music by Franco Battiato).
- Shock in my town (1998 – lyrics by Franco Battiato and Manlio Sgalambro; music by Franco Battiato).
- Auto da fé (1998 – lyrics by Franco Battiato and Manlio Sgalambro; music by Franco Battiato).
- Casta diva (1998 – lyrics by Franco Battiato and Manlio Sgalambro; music by Franco Battiato).
- Il ballo del potere (1998 – lyrics by Franco Battiato and Manlio Sgalambro; music by Franco Battiato).
- La preda (1998 – lyrics by Manlio Sgalambro; music by Franco Battiato).
- Il mantello e la spiga (1998 – lyrics by Manlio Sgalambro; music by Franco Battiato).
- È stato molto bello (1998 – lyrics by Manlio Sgalambro; music by Franco Battiato).
- Quello che fu (1998 – lyrics by Manlio Sgalambro; music by Franco Battiato).
- Vite parallele (1998 – lyrics by Manlio Sgalambro; music by Franco Battiato).
- E.Shackleton (1998 – lyrics by Manlio Sgalambro and Fleur Jaeggy; music by Franco Battiato).
- Stage door (1998 – lyrics by Franco Battiato and Manlio Sgalambro; music by Franco Battiato).
- Emma (1998 – lyrics by Manlio Sgalambro; music by Franco Battiato).
- L'incantesimo (1998 – lyrics by Manlio Sgalambro; music by Franco Battiato).
- Medievale (1999 – lyrics by Manlio Sgalambro; music by Franco Battiato).
- Invito al viaggio (1999 – lyrics by Manlio Sgalambro; music by Franco Battiato).
- Running against the grain (2001 – lyrics by Manlio Sgalambro and Franco Battiato; music by Franco Battiato).
- Bist du bei mir (2001 – lyrics by Manlio Sgalambro and Franco Battiato; music by Franco Battiato).
- La quiete dopo un addio (2001 – lyrics by Manlio Sgalambro and Franco Battiato; music by Franco Battiato).
- Personalità empirica (2001 – lyrics by Manlio Sgalambro and Franco Battiato; music by Franco Battiato).
- Il cammino interminabile (2001 – lyrics by Manlio Sgalambro; music by Franco Battiato).
- Lontananze d'azzurro (2001 – lyrics by Manlio Sgalambro and Franco Battiato; music by Franco Battiato).
- Sarcofagia (2001 – lyrics by Manlio Sgalambro; music by Franco Battiato).
- Scherzo in minore (2001 – lyrics by Franco Battiato and Manlio Sgalambro; music by Franco Battiato, Django Reinhardt and Stéphane Grappelli).
- Il potere del canto (2001 – lyrics by Manlio Sgalambro; music by Franco Battiato).
- Invasione di campo (2001 – lyrics by Manlio Sgalambro; music by Luca Nuzzolo).
- Come un sigillo (2002 – lyrics by Franco Battiato and Manlio Sgalambro; music by Franco Battiato).
- Tra sesso e castità (2004 – lyrics by Manlio Sgalambro and Franco Battiato; music by Franco Battiato).
- Le aquile non volano a stormi (2004 – lyrics by Manlio Sgalambro and Franco Battiato; music by Kinimori Yajima and Franco Battiato).
- Ermeneutica (2004 – lyrics by Manlio Sgalambro and Franco Battiato; music by Franco Battiato).
- Fortezza Bastiani (2004 – lyrics by Franco Battiato and Manlio Sgalambro; music by Franco Battiato).
- Odore di polvere da sparo (2004 – lyrics by Manlio Sgalambro; music by Franco Battiato and Krisma).
- Conforto alla vita (2004 – lyrics by Manlio Sgalambro; music by Franco Battiato).
- 23 coppie di cromosomi (2004 – lyrics by Manlio Sgalambro; music by Franco Battiato and Krisma).
- Apparenza e realtà (2004 – lyrics by Manlio Sgalambro and Franco Battiato; music by Franco Battiato and Krisma).
- La porta dello spavento supremo (2004 – lyrics by Franco Battiato and Manlio Sgalambro; music by Franco Battiato).
- Il vuoto (2007 – lyrics by Franco Battiato and Manlio Sgalambro; music by Franco Battiato).
- I giorni della monotonia (2007 – lyrics by Franco Battiato and Manlio Sgalambro; music by Franco Battiato).
- Aspettando l'estate (2007 – lyrics by Manlio Sgalambro; music by Franco Battiato).
- Niente è come sembra (2007 – lyrics by Franco Battiato and Manlio Sgalambro; music by Franco Battiato).
- Tiepido aprile (2007 – lyrics by Franco Battiato and Manlio Sgalambro; music by Franco Battiato).
- The game is over (2007 – lyrics by Franco Battiato and Manlio Sgalambro; music by Franco Battiato).
- Io chi sono (2007 – lyrics by Franco Battiato and Manlio Sgalambro; music by Franco Battiato).
- Stati di gioia (2007 – lyrics by Franco Battiato and Manlio Sgalambro; music by Franco Battiato).
- Il movimento del dare (2008 – lyrics by Manlio Sgalambro and Franco Battiato; music by Franco Battiato).
- Tutto l'universo obbedisce all'amore (2008 – lyrics by Manlio Sgalambro; music by Franco Battiato).
- Tibet (2008 – lyrics by Manlio Sgalambro and Franco Battiato; music by Franco Battiato).
- Marie ti amiamo (2009 – lyrics by Franco Battiato, Carmen Consoli and Manlio Sgalambro; music by Franco Battiato and Carmen Consoli).
- Inneres Auge (2009 – lyrics by Franco Battiato and Manlio Sgalambro; music by Franco Battiato).
- 'U cuntu (2009 – lyrics by Franco Battiato and Manlio Sgalambro; music by Franco Battiato).
- Non conosco nessun Patrizio (2010 – lyrics by Manlio Sgalambro; music by Franco Battiato and Juri Camisasca).

=== Cinema ===
==== Movies, writer ====
- Franco Battiato, Lost Love (2003) (L'ottava & Sidecar – OCLC 60776889).
- Franco Battiato, Musikanten (2005) (L'ottava & RAI cinema – OCLC 234237035).
- Franco Battiato, Niente è come sembra (2007) (Bompiani & L'ottava – ISBN 978-88-452-5978-4).

==== Documentaries ====
- Daniele Consoli, La verità sul caso del signor Ciprì e Maresco (Zelig, 2004).
- Guido Cionini, Manlio Sgalambro: il consolatore (Nexmedia, 2006).
- Franco Battiato, Auguri don Gesualdo (Bompiani & Kasba comunicazioni, 2010 – ISBN 978-88-452-6586-0).

==== Videos ====
- Franco Battiato, L'ombrello e la macchina da cucire (1995).
- Franco Battiato, Di passaggio (1996).
- Franco Battiato, Strani giorni (1996).
- Franco Battiato, Shock in my town (1998).
- Franco Battiato, Running against the grain (2001).
- Franco Battiato, Bist du bei mir (2001).
- Franco Battiato, Ermeneutica (2004).
- Franco Battiato, La porta dello spavento supremo (2004).
- Franco Battiato, Il vuoto (2007).
- Franco Battiato, Inneres Auge (2009).

=== Theater ===
- Manlio Sgalambro & Franco Battiato, Il cavaliere dell'intelletto: opera in due atti per l'ottocentenario della nascita di Federico II di Svevia (1994).
- Manlio Sgalambro & Franco Battiato, Socrate impazzito (1995).
- Manlio Sgalambro & Franco Battiato, Gli Schopenhauer (1998).
- Igor Stravinsky, L'histoire du soldat (1999).
- Franco Battiato, Campi magnetici: i numeri non si possono amare (2000).
- Pippo Pollina, Ultimo volo: orazione civile per ustica (2007).
- Manlio Sgalambro, Carlo Guarrera & Rosalba Bentivoglio, Frammenti per versi e voce (2009).

=== Television ===
- Franco Battiato, Bitte keine réclame (2004).

== Curiosities ==
=== Music ===
- In Di passaggio (from L'imboscata), he declaims in (ancient Greek):

This tension lives both nationally and quickly and to everyone, both young and old, but after they have fallen, they are evil again.

— Heraclitus, Fragments

- In Invito al viaggio (from Fleurs), he declaims (in Italian):

I invite you to the voyage in the land that is like you. The misty sunlights of those cloudy skies have for my spirit the charm of your treacherous eyes, shining brightly. There all is order and beauty, luxury, peace, and pleasure; the world falls asleep in a warm glow of light; see on the canals those vessels sleeping: their mood is adventurous to satisfy your slightest desires.

— Charles Baudelaire, Les fleurs du mal

- In Corpi in movimento (from Campi magnetici), he declaims (in Italian):

If, in speaking of my points, I think of some system of things, e.g., the system: love, law, chimney-sweep… and then assume all my axioms as relations between these things, then my propositions, e.g., Pythagoras' theorem, are also valid for these things.

— David Hilbert, Letter to Frege of 29 December 1899

Since 1996, he participates in almost every Franco Battiato's tours:

- In '97 he declaims (in Latin) on Battiato's song Areknames (from Pollution), renamed for the occasion Canzone chimica:

Bacterium flourescens liquefaciens, Bacterium histolyticum, Bacterium mesentericum, Bacterium sporagenes, Bacterium putrificus…

— Manlio Sgalambro, Canzone chimica

- In 2002, he sings a new version – with lyrics adapted philosophically – of Accetta il consiglio (taken from The big Kahuna), published the next year in live album Last summer dance.

=== Acting: movies ===
- In Lost Love (2003), he played Martino Alliata, philosophy teacher of the leading character (Corrado Fortuna).
- In Musikanten (2005), he played a nobleman from Siena.

=== Acting: theatre ===
- He played the narrator in L'histoire du soldat and in Campi magnetici.
