= Gianni Bedori =

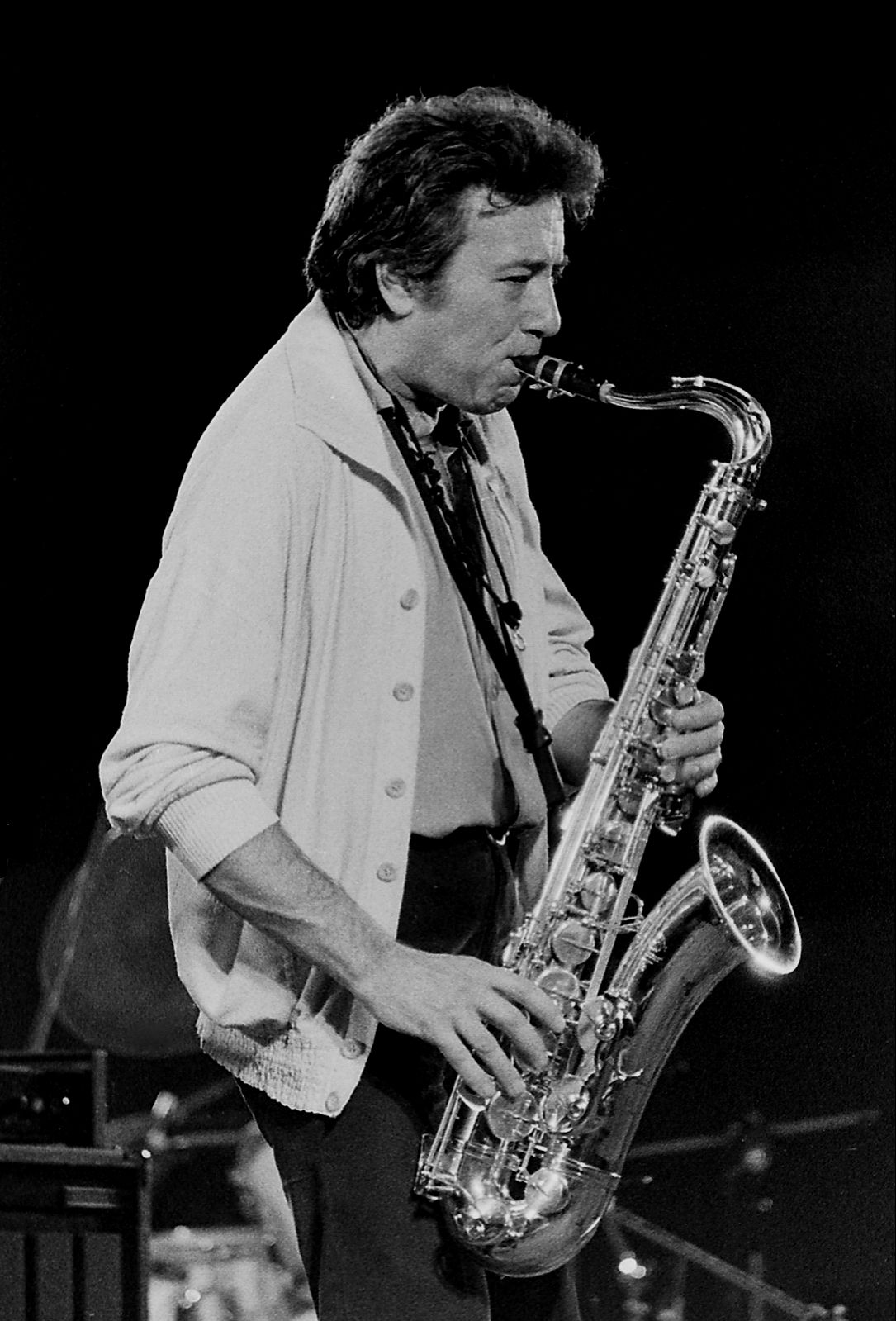
- Gianni Bedori in 1980; Photo: Jazz Photogrpher Cesare Rotondo

Background information
- Born: 25 November 1930; Mantua, Italy
- Died: 21 January 2005 (aged 74) Milan, Italy
- Genres: Jazz, Easy listening, Pop
- Occupations: Saxophonist, flautist, composer
- Instruments: Saxophone, flute

Gianni Bedori (25 November 1930 – 21 January 2005), also known as Johnny Sax, was an Italian jazz saxophonist, clarinetist, flautist and composer.

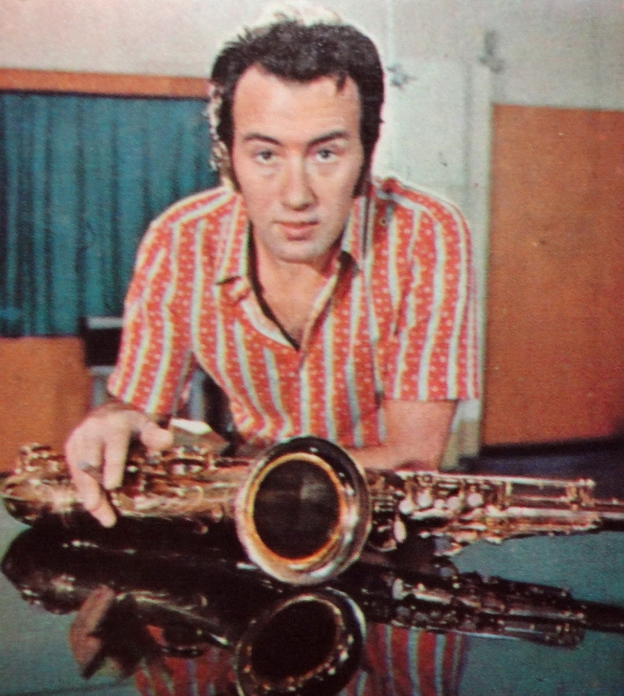
Gianni Bedori 1969

== Career ==
Born in Mantua, Bedori graduated in clarinet at the Conservatorio Giovanni Battista Martini in Bologna and started his career with singer Enzo Amadori. He became first known in 1963, when he started a twenty years-long collaboration with composer Giorgio Gaslini. In 1973 his sax solo suite "Dedicated to Picasso" received much critical acclaim. In the 1970s he achieved significant commercial success with a series of easy listening jazz albums he released under the pseudonym Johnny Sax.

His composition "Jesus' Last Ballad" was recorded by pianist Bill Evans on Evans' album Affinity (1979).

Bedori also collaborated with such arrangers as Augusto Martelli and Pino Presti and appeared on several of singer Mina's recordings. He also played with Italian experimental musician Franco Battiato and was a guest on his 1974 album Clic released on the Island Records label.

== Discography ==
Albums

- 1969 – Johnny Sax incontro con Bob Mitchell (PDU)
- 1971 – Sortilege (Sun Records, SUld 13004)
- 1973 – International hits collection – Vol. I (PDU, Pld.A 5055)
- 1973 – International hits collection – Vol. II (PDU, Pld.M 5086)
- 1973 – Hit parade – Vol. I (Produttori Associati, PAF/LP/3005)
- 1973 – Successi sempreverdi – Vol. II (Produttori Associati, PAF/LP/3006)
- 1973 – Liscio parade – Vol. III (Produttori Associati, PAF/LP/3007)
- 1974 – Johnny Sax – Vol. IV (Produttori Associati, PAF/LP/3009)
- 1974 – Dedicated to Picasso – A solo Album (PDU, Pld.A 5074)
- 1975 – Johnny Sax – Vol. V (Produttori Associati, PAF/LP/3014)
- 1976 – Non stop 1 (Produttori Associati, SAX/1715)
- 1976 – Sax in motion (Produttori Associat, 6.22.627)
- 1977 – The Man (Atlantic, T 50402) – As Gianni Bedori
- 1978 – 7 – Soft Sound (Ariston, ARM/42001)
- 1982 – Senza... Paoli (Wep, ZNLW 33197)
- 1983 – Lo strumento della voce umana (Wep, ZNLW 33343)
- 1987 – Le canzoni d'amore di Gino Paoli (Replay music, RMCD 4121)
- 2004 – Controtempo (Splasc(h))

Singles

- 1969 - Hi-Heel Sneakers/Eleonore (Sun Records, SU 10076)
- 1971 - Processione/Alone again (PDU, P.A. 1080)
- 1971 - The morning after/Ultimo tango a Parigi (PDU, P.A. 1088)
- 1974 - Snoopy/Senza Lei (Produttori Associati, PA/NP/3230)
- 1975 - Popsy/Anonimus (Produttori Associati, PA/NP/3240)
- 1975 - Nuovo mondo/Theme for a Sweetheart lady (Produttori Associati, PA/NP/3247)
- 1976 - Emmanuelle 2 (L'antivergine)/Tara tara (Produttori Associati, PA/NP/3263)
- 1976 - Piccolo cielo/Nuovo mondo (Produttori Associati, PA/NP/3255)
