= Gommalacca =

Studio album by Franco Battiato
- Released: 18 September 1998
- Genres: Electronic, rock
- Length: 44:28
- Label: PolyGram
- Producer: Franco Battiato

Franco Battiato chronology
L'imboscata (1996)	Gommalacca (1998)	Fleurs (1999)

Gommalacca (Italian for "Shellac") is a studio album by Italian singer-songwriter Franco Battiato, issued in 1998.

== Production ==
Battiato worked on Gommalacca for a year and a half. The album was recorded between Battiato's house in Catania, Stonehenge Studio in Peschiera Borromeo and two recording studios in Milan, Next and Nautilus. Musicians involved in this album include Gavin Harrison, Morgan and Marco Pancaldi from Bluvertigo, and Ru Catania from Africa Unite, with Fleur Jaeggy (credited as Carlotta Wieck), Ginevra Di Marco and Andrea Pezzi providing backing vocals. Cover art was ideated by Sergio Pappalettera from Studio Prodesign.

== Release and reception ==
Anticipated by the lead single "Shock in My Town", the album was released on 24 September 1998. It won the Targa Tenco as best album of the year.

The album was described as "vigorous and inspired [...] with hard and distorted sounds and bold samples set in lavish arrangements." Annino La Posta wrote: "Gommalacca is a bold and hard-edged album - at times swirling and restless - yet, as often occurs in Battiato's work, occasionally the sonic architecture recedes and allows glimpses of lyrical beauty to emerge."

== Track listing ==
No.	Title	Lyrics	Music	Length
1.	"Shock in My Town"	Franco Battiato, Manlio Sgalambro	Battiato	4:24
2.	"Auto da fé"	Battiato, Sgalambro	Battiato	3:59
3.	"Casta Diva"	Battiato, Sgalambro	Battiato	3:38
4.	"Il ballo del potere"	Battiato, Sgalambro	Battiato	4:26
5.	"La preda"	Sgalambro	Battiato	3:44
6.	"Il mantello e la spiga"	Sgalambro	Battiato	3:59
7.	"È stato molto bello"	Sgalambro	Battiato	3:49
8.	"Quello che fu"	Sgalambro	Battiato	4:30
9.	"Vite parallele"	Sgalambro	Battiato	3:24
10.	"Shakleton"	Sgalambro, Fleur Jaeggy	Battiato	8:35

== Charts ==
Weekly chart performance for Gommalacca
Chart (1998)	Peak position
Italian Albums (FIMI)	1
