= Apriti sesamo =

Studio album by Franco Battiato
- Released: 23 October 2012
- Length: 36:36
- Label: Universal Music Group

Franco Battiato chronology
Inneres Auge (2009)	Apriti sesamo (2012)	Del suo veloce volo (2013)

Apriti sesamo ('Open Sesame') is a studio album by Italian singer-songwriter Franco Battiato, released by Universal Music Group in 2012. It is the last Battiato's album entirely consisting of new songs.

== Production ==
The album was recorded at Pinaxa Studios in Milan, and among the musicians who collaborated to the album were Gavin Harrison, Simon Tong, Nicola "Faso" Fasani from Elio e le Storie Tese and Nuovo Quartetto Italiano. The album's lyrics primarily focus on the theme of death, while the music features fewer electronic elements and leans more toward classical arrangements compared to Battiato's recent works.

Cover art was cured by Francesco Messina, and it is inspired by Sogyal Rinpoche's The Tibetan Book of Living and Dying.

== Release ==
Anticipated by the lead single "Passacaglia", the album was released on 23 October 2012. It was also is also published in a Spanish edition titled Ábrete Sésamo and as Open Sesame in an international version that includes two English-language adaptations.

== Track listing ==
Apriti sesamo track listing
No.	Title	Lyrics	Music	Length
1.	"Un irresistibile richiamo"	Franco Battiato, Manlio Sgalambro	Battiato	3:37
2.	"Testamento"	Battiato, Sgalambro	Battiato	3:36
3.	"Quand'ero giovane"	Battiato, Sgalambro	Battiato	3:44
4.	"Eri con me"	Battiato, Sgalambro	Battiato	4:00
5.	"Passacaglia"	Battiato, Sgalambro	Battiato	3:24
6.	"La polvere del branco"	Battiato, Sgalambro	Battiato	3:59
7.	"Caliti junku"	Battiato, Sgalambro	Battiato	3:21
8.	"Aurora"	Sgalambro, Nabil Salameh	Battiato	3:44
9.	"Il serpente"	Battiato, Sgalambro	Battiato	3:37
10.	"Apriti sesamo"	Battiato, Sgalambro	Battiato	3:33

== Charts ==
=== Weekly charts ===
Chart performance for Apriti sesamo
Chart (2012–13)	Peak position
Italian Albums (FIMI)	1

=== Year-end charts ===
Year-end chart performance for Apriti sesamo
Chart (2012)	Position
Italian Albums (FIMI)	34
