= Il vuoto =

Studio album by Franco Battiato
- Released: 2007
- Genre: Electronic; rock
- Length: 33:20
- Label: Universal Music Group
- Producer: Franco Battiato

Franco Battiato chronology
Un soffio al cuore di natura elettrica (2005)	Il vuoto (2007)	Fleurs 2 (2008)

Il vuoto (Italian for "The void") is a studio album by Italian singer-songwriter Franco Battiato, issued in 2007. Its songs have as a common theme the spiritual void.

Battiato performed the songs "Il vuoto" and "I giorni della monotonia" out of competition at the 57th edition of the Sanremo Music Festival.

== Track listing ==
- Music by Franco Battiato. Lyrics by Manlio Sgalambro except where noted.
1. "Il vuoto" (featuring MAB) – 3:32
2. "I giorni della monotonia" – 3:15
3. "Aspettando l'estate" – 3:31
4. "Niente è come sembra" – 3:34
5. "Tiepido aprile" – 3:12
6. "The Game Is Over" – 4:33
7. "Era l'inizio della primavera" – 3:01 (music: Pyotr Ilyich Tchaikovsky, lyrics: Aleksey Konstantinovich Tolstoy)
8. "Io chi sono?" – 3:30
9. "Stati di gioia" – 4:46

== Charts ==
Chart	Peak position
Italy	1
