= Roberto Mancinelli =

Roberto Mancinelli may refer to:

- Roberto Mancinelli (A&R)
- Roberto Mancinelli (footballer)
