= Caffè de la Paix =

Studio album by Franco Battiato
- Released: 1993
- Length: 31:24
- Label: EMI Italiana

Franco Battiato chronology
Come un cammello in una grondaia (1991)	Caffè de la Paix (1993)	L'ombrello e la macchina da cucire (1995)

Caffè de la Paix is the seventeenth studio album by Italian singer-songwriter Franco Battiato, released in 1993.

== Background ==
Following the two operas Genesi and Gilgamesh and the classical music-influenced Come un cammello in una grondaia, Caffè de la Paix represents a partial return of Battiato to a more modern song form, mostly because of its use of electric guitars and the return of a rhythm section. The album's arrangements ends to combine classical orchestral sounds, modern sounds and traditional oriental sounds, mostly thanks to the use of traditional instruments such as oud, qanun, sarod, tabla and tambouras.

== Production ==
The album was recorded between Real World Studios in London and Morning Studio in Milan. Among the musicians who collaborated to the album, were Gavin Harrison, John Giblin, Jakko Jakszyk and Hossam Ramzy. It is the first Battiato album from 1979 L'era del cinghiale bianco on which Giusto Pio does not collaborate. The album and the lead single are titled after the Café de la Paix in Paris.

== Release ==
The album was released on 7 October 1993.

== Track listing ==
Caffè de la Paix track listing
No.	Title	Writer(s)	Length
1.	"Caffè de la Paix"	Franco Battiato	4:26
2.	"Fogh in Nakhal"	Traditional	3:33
3.	"Atlantide"	Battiato; Fleur Jaeggy	3:58
4.	"Sui giardini della preesistenza"	Battiato	3:48
5.	"Delenda Carthago"	Battiato; Angelo Arioli	3:59
6.	"Ricerca sul terzo"	Battiato	3:59
7.	"Lode all'inviolato"	Battiato	3:53
8.	"Haiku"	Battiato; Arioli	3:48

== Charts ==
Chart performance for Caffè de la Paix
Chart (1993)	Peak position
Italian Albums (Musica e dischi)	3
