= Clic (album) =

Studio album by Franco Battiato
- Released: 23 November 1974
- Recorded: Chantelain, Rome
- Studio: Regson Studio
- Genre: Electronic; Experimental rock Progressive rock Ambient
- Label: Bla Bla, Island
- Producer: Pino Massara

"Propiedad_Prohibida"
An audio sample of "Propiedad prohibida"

Clic is a 1974 album by Italian experimental musician Franco Battiato. The album, released on the Bla Bla label (catalogue BBXL 10006) is a brooding and intense collection of instrumental/vocal arrangements. Dedicated to Karlheinz Stockhausen, the music has stylistic similarities with Philip Glass and Tangerine Dream, but is more lyrical and has elements of musique concrète.

It was also released on 23 November 1974, on the Island label (ILPS 9323), in the UK with a different tracklist.

== Reception ==
Reviewing the 1998 re-release of album for AllMusic, Ned Raggett said:

Aside from backing vocals and a string quartet, everything else is Battiato's doing, with the Krautrock touches apparent in his previous work starting to surface all the more readily here. Things are generally more meditative and reflective, though certainly Battiato isn't far from his usual wry humor (thus "Propriedad Prohibida," the title of his bitterly wry take on more-leftist-than-thou Italian bands of the time like Area, though the song itself is a quietly entrancing instrumental). ... "Il Mercato Degli Dei" is as representative of the album as anything, an instrumental composed of various parts and consisting almost entirely of Battiato's various keyboard explorations arranged and overdubbed, but emphasizing calm, quiet arrangements rather than Rick Wakeman-like orgies of sound. "I Cancelli Della Memoria" makes for a great start to the album, soothing Tangerine Dream-like airs and bubbling synth bass loops mixing with everything from (apparently) Battiato's own sax work to his more expected piano parts.

== Musicians ==
- Franco Battiato – voice, piano, keyboards, VCS3, kalimba, special effects
- Gianni Mocchetti – bass, electric guitar
- Gianfranco D'Adda – percussion
- Gianni Bedori – saxophones
- Jutta Nienhaus – vocals on "Revolution in the Air"
- Juri Camisasca – vocals

== Other personnel ==
- Producer: Pino Massara
- Art Director: Franco Battiato, Peppo Delconte
- Designer: Mario Covertino
- Photography: Roberto Masotti

== Track listing (original 1974 release) ==
- All music and lyrics by Franco Battiato:
1. "I cancelli della memoria" (6:16) (Italian: "The Gates of Memory")
2. "No U Turn" (4:54)
3. "Il mercato degli dei" (4:30) (Italian: "The Market of the Gods")
4. "Rien ne va plus: andante" (2:47) (French: "Nothing Is Going Well Anymore")
5. "Propiedad prohibida" (5:24) (Spanish: "Prohibited Property")
6. "Nel cantiere di un'infanzia" (4:33) (Italian: "Construction of a Childhood")
7. "Ethika Fon Ethica" (3:53)

== Track listing (1974 UK release) ==
- All music and lyrics by Franco Battiato:

=== Side one ===
1. "Propiedad Prohibida"
2. "No U Turn"
3. "Gates of Memory"

=== Side two ===
1. "Revolution In The Air"
