= Fetus (disambiguation) =

Fetus or foetus refers to a stage in prenatal development.

Fetus or Foetus may also refer to:

- Fetus (album), a 1972 album by Franco Battiato
- Foetus (band), Australian musical project of JG Thirlwell
- Foetus (film), a 1994 Hungarian film
- Fetus in fetu, a developmental abnormality
- Campylobacter fetus, a species of bacteria
- "Fetus", a song by Nas from the album The Lost Tapes
