= Come un cammello in una grondaia =

Studio album by Franco Battiato
- Released: 1991
- Length: 32:08
- Label: EMI Italiana

Franco Battiato chronology
Fisiognomica (1988)	Come un cammello in una grondaia (1991)	Caffè de la Paix (1993)

Come un cammello in una grondaia (lit. 'Like a camel in a gutter') is the sixteenth studio album by Italian singer-songwriter Franco Battiato, released in 1991. A Spanish-language version of the album, Como un camello en un canalón, was released two years later.

== Background ==
Following his song "L'oceano di silenzio", in which he had already experimented very bare and classical arrangements, his 1988 opera Genesi and his musical score for the 1990 film A Violent Life, Battiato got the inspiration for this album from his renewed interest in the classical genre. On 16 July 1991, he took part in a classical music festival in Fermo where he performed four lieder, by Ludwig van Beethoven, Richard Wagner, Johannes Brahms and Jean-Paul-Égide Martini, which Battiato considered the peak of the genre. The lieder became the second part of the album, with four compositions of Battiato occupying the first part.

== Production ==
The album was recorded at Abbey Road Studios in London. Characterized from the absence of any rhythm section, Battiato was accompanied by Roger Chase, Anthony Pleeth, Gavyn Wright, the Astarte Orchestra of London conducted by Antonio Ballista and Giusto Pio and the Ambrosian Singers of London choir conducted by John McCarthy. The title is a citation from 11th-century Persian scholar Al-Biruni.

== Release ==
The album was released on 8 November 1991. It peaked on the tenth place on Italian hit parade and sold over 250,000 copies.

== Track listing ==
No.	Title	Writer(s)	Length
1.	"Povera patria"	Franco Battiato	3:45
2.	"Le sacre sinfonie del tempo"	Battiato	3:45
3.	"Come un cammello in una grondaia"	Battiato; Fleur Jaeggy	3:31
4.	"L'ombra della luce"	Battiato	4:54
5.	"Schmerzen"	Richard Wagner	2:50
6.	"Plaisir d'amour"	Jean-Paul-Égide Martini	3:57
7.	"Gestillte Sehnsucht"	Johannes Brahms	5:48
8.	"Oh Sweet Were the Hours"	Ludwig van Beethoven	3:38

== Charts ==
Chart (1991–92)	Peak position
Italy (Musica e dischi)	10
