= Fleurs (Franco Battiato album) =

Studio album by Franco Battiato
- Released: 22 October 1999
- Genre: Pop
- Length: 41:05
- Label: Mercury (Universal Music Italia)
- Producer: Franco Battiato

Franco Battiato chronology
Gommalacca (1997)	Fleurs (1999)	Ferro battuto (2001)

Fleurs, also graphically rendered as Fleur(s) and FLEURs, is a studio album by Italian singer-songwriter Franco Battiato, issued in 1999. Except for two new songs, the album consists of cover versions of Italian and international classics, mainly from the 1960s. The album was described as "delicate, elegant and enjoyable." The album was followed by Fleurs 3 (2002) and Fleurs 2 (2008). The Battiato's version of The Rolling Stones' "Ruby Tuesday" was later featured in the musical score of Alfonso Cuarón's 2006 film Children of Men.

== Track listing ==
1. "La canzone dell'amore perduto" – 3:26 (Fabrizio De André)
2. "Ruby Tuesday" – 3:36 (Mick Jagger, Keith Richards)
3. "J'entends siffler le train" – 3:09 (Hedy West, Richard Anthony)
4. "Aria di neve" – 2:52 (Sergio Endrigo)
5. "Ed io tra di voi" – 2:53 (Sergio Bardotti, Charles Aznavour)
6. "Te lo leggo negli occhi" – 3:03 (Sergio Bardotti, Sergio Endrigo)
7. "La canzone dei vecchi amanti (La chanson des vieux amants)" – 3:25 (Jacques Brel)
8. "Era de maggio" – 3:26 (Mario Pasquale Costa, Salvatore Di Giacomo)
9. "Che cosa resta (Que reste-t-il de nos amour)" – 3:27 (Charles Trenet, Gesualdo Bufalino)
10. "Amore che vieni, amore che vai" – 2:27 (Fabrizio De André)
11. "Medievale" – 2:37 (Manlio Sgalambro, Franco Battiato)
12. "Invito al viaggio" – 6:44 (Charles Baudelaire, Manlio Sgalambro, Franco Battiato)

== Charts ==
Weekly chart performance for Fleurs
Chart (1999)	Peak position
Italian Albums (FIMI)	4

=== Year-end charts ===
Year-end chart performance for Fleurs
Chart (2002)	Position
Italian Albums (FIMI)	20

== Certifications ==
Certifications for Fleurs
Region	Certification	Certified units/sales
Italy (FIMI) Sales from 2009	Gold	25,000^{‡}
^{‡} Sales+streaming figures based on certification alone.
