= L'ombrello e la macchina da cucire =

Studio album by Franco Battiato
- Released: 1995
- Length: 41:42
- Label: EMI Italiana

Franco Battiato chronology
Caffè de la Paix (1993)	L'ombrello e la macchina da cucire (1995)	L'imboscata (1996)

L'ombrello e la macchina da cucire (lit. 'The umbrella and the sewing machine') is the eighteenth studio album by Italian singer-songwriter Franco Battiato, released in 1995.

== Background ==
Following their collaboration in the 1994 opera Il cavaliere dell’intelletto ('The Knight of Intellect'), Battiato asked philosopher Manlio Sgalambro to write the lyrics for his next album; their professional partnership eventually lasted until Sgalambro's death in 2014.

== Production ==
The album initially had the working title Golpe. It was recorded between Battiato's house in Milo (credited as "L'Ottava") and Fonoprint Studio in Bologna. Among the musicians who collaborated to the album, were former Denovo's members Mario Venuti, Luca Madonia and Toni Carbone and Japanese soprano Hiroko Saito. The album and the lead single titles are based on a verse of the Isidore Ducasse's poem Les Chants de Maldoror.

== Release and reception ==
The album was released on 24 March 1995. The cryptic lyrics of Sgalambro, akin to a stream of consciousness and rich in erudite references, disoriented Battiato's long-standing fans, and the album sold over 100,000 copies, being Battiato's lowest selling album since Patriots.

== Track listing ==
No.	Title	Writer(s)	Length
1.	"L'ombrello e la macchina da cucire"	Franco Battiato, Manlio Sgalambro	4:20
2.	"Breve invito a rinviare il suicidio"	Battiato, Sgalambro	4:19
3.	"Piccolo pub"	Battiato, Sgalambro	4:03
4.	"Fornicazione"	Battiato, Sgalambro	4:19
5.	"Gesualdo da Venosa"	Battiato, Sgalambro	4:08
6.	"Moto browniano"	Battiato, Sgalambro	4:43
7.	"Tao"	Battiato, Sgalambro	4:01
8.	"Un vecchio cameriere"	Battiato, Sgalambro	4:11
9.	"L'esistenza di Dio"	Battiato, Sgalambro	7:38

== Charts ==
Chart (1995)	Peak position
Italy (Musica e dischi)	12
