= L'imboscata =

Studio album by Franco Battiato
- Released: 23 October 1996
- Genres: Electronic, rock
- Length: 39:20
- Label: Mercury Records
- Producer: Franco Battiato

Franco Battiato chronology
L'ombrello e la macchina da cucire (1995)	L'imboscata (1996)	Gommalacca (1998)

L'imboscata (Italian for "The ambush") is a studio album by Italian singer-songwriter Franco Battiato, released by Mercury Records in 1996. After some more experimental albums and meditative songs, the album marked the return of Battiato to a rock sound and to a massive commercial success, mainly pushed by the success of the song "La cura".

== Production ==
For this album Battiato changed his songwriting approach, composing most of the music on guitar rather than piano.

The album was recorded between June and August 1996 at Plus XXX Studio in Paris and Digital Studio in Capri. Among the musicians who collaborated to the album, were David Rhodes, Gavin Harrison, Antonella Ruggiero, Giovanni Lindo Ferretti, and Nicola Walker Smith (the wife and collaborator of composer Geoff Smith).

Antoine-Jean Gros' Battle of the Pyramids was chosen as cover art. The album was dedicated to the Sicilian novelist Gesualdo Bufalino, who had died in June.

== Release and reception ==
Anticipated by the lead single "Strani giorni", the album was released on 24 October 1996. It was the first album of Battiato with Mercury Records, after 17 years with EMI. The album was also released in a limited edition, which included a booklet with writings of Sgalambro and Battiato, plus Battiato's paintings illustrating each song. In 1997, it was released a Spanish-language version of the album, La Emboscada. The same year, it was released the VHS L'Imboscata Tour 1997, with the songs of the album performed by Battiato in a concert at Forum di Assago on 4 April 1997.

The album marked a return to commercial success for Battiato, and in a few weeks it sold twice as much as the previous album.

== Track listing ==
1. "Di passaggio" - 3:35 (lyrics: Franco Battiato, Manlio Sgalambro)
2. "Strani giorni" - 3:57
3. "La cura" - 4:01 (lyrics: Franco Battiato, Manlio Sgalambro)
4. "... ein Tag aus dem Leben des kleinen Johannes" - 3:47
5. "Amata solitudine" - 4:04
6. "Splendide previsioni" - 3:52
7. "Ecco com'è che va il mondo" - 4:21
8. "Segunda feira" - 3:59
9. "Memorie di Giulia" - 3:16
10. "Serial killer" - 4:06
- Music by Franco Battiato. Lyrics by Manlio Sgalambro except when noted.

== Charts ==
=== Weekly charts ===
Weekly chart performance for L'imboscata
Chart (1997)	Peak position
Italian Albums (FIMI)	2

=== Year-end charts ===
Year-end chart performance for L'imboscata
Chart (1996)	Position
Italian Albums (Hit Parade)	9
