= Fisiognomica =

Studio album by Franco Battiato
- Released: 9 April 1988
- Recorded: 1988
- Genre: Italian singer-songwriters
- Length: 31:12
- Label: EMI Italiana
- Producer: Enrico Maghenzani

Franco Battiato chronology
Nomadas (1987)	Fisiognomica (1988)	Giubbe rosse (1989)

Fisiognomica (transl. Physiognomy) is an album by Italian singer-songwriter Franco Battiato, released by EMI Italiana on 9 April 1988.

== Track listing ==
1. "Fisiognomica"
2. "E ti vengo a cercare"
3. "Veni l'autunnu"
4. "Secondo imbrunire"
5. "Nomadi"
6. "Zai Saman"
7. "Il mito dell'amore"
8. "L'oceano di silenzio" - (from Fleur Jaeggy's Wasserstatuen)

== Charts ==
=== Weekly charts ===
Weekly chart performance for Fisiognomica
Chart (1988)	Peak position
Italian Albums (Hit Parade)	1

=== Year-end charts ===
Year-end chart performance for Fisiognomica
Chart (1988)	Position
Italian Albums (Hit Parade)	15

== Certifications ==
Region	Certification	Certified units/sales
Spain (Promusicae)	Gold	50,000^{^}
^{^} Shipments figures based on certification alone.
