= Pippo Pollina =

Italian singer-songwriter

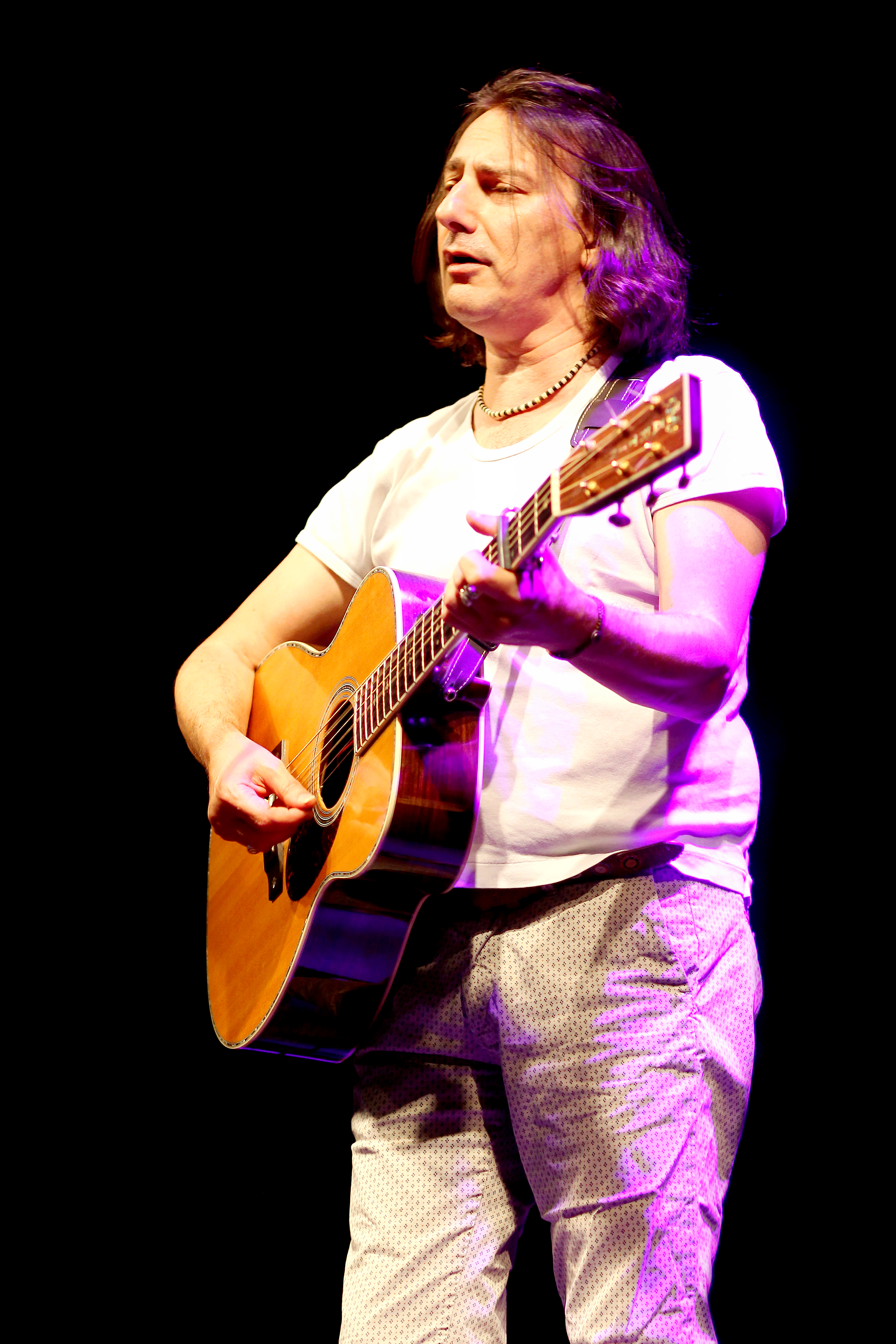
Pippo Polina, Sommertollwood–Festival 2018

Giuseppe "Pippo" Pollina (born 18 May 1963 in Palermo) is an Italian singer-songwriter. He lives in Zurich, Switzerland, and his music is primarily known in German-speaking countries (Germany, Austria and Switzerland). He has had a delayed success in his native country compared to Central Europe.

== Early life ==
Pippo Pollina was born and grew up in Palermo, Sicily, where he studied Law at the University of Palermo. At the same time, he studied classical guitar at the conservatory Amici della musica.

Also, he was engaged in the anti-mafia movement. Being a student, he furthermore worked as a journalist for the monthly journal I Siciliani but quit when the editor in chief, Giuseppe Fava, was murdered by Cosa Nostra.

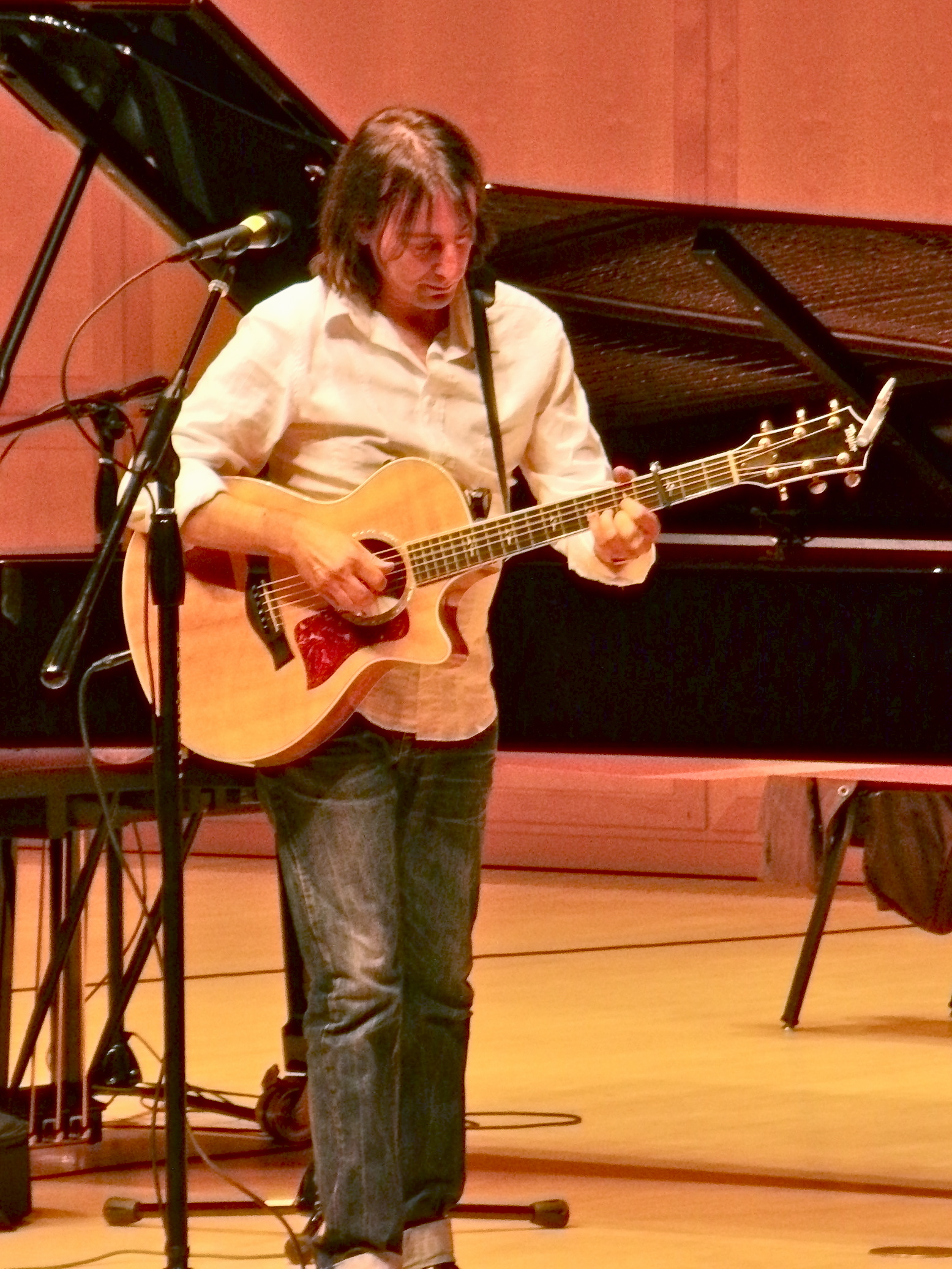
Pippo Pollina

== Career ==
=== Agricantus ===
Together with other musicians from Palermo he founded the group Agricantus. During this collaboration he gained first experience in on-stage performance and concerts in and outside Italy. On top of that, the band held seminars in junior high and high schools addressing topics such as music, history and also mafia.

=== Solo career ===
In late 1985 Pippo Pollina left Italy to start a journey whose destination was not even clear for himself. After three years of traveling the world, the young Sicilian got settled in Switzerland where he was discovered while playing in the streets of Lucerne. He has lived there for more than 20 years. So far, Pippo Pollina has published more than 150 songs on more than 20 albums and gave more than 3000 concerts (solo, duo or with band) in Italy, Switzerland, Austria, Germany, Benelux, France and Egypt. His songs vary in melodic styles and have a high poetic value. The lyrics also include texts in different languages since some of his songs are written in Italian, German, French or Spanish.
Various awards at music contests in Italy and elsewhere are just one indication for the link of his work to the tradition of the Italian canzone d’autore. The presentation of "Ultimo volo" (The last flight) in Italy, Switzerland, and Germany about the Ustica massacre enthused both audience and media. The work is composed of musical and narrative parts and tells the story of an Italian air flight that suffered an in-flight explosion on its way from Bologna to Palermo.
Pippo Pollina is an artist who is in constant creative movement. Several collaborations with other musicians and groups, e.g. Georges Moustaki, Inti Illimani, Franco Battiato, Nada, Charlie Mariano, Konstantin Wecker, Linard Bardill, Patent Orchestra, Ukrainian Symphony Orchestra etc. are emblematic for his career. A recent project, a tour of 15 concerts in Italy together with the Youth Orchestra of the Conservatory of Zurich under the lead of Massimiliano Matesic had its premiere in Zurich, Switzerland. More than 1200 people celebrated the performance which was then staged successfully in Italy in October 2009.
In 2010, Pippo Pollina was on tour in Europe together with an international women’s string quartet (Piccola Orchestra Altamarea). The premiere for this program was on 15 January 2010 in Stuttgart (Germany).
For 2011, two projects were planned in Europe. After a successful tour with the Youth Orchestra of the Conservatory of Zurich, Pippo Pollina performed in six prestigious locations in Switzerland. The Notabene Orchestra of Zurich, again under the lead of Massimiliano Matesic, accompanied the artist during this tour.
A second project in 2011 was a combination of music and text. In addition to his songs, Pippo Pollina read excerpts from a new book about his past 30 years as an artist and, hence, together with his audience look back to the beginning of his career. This tour included more than 250 dates in Austria, Switzerland, Italy and Germany.
Also in 2011, Pippo Pollina gave his debut in the United States in Salt Lake City. In 2012 already he's back on stage in the US.

In 2012 he published "Süden" together with Werner Schmidbauer and Martin Kälberer, a German duo. Süden which means "south" in English was chosen as a metapher that not only relates to the Southern hemisphere but also to the origin of all three musicians, i.e. Sicily (Pollina) and Bavaria (Schmidbauer, Kälberer). It represents the idea of a certain mentality of people that were born in the Southern region of their countries of origin. Songs highlight the problems in the Southern hemisphere, they talk about the South as people's home but also about friendship and hope. Another particularity of this album is the use of different languages (Italian, Bavarian (which is a German dialect)) in the same song. Pollina and his colleagues sing in the foreign language and make this a journey not only between different aspects of the word "south" but also between different languages.

== Discography ==
- 1987 - I Nu Passaran (Collaboration with Linard Bardill)
- 1987 - Aspettando che sia mattino
- 1988 - Participation at a compilation Viva Natira with the song La casa di Armon
- 1989 - Sulle orme del Re Minosse
- 1991 - Nuovi giorni di settembre
- 1993 - Le pietre di Montsegur
- 1995 - Dodici lettere d’amore
- 1997 - Il giorno del falco
- 1998 - Il giorno del falco (Italian edition)
- 1998 - Ken (maxi single)
- 1999 - Finnegan’s Wake (Single + video Finnegan’s Wake)
- 1999 - Rossocuore (Storie di note, SDN 002)
- 2000 - Elementare Watson
- 2001 - Versi per la libertà (Storie di note, SDN 020)
- 2002 - Insieme (with Linard Bardill)
- 2003 - Racconti brevi (Storie di note)
- 2004 - Camminando (anthology) (Storie di note)
- 2005 - Bar Casablanca (Storie di note, SDN 043)
- 2006 - Racconti e canzoni (Storie di note, SDN 057; live CD and DVD)
- 2007 - Ultimo volo (Storie di note, SDN 060; live)
- 2008 - Di nuovo insieme (with Linard Bardill)
- 2008 - Caffè Caflisch
- 2009 - Fra due isole (live)
- 2012 - Süden (with Werner Schmidbauer & Martin Kälberer)
- 2014 - L'appartenenza
- 2014 - Grande Finale
- 2017 - Il Sole Che Verrà

== Awards and honors ==
- Price of the Swiss Television (1989)
- Förderpreis of the City of Zurich (1996)
- Kleinkunstpreis Kupferle, Ravensburg (1996)
- Star of the Year Award of the evening paper Munich (1999)
- Award "Una Casa per Rino", Crotone (2003)
- Among the three best competitors at the music festival in Mantova (2004)
- Price of the Festival of Independent Labels in Faenza (2005)
- Award of the city of Palermo for the role in "Ricordare Anna" (2005)
- Nominated for the small Swiss Art Prize, Thun (2006)
- Award "Premio alla Carriera" at the Festival of Italian author song "Canzone Italiana d' autore" in Munich,(2007)
- Nomination of "Ultimo Volo" for the Stuttgart Peace Prize (2008)
- Prize of the German Record Critics' Award for the CD "Caffè Caflish" (2009)
- Award "Padre Pino Puglisi nel mondo", Palermo (2009)
- Price "Pino Veneziano”, Trapani (2010)
- Prize "Premio Giacosa Colleretto" (2011)
- Prize "Premio" musica e cultura-Peppino Impastato "Cinisi (2011)
- Prize "Premio Lunezia" Marina di Carrara (2011)
- Award “Premio lettarario città di Sciacca” (2012)
- Swiss KleinKunstPreis, Thun (2012)
- Price of the Freiburg Kulturbörse "Freiburger Leiter" (2013)

== Books ==
- Vigne, B. and P. Pollina (1997). Camminando camminando. Besigheim, Faceton Verlag.
- Loeffler, S. (2005). Begegnungen mit Pippo Pollina. Ulm, kawe8 Verlag.
- Vassia, F. (2010). Abitare il sogno - Vita e musica di Pippo Pollina, Stampa Alternativa
