= Roberto Mancinelli (A&R) =

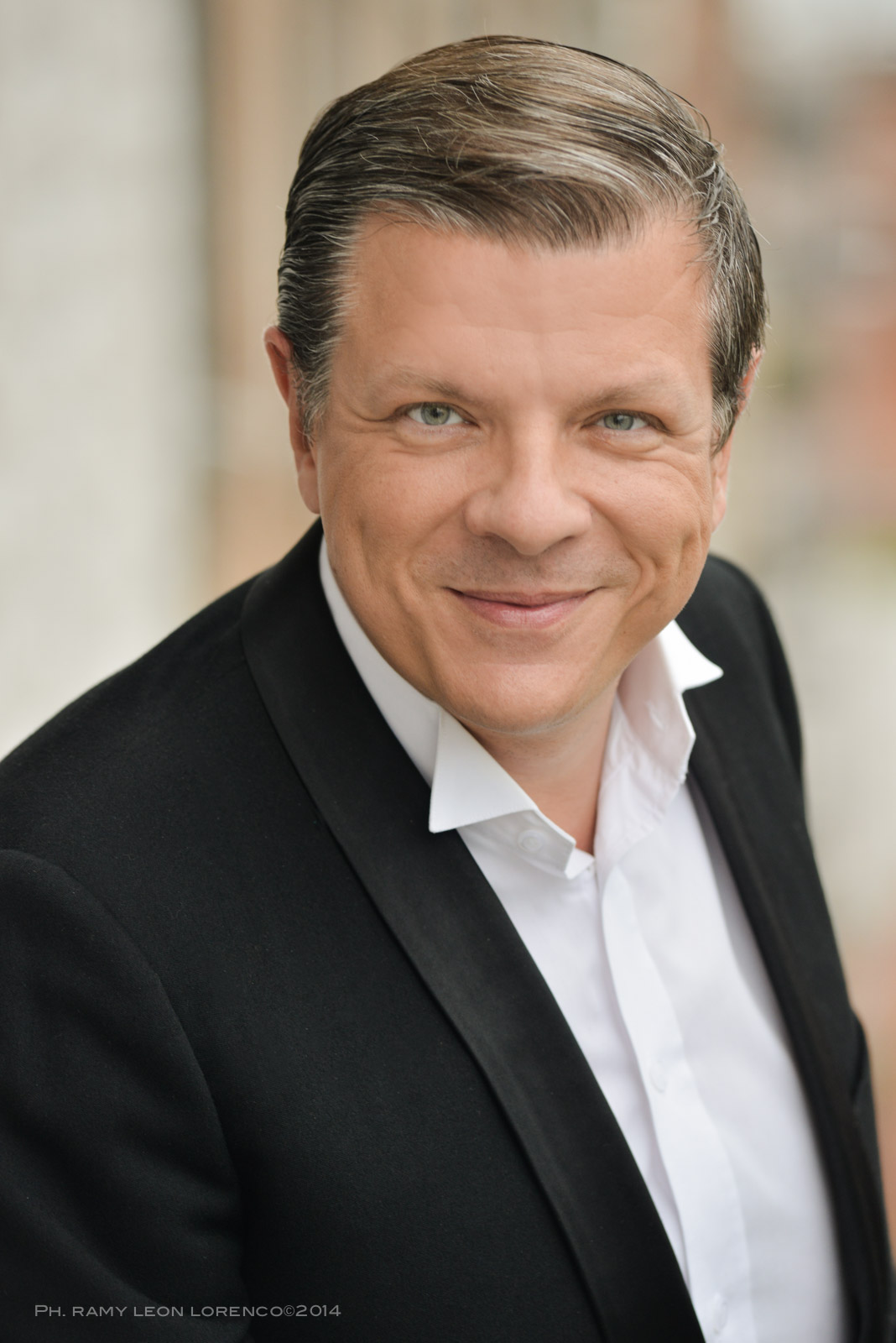
Mancinelli in 2014

Roberto Mancinelli (born 12 June 1970) is an Italian A&R executive, record producer and writer.

Throughout his career, he worked with many Italian artists like Franco Battiato, Gianna Nannini, Vinicio Capossela, Laura Pausini, Irene Grandi, Paolo Conte, Mina, Adriano Celentano, PFM, Nomadi, and Nek.

== Early career ==
Born in Benevento, Mancinelli grew up in Castelvenere. In 1988 he made his radio debut, working at Radio Telesia. A year later he moved to Bologna, where he attended DAMS at the University of Bologna. While a student, he worked as a DJ in some local venues and started collaborating with Punto Radio, Telemontecarlo and Videomusic. In 1991 he became music programming manager at Radio Kiss Kiss and moved to Naples. In 1993 he moved back to Bologna, and the following year he started writing reviews for the music magazine Rockstar.

== A&R executive ==
1995 saw his debut in the recording industry: he started working in the promotion department of Flying Records. In 1996 he became the A&R of CGD. In 2000 he became A&R of S4 Records. In 2002 he founded another label, C&C Progetti Discografici. In 2006, along with Fabio Canino, he wrote Raffabook, dedicated to Italian singer, actress and television presenter Raffaella Carrà. Since 2007 he has been the A&R of Sony/ATV Music Publishing Italy. In the following years he worked with Gianna Nannini, Giovanni Caccamo, Sonohra, Karima, Nek, Virginio. In 2014 he moved to New York City, where he acts as Consultant Italian Portfolio for Sony/Atv. In 2015 he won the prestigious FIM Award.

In 2017 he founded the record label I Mean Music & Management. The first artist produced by the label is the young singer-songwriter Braschi, who took part at the Sanremo Music Festival 2017 in the "Nuove Proposte" section, with the song "Nel Mare Ci Sono I Coccodrilli".

In October 2017 he joined Sugar Music Publishing's team, signing Alessandra Flora – one among the most prominent new songwriters in Italy whose songs appear on Gianni Morandi, Raf, Malika Ayane and Nina Zilli.

== Books ==
- Raffabook (2006)

== Awards ==
- FIM Award (2015)
