= Fleurs 2 =

Studio album by Franco Battiato
- Released: 14 November 2008
- Length: 40:42
- Label: Mercury

Franco Battiato chronology
Il vuoto (2007)	Fleurs 2 (2008)	Inneres Auge (2009)

Fleurs 2 is a studio album by Italian singer-songwriter Franco Battiato, released by Mercury Records in 2008. It is the final chapter in the Fleurs trilogy of cover albums, following Fleurs and Fleurs 3.

== Production ==
As with the previous chapters, the album mostly consists of cover versions, plus two new songs.

Battiato started recording the album on 13 September 2008. It was mostly recorded at Pinaxa Studios in Milan, with piano contributions recorded at Teldex Studio in Berlin and archs recorded at Abbey Road Studios. Among the musicians who collaborated to the album, were the Royal Philharmonic Orchestra, Essiet Essiet, Mylious Johnson, and Aldo Tagliapietra's son Davide.

Several songs were anticipated during two concerts, at La Cigale in Paris and at Koko in London. Cover art was cured by Francesco Messina.

== Release ==
Anticipated by the lead single "Tutto l'universo obbedisce all'amore", the album was released on 14 November 2008. Its iTunes version also include a bonus song, "Tibet", which was later included in the album Inneres Auge.

== Track listing ==
Fleurs 2 track listing
No.	Title	Writer(s)	Length
1.	"Tutto l'universo obbedisce all'amore" (with Carmen Consoli)	Franco Battiato, Manlio Sgalambro	3:28
2.	"Era d'estate"	Sergio Bardotti, Sergio Endrigo	3:04
3.	"E più ti amo"	Alain Barrière, Gino Paoli	3:12
4.	"It's Five O' Clock"	Richard J. Francis, Vangelis	3:00
5.	"Del suo veloce volo" (with Antony)	Antony Hegarty	3:10
6.	"Et Maintenant"	Gilbert Bécaud, Pierre Delanoë	3:33
7.	"(Sittin' On) The Dock of the Bay" (with Anne Ducros)	Otis Redding, Steve Cropper	3:18
8.	"Il carmelo di Echt"	Juri Camisasca	3:23
9.	"Il venait d'avoir 18 ans" (with Sepideh Raissadat)	Pascal Auriat	3:43
10.	"Bridge over Troubled Water"	Paul Simon	3:51
11.	"La musica muore" (with Juri Camisasca)	Juri Camisasca	3:33
12.	"L'addio"	Battiato, Ippolita Avalli, Mino Di Martino	2:25

Fleurs 2 – iTunes bonus track
No.	Title	Writer(s)	Length
13.	"Tibet" (with Chiara Vergati)	Battiato, Sgalambro	3:21

== Charts ==
=== Weekly charts ===
Chart performance for Fleurs 2
Chart (2008–09)	Peak position
Italian Albums (FIMI)	4

=== Year-end charts ===
Year-end chart performance for Fleurs 2
Chart (2008)	Position
Italian Albums (FIMI)	18
Chart (2009)	Position
Italian Albums (FIMI)	34
