= Ferro battuto =

2001 studio album by Franco Battiato

Studio album by Franco Battiato
- Released: 2001
- Length: 44:49
- Label: Sony Records

Franco Battiato chronology
Fleurs (1999)	Ferro battuto (2001)	Fleurs 3 (2002)

Ferro battuto (lit. 'Wrought iron') is the twenty-second studio album by Italian singer-songwriter Franco Battiato, released in 2001.

== Production ==
Battiato started working on the album in August 2000. It was recorded between Battiato's house in Milo, Whitfield Street Studios and Angel Recording Studios in London.

Among the musicians who collaborated to the album, were David Rhodes, Gavyn Wright, and Sonia Jones, while Natacha Atlas and Simple Minds' Jim Kerr were guests in two songs.

The cover art parodies the early 1900s Russian political posters, and was realized by Moltimedia Fattoria Digitale.

== Release and reception ==
The album was released on 13 April 2001. The same year, it was released a Spanish-language version of the album, Hierro forjado.

== Track listing ==
No.	Title	Writer(s)	Length
1.	"Running against the grain"	Franco Battiato, Manlio Sgalambro	3:43
2.	"Bist du bei mir"	Battiato, Sgalambro	4:21
3.	"La quiete dopo un addio"	Battiato, Sgalambro	3:55
4.	"Personalità empirica"	Battiato, Sgalambro	3:37
5.	"Il cammino interminabile"	Battiato, Sgalambro	3:46
6.	"Lontananze d'azzurro"	Battiato, Sgalambro	3:29
7.	"Hey Joe"	William Billy Roberts	3:35
8.	"Sarcofagia"	Battiato, Sgalambro	3:43
9.	"Scherzo in minore"	Django Reinhardt, Stéphane Grappelli, Battiato, Sgalambro	3:23
10.	"Il potere del canto"	Battiato, Sgalambro	11:17

== Charts ==
Chart performance for Ferro battuto
Chart (2001)	Peak position
Italy (FIMI)	2

=== Year-end charts ===
Year-end chart performance for Ferro battuto
Chart (2001)	Position
Italian Albums (FIMI)	35
