= Raniero Mancinelli =

Italian tailor

Raniero Mancinelli is an Italian tailor. He dressed Pope John Paul II, Pope Benedict XVI, and Pope Francis.

== Biography ==
Mancinelli began tailoring when he was fifteen years old, working alongside his father. He has designed cassocks for popes, including John Paul II, Benedict XVI and Francis, for over fifty years. He operates out of a shop in Borgo Pio, near the Vatican City. He also designs clothes for cardinals.

In 2025, he designed three cassocks for the successor of Pope Francis to wear inside the "room of tears", next to the Sistine Chapel, following his election as pope. He was not hired by the Vatican to make the cassocks for the future pope.
