= Pollution (album) =

Studio album by Franco Battiato
- Released: 1973
- Genre: Progressive rock, experimental rock, space rock, psychedelic rock
- Length: 33:09
- Language: Italian
- Label: Bla Bla
- Producer: Franco Battiato

Franco Battiato chronology
Fetus (1972)	Pollution (1973)	Sulle corde di Aries (1973)

Pollution is the second studio album by the Italian progressive rock musician Franco Battiato. It was released in 1973 on the experimental label Bla Bla (catalogue no. BBXL10002). It reached No.19 in the Italian Album charts.

== Track listing ==
1. "Il silenzio del rumore" (2:48)
2. "31 dicembre 1999 - Ore 9" (0:20)
3. "Areknames" (5:07)
4. "Beta" (7:25)
5. "Plancton" (5:03)
6. "Pollution" (8:49)
7. "Ti sei mai chiesto quale funzione hai?" (3:35)

== Personnel ==
- Franco Battiato - vocals, VCS 3 synthesizer
- Ruby Cacciapaglia - piano, VCS 3 and VCS 2 synthesizer
- Gianfranco D'Adda - drums
- Mario Ellepi - guitars, VCS 3 synthesizer, vocals
- Gianni Mocchetti - bass, VCS 3 synthesizer, vocals

== Charts ==
=== Weekly charts ===
Weekly chart performance for Pollution
Chart (1973)	Peak position
Italian Albums (Hit Parade)	19

=== Year-end charts ===
Year-end chart performance for Pollution
Chart (1973)	Position
Italian Albums (Hit Parade)	59
