= Tutto l'universo obbedisce all'amore =

Single by Franco Battiato featuring Carmen Consoli

from the album Fleurs 2
- Released: 2008
- Length: 3:28
- Label: Universal Music Group
- Songwriters: Franco Battiato; Manlio Sgalambro

Franco Battiato singles chronology
| "Il vuoto" (2007) | "Tutto l'universo obbedisce all'amore" (2008) | "Inneres Auge" (2009) |

Carmen Consoli singles chronology
| "Tutto su Eva" (2006) | "Tutto l'universo obbedisce all'amore" (2008) | "Non molto lontano da qui" (2009) |

Music video
- "Tutto l'universo obbedisce all'amore" on YouTube

"Tutto l'universo obbedisce all'amore" (lit. 'The whole universe obeys love') is a 2008 song by Franco Battiato featuring Carmen Consoli. It is the first single from Battiato's album Fleurs 2, and its title comes from Jean de La Fontaine's book The Loves of Cupid and Psyche. The song was arranged in a baroque style, and Battiato described it as a divertimento, which had among its musical inspirations Alessandro Scarlatti.

== Music video ==
A visual music video for the song, directed by Alex Infascelli, was released on YouTube on 12 December 2008.

== Track listing ==
| No. | Title | Writer(s) | Length |
|---|---|---|---|
| 1. | "Tutto l'universo obbedisce all'amore" | Franco Battiato, Manlio Sgalambro | 3:28 |

== Charts ==
Original version
| Chart (2008) | Peak position |
|---|---|
| Italy (FIMI) | 5 |
