= La cura =

Single by Franco Battiato

from the album L'imboscata
- B-side: "Días extraños"
- Released: 1997
- Length: 4:01
- Label: Mercury Records
- Songwriters: Franco Battiato, Manlio Sgalambro

Franco Battiato singles chronology
"Strani giorni" (1996)	"La cura" (1997)	"Di passaggio" (1997)

Music video
- "La cura" on YouTube

"La cura" (lit. 'The cure') is a 1996 song by Franco Battiato, the second single from his album L'imboscata. The song was composed by Battiato following the death of his mother Grazia, and its lyrics have been subjected to various interpretations, meant as a romantic dialogue between two lovers, between a parent and a child, or as an inner reflection on oneself. Battiato described the song as "a prayer in reverse", not made by a man to God but in which it's God who comforts the humanity. The song was awarded song of the year at the Premio italiano della musica.

In 2010, Battiato recorded a new version of the song with Lucio Dalla, Gianni Morandi, Sepideh Raissadat, Florence Donovan, Iskra, and Roberto Ferri for the charity album Ti amo anche se non so chi sei. He also recorded the song in Spanish, with the title "El cuidado". Artists who covered it include Adriano Celentano, Massimo Ranieri, Fiorella Mannoia, Alice, Noemi, Greg Castiglioni, Loredana Errore.

== Track listing ==
- 7" single

No.	Title	Writer(s)	Length
1.	"La cura"	Franco Battiato, Manlio Sgalambro	4:01
2.	"Días extraños (feat. Nicola Walker Smith)"	Battiato, Sgalambro, Benedict Fenner, Milagrosa Ortiz Martín	3:57

== Charts ==
=== Weekly charts ===
Chart (1997)	Peak position
Italy Airplay (Music & Media)	10

Chart (2021)	Peak position
Italy (FIMI)	17

== Certifications ==
Region	Certification	Certified units/sales
Italy (FIMI) sales from 2009	3× Platinum	150,000^{‡}
^{‡} Sales+streaming figures based on certification alone.
