= Roberto Mancinelli (footballer) =

Italian footballer

Personal information
- Date of birth: January 29, 1976 (age 50)
- Place of birth: Albano Laziale, Rome, Italy
- Height: 1.88 m (6 ft 2 in)
- Position: Goalkeeper

Senior career*
Years	Team	Apps	(Gls)
1995–1996	Lazio	0	(0)
1996–1999	Teramo	1	(0)
1999–2002	Castel Di Sangro	58	(0)
2002–2004	Teramo	65	(0)
2004–2007	Cavese	97	(0)
2007–2010	Catanzaro	71	(0)
2010–2011	Sorrento	11	(0)
2011–2013	Benevento	13	(0)

Managerial career
- 2016: Ciampino
- * Club domestic league appearances and goals

Roberto Mancinelli (born 29 January 1976) is an Italian football coach and a former player who played as a goalkeeper.

In July 2011 he was signed by Benevento in 1-year contract.
