= Lost Love (2003 film) =

- Theatrical release poster
- Directed by: Franco Battiato
- Written by: Franco Battiato; Manlio Sgalambro
- Starring: Corrado Fortuna; Donatella Finocchiaro; Anna Maria Gherardi; Lucia Sardo; Ninni Bruschetta; Manlio Sgalambro; Gabriele Ferzetti; Nicole Grimaudo; Rada Rassimov; Luca Vitrano
- Cinematography: Marco Pontecorvo
- Edited by: Isabelle Proust
- Production companies: L'Ottava; Sidecar
- Distributed by: Warner Bros. Italia
- Release date: 16 May 2003
- Country: Italy
- Language: Italian

Lost Love (Italian: Perdutoamor, also spelled Perduto amor) is a 2003 Italian autobiographical drama film. It marked the directorial debut of singer-songwriter Franco Battiato. For this film Battiato won the Nastro d'Argento for best new director.

== Cast ==
- Corrado Fortuna as Ettore
- Donatella Finocchiaro as Mary
- Anna Maria Gherardi as Augusta
- Lucia Sardo as Nerina
- Ninni Bruschetta as Luigi
- Tiziana Lodato as "La Vivace"
- Gabriele Ferzetti as Tommaso Pasini
- Nicole Grimaudo as Raffaella
- Rada Rassimov as Clara Pasini
- Luca Vitrano as Ettore as a child
- Manlio Sgalambro as Martino Alliata
- Elisabetta Sgarbi as Elisabetta Gaia
- Francesco De Gregori as Francesco D

== See also ==
List of Italian films of 2003
