= Fetus (album) =

Studio album by Franco Battiato
- Released: 1972
- Genre: Progressive rock
- Length: 30:40
- Label: Bla Bla
- Producer: Pino Massara

Franco Battiato chronology
Fetus (1972)	Pollution (1973)

Fetus is the debut studio album by Italian singer-songwriter Franco Battiato, released in 1972. A concept album, it tells the metaphysical development of an embryo into a human being, from conception to birth.

== Production ==
Battiato got inspiration for the album from Aldous Huxley's books Brave New World and Brave New World Revisited, and from the RAI documentary series Destinazione uomo ('Destination human'). Recording started at the REGson studios (later Officine Meccaniche) in Milan in November 1971. Battiato was supported by Gianni Mocchetti's band Cristalli Fragili, with the EMS VCS 3 synthesizer playing a major role in music composition and arrangements.

The shocking cover art, featuring a real fetus, was ideated by Gianni Sassi and photographed by Fabio Simion. The internal cover features Niki de Saint Phalle's sculpture installation Hon – en katedral ('She-a-Cathedral'), depicting a pregnant woman lying on her back with her legs spread and a gate in place of her vagina.

The album was composed by Battiato with Sassi, Sergio Albergoni and producer Pino Massara, and they were all credited under the pseudonym Frankenstein. The opening song "Energia" features a fragment of David Vorhaus' composition "Canon". The title song "Fetus" opens with a heartbeat, an effect later used by Pink Floyd in The Dark Side of the Moon.

== Release ==
The album was released in January 1972. The fetus on the cover proved to be extremely controversial, leading many record shops to refuse to sell the album. An English-version of the album titled Foetus was produced by Island Records, but remained unreleased until 1999, when it was published on CD by Vynil Magic.

== Reception ==
At the time of its release, Fetus sold about 7,000 copies. The album has been described as "pure experimentation", "a melodic vocal in a fabric of meditative electronic sounds". Battiato's colleague Eugenio Finardi referred to the album as "really innovative, different and shocking". Fabio Zuffanti wrote: "With unusual sounds and a general hallucinatory feeling, [the album is] a work of mysterious and elusive fascination". Former Il Mucchio Selvaggio music critic Andrea Scanzi described Fetus and the following Battiato's album Pollution as "somewhere between art music and krautrock, drenched in psychedelia and science fiction themes".

== Track listing ==
All tracks are written by Frankenstein [Sassi, Albergoni, Battiato, Massara].

Fetus track listing
No.	Title	Length
1.	"Energia"	4:31
2.	"Fetus"	2:39
3.	"Una cellula"	2:55
4.	"Cariocinesi"	1:59
5.	"Fenomenologia"	3:51
6.	"Meccanica"	6:11
7.	"Anafase"	5:36
8.	"Mutazione"	2:58
