= Virginio =

Virginio is a given name, and may refer to:

- Virginio Cáceres (born 1962), Paraguayan footballer
- Virginio Colombo (1885–1927), Italian architect
- Virginio Ferrari (born 1952), Italian motorcycle racer
- Virginio Ferrari (artist) (21st century), Italian sculptor
- Virginio Livraghi (21st century), Italian comic strip artist and illustrator
- Virginio Orsini (circa 1434 – 1497), Italian condottiero
- Virginio Orsini (cardinal) (1615–1676), Italian cardinal
- Virginio Rognoni (1924–2022), Italian politician
- Virginio Rosetta (1902–1975), Italian former football player
- Virginio Vespignani (1808–1882), Italian architect

== See also ==
- Virginia (disambiguation)
