= Inneres Auge =

Studio album by Franco Battiato
- Released: 13 November 2009
- Length: 32:49
- Label: Universal Music Group

Franco Battiato chronology
Fleurs 2 (2007)	Inneres Auge (2009)	Apriti sesamo (2012)

Inneres Auge (German for 'Inner eye'), also known with the long title Inneres Auge - Il tutto è più della somma delle sue parti (lit. 'The whole is more than the sum of its parts'), is a studio album by Italian singer-songwriter Franco Battiato, released by Universal Music Group in 2009. It mostly consists of new versions of old songs.

== Production ==
When his label requested a live album, Battiato opted instead to rearrange and re-record some old songs that, as he put it, "did not received the resonance they deserved". In addition to them, there are two new songs (the title track and "U cuntu"), a cover version of a Fabrizio De André song ("Inverno"), and the song "Tibet", originally published as bonus track for the iTunes version of Fleurs 2.

Battiato recorded the album at Pinaxa Studios in Milan. Cover art was cured by Francesco Messina.

== Release ==
Anticipated by the lead single "Inneres Auge", the album was released on 13 November 2009.

== Track listing ==
Inneres Auge track listing
No.	Title	Lyrics	Music	Length
1.	"Inneres Auge"	Franco Battiato, Manlio Sgalambro	Battiato	3:44
2.	"Un'altra vita"	Battiato, Giusto Pio	Battiato, Pio	3:10
3.	"Inverno"	Fabrizio De André	De André, Gian Piero Reverberi	3:29
4.	"No Time No Space"	Saro Cosentino, Battiato	Battiato, Pio	3:14
5.	"L'incantesimo"	Sgalambro	Battiato	3:20
6.	"Haiku"	Battiato	Battiato	2:37
7.	"La quiete dopo un addio"	Battiato, Sgalambro	Battiato	3:24
8.	"Stage Door"	Battiato, Sgalambro	Battiato	3:40
9.	"Tibet"	Battiato, Sgalambro	Battiato	3:19
10.	"'U cuntu"	Battiato, Sgalambro	Battiato	2:52

== Charts ==
=== Weekly charts ===
Chart performance for Inneres Auge
Chart (2009–10)	Peak position
Italian Albums (FIMI)	5

=== Year-end charts ===
Year-end chart performance for Inneres Auge
Chart (2009)	Position
Italian Albums (FIMI)	43
