= Dieci stratagemmi =

Studio album by Franco Battiato
- Released: 1 October 2004
- Recorded: 2004
- Genre: Pop rock, electronic music, progressive rock
- Length: 35:17
- Label: Sony Music
- Producer: Franco Battiato

Franco Battiato chronology
Last Summer Dance (2003)	Dieci stratagemmi (2004)	Un soffio al cuore di natura elettrica (2005)

Singles from Dieci stratagemmi
- 1. "Tra sesso e castità" Released: 2004; 2. "Le aquile non volano a stormi" Released: 2004; 3. "Ermeneutica" Released: 2004; 4. "Odore di polvere da sparo" Released: 2004

Dieci stratagemmi (transl. Ten stratagems) is an album by Franco Battiato. It was released in fall of 2004 by Sony Music, and features musicians like the Krisma and Lacuna Coil's female singer Cristina Scabbia.

Battiato came up with the idea of this album after reading the book Thirty-Six Stratagems, an ancient Chinese tactic and strategy military book.

== Track listing ==
1. "Tra sesso e castità" - 3:26
2. "Le aquile non volano a stormi" - 3:27
3. "Ermeneutica" - 3:34
4. "Fortezza Bastiani" - 3:21
5. "Odore di polvere da sparo" - 3:29
6. "I'm That" - 3:33
7. "Conforto alla vita" - 3:23
8. "23 coppie di cromosomi" - 3:35
9. "Apparenza e realtà" - 3:39
10. "La porta dello spavento supremo"; "La porta dello spavento supremo, il sogno" - 3:50

== Charts ==
=== Weekly charts ===
Weekly chart performance for Dieci stratagemmi
Chart (2004)	Peak position
Italian Albums (FIMI)	1

=== Year-end charts ===
Year-end chart performance for Dieci stratagemmi
Chart (2004)	Position
Italian Albums (FIMI)	31
