= Juri Camisasca =

Italian composer

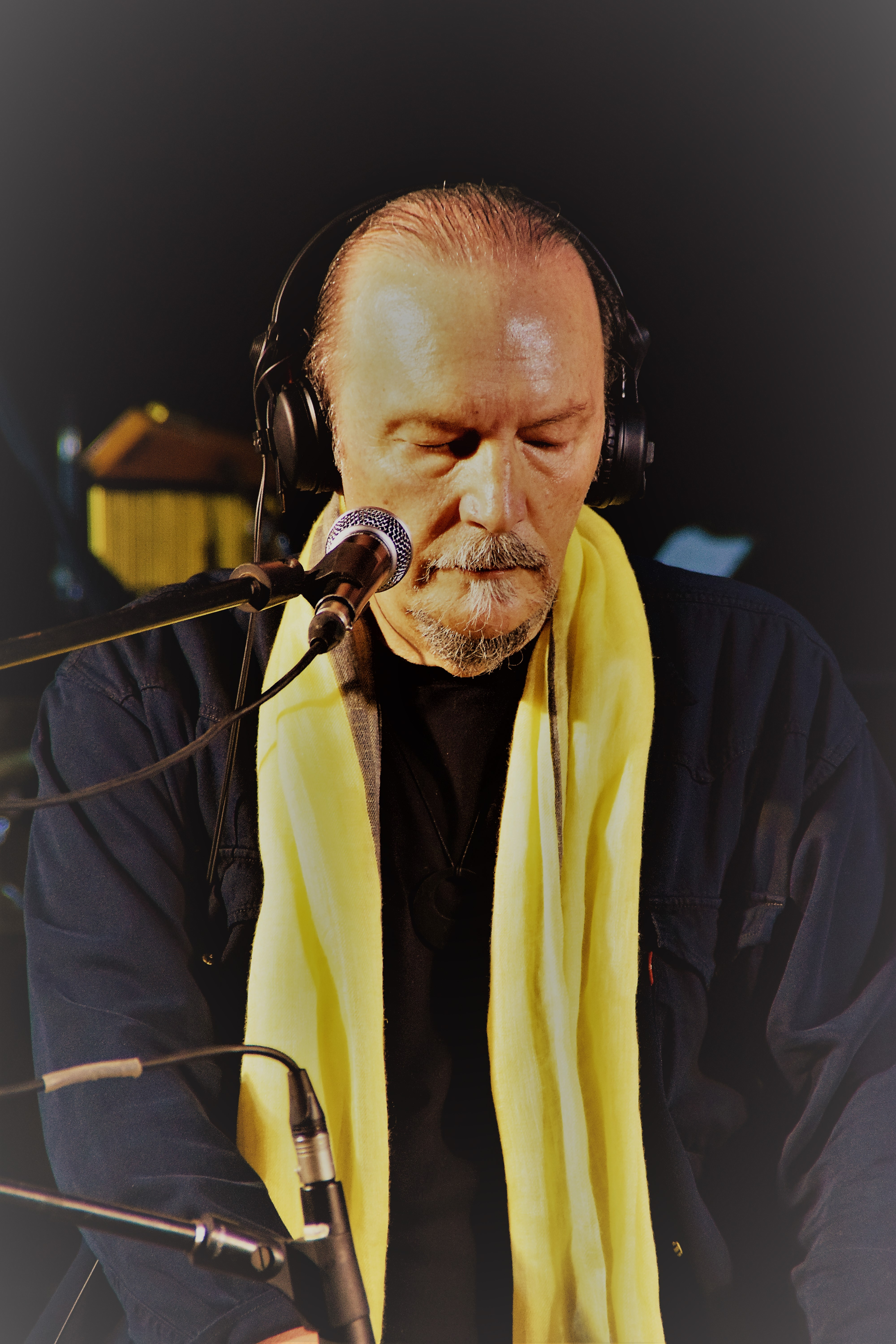
- Camisasca in 2017
- Born: Roberto Camisasca; 9 August 1951 (age 75); Melegnano, Milan, Italy
- Occupation: Singer-songwriter

Roberto Camisasca (born 9 August 1951), best known as Juri Camisasca, is an Italian singer-songwriter and composer.

== Life and career ==
Born in Melegnano, a self-taught musician, Camisasca debuted in 1974 with the progressive rock album La finestra dentro, produced by Pino Massara and Franco Battiato, which received large critical acclaim. In the following years he collaborated as a vocalist and as a songwriter with Battiato and with other singers, and he took part in the musical project Telaio Magnetico.

In 1979 Camisasca decided to enter a Benedictine monastery, still keeping active as a songwriter for artists such as Milva, Alice and Giuni Russo. In 1987 he left the monastic life to embrace an eremitical life at the slopes of Mount Etna. After participating in the Battiato's opera Genesi as a singer and as the narrating voice, he reprised his record activity in 1988 with the album Te Deum.

Camisasca is also active as an icon painter, an activity he gradually focused on in later years.

== Discography ==
Album

- 1974 – La finestra dentro (Bla Bla, BBXL 10005)
- 1988 – Te Deum (EMI, 66 791529 1)
- 1991 – Il carmelo di Echt (EMI, 66 797202 1)
- 1999 – Arcano Enigma (Mercury, 546 082–2)
- 2016 – Spirituality (Warner Music, in couple with Rosario Di Bella)
- 2019 – Laudes (Paoline, 8019118024619)
