= Fleur Jaeggy =

Swiss writer (born 1940)

- Born: 31 July 1940 (age 86); Zurich, Switzerland
- Occupations: Writer, translator
- Spouse: Roberto Calasso (m. 1968; died 2021)
- Writing career
- Pen name: Carlotta Wieck
- Language: Italian
- Period: 1968–present
- Genres: Novel, short story
- Notable awards: Viareggio Prize 2002

Fleur Jaeggy (born 31 July 1940) is a Swiss author who writes in Italian. The Times Literary Supplement named her novel Proleterka a Best Book of the Year upon its publication in the United States, and her Sweet Days of Discipline won the Premio Bagutta and the Premio Speciale Rapallo. She was awarded the 2024 Gottfried Keller Prize and the 2025 Swiss Grand Prix de la Littérature. As of 2021, six of her books have been translated into English. Her work has been translated into more than twenty languages.

== Life ==
Jaeggy was born in Zürich in 1940, and grew up speaking German, French and Italian. After completing her studies in Switzerland, she went to live in Rome, where she met Ingeborg Bachmann and Thomas Bernhard. In 1968, she went to Milan to work for the publisher Adelphi Edizioni and married Roberto Calasso. The Times Literary Supplement designated her novel Proleterka the best book of 2003. She is also a translator into Italian of Marcel Schwob and Thomas De Quincey.

Her 1989 novel Sweet Days of Discipline won the Premio Bagutta as well as the Premio Speciale Rapallo. It was published in English, translated by Tim Parks.

In 2021, New Directions published Jaeggy's 1980 The Water Statues in English, translated by Gini Alhadeff. The book is dedicated to Jaeggy's friend, Austrian writer Ingeborg Bachmann. Jaeggy's work has been translated into more than twenty languages. She won the 2024 Gottfried Keller Prize and the 2025 Swiss Grand Prix de la Littérature.

Jaeggy worked with the Italian musician Franco Battiato under the pseudonym of Carlotta Wieck.

== Selected bibliography ==
=== Fiction ===
- Il dito in bocca (Adelphi, 1968). OCLC 604490511
- L'angelo custode (Adelphi, 1971).
- Le statue d'acqua (Adelphi, 1980). The Water Statues, trans. Gini Alhadeff (New Directions, 2021).
- I beati anni del castigo (Adelphi, 1989). Sweet Days of Discipline, trans. Tim Parks (Heinemann/New Directions, 1993; And Other Stories, 2018; ISBN 978-0-8112-2903-6).
- La paura del cielo (Adelphi, 1994). Last Vanities, trans. Tim Parks (New Directions, 1998; ISBN 978-0-8112-1374-5).
- Proleterka (Adelphi, 2001). S. S. Proleterka, trans. Alastair McEwen (New Directions, 2003; And Other Stories, 2019; ISBN 978-1-911508-56-4).
- Vite congetturali (Adelphi, 2009). These Possible Lives, trans. Minna Zallman Proctor (New Directions, 2017; ISBN 978-0-8112-2687-5).
- Sono il fratello di XX (Adelphi, 2014). I Am the Brother of XX, trans. Gini Alhadeff (New Directions/And Other Stories, 2017; ISBN 978-1-911508-02-1).

=== Translations into Italian ===
- Marcel Schwob, Vite immaginarie (Adelphi, 1972).
- Thomas de Quincey, Gli ultimi giorni di Immanuel Kant (Adelphi, 1983).
