= Franco Battiato =

Italian musician (1945–2021)

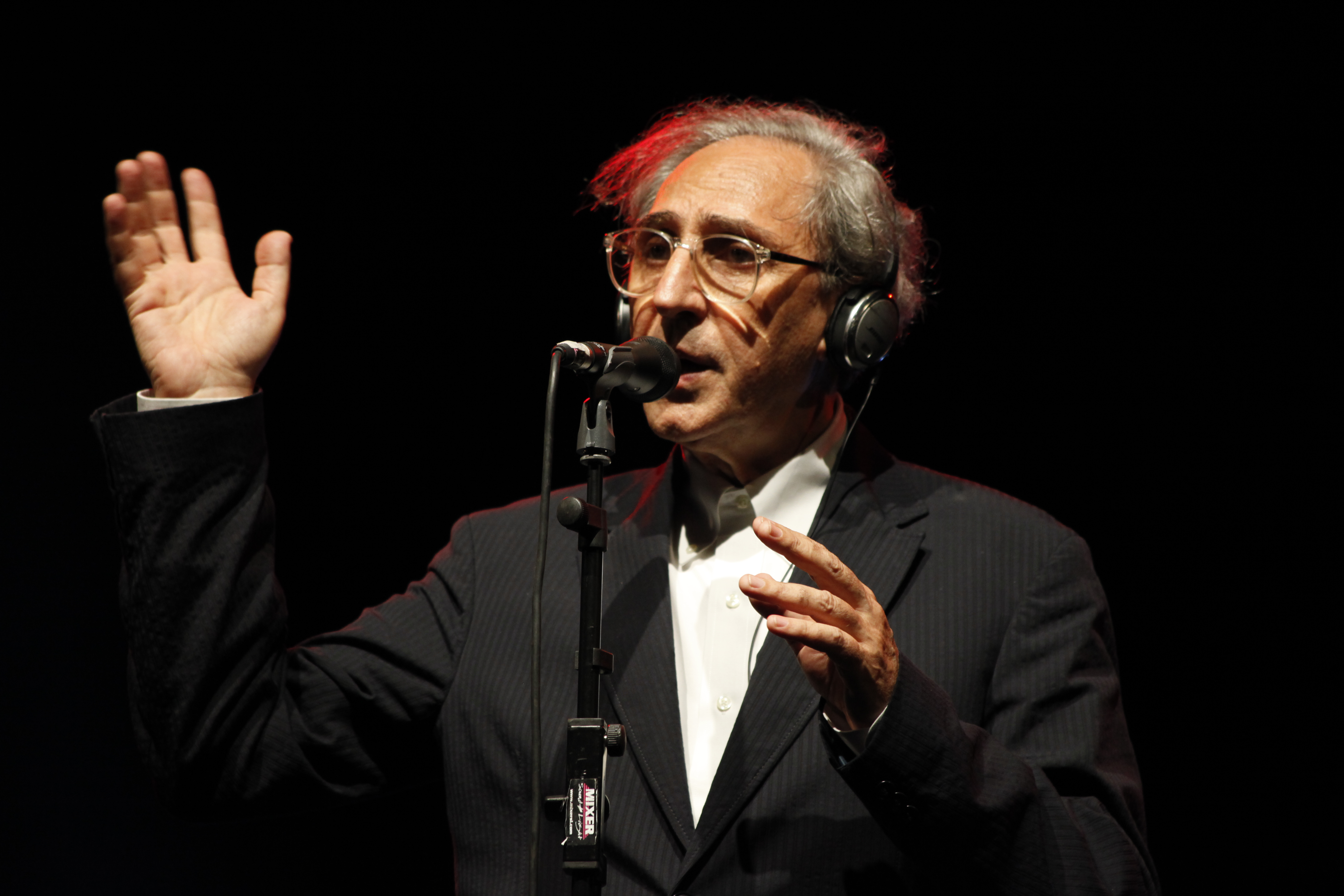
- Battiato at the Festival Gaber in Viareggio, 2010

Background information
- Also known as: Süphan Barzani
- Born: Francesco Battiato; 23 March 1945; Ionia, Sicily, Kingdom of Italy
- Died: 18 May 2021 (aged 76) Milo, Sicily, Italy
- Genres: Beat; new wave; experimental; musique concrète; progressive pop; electropop; pop; new-age; opera; free jazz; progressive rock; psychedelic
- Occupations: Musician; singer; composer; filmmaker; painter
- Instruments: Vocals; piano; guitar; pianoforte; organ; violin; synthesizer; harpsichord; mellotron
- Years active: 1965–2019
- Labels: Ricordi; EMI; Sony Music
- Website: www.battiato.it

Francesco "Franco" Battiato (Italian: [ˈfraŋko batˈtjaːto, - battiˈaːto]; 23 March 1945 – 18 May 2021) was an Italian musician, singer, composer, filmmaker and, under the pseudonym Süphan Barzani, (Note: Combining Mount Süphan in Turkish Kurdistan with the surname Barzani, borne by several Kurdish political leaders.) also a painter. Battiato's songs explore many themes (including, but not limited to, philosophy, art, spirituality, science, introspection, innovation, esotericism, religiousness), and have spanned genres such as experimental pop, electronic music, minimalism, avant-garde, progressive rock, new wave, symphonic music, sound collage, opera, oratorio and movie soundtrack.

He was for decades one of the most popular singer-songwriters in Italy. His unique sound, song-crafting and especially his lyrics (often containing philosophical, intellectual and culturally exotic references, as well as tackling universal themes about the human condition) earned him a unique spot on Italy's music scene, and the nickname of "Il Maestro". His work includes songwriting and joint production efforts with several Italian and international musicians and pop singers, including the long-lasting professional relationship with Italian singers Alice and Giuni Russo. Together with Alice, Battiato represented Italy at the Eurovision Song Contest 1984 with the song "I treni di Tozeur".

== Biography ==
=== Early years and experimental period ===
Battiato was born in Ionia, the former name of the town of Giarre-Riposto, in Sicily, southern Italy. After graduating from high school at the Liceo Scientifico "Archimede" in Acireale, and following the death of his father (truck driver and longshoreman in New York), in 1964 he moved first to Rome, and then to Milan at age 19, and soon after won his first musical contract.

His single "La Torre" was released and Battiato appeared on TV to perform the song. He scored some success with the romantic song "È l'amore". After some works as a guitarist and sound engineer for popular singers, he traveled to America for a small tour where he had considerable success. After that, Battiato met the experimental musician Juri Camisasca in 1970 and collaborated with Osage Tribe, an Italian psychedelic-progressive rock band. As a solo artist, he released the science-fiction single La convenzione (The convention), one of the finest Italian progressive rock songs of the 1970s.

Starting from 1971, Battiato devoted much of his efforts to experimental electronic music, producing a series of LPs that remained almost unknown at the time, but are now eagerly sought by collectors worldwide. Starting out with electronic progressive rock with some emphasis on vocals, his music became increasingly experimental, gradually moving into the realms of musique concrète and minimalism. Fetus, his first album, was released in January 1972, followed by Pollution (1973), Sulle Corde di Aries (1973), Clic (1974) and M.elle le "Gladiator" (1975).

In 1975, he moved to the Dischi Ricordi label, producing Battiato (1977), Juke Box (1978) and the experimental it:L'Egitto prima delle sabbie ("Egypt Before the Sands", 1978), which won the Stockhausen award for contemporary music. Battiato's early research about sound represented an important innovation as the basis of the THX and Stereophonic Sound.

=== National success ===
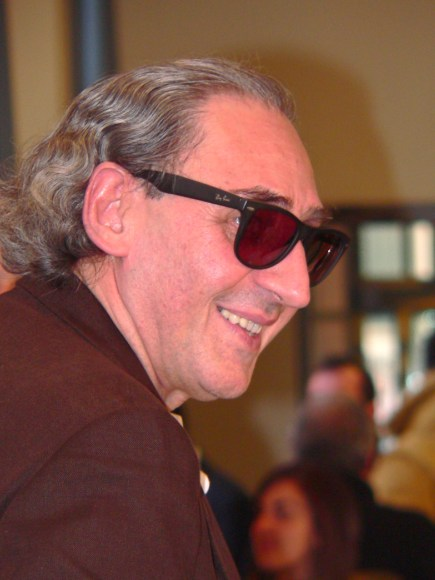
Battiato in 2005

After the Ricordi label failed to re-sign him, Battiato signed with EMI. He abandoned the progressive rock experiments of the previous years and moved to a more pop-oriented style which afforded him ever increasing popularity with both Italian and worldwide audiences. In this period his albums were usually in collaboration with the renowned musician and violinist Giusto Pio, whose two later albums were produced by Battiato.

L'era del cinghiale bianco ("The Era of the White Boar", 1979) was followed in 1980 by Patriots, which reached the No 30 on the charts. It contains a few songs which have become Battiato's classics, such as "Le aquile" ("The Eagles") and "Prospettiva Nevskij" ("Nevsky Prospect"). This new era of his music marked the beginning of his collaboration with the singer Alice and the violinist Giusto Pio. His next album was La voce del padrone ("The Master's Voice"), with which he had even more success than with Patriots. The album contains numerous songs which became classics of Italian popular music and stayed at the number one position for six months, becoming the first Italian album with more than one million copies sold in a single month. His commercial success was confirmed by L'arca di Noè (Noah's Ark) in 1982. Songs such as "L'era del cinghiale bianco" (1979), "Prospettiva Nevskij" (1980), "Centro di gravità permanente" ("Permanent Gravity Centrepoint", 1981), "Bandiera bianca" ("White Flag", 1981), and "Voglio vederti danzare" ("I Want To See You Dance", 1982) established his reputation in his own country. Orizzonti perduti (Lost Horizons, 1983) was followed by the successful Mondi Lontanissimi (Faraway Worlds, 1985), which featured a solo version of the popular "I treni di Tozeur" ("The Tozeur Trains)", originally a duet with Alice performed at the Eurovision Song Contest 1984.

1988's Fisiognomica (Physiognomy) sold more than 300,000 copies and it confirmed Battiato's success. The album, considered by Battiato himself his best work for the balance between music and lyrics, contained the hit "Nomadi" ("Nomads"), originally recorded by Alice and written by his old friend Juri Camisasca, who in the meantime had retired to a Benedictine monastery. The album also included the songs "E ti vengo a cercare", which was performed by director/actor Nanni Moretti in his 1989 movie Palombella Rossa, and "Veni l'autunnu" with lyrics entirely in the Sicilian and Arabic languages.

In 2013 he signed a publishing deal with Roberto Mancinelli and Sony/ATV Music Publishing.

=== Collaboration with Manlio Sgalambro ===
In 1994 Battiato began to collaborate with the Sicilian philosopher Manlio Sgalambro, who was to write almost all the lyrics of his following albums. After the tentative L'ombrello e la macchina da cucire of 1995, in 1996 the duo published what is considered their best work so far, L'imboscata, containing the romantic hit "La cura" ("The care"), elected best Italian song of the year. Gommalacca (1998, with a stress on hard rock), Ferro battuto (2000) and Dieci stratagemmi (2004) continued on the same path, with variations mainly set by Battiato's unceasing desire for musical experimentation.

=== Later acts ===
In 2003 Battiato released his first feature film, Lost Love (Perduto amor), for which he also composed the soundtrack. The movie won the Silver Ribbon for the best debutant director and was screened, out of competition as a Battiato request, with excellent critics in prestigious film festivals like Berlin, Cannes, Venezia, New York among others. His following movie was, Musikanten, an experimental work about Beethoven's last four years of life. The German musician was played by the Chilean director Alejandro Jodorowsky. In November 2012, Battiato accepted an offer from newly elected Sicilian regional president Rosario Crocetta to become the regional Minister for Tourism and Culture, announcing he would not receive any salary for his position, but subsequently had to resign after a controversial statement in which he defined Sicily's corrupt political elite as "prostitutes".

=== Final years ===
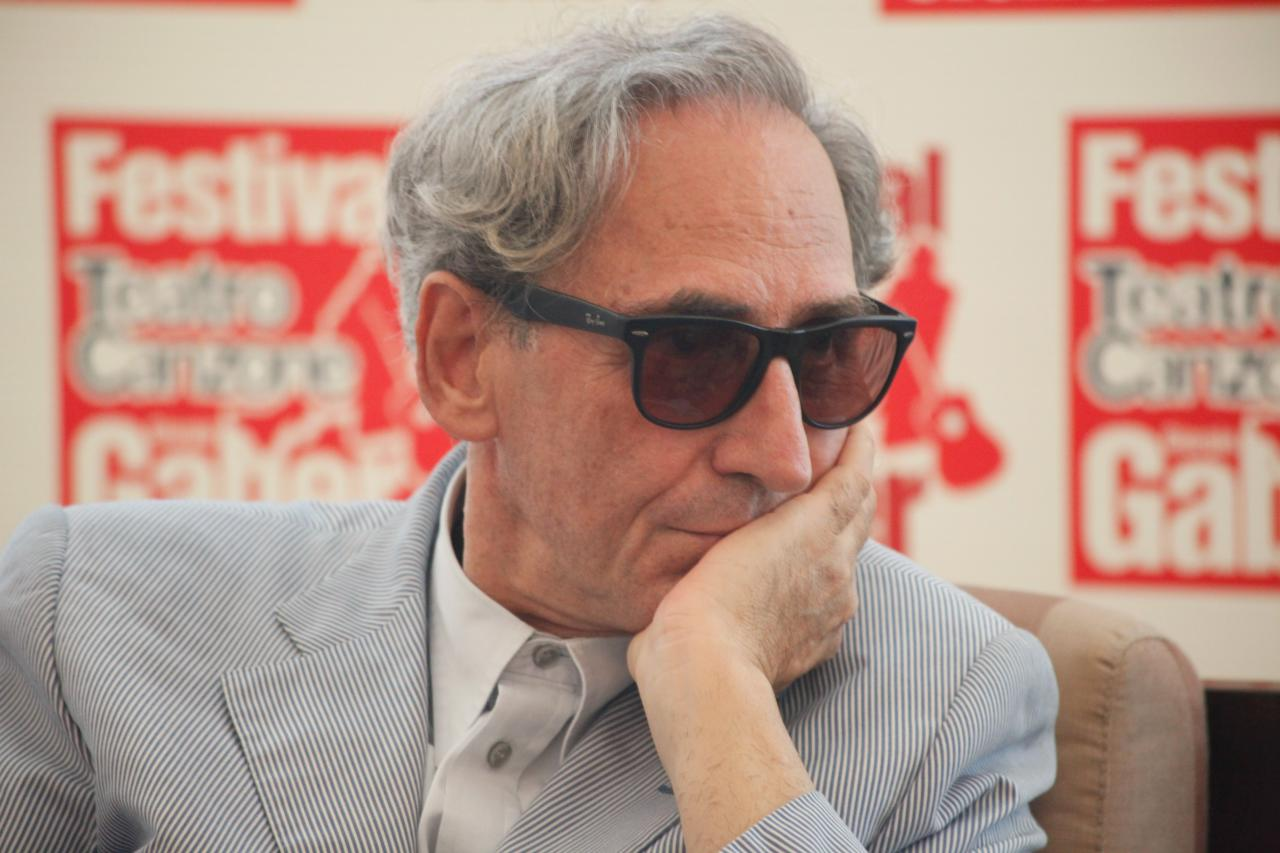
Battiato in 2010

In the 2010s he issued Fleurs, Fleurs 3, and Fleurs 2, one after the other, in that specific order. They included covers of songs originally recorded by very famous Italian singers and singers-songwriters, as well as covers of French and English songs, plus three new songs. He went on releasing his music, always on a thin border between pop, rock and electronics, until 2010. He toured with Alice for the whole of 2016, but in 2017 he held his last concert in Catania. He would have continued his work, but he had to give up for health reasons. At the end of 2019, his manager announced his definitive retirement from the scene.

Battiato was vegetarian and was a follower of the ideas of pluralism and ecumenism.

Battiato died on 18 May 2021, at his home in Milo, Catania, surrounded by rumours about a neurodegenerative disease, osteoporosis or cancer. The real cause of death remains as a secret in order to respect Battiato's last request and family petition. The following year it was revealed that the artist had been suffering of multiple myeloma for years, diagnosed in 2017.

== Discography ==
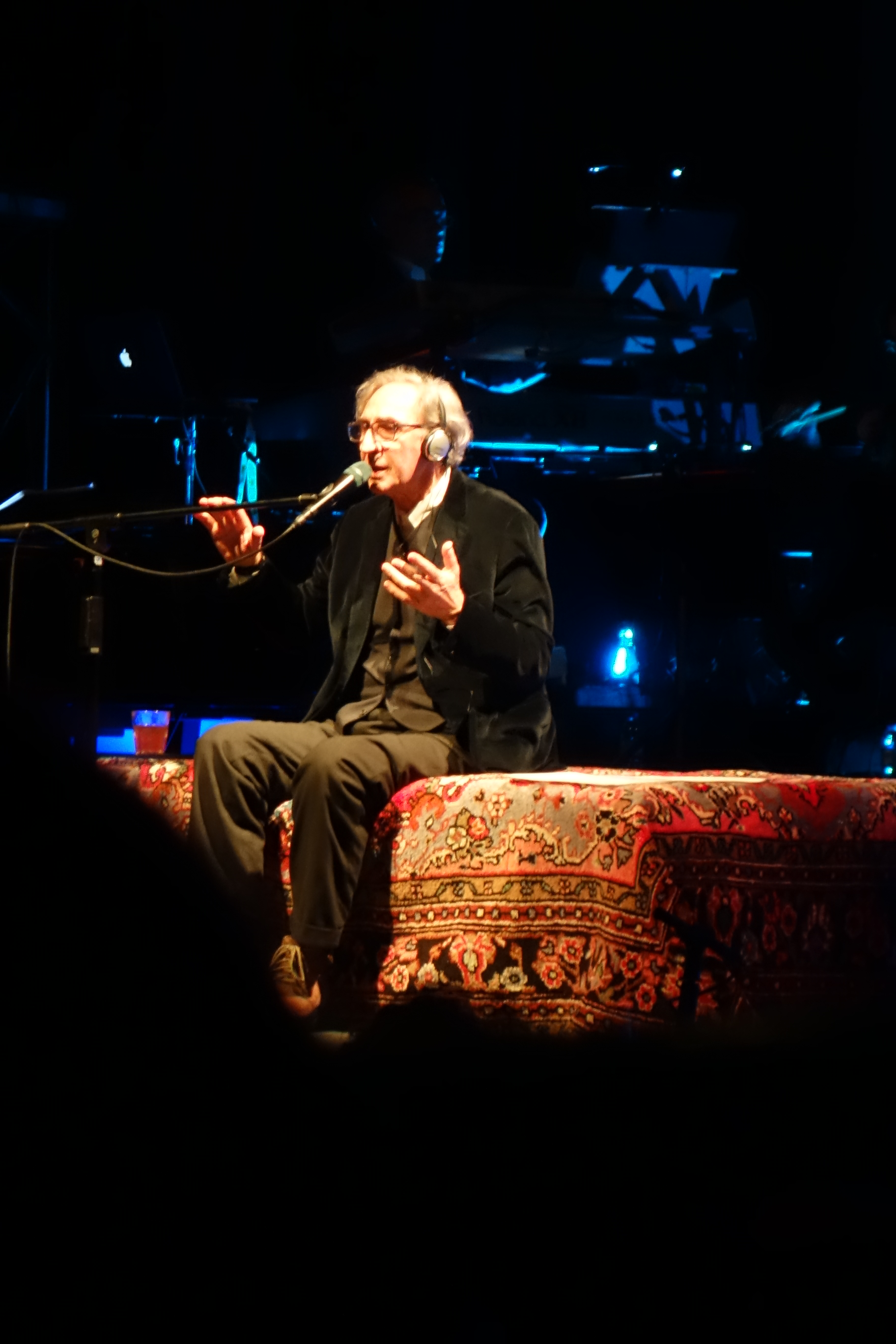
Franco Battiato in concert in Teatro Circo Price, Madrid 2013

Year	Title	Sales	Certifications
1970	Fetus	ITA: 7,000	
1973	Pollution		
1973	Sulle corde di Aries		
1974	Clic		
1975	M.elle le Gladiator		
1976	Feed Back (collection)		
1977	Battiato		
1977	Juke Box		
1978	L'Egitto prima delle sabbie		
1979	L'era del cinghiale bianco	ITA: 9,000	
1980	Patriots	ITA: 40,000	
1981	La voce del padrone	ITA: 1,000,000	AFI: Platinum; FIMI: Platinum
1982	L'arca di Noè	ITA: 550,000	
1983	Orizzonti perduti	ITA: 400,000	
1985	Mondi lontanissimi		
1985	Echoes of Sufi Dances (in English)		
1985	Ecos de danzas sufi (in Spanish)		PROMUSICAE: Gold
1986	Battiato (collection)		
1987	Nomadas		PROMUSICAE: Platinum
1988	Fisiognomica	ITA: 300,000	PROMUSICAE: Gold
1989	Giubbe rosse (live)		
1990	Una vita scellerata (soundtrack)		
1991	Come un cammello in una grondaia		
1993	Caffè de la Paix		
1994	Unprotected	ITA: 100,000	
1996	Battiato Studio Collection		FIMI: Gold
1996	L'ombrello e la macchina da cucire		
1996	L'imboscata	ITA: 140,000	
1998	Gommalacca	ITA: 200,000	
1999	Fleurs	ITA: 400,000	
2000	La cura		FIMI: Gold
2000	Campi magnetici (soundtrack)		
2001	Ferro battuto		
2002	Fleurs 3		FIMI: Gold
2003	Last Summer Dance (live)		
2004	Platinum Collection		FIMI: Gold
2004	Dieci stratagemmi		
2005	Un soffio al cuore di natura elettrica (live)		
2008	Fleurs 2	ITA: 120,000	
2009	Inneres Auge		FIMI: Gold
2012	Apriti sesamo		FIMI: Gold
2013	Del suo veloce volo – with Antony and the Johnsons (live)		FIMI: Gold
2014	Joe Patti's Experimental Group		
2015	Le nostre anime (compilation)		FIMI: Gold
2016	Live in Roma – with Alice (live)		
2019	Torneremo ancora		

=== Singles ===
- 1965: "L'amore è partito" (Love's gone) – as Francesco Battiato
- 1965: "E più ti amo" (The more I love you...) – as Francesco Battiato
- 1967: "La torre / Le reazioni" (The tower / The reaction)
- 1967: "Triste come me / Il mondo va così" (Sad like me / The world goes like this)
- 1968: "È l'amore / Fumo di una sigaretta" (It's love / Smoke of a cigarette)
- 1969: "Bella ragazza / Occhi d'or" (Beautiful girl / Golden eyes)
- 1969: "Sembrava una serata come tante / Gente" (It seemed it was an ordinary evening / People)
- 1971: "Vento caldo / Marciapiede" (Warm wind / Pavement) – recorded 1968
- 1972: "Energia / Una cellula" (Energy / A cell)
- 1972: "La convenzione / Paranoia" (The convention / ...)
- 1973: "Love / Soldier" – as Springfield
- 1978: "Adieu / San Marco" – as Astra
- 1979: "L'era del cinghiale bianco / Luna indiana" (The era of the white boar / Indian moon)
- 1981: "Bandiera bianca / Summer on a Solitary Beach" (White flag / ...)
- 1984: "I treni di Tozeur / Le biciclette di Forlì" (The trains of Tozeur / The bicycles of Forlì) – with Alice
- 1985: "No Time No Space / Il re del mondo" (... / The king of the world)
- 1985: "Via Lattea / L'animale" (Milky Way / The animal)
- 1996: "Strani giorni" (Strange days)
- 1996: "Strani giorni" (Remix)
- 1997: "La cura" (The cure)
- 1997: "Di passaggio" (Passing by)
- 1998: "Shock in My Town"
- 1998: "Il ballo del potere" (The Dance of Power)
- 2001: "Running Against the Grain"
- 2007: "Il vuoto" (The emptiness)
- 2007: "Il vuoto" (Stylophonic Remix)
- 2008: "Tutto l'universo obbedisce all'amore" (The entire universe obeys love)
- 2009: "Inneres Auge"
- 2012: "Passacaglia"
- 2013: "Del suo veloce volo" (Of its rapid flight) – with Antony and the Johnsons

== Operas ==
- Genesi (1987)
- Gilgamesh (1992)
- Messa arcaica (1994)
- Il cavaliere dell'intelletto (1994) – unreleased
- Telesio (2011)

== Filmography ==
- Lost Love (2003)
- Musikanten (2005)
- Nothing is as it seems (2007)
- La sua figura (2007)
- Auguri Don Gesualdo (2010)
- Attraversando il Bardo (2014)

== Bibliography ==
- Tecnica mista su tappeto, Conversazioni autobiografiche (1992)
- Evoluzione evoluzione evoluzione (1998)
- Parole e canzoni (2004)
- In fondo sono contento di aver fatto la mia conoscenza (2007)
- Musica e spiritualità (2008)
- Io chi sono? Dialoghi sulla musica e sullo spirito (2009)
- Temporary Road. (una) Vita di Franco Battiato. Dialogo con Giuseppe Pollicelli (2018)

== Notes ==
Awards and achievements
Preceded by Riccardo Fogli with "Per Lucia"	Italy in the Eurovision Song Contest; 1984	Succeeded by Al Bano & Romina Power with "Magic Oh Magic"
