= Fonoprint =

Recording studio

Fonoprint is a recording studio located in Bologna, Italy, founded in 1976. The owner is Leopoldo Cavalli, while the sound engineers are Maurizio Biancani, Enrico Capalbo, Claudio Adamo, and Pietro Giolito. The facility is certified for Dolby Atmos Music.

== Albums recorded and mixed at the studio ==
- Vasco Rossi
  - ...Ma cosa vuoi che sia una canzone... (1978)
  - Non siamo mica gli americani (1979)
  - Siamo solo noi (1981)
  - Vado Al Massimo (1982)
  - Bollicine (1983)
  - Fronte del palco (1990)
  - Vasco London Instant Live 04.05.2010 (2010)
- Claudio Lolli
  - Extranei (1980)
  - Ho visto anche degli zingari felici (2003)
- Change
  - Miracles (1981)
- Pooh
  - Non siamo in pericolo/Anni senza fiato (1982)
  - Tropico del Nord (1983)
- Luca Carboni
  - ...intanto Dustin Hoffman non sbaglia un film (1984)
  - Forever (1985)
  - Luca Carboni (1987)
  - Luca Carboni (1989)
  - L'avvenire (1990)
  - LU*CA (2001)
  - Live (2003)
  - Senza Titolo (2011)
- Marcella Bella
  - Nell'Aria (1983)
- Miguel Bosé
  - Salamandra (1986)
- Zucchero
  - Blue's (1987)
  - All the Best (2007)
  - Live in Italy (2008)
- Eros Ramazzotti
  - In certi momenti (1987)
  - Musica è (1988)
  - In ogni senso (1990)
  - Tutte Storie (1993)
  - Dove c'è musica (1996)
  - Eros (Eros Ramazzotti album) (1997)
  - 9 (2003)
- Lucio Dalla
  - 1983 (1983)
  - Viaggi Organizzati (1984)
  - DallAmeriCaruso (1986)
  - Henna (1993)
- Lucio Dalla/Gianni Morandi
  - Dalla/Morandi (1988)
- Milva
  - Uomini addosso (1993)
- Sangue Misto
  - SXM (1994)
- Franco Battiato
  - Giubbe Rosse (1989, live)
  - Messa Arcaica (1993)
  - L'ombrello e la macchina da cucire (1995)
- Francesco Guccini
- 1996 – D'amore di morte e di altre sciocchezze
- 1998 – Guccini Live Collection (live)
- 2000 – Stagioni
- 2004 – Ritratti
- 2005 – Anfiteatro Live (live)
- 2006 – The Platinum Collection
- 2010 – Storia di altre storie
- 2012 – L'ultima Thule
- Giorgia
  - Come Thelma & Louise (1995)
  - Strano il mio destino (Live & studio 95/96) (1996)
- Claudio Baglioni
  - Viaggiatore sulla coda del tempo (1999)
- Skiantos
  - Doppia dose (1999)
- Mango
  - Dove vai (1995)
  - Visto così (1999)
- Laura Pausini
  - Tra te e il mare (2000)
  - La solitudine e inoltre anche The Best of Laura Pausini: E ritorno da te (2001)
  - Io canto (2006)
  - Primavera in anticipo (2008)
- Carmen Consoli
  - Stato di necessità (2000)
- Sting
  - ...All This Time (2001)
- Angelo Branduardi
  - Futuro antico III (2002)
  - Futuro antico IV (2007)
- Luciano Ligabue
  - Fuori come va? (2002)
  - Giro d'Italia (2003)
  - Il mio pensiero e Ho ancora la forza (2008)
- Alice
  - Viaggio in Italia (2003)
- Ivano Fossati
  - Lampo viaggiatore (2003)
- Federico Poggipollini
  - Bologna e Piove (2003)
- Francesco Renga
  - Orchestraevoce (2008)
- Noemi
  - Vuoto a perdere (2011)
- Il Volo
  - L'amore Si Muove (2015)
- Matia Bazar
  - Melanchólia (1985)
- Peter Jacques Band
  - Fire Night Dance (1979)
  - Welcome Back (1980)
- Lùnapop
  - ...Squérez? (1999)
- Cube
  - Can Can In The Garden (1983)

== See also ==
- Mauro Malavasi, arranger, producer
- Roberto Costa: bassist
