= Stagioni =

Studio album by Francesco Guccini
- Released: 4 February 2000
- Genre: Italian singer-songwriter
- Length: 42:18
- Label: EMI

Francesco Guccini chronology
Guccini Live Collection (1998)	Stagioni (2000)	Francesco Guccini Live @ RTSI (2001)

Stagioni is the nineteenth album by Italian singer-songwriter Francesco Guccini. The title means seasons, and three of the songs of the album are named after a season. It was released in 2000 by EMI, and was at the top of the Italian album chart for one week.

== Overview ==
Stagioni ("seasons") was released on February 4, 2000, four years after Guccini's last studio album, D'amore di morte e di altre sciocchezze. It consists of nine songs, three of which were named after a season: "Autunno" (autumn), "Primavera '59" (spring '59) and Inverno '60 (winter '60). "Ho ancora la forza" was written and sang together with Luciano Ligabue, another singer-songwriter from Emilia-Romagna; it received the 2000 Targa Tenco best song award. The title track was about the death of Ernesto "Che" Guevara, a figure Guccini sang about also in his next album, Ritratti. Guccini said the first attempt at writing it was in 1968, but he stopped at half a verse; he was encouraged in finishing the song by the good reception those few lines received at one of his concerts. "Addio" was a bitter song, attacking the "horizon full of dwarfs and dancers"; it was seen by some as akin to "L'avvelenata", one of his most famous songs. In "Don Chisciotte" Guccini was the voice of Don Quixote, in a duet with Juan Carlos Biondini as Sancho Panza. The song "E un giorno..." was dedicated to his daughter, the second one after "Culodritto" (from his 1987 album Signora Bovary).

== Reception ==
Stagioni received mixed reviews by critics. Mario Luzzatto Fegiz, in his review on the Corriere della Sera, said it was "Guccini DOC, with the final and melancholic tones of a testament", while an article on La Repubblica said "Guccini doesn't surrender, he still has the strength of becoming indignant". The website Ondarock gave Stagioni a 5.5 mark, saying there was more care in the formal feature but less spontaneity than in Guccini's former albums. The website rockol.it slated the album, saying it was "obvious, embarrassing, pathetic, redundant".

The album was a commercial success, reaching the top spot in the Italian album chart in its release week, and remaining in the chart for 13 weeks.

== Track listing ==
1. "Addio (intro)" - 0:53
2. "Stagioni" - 6:08
3. "Autunno" - 4:55
4. "E un giorno..." - 5:25
5. "Ho ancora la forza" - 3:24
6. "Inverno '60" - 5:17
7. "Don Chisciotte" - 6:00
8. "Primavera '59" - 5:59
9. "Addio" - 4:10

== Personnel ==
- Vince Tempera - piano, keyboards
- Antonio Marangolo - saxophone, percussion
- Roberto Manuzzi - accordion, saxophone, keyboards
- Ares Tavolazzi - bass guitar, double bass
- Ellade Bandini - drums
- Juan Carlos Biondini - guitar, vocals (in "Don Chisciotte")
- Jimmy Villotti - guitar (in "Inverno '60")
- Henghel Gualdi - clarinet (in "Inverno '60)
