= Signora Bovary =

Studio album by Francesco Guccini
- Released: 1987
- Genre: Italian singer-songwriters
- Length: 38 min.
- Label: EMI

Francesco Guccini chronology
Guccini (1983)	Signora Bovary (1987)	...quasi come Dumas... (1988)

Signora Bovary is an album of Italian singer-songwriter Francesco Guccini. It was released in 1987 by EMI.

== The album ==
"Signora Bovary" is a poetic variation of Gustave Flaubert's 1857 novel Madame Bovary. "Culodritto" is dedicated to Guccini's daughter, Teresa, who was 9 at the time. "Van Loon" is about Guccini's father, who was a reader of the books of the 1930s science writer Hendrik Willem van Loon. The long suite "Keaton" was co-written by Claudio Lolli, who had found difficulties in releasing it: as Guccini liked it, he published in his new album after minor modification. The last stanzas deals with the American actor Buster Keaton.

== Personnel ==
- Francesco Guccini - voice and guitar
- Juan Carlos "Flaco" Biondini - guitars
- Ares Tavolazzi - bass
- Ellade Bandini - drums
- Vince Tempera - piano, keyboards
- Antonio Marangolo - saxophone
- Juan José Mosalini - bandoneon

== Track listing ==
- "Scirocco" (5:40)
- "Signora Bovary" (4:36)
- "Van Loon" (5:44)
- "Culodritto" (2:39)
- "Keaton" (10:12)
- "Le piogge d'aprile" (3:51)
- "Canzone di notte N°3" (5:20)
