= Parnassius Guccinii =

Studio album by Francesco Guccini
- Released: 1993
- Genre: Italian singer-songwriter
- Length: 45:10
- Label: EMI

Francesco Guccini chronology
Quello che non... (1990)	Parnassius Guccinii (1993)	D'amore di morte e di altre sciocchezze (1996)

Parnassius Guccinii is the sixteenth album by Italian singer-songwriter Francesco Guccini. The title references a butterfly subspecies named after the artist. It was released in 1993 by EMI and was generally well received.

== Overview ==
Parnassius Guccinii was released in 1993, three years after Guccini's last studio album, Quello che non.... The title is a reference to a butterfly subspecies discovered in 1992 by an Italian entomologist, which was named Parnassius mnemosyne guccinii after the singer-songwriter. The front cover also features an image of the butterfly. "Canzone per Silvia" was dedicated to activist Silvia Baraldini, while "Nostra signora dell'ipocrisia" (Our lady of hypocrisy) was a criticism of Silvio Berlusconi. The track "Farewell" was inspired by and a reference to "Farewell Angelina" by Bob Dylan, quoting one line ("the triangle tingles, and the trumpet plays slow") and featuring the same instrumental introduction. The song was dedicated to Angela, following the ending of their relationship.

== Reception ==
Parnassius Guccinii was generally well received by critics and won the 1994 award Targa Tenco as best album. The newspaper La Repubblica said it was "beautiful", while an article on the Corriere della Sera said Guccini in the album was "sincere and hot-tempered" and "at times even funny". The Italian music website Ondarock.com gave a 6 mark to the album, saying Guccini was "inspired", and praising "Farewell" as one of the best songs he ever wrote. The literary critic Paolo Jachia stated: "Guccini's enormous poetic and cultural effort has been opening the best tradition of Italian poetry to Dylan-esque ballads".

== Track listing ==
1. "Canzone per Silvia" - 5:04
2. "Acque" - 6:40
3. "Samantha" - 5:22
4. "Farewell" - 5:16
5. "Nostra signora dell'ipocrisia" - 4:23
6. "Dovevo fare del cinema" - 4:28 (music and lyrics by Gian Piero Alloisio)
7. "Non bisognerebbe" - 3:52
8. "Luna fortuna" - 3:51 (music by Juan Carlos Biondini)
9. "Parole" - 6:12

== Personnel ==
- Vince Tempera - piano, keyboards, Hammond organ
- Antonio Marangolo - saxophone
- Roberto Manuzzi - saxophone, harmonica
- Ares Tavolazzi - bass guitar, double bass
- Juan Carlos Biondini - guitar, backing vocals in "Luna fortuna"
- Ellade Bandini - drums, percussion
- Gianni Coscia - accordion
- Lele Chiodi - backing vocals in "Acque"
- Lucio Fabbri - violin
