= Quello che non... =

Studio album by Francesco Guccini
- Released: 1990
- Genre: Italian singer-songwriter
- Length: 44:21
- Label: EMI

Francesco Guccini chronology
...quasi come Dumas... (1988)	Quello che non... (1990)	Parnassius Guccinii (1993)

Quello che non... is the fifteenth album by Italian singer-songwriter Francesco Guccini. It was released in 1990 by EMI.

== Overview ==
Quello che non... was released in 1990 by EMI, three years after Guccini's last studio album, Signora Bovary, continuing on the same style. The main themes of the album are memory and nostalgia, along with a sense of disappointment and indecision. The title means "What I don't...", and an article on newspaper La Repubblica said that for Guccini, in chaotic times, it's easier to say what he doesn't want to be than to describe his wishes. The song "Æmilia" was written along with Lucio Dalla, and had already been released in the 1988 album Dalla/Morandi by Dalla and Gianni Morandi.

== Reception ==
The album was generally well received by critics. Allmusic said it had been "much praised", while the website Ondarock said it was maybe the most musically refined album of Guccini's career. The song "Canzone delle domande consuete" received the 1990 Targa Tenco for the best song.

== Track listing ==
1. "Quello che non..." - 4:26
2. "Canzone delle domande consuete" - 3:29
3. "Canzone per Anna" - 7:14
4. "Ballando con una sconosciuta" - 6:33
5. "Le ragazze della notte" - 5:15
6. "Tango per due" - 5:25
7. "Cencio" - 7:17
8. "Æmilia" - 4:25

== Personnel ==
- Vince Tempera - piano, keyboards
- Ellade Bandini - percussion
- Juan Carlos Biondini - guitar
- Ares Tavolazzi - bass guitar, double bass
- Roberto Manuzzi - harmonica, saxophone
- Roberto Marchiò - violin
