= Radici (album) =

Studio album by Francesco Guccini
- Released: 1972
- Genre: Italian singer-songwriters
- Length: 40:44
- Label: EMI
- Producer: Pier Farri

Francesco Guccini chronology
L'isola non trovata (1970)	Radici (1972)	Opera buffa (1973)

Radici is an album by Italian singer-songwriter Francesco Guccini. It was released in 1972 by EMI.

== The album ==
Radici ("Roots") deals mainly with Guccini's rediscover of his roots, as symbolized by the cover's picture, portraying his grandparents and family. This includes personal roots, but also cultural and political roots.

The opening song, "Radici", is about Guccini's family's house in Pavana, on the Tuscan Apennines.

"La locomotiva" (The locomotive) tells the story a failed suicide attack by a 19th-century Bolognese anarchist against a luxury train; the latter song has since then ended many Guccini shows.

"Piccola città" (Small town) is about Guccini's youth in Modena, where his parents had moved after World War II.

Incontro" (Encounter) deals with the melancholy of a late rendez-vous between Guccini and an old friend.

"Canzone dei dodici mesi" (Song of the twelve months) is about his cultural roots. In particular it is about the various periods of the year which is something extremely important for the small farmer villages in the country.

"Canzone della bambina portoghese" (The song of the Portuguese girl) is about how we think we understand the reality about us but we never get the essence of things.

"Il vecchio e il bambino" (The old man and the child), the last track, is one of the most famous Guccini's ballads. It is about a dialog between a child born after an hypothetical atomic disaster and an old man who tries to describe the world how it was before.

== Personnel ==
- Francesco Guccini - voice and guitar
- Ares Tavolazzi - bass
- Ellade Bandini - drums
- Vince Tempera - piano, keyboards
- Deborah Kooperman - flute, guitars, banjo
- Maurizio Vandelli - mellotron, moog

== Track listing ==
1. "Radici" (7:12)
2. "La locomotiva" (8:17)
3. "Piccola città" (4:38)
4. "Incontro" (3:37)
5. "Canzone dei dodici mesi" (5:33)
6. "Canzone della bambina portoghese" (7:03)
7. "Il vecchio e il bambino" (4:19)
