= Maria Devigili =

- Born: Trento, Trentino-Alto Adige, Italy
- Genres: Indie; rock; instrumental rock; blues
- Occupations: Vocalist; songwriter; musician; producer; recording engineer; videomaker
- Instruments: Vocals; guitar; bass; keyboards
- Years active: 2009–present
- Labels: Riff Records; Gulliver Productions; Cardio Productions; Earth Hertz Records
- Website: www.facebook.com/mariadevigiliofficiale

Maria Devigili is an Italian guitarist, singer-songwriter, videomaker, and musician from Trento.

== Early career ==
In early September 2010, Maria Devigili won the national contest for young songwriters, Premio Pavanello. The prize was the production of an EP with the label Gulliver Studio Production, which became her first official record release, the 20 November 2011 La Semplicità.

In early 2012 Maria Devigili bought her first electric guitar; before that she had played only classical or acoustic guitars. With her new electric sound, she recorded her first album Motori e Introspezioni in June 2012, at the Igloo Audio Factory in Correggio, during the days of the Northern Italian Earthquakes. The album contains a cover of Franco Battiato's "Aria di Rivoluzione", and a musical adaption of the poem "L'Albatros" by Charles Baudelaire.

The album was recorded and arranged by Andrea Sologni, and was released in the autumn of 2012 with the digital distribution by The Orchard and Audioglobe.

== La Trasformazione ==
During the summer of 2014, Devigili launched an online fundraising campaign for the production of her second album La Trasformazione, via the digital platform Music Raiser. The campaign was successful, and she recorded the album in autumn the same year at the Studio Spaziale in Bologna. The album was released in March 2015 on the indie label Riff Records, with the distribution partner Good Fellas and the publisher Buzz Supreme. The album features songwriters Claudio Lolli, and Francesca Bono of the indie rock band Ofeliadorme. The promotional launch of Devigili's second album was managed by the Fleisch press agency.

In April 2015 Maria entered the contest Bologna Palco Aperto, which commemorates Roberto Antoni, leader of the band Skiantos. She won the first prize, an opportunity to play at the Workers' Day Festival on 1 May in Piazza Maggiore in Bologna. There she met guitarist and producer Giuvazza, with whom she began a collaboration.

Their first works together emerged after some months, with the production of the song "Inconsapevoli", on which Giuvazza did the artistic production. They submitted the song to the Sanremo Giovani singing competition, but it was not selected. Giuvazza was also the artistic producer of several further of Devigili's tracks, which were included on her third album Tempus Fugit.

In autumn 2015 Italian music fanzine Rockit included Devigili in a list of the 10 most interesting Italian female indie singer-songwriters.

== Later career ==
On 5 June 2020 Maria Devigili released a single, "Io, tu e le cose", about the menstrual cycle. She composed the song during January 2019 for a female music initiative named "il Festivalino di Anatomia Femminile" (the "Little Festival of Female Anatomy"), created by the Italian journalist and music critic Michele Monina. Leading up to the festival, Monina asked Devigili and a group of other indie female songwriters to compose a song about the female body, as part of a project to be presented in February 2019 during the Sanremo Music Festival.

== Other work ==
From February 2021 to June 2022, Devigili hosted Ecce Cantautrice, a radio show focusing on Italian female singer-songwriters. The program was broadcast on Radio Tandem, a Bolzano radio station known for its association with the struggles for civil rights, feminism and bilingualism.

Since 2011, Devigili has created the music for the theatrical reading "Un Viale da Mezzanotte all'Una" by Pietro Laino, with actress Annalisa Morsella.

== Discography ==
=== Albums ===
- 2011 - "La Semplicità" EP (Gulliver Productions)
- 2012 - Motori e Introspezioni (Audioglobe)
- 2015 - La Trasformazione (Riff Records / Goodfellas)
- 2018 - Tempus Fugit (Riff Records / Cardio Productions)

=== Singles ===
- 2020 - "Io, tu e le cose" (Self-produced)
- 2021 - "Marte" (Riff Records)
- 2021 - "La Rivoluzione Indolore" (Cardio Productions)
- 2022 - "Volare" (Las Palmas Records)
- 2026 - "Comunicare" (Riff Records)
