= L'isola non trovata =

Studio album by Francesco Guccini
- Released: 1970
- Genre: Italian singer-songwriters
- Length: 39:26
- Label: EMI
- Producer: Pier Farri, Vince Tempera

Francesco Guccini chronology
Due anni dopo (1970)	L'isola non trovata (1970)	Radici (1972)

L'isola non trovata is an album of Italian singer-songwriter Francesco Guccini. It was released in December 1970 by EMI, under the nickname "Francesco".

== Personnel ==
- Francesco Guccini - voice and guitar
- Ares Tavolazzi - bass
- Ellade Bandini - drums
- Vince Tempera - piano, keyboards
- Deborah Kooperman - folk guitar
- Franco Mussida - guitars
- Victor Sogliani - voice

== Track listing ==
1. "L'isola non trovata" (2:43)
2. "L'orizzonte di K.D." (3:00)
3. "La collina" (3:40)
4. "Il frate" (5:00)
5. "Un altro giorno è andato" (4:11)
6. "Canzone di notte" (5:04)
7. "Il tema" (4:19)
8. "L'uomo" (5:23)
9. "Asia" (5:12)
10. "L'isola non trovata" (0:54)
