= Auschwitz (song) =

Single by Equipe 84

from the album Io ho in mente te
- A-side: "Bang bang"
- Released: 1966
- Genre: Folk
- Label: Dischi Ricordi
- Songwriter: Francesco Guccini

Equipe 84 singles chronology
"Io ho in mente te" (1966)	"Auschwitz" (1966)	"29 settembre" (1967)

Audio
- "Auschwitz" on YouTube

"Auschwitz" is a song composed by Francesco Guccini, and originally performed by Equipe 84. It was first released as the B-side of a cover of Sonny & Cher's "Bang Bang (My Baby Shot Me Down)", and later included in Equipe 84's album Io ho in mente te. Although the song was written by Guccini it was credited to Lunero and Maurizio Vandelli as the author at the time was not a member of the SIAE.

The following year the song was later recorded by Francesco Guccini and included in his debut album Folk beat n. 1, with the title "La canzone del bambino nel vento (Auschwitz)" ('The song of the child in the wind').

Guccini's authorship of the song was first acknowledged only in 1967, and officially recognized after a 30-year-long trial.

== Inspiration and content ==
"Auschwitz" was the first Italian song about the Holocaust. Guccini was inspired to compose the song after reading Edward Russell's essay The Scourge of the swastika: A Short History of Nazi War Crimes (translated into Italian in 1955) and the autobiographical novel by Vincenzo Pappalettera Tu passerai per il camino where Pappalettera recounted his memoirs about his imprisonment in the Mauthausen concentration camp. The song includes several citations of Bob Dylan's "Blowin' in the Wind".

The lyrics are narrated by two voices: the protagonist, a child who in the Auschwitz concentration camp "died with another hundred, passed through a chimney and is now in the wind", and the author, who poses some rhetorical questions to which there are no answers.

== Track listing ==
- 7" single – SRL 10-438
1. "Bang bang" (Sonny Bono – Alessandro Colombini and Miki Del Prete) – 2:25
2. "Auschwitz" (F. Guccini) – 3:47

== Notable covers ==
- 1992: Nomadi (album Ma che film la vita)
- 1994: Rod MacDonald, English version with the title "Auschwitz (Bambino nel Vento)" (album Man on the Ledge)
- 1997: Gian Pieretti (album Caro Bob Dylan...)
- 2003: Alice (album Viaggio in Italia)
- 2005: Modena City Ramblers (album Appunti partigiani)
- 2013: 7grani (album Neve diventeremo)
- 2017: Vittorio De Scalzi and Mauro Pagani (album Fra la via Aurelia e il West)
- 2019: Elisa (album Note di viaggio N. 1)
