= Io vagabondo =

1972 song

"Io vagabondo" is an Italian song by the Italian band Nomadi, released in 1972.

There is a Spanish version titled "Yo vagabundo"; it was recorded in 1973 but it was published on CD only in 2003.

== Track listing ==
No.	Title	Writer(s)	Length
1.	"Io vagabondo (che non sono altro)"	Alberto Salerno, Damiano Dattoli	3:07
2.	"Eterno"	Beppe Carletti, Carlo Alberto Contini	2:29

== Charts ==
Chart	Peak position
Italy (Musica e dischi)	1

== Certifications ==
Region	Certification	Certified units/sales
Italy (FIMI) Sales from 2009	Platinum	100,000^{‡}
^{‡} Sales+streaming figures based on certification alone.
