= The Platinum Collection (Nomadi album) =

Compilation album by Nomadi
- Released: September 26, 2003
- Genre: Rock, Pop
- Length: 176:34
- Label: EMI Music
- Producer: Beppe Carletti

Nomadi chronology
Nomadi 40 (2003)	The Platinum Collection (2003)	Corpo Estraneo (2004)

The Platinum Collection is a 2003 album by Nomadi. The songs, recorded between 1965 and 1976, are collected in strict chronological order. The album includes a few hard to find tracks. The album was certified double platinum.

== Track listing ==
- Disc 1
1. Donna la prima donna (Donna the prima donna) (2' 34")
2. Giorni tristi (2' 45")
3. Come potete giudicar (The revolution kind) (3' 05")
4. Racconta tutto a me (You don't love me) (2' 31")
5. La mia libertà (Girl don't tell me) (2' 10")
6. Noi non ci saremo (2' 41")
7. Un riparo per noi (With a girl like you) (2' 02")
8. Spegni quella luce (2' 12")
9. Dio è morto (2' 39")
10. Per fare un uomo (2' 43")
11. Un figlio dei fiori non pensa al domani (Death of a clown) (3' 02")
12. Vola bambino (Hi ho silver lining) (2' 41")
13. Ho difeso il mio amore (Nights in white satin) (4' 02")
14. Canzone per un'amica (3' 44")
15. Il nome di lei (Gotta see jane) (2' 41")
16. Per quando è tardi (2' 55")
17. Vai via, cosa vuoi (All the love in world) (2' 33")
18. L'auto corre lontano, ma io corro da te (2' 57")
- Disc 2
1. Mai come lei nessuna (Run to the sun) (3' 58")
2. Un autunno insieme e poi... (4' 10")
3. Un pugno di sabbia (3' 00")
4. Io non sono io (2' 32")
5. Ala bianca (Sixty years on) (2' 38")
6. Mille e una sera (2' 54")
7. Non dimenticarti di me (3' 17")
8. Tutto passa (2' 45")
9. So che mi perdonerai (3' 11")
10. Beautiful day (4' 46")
11. Suoni (2' 59")
12. Vola (5' 49")
13. Io vagabondo (3' 07")
14. Eterno (4' 36")
15. Quanti anni ho? (2' 41")
16. Oceano (2' 51")
17. Un giorno insieme (3' 16")
18. Crescerai (3' 20")
- Disc 3
1. Mamma giustizia (4' 21")
2. Voglio ridere (4' 25")
3. Ieri sera sognavo di te (3' 00")
4. Tutto a posto (3' 27")
5. Isola ideale (3' 57")
6. Senza discutere (3' 20")
7. Immagini (3' 25")
8. Gordon (4' 19")
9. Sorprese (3' 29")
10. Quasi, quasi (3' 31")
11. Vittima dei sogni (5' 00")
12. Mil y una noches (3' 00")
13. No te olivides nunca de mi (3' 06")
14. Se que me perdonaras (3' 05")
15. Yo vagabundo (3' 21")
16. Il confine (3' 34")
17. Colori (2' 57")
18. Uno sbaglio (2' 51")

== Chart performance ==
Chart (2003)	Peak position
Italian Albums (FIMI)	1
