= Folk beat n. 1 =

Folk beat n°1

Studio album by Francesco Guccini
- Released: 1967
- Genre: Italian folk
- Length: 41:30
- Producer: Odoardo "Dodo" Veroli

Francesco Guccini chronology
Folk beat n°1 (1967)	Due anni dopo (1970)

Folk beat n°1 (1967) is the first album of Italian singer-songwriter Francesco Guccini. It was published under the name "Francesco" alone.

The record is, as the title suggests, a folk album, intended to adapt the genre within a contemporary Italian context parallel to the music of Phil Ochs or Bob Dylan. Folk beat n.1 deals with various themes, including critiques and satires of Italian society, as well as tragic accounts of both fictional and historical characters (two lyrical fields which would become commonly associated with the cantautore).

The album itself received little recognition once released, though it is said to contain amongst Guccini's most popular songs, which would later become blueprints for his style (including his particular accent, characteristic of the Emilia-Romagna region). The record received a stellar review from Allmusic, where it was said to contain the foundations for his successful career, and be the first showcase of Guccini's songwriting talent; his voice was also deemed "compelling".

== The album ==
The album was recorded in studio Basilica di [Milano in the summer of 1966 and produced by Odoardo "Dodo" Veroli; album was published in March 1967.

The album contains some songs previously written by Guccini for other groups, including Equipe 84 and Nomadi.

The symbolic song of this era is "L'Antisociale" ("The Antisocial"). L'antisociale is a piece of music written by Francesco Guccini in 1960, which was released as a single in September 1966 by Equipe 84 on the 45 rpm single "Un giorno tu mi cercherai"/ "L'antisociale", without author indications. It is a protest song aimed at the hypocritical behaviors and attitudes that existed in Italian society in those years. The protagonist is not an antisocial in the pathological sense, but he is a nonconformist. In fact, he does not accept certain behaviors based on "moral hypocrisy". In practice he does not accept many of the attitudes that belong to the «social» which is the character of the other song, which in his album Folk beat n. 1 is combined with this into a single track. In a certain sense, the protagonist could be defined as a beatnik, in fact towards the end of the 50s it was precisely the members of this group who questioned some traditional canons of "respectability" and the alienating conformism of the consumer society, however he doesn't make alternative life proposals other than going to a desert island where no one will be able to disturb him anymore.

== Personnel ==
- Francesco Guccini - Voice, Rhythm guitar
- Antonio Roveri - Golo guitar
- Alan Cooper - Armonica and Rhythm guitar

== Track listing ==
1. "Noi non ci saremo" - 5:15
2. "In morte di S.F." - 3:41
3. "Venerdì santo" - 4:19
4. "L'atomica cinese" - 2:37
5. "Auschwitz"- 4:40
6. "Talkin' Milano" - 5:30
7. "Statale 17" - 3:12
8. "Il 3 dicembre del '39" - 3:44
9. "La ballata degli annegati" - 2:28
10. "Il sociale e l'antisociale" - 5:33
- Note: "In morte di S.F." is the song known today as "Canzone per un'amica".
