= Daolio =

Daolio is a surname. Notable people with the surname include:

- Augusto Daolio (1947–1992), Italian singer, poet, and painter

== See also ==
- Daolin
