= Ritratti =

Studio album by Francesco Guccini
- Released: 20 February 2004
- Genre: Italian singer-songwriter
- Length: 45:50
- Label: EMI

Francesco Guccini chronology
Francesco Guccini Live @ RTSI (2001)	Ritratti (2004)	Anfiteatro Live (2005)

Ritratti is the twenty-first album by Italian singer-songwriter Francesco Guccini. The title means portraits, and some of the songs of the album are portraits of historical figures. It was released in 2004 by EMI, was generally well received by critics and fans, and remained at the top of the Italian album chart for two weeks.

== Overview ==
Ritratti ("portraits") was released on February 20, 2004, four years after Guccini's last studio album, Stagioni. It consists of nine songs, three of which are portraits of historical figures: "Odysseus" and "Cristoforo Colombo", in which Guccini focuses on the theme of travel through the voices of Ulysses and Columbus, and "Canzone per il Che", the second Guccini's song in honour of Ernesto "Che" Guevara after "Stagioni", included in the album of the same name. "Piazza Alimonda" is about the demonstrations at the 2001 G8 Summit in Genoa and the death of Carlo Giuliani during the riots. There are several literary references throughout the album, especially in "Odysseus", which references the Odyssey, the Canto 26 of Dante's Inferno, and "A Zacinto", a poem by Foscolo. "La ziatta" was translated in the dialect of Modena by Guccini from "La tieta" by Joan Manuel Serrat, while "La tua libertà" was a song first written in 1971 but never recorded before.

== Reception ==
The album was generally well received by critics. The Italian music website Ondarock gave it a 6.5 mark, saying Ritratti was not outstanding for its music but for its lyrics, which "face current affairs both seriously and lightly". The two major Italian newspapers also praised the album; the Corriere della Sera said it contained songs which are still necessary, and the fact that Guccini did not change his style was "a piece of luck", while La Repubblica described the album as an "earthquake of sharp words". The website Rockol.it, in its review, criticised the album, saying it was "old, anachronistic, with songs full of obsolete images".

Ritratti was a commercial success: it reached the number one spot in the FIMI Albums Chart, and held it for two weeks, from February 26 to March 11. It remained in the Top 20 chart for eight weeks.

== Track listing ==
No.	Title	Lyrics	Music	Length
1.	"Odysseus"			4:29
2.	"Una canzone"			4:39
3.	"Canzone per il Che"	Manuel Vázquez Montalbán – Francesco Guccini	Juan Carlos Biondini	5:14
4.	"Piazza Alimonda"			5:53
5.	"Vite"			5:38
6.	"Cristoforo Colombo"	Giuseppe Dati – Francesco Guccini	Giuseppe Dati – Marco Fontana	5:50
7.	"Certo non-sai"			4:28
8.	"La ziatta"	Joan Manuel Serrat – Francesco Guccini	Joan Manuel Serrat	5:48
9.	"La tua libertà"		Antonio Marangolo	4:37

== Personnel ==
- Vince Tempera – piano, keyboards
- Antonio Marangolo – saxophone, percussion
- Roberto Manuzzi – saxophone, keyboards
- Ares Tavolazzi – bass guitar, double bass
- Juan Carlos Biondini – guitar, backing vocals, bouzouki
- Ellade Bandini – drums
- Daniele Di Bonaventura – bandoneón
- Giancarlo Bianchetti – rhythm guitar (in "Odysseus")
