= Nomadi 40 =

Studio album by Nomadi
- Released: May 23, 2003
- Genre: Rock, Pop
- Length: 148:45
- Label: CGD East West
- Producer: Beppe Carletti

Nomadi chronology
Amore che prendi amore che dai (2002)	Nomadi 40 (2003)	The platinum collection (2003)

Nomadi 40 is a double album by Nomadi. Their twenty-eighth album, it celebrates the fortieth year of their musical career. Nomadi 40 contains a mix of old and new songs. It was certified platinum.

The last track of the second disc, Come Potete Giudicar, is the version recorded in 1992 by Augustus Daolio, Beppe Carletti, Dante Pergreffi, Cico Falzone and Daniele Campani on the album Ma Noi No.

== Personnel ==
- Beppe Carletti: Keyboards
- Cico Falzone: Guitar
- Daniele Campani: Drums
- Danilo Sacco: Voice and Guitar
- Massimo Vecchi: Bass and Voice
- Sergio Reggioli: Percussion and Violin

== Track listing ==
- Disc 1
1. Noi non ci saremo (3' 05")
2. Gordon (4' 18")
3. Tutto a posto (4' 18")
4. Gli aironi neri (4' 31")
5. Il vento del nord (4' 51")
6. L'uomo di Monaco (4' 15")
7. Il fiore nero (3' 19")
8. I miei anni (4' 45")
9. Un pugno di sabbia (4' 37")
10. Per fare un uomo (3' 33")
11. Canzone per un'amica (4' 19")
12. Lontano (4' 29")
13. Un giorno insieme (3' 58")
14. Il vecchio e il bambino (4' 36")
15. L'angelo caduto (4' 19")
16. Io vagabondo (3' 54")
17. Voglio ridere (4' 23")
18. E di notte (4' 21")
- Disc 2
1. Io voglio vivere (4' 58")
2. La libertà di volare (4' 11")
3. La vita che seduce (4' 28")
4. Una storia da raccontare (3' 19")
5. Auschwitz (6' 00")
6. Naracauli (5' 06")
7. Sangue al cuore (4' 34")
8. Le strade (4' 41")
9. Né gioia né dolore (4' 49")
10. Il nome che non hai (4' 34")
11. Ho difeso il mio amore (4' 29")
12. Dio è morto (2' 49")
13. Ti lascio una parola (Goodbye) (4' 31")
14. Vivo forte (7' 25")
15. Senza discutere (3' 33")
16. Come potete giudicar (3' 27")

== Chart performance ==
Chart (2003)	Peak position
Italian Albums (FIMI)	2

== Certifications ==
During 2025, Nomadi 40 was certified platinum in Italy.
