= Auschwitz (disambiguation) =

The Auschwitz concentration camp was a complex of over 40 concentration and extermination camps built and operated by Nazi Germany in occupied Poland during World War II and the Holocaust.

Auschwitz may also refer to:

== Places ==
- Oświęcim (German: Auschwitz), a Polish town after which the concentration camp was named
- Duchy of Oświęcim, a historical division of Silesia

== Arts, entertainment and media ==
- Auschwitz (film), 2011
- Auschwitz: The Nazis and 'The Final Solution', a 2005 TV documentary
- "Auschwitz" (song), a 1966 song by Francesco Guccini, performed by Equipe 84
- Auschwitz: A Doctor's Eyewitness Account, a 1961 book by Miklos Nyiszli
