= Corpo Estraneo =

Studio album by Nomadi
- Released: October 29, 2004
- Genre: Rock, Pop
- Length: 45:59
- Label: EMI Music
- Producer: Beppe Carletti

Nomadi chronology
The platinum collection (2003)	Corpo Estraneo (2004)	Con me o contro di me (2006)

Corpo Estraneo (Foreign Body) is the twenty-ninth album by the band Nomadi. There were three singles released from the album: Oriente, which a video was filmed for, Corpo Estraneo, and In Piedi. The album was certified platinum just from its presales.

== Personnel ==
- Beppe Carletti: Keyboards
- Cico Falzone: Guitar
- Daniele Campani: Drums
- Danilo Sacco: Voice and Guitar
- Massimo Vecchi: Bass and Voice
- Sergio Reggioli: Percussion and Violin

== Track listing ==
1. L'ordine dall'alto (4:15)
2. Oriente (4:42)
3. Essere o non essere (4:11)
4. In piedi (4:36)
5. Stella cieca (3:36)
6. Confesso (3:24)
7. Corpo estraneo (4:10)
8. Stringi i pugni (4:40)
9. Vulcani (4:22)
10. Soldato (4:39)
11. La voce dell'amore (4:24)

== Chart performance ==
Chart (2004)	Peak position
Italian Albums (FIMI)	4
