= Jimmy Villotti =

Italian musician (1944–2023)

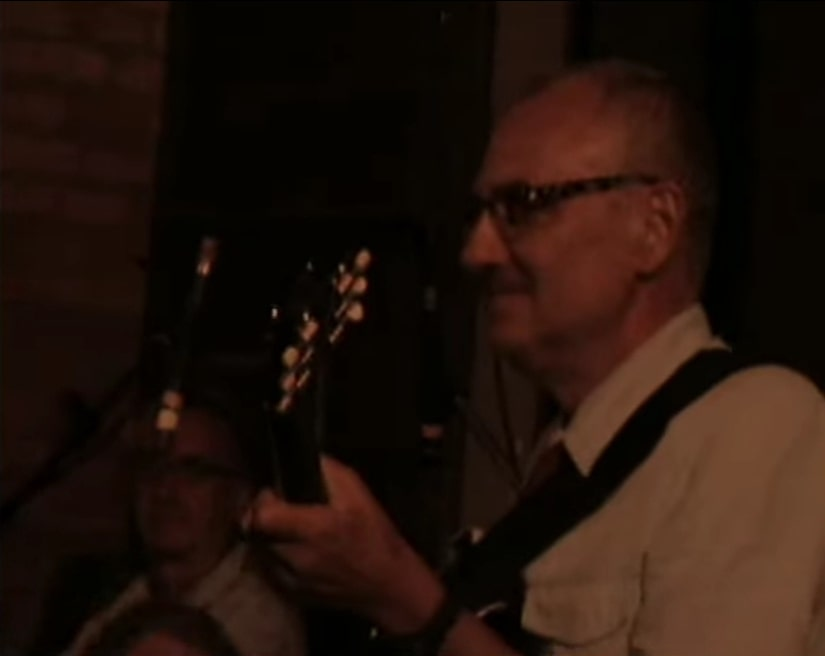
- Villotti in 2011
- Born: 14 February 1944; Budrio, Italy
- Died: 6 December 2023 (aged 79); Bologna, Italy
- Occupations: Jazz guitarist; Writer

Marco Villotti (14 February 1944 – 6 December 2023), known professionally as Jimmy Villotti, was an Italian jazz guitarist and writer.

== Life and career ==
Born Marco Villotti in Budrio, he grew up in Bologna, studying piano and guitar. From 1963 he played with a group Meteors; they made recordings and appeared with the broadcaster RCA Italiana, accompanying Gianni Morandi. He played with other beat groups, such as Forlì's I Baci, with Vasco Rossi's future bassist, Claudio Golinelli, and Ivan Graziani's future drummer, Gilberto Rossi. In the 1970s he formed the progressive rock group Jimmy M.E.C. with Fio Zanotti; they released a recording for Fonit Cetra. Villotti played with musicians such as Augusto Martelli (1974), and Andrea Mingardi and Lucio Dalla (1977).

In 1978 he composed the rock opera Giulio Cesare, for singers, chorus and an orchestra of 30 players. He then produced the album Pesissimo! with the Skiantos (1980). He played with artists such as Francesco Guccini (1979), Claudio Lolli, Sergio Endrigo, Ornella Vanoni, Luca Carboni and Morandi (1981–1984).

Villotti decided to focus on his true passion, jazz, with daily experiments in the studio. He was inspired by Steve Grossman, Tony Castellano, George Coleman, Al Bacon and René Thomas. His first album was Jimmy Villotti 1993; it contains the original and partly autobiographical "Drin drin" and "Si fidi ci ho il fez", with a fusion of jazz elements, easy-listening pop and ironic lyrics, sung by Villotti. He later turned to writing, such as a fictional account of himself and his Bologna. He wrote the intense "Io sono un treno" (I am a train) for Morandi, about the life of musicians on a continuous journey.

Later works, including Naturally Imperfect in 2002, feature a style that has little to do with jazz. In 2008 he was awarded the I suoni della Canzone, given by the Club Tenco in Sanremo in recognition of musicians who collaborate or have collaborated with the big names in Italian song, and presented during an annual songwriting festival. In 2019 he wrote Onyricana, published by Calamaro Edizioni, a book recounting a hidden world of imagination coming from dreams and the unconscious.

=== Personal life ===
Villotti was married to Natascia Mazza, a teacher, on 12 September 2013, but they had lived together for 20 years.

Villotti died in Bologna on 6 December 2023, at the age of 79, after a long illness.

== Recordings ==
- Jimtonic – Assist, ZPLAS 34215 (1988)
- Jimmy Villotti – Polygram Mercury (1993)
- Si fidi ci ho il fez – Polygram Mercury (1995)
- Solo difficoltà, Nessun dubbio – Poligram Mercury (1997)
- Rigorosamente grezzo – l'Alternativa (1999)
- Naturalmente imperfetto – Nun Entertainment (2002)
- In memoria di David Lazzaretti – (solo piano, 2004)
- Optional? musica Soul Jazz in trio – (2004)

== Works ==
His works include:

- Diario à la cocque – Andromeda (1987)
- Stoccate, ferite e resoconti – Andromeda (1989)
- Gli sbudellati. Tra la via Emilia e il jazz – Sperling & Kupfer (1994)
- Il decalogo del mio viver bene – Arcadia (1999)
- Oringhen. Frammenti di notti bolognesi – Tipografia Nettuno (2000)
- La penultima donna – Pendragon (2003)
- Va' con Dio – Aliberti editore (2006)
- Onyricana – Calamaro Edizioni (2019)
