= MONOtono =

Mono Tono

Studio album by Skiantos
- Released: 9 July 1978
- Genre: Punk rock
- Label: Cramps
- Producer: Paolo Tofani

Skiantos chronology
Inascoltable (1977)	Mono Tono (1978)	Kinotto (1979)

Mono Tono is the second album by the Skiantos, released in 1978 by Cramps Records.

== Track listing ==
1. Eptadone
2. Panka rock
3. Pesto duro (I kunt get no satisfucktion)
4. Diventa demente (la kultura poi ti kura)
5. Io me la meno
6. Bau bau baby
7. Io sono uno skianto
8. Io ti amo da matti (sesso & karnazza)
9. Vortice
10. Massacrami pure
11. Largo all'avanguardia
12. Ehi, ehi, ma che piedi che c'hai

== Line up ==
- Roberto "Freak" Antoni - voice
- Fabio "Dandy Bestia" Testoni - guitar
- Andrea "Jimmy Bellafronte" Setti - voice
- Stefano "Sbarbo" Cavedoni - voice
- Andrea "Andy Bellombrosa" Dalla Valle - guitar
- Franco "Frankie Grossolani" Villani - bass guitar
- Leo "Tormento Pestoduro" Ghezzi - drums
