= Due anni dopo =

Studio album by Francesco Guccini
- Released: January 1970
- Recorded: November 1969
- Genre: Italian singer-songwriter
- Length: 40:44
- Label: EMI

Francesco Guccini chronology
Folk beat n. 1 (1967)	Due anni dopo (1970)	L'isola non trovata (1970)

Due anni dopo is the second album by Italian singer-songwriter Francesco Guccini. It was released in 1970 by EMI.

== Overview ==
The album was recorded in November 1969 in Milan. On the front cover the name was simply "Francesco"; this was the second time that had happened, as Folk beat n. 1, Guccini's debut, featured this as well. Due anni dopo was the first album in which Guccini collaborated with Deborah Kooperman, an American folksinger who played fingerstyle guitar, a style which was not well known in Italy at the time. Her name was misspelled as "Deborah Kopperman" in the credits. Giorgio Vacchi is listed as arranger, while Guccini wrote all the songs on the album. The main theme was the passage of time, and how bourgeois hypocrisy affects everyday life; notable influences were French music and the style of the Italian poet Giacomo Leopardi. "Primavera di Praga" was a criticism of the 1968 Soviet occupation of Czechoslovakia, while the title track is about the years he spent in Modena, in his teens. The two songs, along with "Vedi cara", became Guccini's classics.

== Reception ==
The album was generally well received by critics. Allmusic says it was a "strong collection", while the Italian music website Ondarock states Due anni dopo had lyrics with clear "poetic and narrative connotations".

== Track listing ==
Side A

1. "Lui e lei" – 3:12
2. "Primavera di Praga" – 3:38
3. "Giorno d'estate" – 3:47
4. "Il compleanno" – 3:31
5. "L'albero ed io" – 2:54
6. "Due anni dopo" – 3:43

Side B

1. "La verità" – 3:21
2. "Per quando è tardi" – 3:31
3. "Vedi cara" – 4:58
4. "Ophelia" – 2:26
5. "L'ubriaco" – 2:33
6. "Al trist" – 3:41
