= Metropolis (Guccini album) =

Studio album by Francesco Guccini
- Released: 1981
- Genre: Italian singer-songwriters
- Length: 31:50 min.
- Label: EMI Italiana
- Producer: Ettore De Carolis

Francesco Guccini chronology
Amerigo (1978)	Metropolis (1981)	Guccini (1983)

Metropolis is an album by the Italian singer-songwriter Francesco Guccini, released in May 1981 by Emi Italiana.

== Track listing ==
All songs by Francesco Guccini, except where indicated.

1. "Bisanzio" – 5:14
2. "Venezia" – 4:06 (Lyrics: Gian Piero Alloisio, some modification from Francesco Guccini; Music: Gian Piero Alloisio)
3. "Antenòr" – 5:19
4. "Bologna" – 4:41
5. "Lager" – 3:46
6. "Black-out" – 3:56
7. "Milano (poveri bimbi di)" – 4:53 (Lyrics: Guccini, Allosio; Music: Guccini)

== Personnel ==
- Francesco Guccini – vocals, guitar
- Deborah Kooperman – banjo
- Tiziano Barbieri – bass
- Giovanni Pezzoli – drums
- Paolo Gianolio – guitar
- Vince Tempera – keyboard
- Jimmy Villotti – guitar
- Luciano Stella – keyboard
- Juan Carlos Biondini – guitar
- Fio Zanotti – keyboard
- Giancarlo Ferri – violin
- Andy J. Forest – harmonica
- Enzo Felicitati – trumpet
- Giampiero Lucchini – flute

== Charts ==
Chart	Position (Maximum)
Italy - Albums (End of Year 1981)	29
Italy - Albums (Weekly)	6
