= Loriano Macchiavelli =

Italian mystery writer and playwright (born 1934)

Loriano Macchiavelli (born March 12, 1934) is an Italian mystery writer and playwright.

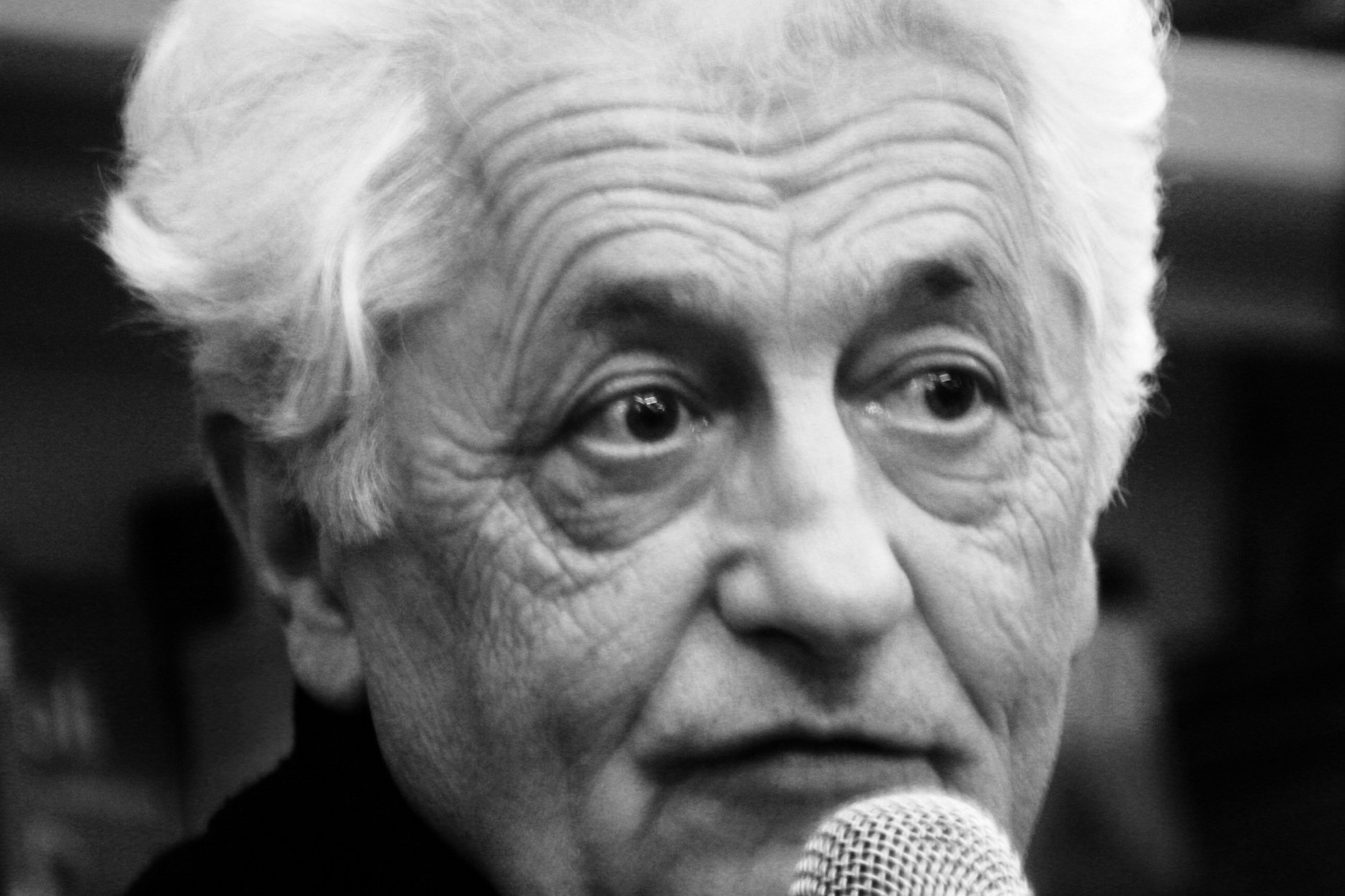
Portrait of Macchiavelli in 2008

Macchiavelli was born in Vergato, near Bologna. He worked also a theatre impresario, actor, and playwright.

As a writer, his most famous character is Sarti Antonio (surname written first), a Bolognese police detective, characterized by a strong morality but mediocre investigative capabilities; in his tales he is often helped by the sharper mind of Rosas, a smart university student. Sarti's stories have been turned into a television series in 1991, followed by an Italian-German co-production of six films, broadcast in April and May 1994. He was also the protagonist of a comics series published in the Italian magazine Orient Express.

More recently, Macchiavelli has written a series of detective novels in collaboration with singer-songwriter Francesco Guccini having a Carabinieri maresciallo, Benedetto Santovito, as the protagonist.

Machiavelli's books have been published in France, Germany, Portugal, Spain, Hungary, Czechoslovakia, Soviet Union, Japan, Romania, and other countries.
