= Vincenzo Pappalettera =

Italian historian

Vincenzo Pappalettera (November 28, 1919 in Milan – December 1, 1998 in Cesano Maderno) was an Italian writer and historian, notable for his firsthand account of his imprisonment in the Mauthausen-Gusen concentration camp during the Second World War.

He was born into a well-known family of Apulia. As a young anti-fascist and a member of the Italian resistance against the German occupation of Northern Italy, in 1943 he was arrested and sent to the infamous Mauthausen-Gusen camp complex. Although his stay in the camp was relatively short as compared to other inmates of other nationalities, his account of the imprisonment was among the first books on the topic written in Italian and was widely acclaimed as one of the best by the Italian critics.

After the war, Pappalettera continued his historical studies and focused on the recent history of the war-time Nazi concentration camps, both as a historical and sociological phenomenon.

== Works ==
- Tu passerai per il camino (You Are Going Through the Chimney)
- Ritorno alla vita (Return to Life)
- Nei lager c’ero anch’io
- La parola agli aguzzini, an extensive study of the Nuremberg Trial.
