= Guccini (album) =

1983 album by Francesco Guccini

Studio album by Francesco Guccini
- Released: 1983
- Label: EMI Italiana
- Producer: Renzo Fantini

Francesco Guccini chronology
Metropolis (1983)	Guccini (1983)	Fra la Via Emilia e il West (1984)

Guccini is an album by the Italian singer-songwriter Francesco Guccini, released in 1983.

== Track listing ==
All songs by Francesco Guccini, with the exception of "Gulliver" by Guccini-Alloisio-Guccini.

1. "Autogrill" (4:52)
2. "Argentina" (5:18)
3. "Gulliver" (4:20)
4. "Shomèr ma mi-llailah?" (5:35)
5. "Inutile" (5:14)
6. "Gli amici" (4:43)
