= Augusto Daolio =

Italian singer (1947–1992)

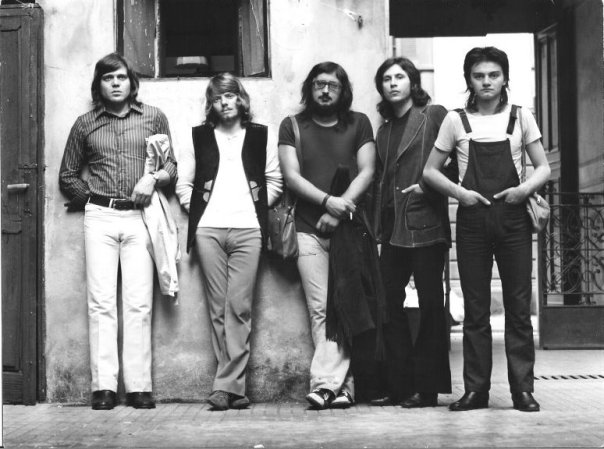
Augusto Daolio (center) with the Nomadi in 1972

Augusto Daolio (18 February 1947 in Novellara – 7 October 1992 in Novellara) was an Italian singer, poet, and painter. He was a co-founder member and the frontman of the band I Nomadi.

He founded I Nomadi in 1963, together with Beppe Carletti, Franco Midili, Leonardo Manfredini, Gualtiero Gelmini and Antonio Campari, remaining the historical co-leader of the band together with Carletti.

He died at the age of 45 from an aggressive form of lung cancer.

== See also ==
- I Nomadi
