= D'amore di morte e di altre sciocchezze =

Studio album by Francesco Guccini
- Released: November 15, 1996
- Label: EMI

Francesco Guccini chronology
Parnassius Guccinii (1994)	D'amore di morte e di altre sciocchezze (1996)	1998 – Guccini Live Collection (live) (2000)

D'amore di morte e di altre sciocchezze is a 1996 studio album by Italian singer-songwriter Francesco Guccini. The album, whose name means "Of Love, Death, and Other Trifles," charted in Italy.

== Track listing ==
1. "Lettera"
2. "Vorrei"
3. "Quattro stracci"
4. "Stelle"
5. "Canzone delle colombe e del fiore"
6. "Il caduto"
7. "Cirano"
8. "Il matto"
9. "I fichi"
