= Skiantos =

Italian comedy punk band

- Origin: Bologna, Italy
- Genres: Comedy rock; punk rock; new wave
- Years active: 1975–1980; 1984; 1987–2012; 2016–present
- Labels: Universal; EMI
- Members: Roberto Morsiani; Luca Testoni; Massimo Magnani; Gianluca Schiavon
- Past members: Roberto Antoni (deceased); Fabio Testoni (deceased)
- Website: skiantos.com

Skiantos is an Italian comedy punk band formed in Bologna in 1975. They have released ten studio albums, two live albums and five compilation albums. They participated in the Gods of Demential festival on 12 January 2007.

== Background ==
The group formed in the mid-1970s, and their initial repertoire mainly consisted of cover songs. After some demo tapes, the project became more concrete in 1977 with Inascoltable, an experimental improvised live album which was only distributed on cassette and which according to Freak Antoni was recorded in "a night of improvisation for ten people in love of music".

The group's concerts, especially ones earlier in their career, were characterized by provocative performances with references to Futurism and Dadaism at the forefront, including the musicians throwing vegetables into the audience.

In 1978, the group made their official debut with MONOtono, an album considered the manifesto of the band, characterized by "raw sounds, out of time music, voices out of tune and lyrics that reveal a non-vulgar aggressiveness, made of no sense, paradoxes and puns."

On April 2, 1979, Skiantos participated in the Bologna Rock punk rock and new wave festival, where their performance attracted much publicity. The band brought on stage a kitchen, a table, a TV and a fridge, boiled some spaghetti and then ate it, without playing anything; the audience protested, and Antoni responded, "You do not understand a fucking thing: this is avant-garde, you piece-of-shit audience."

The same year, they released the album Kinotto, containing their hit Mi piaccion le sbarbine. Shortly later the leader Freak Antoni left the group, dedicating to some solo musical and literary projects with the stage names Beppe Starnazza and later Astro Vitelli. The original lineup of the group reformed in 1984, when they released the album Ti spalmo la crema.

Roberto "Freak" Antoni, leader of the band, born 16 April 1954, died in Bologna on 12 February 2014, at the age of 59. Guitarist and vocalist Fabio "Dandy Bestia" Testoni, born 2 July 1952, died on 16 March 2025, at the age of 72.

== Personnel ==
Current members

- Roberto "Granito" Morsiani – drums, vocals (1989–2007, 2016–present)
- Luca "Tornado" Testoni – guitars, vocals (1992, 1993, 1996–2012, 2016–present)
- Massimo "Max Magnus" Magnani – vocals, bass (2003–2012, 2016–present)
- Gianluca "Giangi La Molla" Schiavon – drums, vocals (2007–2012, 2016–present)

Former members

- Roberto "Freak" Antoni – vocals (1975–1980, 1984, 1987–2012; died 2014)
- Fabio "Dandy Bestia" Testoni – guitars, vocals (1977–1979, 1984, 1987–2012, 2016–2025; died 2025)
- Andrea "Jimmy Bellafronte" Setti – vocals (1975–1980, 1991, 1999)
- Stefano "Sbarbo" Cavedoni – vocals (1977–1980, 1984, 1999, 2003)
- Bubba Loris – vocals (1975–1978)
- Mario "Come-Lini" Comellini – vocals (1975–1977)
- Linda Linetti – vocals (1980)
- Sandro "Belluomo" Dall'Omo – keyboards (1989–1992)
- Andrea "Andy Bellombrosa" Dalla Valle – guitars (1977–1980, 1999)
- Gianni "Lo Grezzo" Bolelli – guitars (1977, 1979–1980)
- Carlo "Charlie Molinella" Atti – tenor saxophone (1987–1991, 2009)
- Franco "Frankie Grossolani" Villani – bass (1977–1980)
- Stefano "Ringo" Sarti – bass (1977)
- Lucio Bellagamba – bass (1987–1989)
- Marco "Marmo" Nanni – bass (1989–2003)
- Leonardo "Tormento Pestoduro" Ghezzi – drums (1977–1980, 1999)
- J. Tornado – drums (1987–1988)
- Fabio "Tormento Pestolesto" Grandi – drums (1988–1989)
- Sergio Piccinini – drums (1987)

Touring musician

- Nevruz – drums, vocals (2019–present)

== Discography ==
- Inascoltable (1977)
- MONOtono (1978)
- Kinotto (1979)
- Pesissimo! (1980)
- Ti spalmo la crema (1984)
- Non c'è gusto in Italia ad essere intelligenti (1987)
- Troppo rischio per un uomo solo (1989)
- Signore dei dischi (1992)
- Saluti da Cortina (1993)
- Doppia dose (1999)
- Sogno improbabile (2005)
- Sesso pazzo (2006)
- Dio ci deve delle spiegazioni (2009)

=== Singles & EP ===
- 1978 - "Karabigniere Blues / Io sono un autonomo"
- 1980 - "Fagioli / Mi piaccion le sbarbine"
- 1999 - "Gratis"
- 2002 - "Virus"
- 2006 - "Sesso pazzo"
- 2009 - "Phogna - The Dark Side of the Skiantos" (EP)
