= Nomadi =

Italian pop rock band

Nomadi (or I Nomadi, meaning "Nomads") is an Italian band formed in 1963 and still present on the music scene.

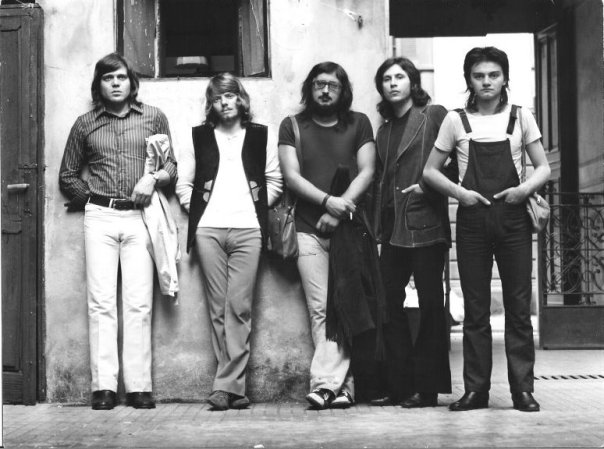
Nomadi in 1972

== Career ==
=== Origins ===
In 1961, Beppe Carletti and Leonardo Manfredini formed the group I Monelli (‘Urchins’). In 1962, Carletti met Franco Midilli, guitarist of the group Novellara, who joined them in Monelli. In 1963, Franco Midilli introduced Augusto Daolio to Beppe Carletti and he too joined the group. In that year the band’s name was changed to Nomadi.

=== I Nomadi of Augusto Daolio ===
I Nomadi sprang from one of the most fervent periods of the Italian music scene: the 1960s. In those years an economic boom revealed an Italy economically enriched but already socially impoverished. Tens, if not hundreds, of groups appeared and disappeared attempting to express the voice of a youth who felt repressed by a society still permeated with antiquated conventions.

The original 1963 formation of six was founded in Reggio Emilia: Augusto Daolio (vocals), Beppe Carletti (keyboards), Franco Midili (guitar), Leonardo Manfredini (drums), Gualtiero Gelmini (sax), Antonio Campari (bass). In the same year, Nomadi were signed by Frankfurt Bar in Riccione.

Franco Midilli had to leave the group that summer for compulsory military service. As often happens, the lineup changed frequently: in 1964 Madfredini left after the death of his parents; so did Campari and Gelmini, who were replaced by Gabriele ‘Bila’ Copellini on drums and Gianni Coron on bass.

In 1965 they released their first 45", featuring the song "Donna, la Prima Donna" ("Woman, the First Woman") and "Giorni Tristi" ("Sad Days") with the collaboration of De Ponti and of Odoardo Veroli (known as Dodo) as writer and composer.

Their first hit was 1966's "Come potete giudicar" (How Can You Judge, which was actually the cover of Sonny Bono's "The Revolution Kind"), anthem of the Italian Beat Generation, which exemplifies the clash between hippies and conservatives. In the wake of this success, I Nomadi came into contact with a young and then unknown writer, Francesco Guccini, who would go on to give them other successes: "Noi non ci saremo" ("We Won't Be There"), "Dio è morto" ("God is Dead"), "Canzone per un'amica" ("Song for a Friend").

Their great success continued in the following years. Hits included "Io Vagabondo" ("I, Vagabond"), "Un pugno di sabbia" ("A Fistful of Sand"), "Un giorno insieme" ("One Day Together"), "Tutto a posto" ("Everything Settled"), "Voglio ridere" ("I Want to Laugh").

I Nomadi's political commitment is particularly evident in some songs such as "Primavera di Praga" ("Prague Spring"), written by Guccini and dedicated to Czech student Jan Palach.

=== The "new" Nomadi ===
In 1990 Cico Falzone and Daniele Campani joined the group, on guitar and drums respectively. In 1992 bass player Dante Pergreffi was killed in a car crash on 14 May and then, on 7 October, Augusto Daolio, the band's frontman and icon, died of an aggressive form of lung cancer. Despite the shock and despair of their many fans, the group decided to continue with Danilo Sacco doing vocals, Francesco Gualerzi on wind and vocals and Elisa Minari on bass. Gualerzi and Minari left the group at the end of 1997 and were replaced by Massimo Vecchi and Andrea Pozzoli, who took part in the summer tour of that year and was then replaced by Sergio Reggioli, enchanting on violin. The new lineup convinced the fans and Nomadi continue even now to release new albums.

=== 40th anniversary ===
In 2003 Nomadi celebrated their 40th year as a band with a three-day show at Riccione followed by three more concerts and other events related to the past and the future of the group.

== The music and the message ==
The message that Nomadi has promoted from its beginning is of denunciation and social commitment, clean and never too political. They carry it throughout Italy, even in the smallest towns.

Their sound is instantly recognisable for its cleanness and simplicity, even if some arrangements on the old albums tended to be a bit overblown as was typical of the 1960s in general.

In 2003 they released Quaranta (Forty), a double CD with 34 tracks. In 2004 the new album Corpo Estraneo (Foreign Body) came out and went platinum just on advance sales. The single Oriente (East) was successful on many radio stations and the tour sold out every show.

They came first in the Groups category of the Sanremo Music Festival 2006 with the track Dove si Va (Where Does One Go).

The new album Con Me o Contro di Me (With Me or Against Me) came out at the beginning of March 2006 and sold 90,000 copies in the first four days, going platinum, and in 2007 they released Orchestra, an album-live.

In 2011, the singer Danilo Sacco left the band, and was replaced by Christian Turato. Part of a new experience for the group, which is approaching 50 years of activity.

== Members ==
- Vocals:
  - Augusto Daolio (1963–1992)
  - Francesco Gualerzi (1993–1998)
  - Danilo Sacco (1993–2011)
  - Massimo Vecchi (1998–)
  - Cristiano Turato (2012–2017)
  - Yuri Cilloni (2017–)
- Keyboards:
  - Beppe Carletti (1963–)
- Guitar:
  - Franco Midili (1963–1972 and 1973–1974)
  - Amos Amaranti (1972–1973)
  - Chris Dennis (1974–1990)
  - Cico Falzone (1990–)
- Bass:
  - Gianni Coron (1963–1970)
  - Umberto Maggi (1970–1984)
  - Dante Pergreffi (1984–1992)
  - Elisa Minari (1992–1998)
  - Massimo Vecchi (1998–)
- Drums:
  - Bila Copellini (1963–1969)
  - Paolo Lancelotti (1969–1990)
  - Daniele Campani (1990–2023)
  - Domenico Inguaggiato (2024-
- Percussion and Violin:
  - Sergio Reggioli (1998–)
- Percussion and Harp:
  - Andrea Pozzoli (1998)

== Discography ==
- Per quando noi non ci saremo (1967, official album)
- I Nomadi (1968, official album)
- Mille e una sera (1971, collection)
- So che mi perdonerai (1971, collection)
- Io vagabondo (1972, collection)
- Un giorno insieme (1973, official album)
- I Nomadi cantano Guccini (1973, collection)
- I Nomadi interpretano Guccini (1974, official album)
- Canzoni d'oltremanica e d'oltreoceano (1974, collection)
- Tutto a posto (1974, collection)
- Gordon (1975, official album)
- Collezione (1976, collection)
- Noi ci saremo (1977, official album)
- Naracauli e altre storie (1978, official album)
- Album concerto (1979, official album)
- I Nomadi (1980, collection)
- I Nomadi 1 (1981, collection)
- Sempre Nomadi (1981, official album)
- Ancora una volta con sentimento (1982, official album)
- I Nomadi 2 (1983, collection)
- Ci penserà poi il computer (1985, official album)
- Quando viene sera (1986, official album)
- Nomadi in concerto (1987, double live, official album)
- I Nomadi 3 (1987, collection)
- Ancora Nomadi (1988, official album)
- Solo Nomadi (1990, official album)
- Gente come noi (1991, official album)
- Ma noi no! (1992, official album)
- Ma che film la vita (1992, official album)
- Contro (1993, official album)
- EMI Music Collection – I Nomadi (1993, collection)
- Chiedi chi erano i Nomadi (1994, collection)
- La settima onda (1994, official album)
- Tributo ad Augusto (1995, tribute)
- La musica dei '70 – La rabbia, l'amore, la poesia (1995, collection)
- Lungo le vie del vento (1995, official album)
- Quando ci sarai (1996, official album)
- D'amore e altre storie (1997, collection)
- Le strade, gli amici, il concerto (1997, double live, official album)
- Una storia da raccontare (1998, official album)
- In Italia erano i Nomadi (1998, collection)
- SOS con rabbia e con amore (1999, official album)
- Liberi di volare (2000, official album)
- Amore che prendi amore che dai (2002, official album)
- Nomadi 40 (2003, official album)
- The platinum collection (2003, collection)
- Corpo Estraneo (2004, official album)
- Con Me o Contro di Me (2006, official album)
- The platinum collection 2 (2006, collection)
- Nomadi & Omnia Symphony Orchestra live 2007 (2007, double live, official album)
- Allo specchio (2009, official album)
- Raccontiraccolti (2010, official album)
- I Nomadi ed altre storie – Best & Rarities (2010, collection)
- In Viaggio (2010, 8 CD+2 DVD, collection)
- Canzoni nel vento (live 1987–1989) (2011, official album)
- Cuore vivo (2011, official album)
- E' stato bellissimo (2012, official album)
- Terzo tempo (2012, official album)
- I Nomadi 1965/1979 (2016, collection)
- Nomadi 55 – Per tutta la vita (2018, collection)
