= Ares Tavolazzi =

Italian bass player and jazz musician (born 1948)

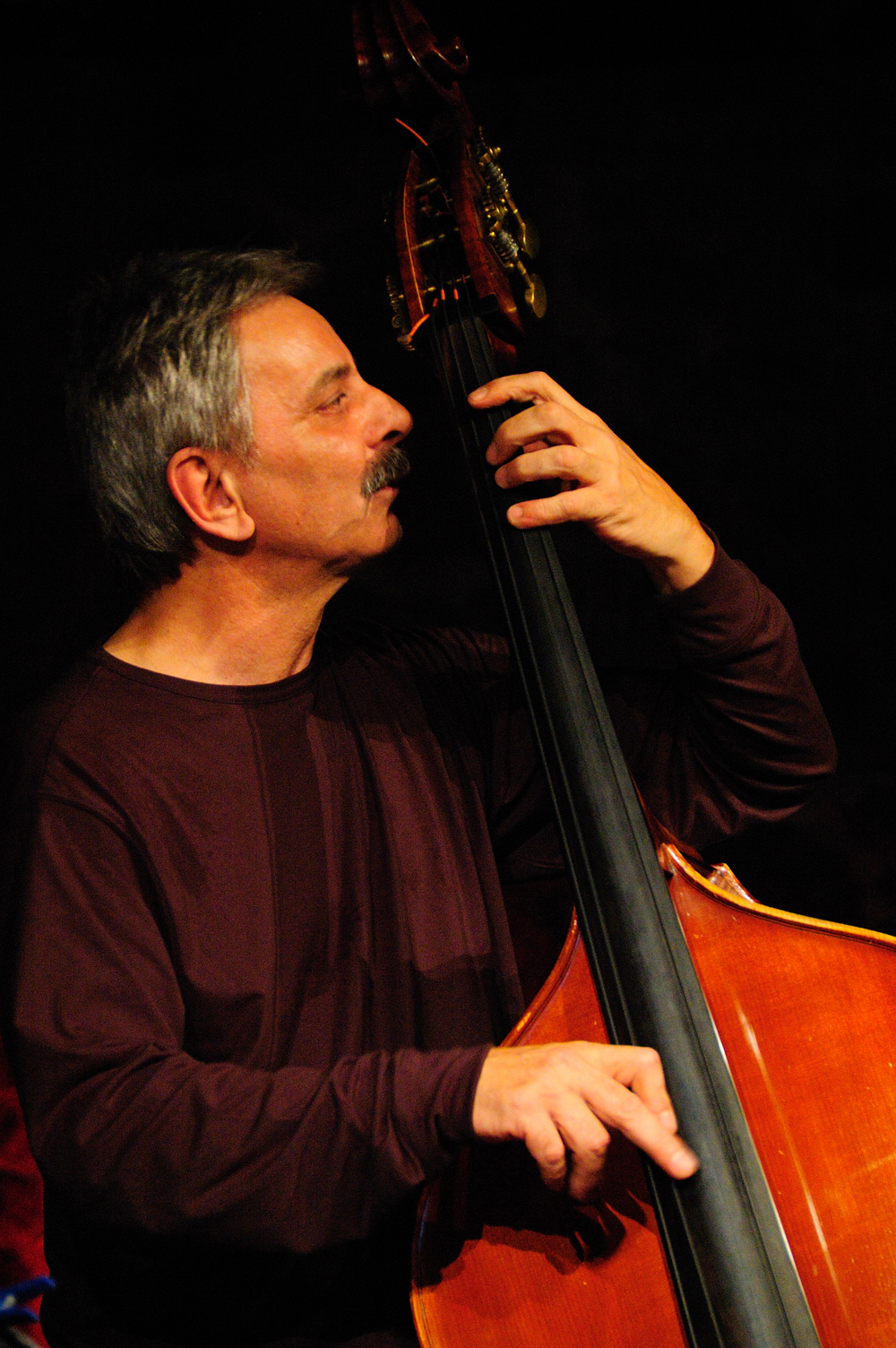
Ares Tavolazzi

Ares Tavolazzi (born July 1948) is an Italian bass player and jazz musician born in Ferrara.

== Biography ==
Tavolazzi studied cello and double bass in the Music School of Ferrara and began his career as bassist playing for Carmen Villani in a beat group, with his future collaborator, drummer Ellade Bandini. With the latter and Vince Tempera, he founded in 1969 a band called The Pleasure Machine, which released five singles in the three following years. The trio also participated in Francesco Guccini's L'isola non trovata and in Terra in bocca of I Giganti. In 1973, after The Pleasure Machine had disbanded, he became a member of the avantgarde band Area, replacing Patrick Djivas. He also frequented the jazz world in New York City. In 1978, he played bass in the song accompanying the Italian version of 'Grendizer anime manga'.

Tavolazzi, who remained in Area until 1983, was first in the classification of best Italian bass guitarist of the magazine Guitar Club from 1984 to 1986. In 1987 he won the A. Willaert Award as Best Musician of the Year.

Since 1982 he has collaborated with numerous singers and musicians, including Mina, Eugenio Finardi, Paolo Conte, Paolo Fresu, Vinicio Capossela and others. He has played in all Francesco Guccini's albums from 1983 to 2004, as well as all his concerts.

== See also ==
- List of jazz bassists
