= Claudio Lolli =

Italian musical artist (1950–2018)

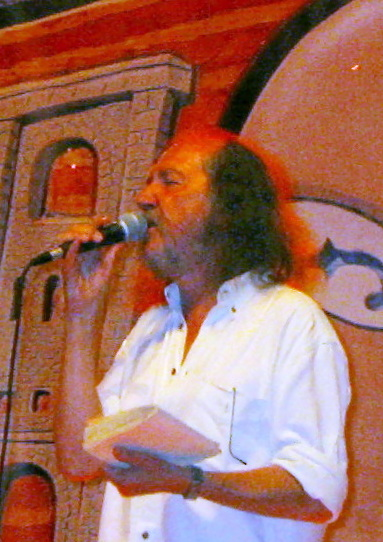
- Claudio Lolli in concert (2005)

Background information
- Born: March 28, 1950
- Origin: Bologna, Italy
- Died: August 17, 2018 (aged 68) Bologna, Italy
- Genres: Cantautore, folk, rock
- Occupations: Singer-songwriter, poet, writer, lyceum teacher
- Instruments: Vocals, Guitar
- Years active: 1972–2018
- Labels: EMI, Ultima Spiaggia
- Website: Claudio Lolli

Claudio Lolli (March 28, 1950 – August 17, 2018) was an Italian singer-songwriter, poet, writer and secondary school teacher.

== Career ==
Claudio Lolli first came to public attention by Francesco Guccini to EMI Italiana, who produced his first LPs from 1972 to 1976. His albums are themed around political issues and ideas. For example, the album Un uomo in crisi follows the events of Antonio Gramsci's life.

Some of his better known songs are "Ho visto anche degli zingari felici", "Aspettando Godot", "Michel", "Quando la morte avrà", "Quanto amore", and "Borghesia".

He started his career as a writer in the early 1980s and wrote five novels. Lolli started writing his first novel, Antipatici antipodi, in 1972, and it was published in 1997.

== Discography ==
Lolli recorded many albums, including:

=== Albums ===
- Aspettando Godot (1972)
- Un uomo in crisi. Canzoni di morte. Canzoni di vita (March 13, 1973)
- Canzoni di rabbia (10/2/1975)
- Ho visto anche degli zingari felici (7/4/1976)
- Disoccupate le strade dai sogni (1977)
- Extranei (April 30, 1980)
- Antipatici antipodi (1/3/1983)
- Claudio Lolli (6/5/1988)
- Nove pezzi facili (1992)
- Intermittenze del cuore (1997)
- Viaggio in Italia (1998)
- Dalla parte del torto (2000)
- La terra, la luna e l'abbondanza [live] (2002)
- Ho visto anche degli zingari felici [live] (4/2003)
- La via del mare [live] (October 29, 2005)
- La scoperta dell'America (7/4/2006)

=== 45 rpm ===
- Aspettando Godot/Michel (9/11/1972)
- Un uomo in crisi/La guerra è finita (May 30, 1973)
- Analfabetizzazione/I giornali di marzo (1977)

=== Anthologies ===
- Piazza... strade... sogni, 1995
- Collezione, February 15, 2001
- Made in Italy, February 25, 2004
- Studio collection, September 23, 2005
- Claudio Lolli: the best of platinum, 9/3/2007

== Bibliography ==
- L'inseguitore Peter H. – Il lavoro editoriale, 1984
- Giochi crudeli – Transeuropa, 1990
- Nei sogni degli altri – Marsilio, 1995
- Antipatici antipodi – 1972–1997, City lights Italia, 1997
- Rumore rosa – Stampa Alternativa, 2004, ISBN 88-7226-827-3
