= Vince Tempera =

Italian musician, composer, record producer and conductor

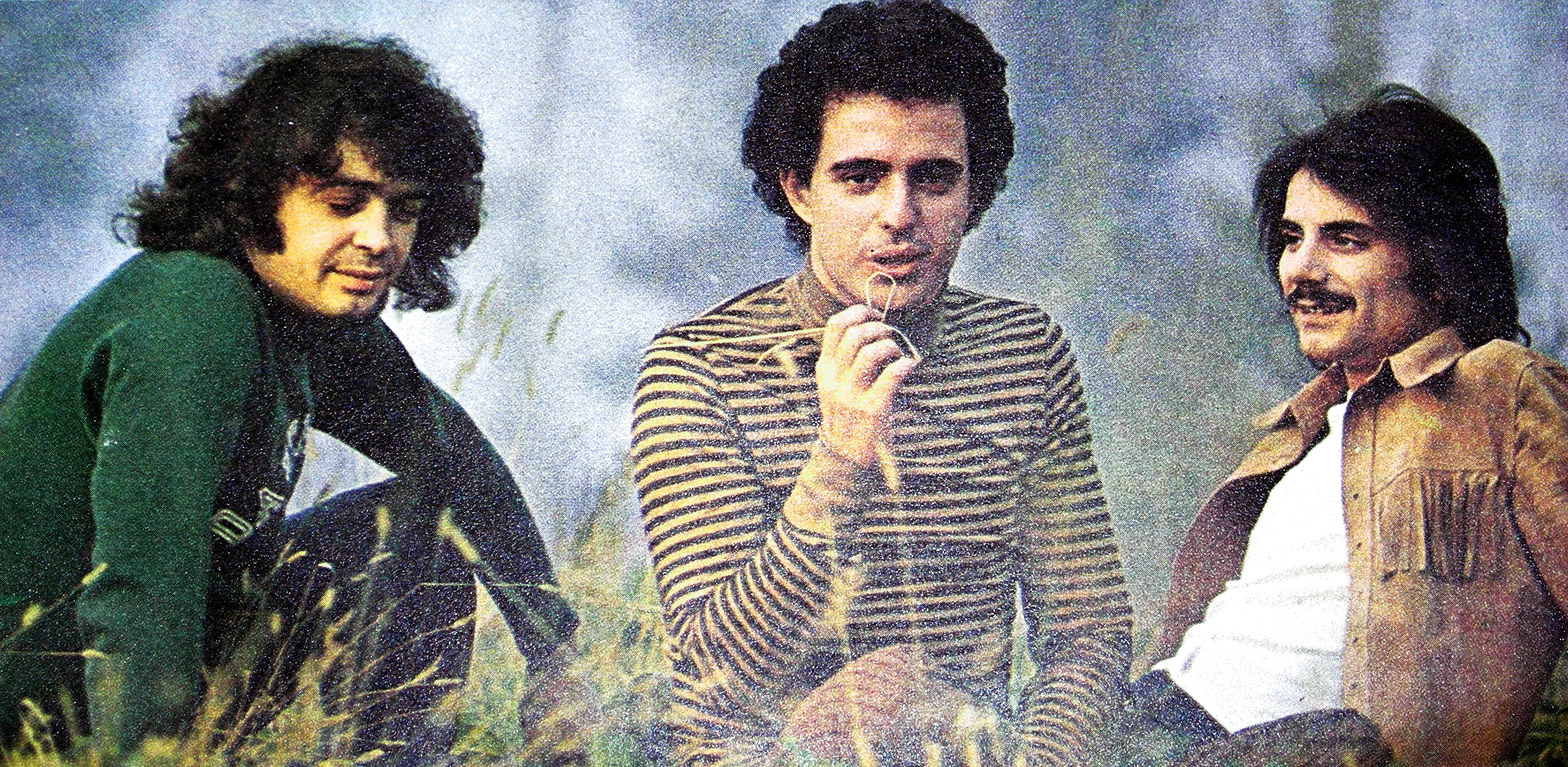

Vince Tempera (born 18 September 1946) is an Italian musician, composer, arranger, record producer and conductor.

Born in Milan as Vincenzo Tempera, he graduated in piano and composition at the Conservatory, then started collaborating with several beat groups such as I Giganti and La Nuova Era. He was later a member of the avant-garde musical project The Pleasure Machine and of the progressive group Il Volo. In late 1970s he achieved a large commercial success as a composer of cartoons' opening songs. He was conductor in many editions of the Sanremo Music Festival and in one edition of the Eurovision Song Contest (for Malta in 1975). He contributed several film scores including the Lucio Fulci films Four of the Apocalypse (1975), Dracula in the Provinces (1975), Sette note in nero (1977), Silver Saddle (1978), Manaos (1979), The House of Clocks (1989) and The Sweet House of Horrors (1989). The main theme from Sette note in nero was later included in the soundtrack of Quentin Tarantino's Kill Bill: Volume 1. His collaborations include, among others, Zucchero Fornaciari, Lucio Battisti, Francesco Guccini, Antonello Venditti, Mina, Nomadi and Angelo Branduardi.

In the 1970s Tempera also recorded under the pseudonym Andrè Carr.
