= Beppe Carletti =

Italian musician

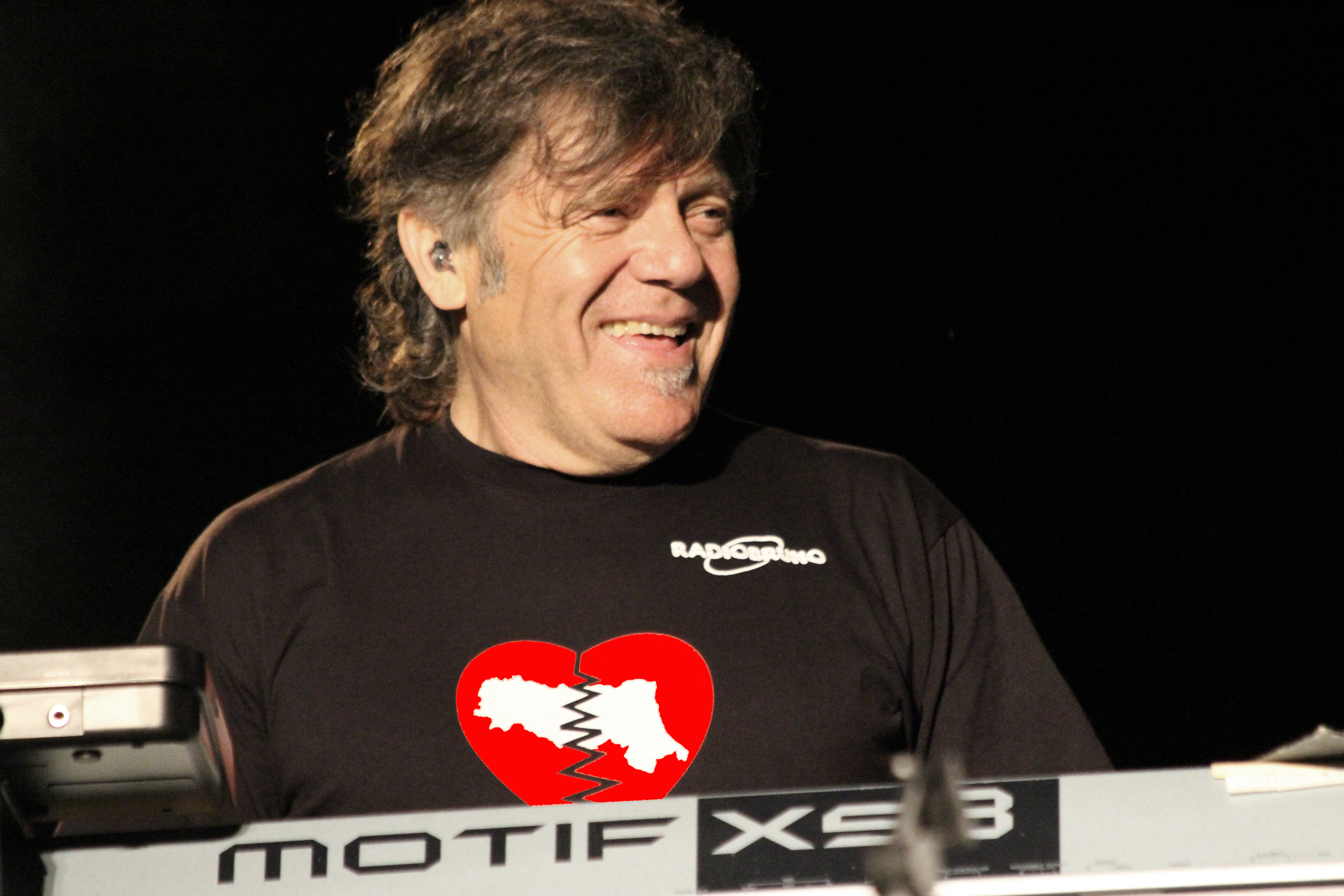
Beppe Carletti, founder, leader and keyboardist of Nomadi, the longest-running Italian musical group

Giuseppe "Beppe" Carletti (born 12 August 1946) is an Italian musician, founder and keyboardist of the band I Nomadi.

== Career ==
Carletti was born in Novi di Modena, Emilia-Romagna.

He founded the Nomadi at the age of sixteen, together with Augusto Daolio, Franco Midili, Leonardo Manfredini, Gualtiero Gelmini and Antonio Campari. After Daolio's death, he remained the sole founder member still active with the band.

Carletti has always distinguished for his humanitarian and social engagement. He founded a hospital in Cambodia and Vietnam where girls victims of slavery were helped.

On 18 February 2005, Daolio's birthday, he was named Knight of Italian Republic by president Carlo Azeglio Ciampi.

== See also ==
- I Nomadi
