= Francesco Guccini =

Italian singer-songwriter (1940–2026)

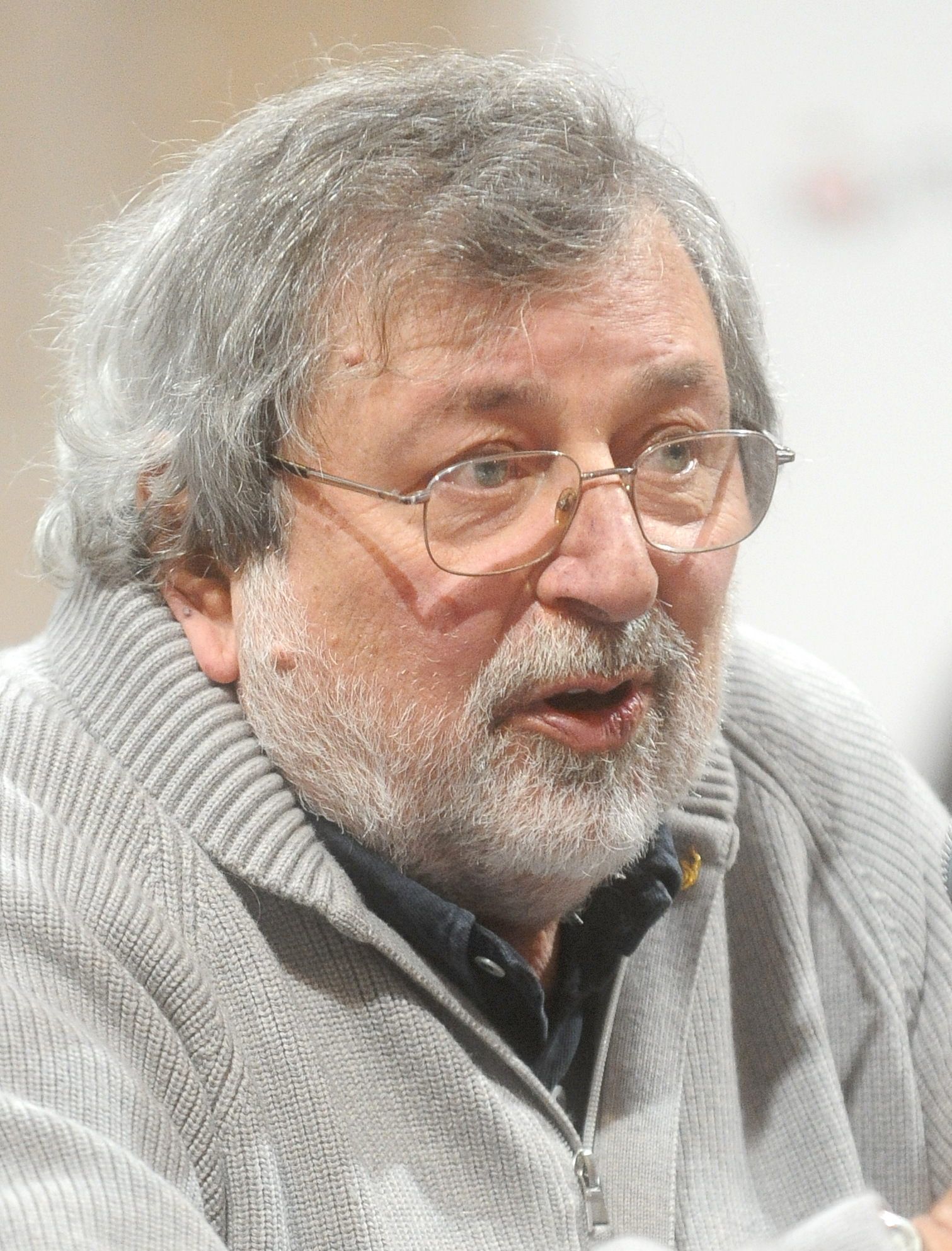
- Guccini in 2016

Background information
- Born: 14 June 1940; Modena, Italy
- Died: 6 August 2026 (aged 86) Sambuca Pistoiese, Italy
- Genre: Folk
- Occupations: Singer-songwriter; writer; actor
- Instrument: Acoustic guitar
- Years active: 1960–2023
- Label: EMI
- Website: francescoguccini.it

Francesco Guccini (Italian: [franˈtʃesko ɡutˈtʃiːni]; 14 June 1940 – 6 August 2026) was an Italian singer-songwriter, writer and occasional actor. During the five decades of his music career he recorded 16 studio albums and collections, and 6 live albums. He was also a writer, having published autobiographic, and hardboiled novels, and a comics writer. Guccini also worked as an actor, soundtrack composer, lexicographerm and dialectologist.

Guccini moved to Pàvana during World War II, then returned to Modena where he spent his teenage years and established his musical career. His debut album, Folk beat n. 1, was released in 1967, but his first success was in 1972 with the album Radici. He was harshly criticised after releasing Stanze di vita quotidiana and answered his critics with the song "L'avvelenata". His studio albums production slowed down in the 1990s and 2000s, but his live performances continued being successful.

His lyrics have been praised for their poetic and literary value and have been used in schools as an example of modern poetry. Guccini gained the appreciation of critics and fans, who regard him as an iconic figure. He has received several awards for his works; an asteroid, a cactus species and a butterfly subspecies have been named after him. The main instrument in most of his songs is the acoustic guitar.

Guccini was a left-wing and anti-fascist intellectual, close in spirit to the communist and socialist traditions of the Italian left but independent from any political party. He supported social justice, workers' rights, secularism, civil liberties, and resistance to authoritarianism. His worldview was shaped by the memory of the Italian Resistance, the post-war left-wing culture of Emilia-Romagna, and the social movements of the late 1960s. His songs often criticised fascism, inequality, hypocrisy, consumerism, and the abuse of power.

== Early life ==
=== Family and education ===
Guccini was born on 14 June 1940 in Modena, Italy. His father from Tuscany, Ferruccio Guccini, was a postal employee, and his mother from Emilia, Ester Prandi, was a housewife. While his father served in the Italian military during World War II, Guccini lived with his grandparents in a small village in the Apennine Mountains in northern Tuscany called Pàvana, where he spent his childhood. His years spent in the somewhat archaic society of the mountains of Central Italy was to be a strong inspiration throughout his career, and it became one of the key recurring themes of his songs and books.

When World War II had ended, Guccini moved back to his family in Modena. He studied at the Istituto Magistrale Carlo Sigonio, the same school Luciano Pavarotti had attended, earning his high school diploma in 1958. Guccini spent his teenage years in Modena, as he later recounted in his second novel Vacca d'un cane and in songs including "Piccola città", which paints a bitter portrait of the city as "a strange enemy". In 1961, the Guccini family moved to Bologna, and he enrolled at the University of Bologna to study foreign languages. The next year, he undertook mandatory military service, an experience he described as "substantially positive". When he returned to Bologna, Guccini was asked to join the band Equipe 84, but he declined to continue his studies. He later quit university just before taking his degree (he was conferred a degree honoris causa in science education in 2002).

=== Musical beginnings ===
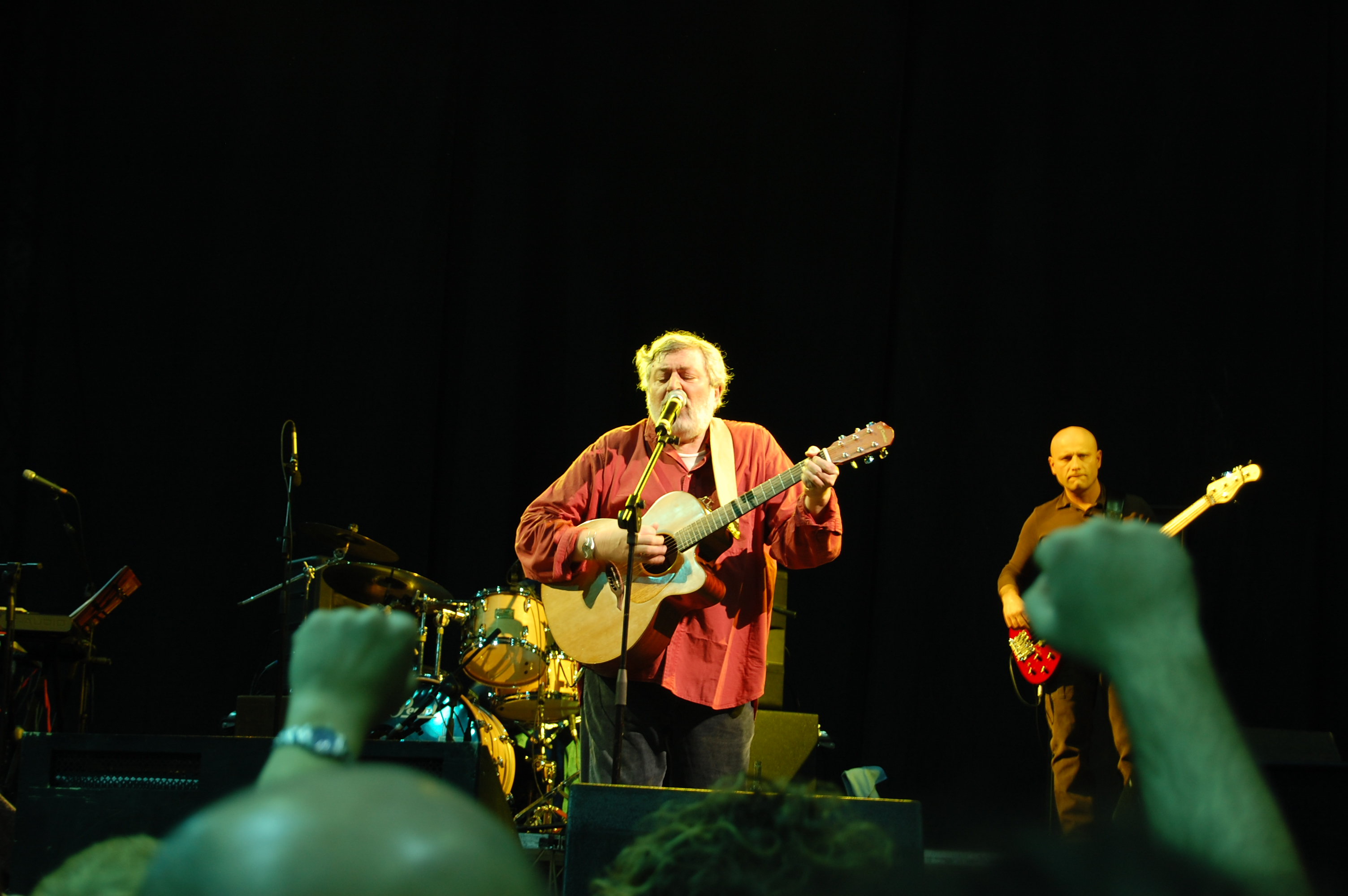
Guccini singing "La locomotiva".

Guccini's first job was as a teacher at a boarding school in Pesaro, but he was fired after a month and a half. He then worked as a journalist at the Gazzetta di Modena for two years. In 1958, Guccini was a guitarist and vocalist in a group first called Hurricanes, then Snakers and finally Gatti. The group included Pier Farri (drums), who would later become Guccini's producer; Victor Sogliani (saxophone), future member of Equipe 84; and Franco Fini Storchi (guitar). Guccini wrote his first songs while in the Snakers, in a style inspired by The Everly Brothers and Peppino di Capri. The group performed for two years, touring around Northern Italy and Switzerland. In April 1960, Guccini interviewed Domenico Modugno, who had just won two consecutive Sanremo Festivals. This inspired Guccini to write "L'antisociale", his first composition as a singer-songwriter. The band Cantacronache was an important influence to Guccini's artistic growth, as was Bob Dylan.

== Career ==
=== 1960s ===
Record producer CGD commissioned Guccini to write a song for the 1967 Sanremo Festival, "Una storia d'amore", to be sung by Caterina Caselli and Gigliola Cinquetti. The song, though, was not selected for the event, and Guccini was embittered by the edits made by two lyricists engaged by CGD. Guccini made his debut as a singer-songwriter in March 1967, with the album Folk beat n. 1, which received little commercial success. Three of the songs recorded for the album had previously been successes for Nomadi and Equipe 84: "Noi non ci saremo", "L'antisociale", and "Auschwitz", the last of which was translated and sung in English by Equipe 84, as well as by Rod MacDonald on his 1994 album Man on the Ledge. Another song from the album, "In morte di S.F.", later renamed "Canzone per un'amica", was recorded by Nomadi in 1968. From 1965 onward, Guccini spent 20 years teaching Italian at the off-campus Dickinson College, in Bologna.

In May 1967, Guccini made his first appearance on television, on Diamoci del tu, hosted by Caterina Caselli and Giorgio Gaber singing "Auschwitz". He wrote several songs for Caselli and for Nomadi, who made his song "Dio è morto" become widely popular; it became one of his most famous songs, despite being censored by the RAI for blasphemy. In 1968 Guccini translated Simon & Garfunkel's hit song "Mrs. Robinson" into Italian; it was first covered in this version by the Italian beat group I Royals and later was recorded by Bobby Solo on his LP Bobby Folk in 1970. In 1968 the 45 rpm record Un altro giorno è andato/Il bello was released; Guccini re-recorded the Side A song in an acoustic version for his 1970 album L'isola non-trovata. His first concert was held the same year at the La Cittadella Cultural Centre in Assisi.

=== 1970s ===
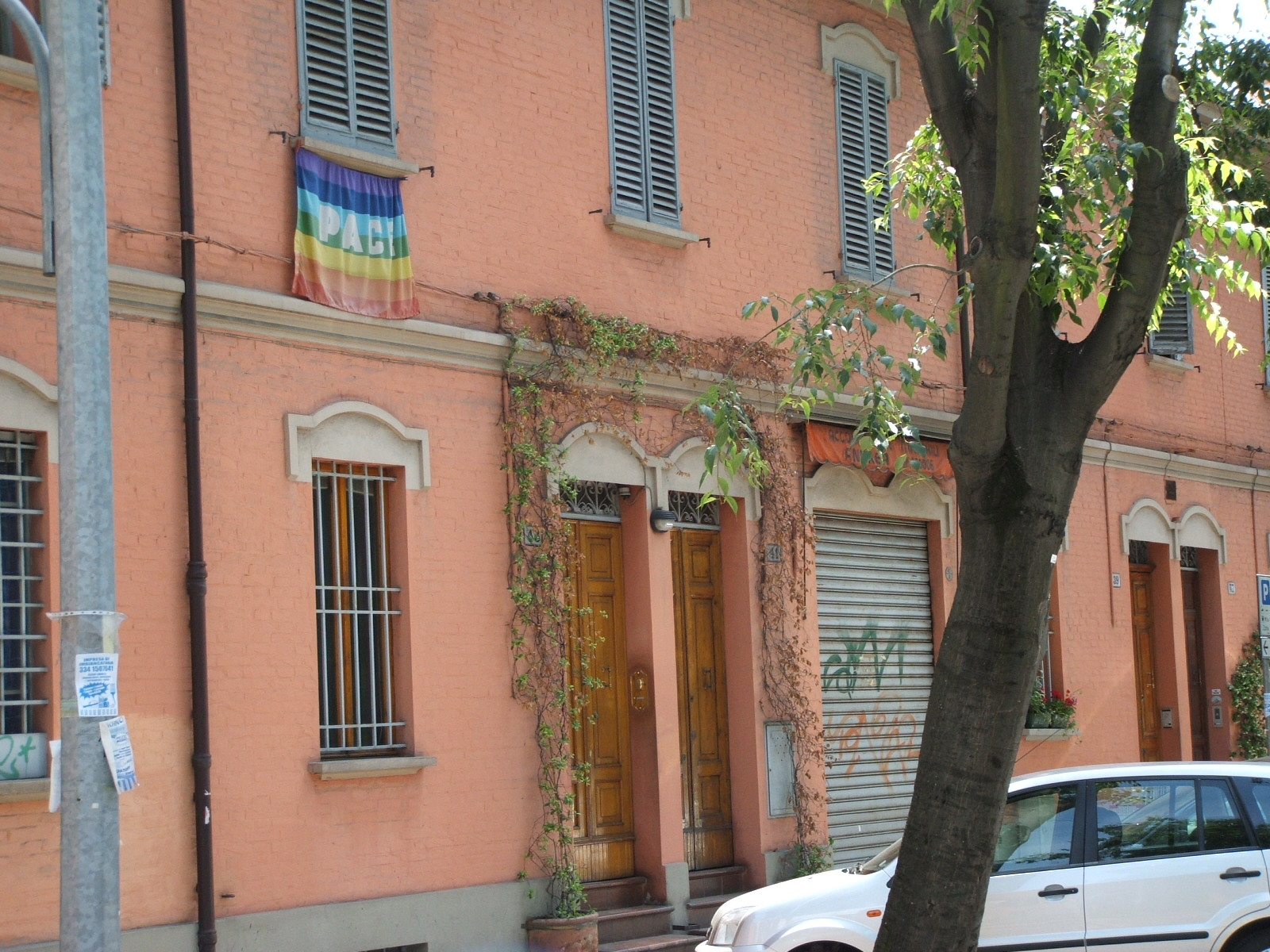
Via Paolo Fabbri 43, the address in Bologna after which Guccini's album is named.

In 1970, Guccini released his second album, Due anni dopo, recorded in the autumn of 1969. The main themes of the album are the passage of time and the analysis of everyday life in the context of bourgeois hypocrisy, with a noticeable influence from French music, as well as from Giacomo Leopardi's poetic style. After this album Guccini started his 10-year-long collaboration with folksinger Deborah Kooperman, who played fingerstyle guitar on it, a style mostly unknown in Italy at the time. Eleven months after Due anni dopo, the album L'isola non trovata was released. The title was a literary reference to Guido Gozzano, and the song "La collina" contained a reference to J. D. Salinger. Guccini's fame began to spread beyond Bologna, partly thanks to the appearance on the TV show Speciale tre milioni, where he sang some of his songs and befriended Claudio Baglioni.

The turning point in Guccini's career was in 1972 thanks to the album Radici (roots), about the perpetual search for one's origins. This was also conveyed by the image on the front cover of the album, portraying Guccini's grandparents and their siblings next to their old mountain home. Radici contains some of his most renowned and popular songs, such as "Incontro", "Piccola Città", "Il vecchio e il bambino", "La Canzone della bambina portoghese", "Canzone dei dodici mesi", and "La locomotiva", based on a real event and dealing with themes of equality, social justice, and freedom, with a style similar to the anarchist music of the end of the 19th century.

Also in 1972, Guccini brought Claudio Lolli, a young singer-songwriter, to his record label, EMI Italiana. He later wrote two songs with him, "Keaton" and "Ballando con una sconosciuta". In 1973, Guccini released Opera buffa, a light-hearted and playful album, which showed his skills as an ironic, theatrical, and cultured cabaret artist. Guccini was perplexed by the release of the disc, especially because of its arrangements and because it was recorded live (with overdubs made in a recording studio). One year later Stanze di vita quotidiana was released, with a mixed reception by fans and critics. It included six long and melancholic songs, a mirror of the crisis Guccini faced, worsened by constant disagreements with his producer Pier Farri. Guccini received criticism, including a slating by the critic Riccardo Bertoncelli, who said the singer songwriter was "a finished artist, who has nothing else to say". Guccini answered with the song "L'avvelenata", a few years later.

Guccini had his first commercial success in 1976, with Via Paolo Fabbri 43, which was the sixth best-selling album of the year. It was named after the address of the house in Bologna where he lived. He sang with a more mature and determined voice, and the musical structure was more complex than in his earlier works. The album contained "L'avvelenata", a bitter and colourful reply to the criticism he received for Stanze di vita quotidiana, which cited one of his critics, Riccardo Bertoncelli. Later Guccini was reluctant in performing the song during concerts, saying it was obsolete.

"Amerigo"
Guccini said about "Amerigo": "It is the most complete, refined, rich of themes, and maybe most beautiful song I've ever written."

The title track was an abstract description of Guccini's life in Bologna, which references both Jorge Luis Borges and Roland Barthes; it also mentioned the "three heroines of Italian song", Alice, Marinella, and Lilly, three women from songs by Italian singer-songwriters Francesco De Gregori, Fabrizio De André, and Antonello Venditti. Other notable tracks on the album are "Canzone quasi d'Amore", characterised by existential poetry, and "Il pensionato", about an old neighbour of Guccini, focusing on the sad psychological situation of some old people. Guccini's next album, Amerigo was released in 1978. The most popular song was "Eskimo", but Guccini claimed the highest point was the title track, a ballad about an emigrant uncle of his.

In 1977, the weekly magazine Grand Hotel featured Guccini on the cover titled "The father every teenager would have liked to have". Guccini did not endorse the article, which was based on an interview he did not know would be published, and commented: "I cannot understand how they chose that title, I write songs for an audience of people in their thirties, I do not see how an audience of sixteen year olds fresh out of school could relate with the things I say." In the same year, Guccini separated from his wife Roberta (the song "Eskimo" is about this event), and started co-habitating with Angela. In 1978 they had a daughter, Teresa, to whom the songs "Culodritto" and "E un giorno..." are dedicated. In 1979, the live album Album concerto, recorded in a concert with Nomadi, was released. It was considered by some peculiar then, because, the songs were performed in duet with Augusto Daolio, and because it includes the previously unreleased songs: "Dio è morto", "Noi", and "Per fare un uomo".

=== 1980s ===
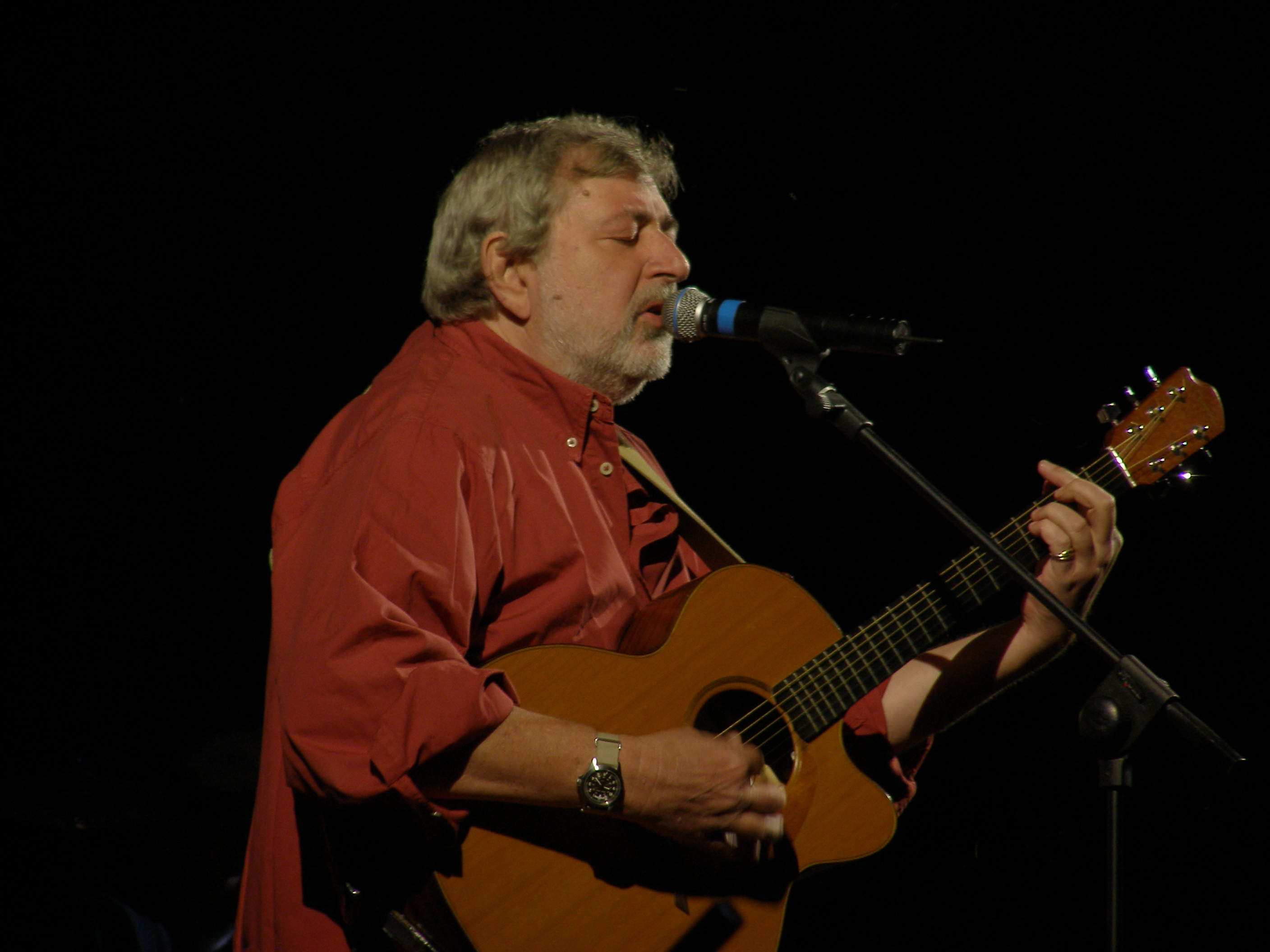
Guccini on stage

The first album released by Guccini in the eighties was Metropolis, which was characterised by the description of cities with a symbolic value: Byzantium, Venice, Bologna and Milan. Their histories mingle with the distress caused by life in the city and with symbolic references. The album had comparatively richer arrangements than other Guccini lps past, with saxophones, bass guitars, drums, clarinets, flutes, and zuffolo. Byzantium wss described by Guccini as a fascinating yet oppressive city at the crossroads of two continents and two eras. The song is set at the time of Emperor Justinian I (483–565), and there are many historical references to that period, that were explained by Guccini himself. The narrator, Filemazio, who some critics believe to be a fictionalized Guccini, senses the decadence of his civilization and the coming of the end. The song was praised by critic Paolo Jachia, who described it as "moving and dreamlike".

In 1981, Guccini was the co-author, along with Giorgio Gaber, Sandro Luporini, and Gian Piero Alloisio, of the musical Gli ultimi viaggi di Gulliver. The eponymous song "Gulliver" was then included in Guccini's next album, Guccini, which dealt with the same themes found in Metropolis. Songs on the album include "Shomèr ma mi llailah?" ("Watchman, what of the night?", from Isaiah 21:11), "Autogrill", about a love only dreamt of, and "Inutile", which narrates a day two lovers spent in Rimini. The subsequent tour was the first in which Guccini performed with a backing band; previously, Guccini used to perform solo, or with just one or two guitarists. In 1984 the live album Fra la via Emilia e il West was released. It included live versions of many of his popular songs, recorded mainly at a concert held in the Piazza Maggiore in Bologna, in which several guests performed alongside Guccini: Giorgio Gaber, Paolo Conte, I Nomadi, Roberto Vecchioni, and Equipe 84.

In 1987, the album Signora Bovary was released. Several of the songs portray people from Guccini's life: "Van Loon" is his father, "Culodritto" is his daughter Teresa, and "Signora Bovary" is himself. Other songs include "Keaton", written with his friend Claudio Lolli, and "Scirocco", an award-winning song about an episode in the life of the poet Adriano Spatola, a friend of Guccini. In 1988 the singer-songwriter released a live album, ...quasi come Dumas..., which includes some of his songs from the nineteen Sixties, in a rearranged version. The title is a homage to Twenty Years After, the novel by Alexandre Dumas.

=== 1990s ===
In 1990 Guccini released Quello che non..., which continued in the style of Signora Bovary. Among the songs included on the album are "Quello che non" and "La canzone delle domande consuete", which received the Club Tenco best song of the year award. Three years later, he released Parnassius Guccinii referencing a subspecies of butterfly which was named in his honour. The song "Farewell", included on the album, is a homage to Bob Dylan's "Farewell, Angelina", featuring its instrumental introduction and citing a verse ("The triangle tingles, and the trumpet plays slow"). The literary critic Paolo Jachia commented: "Guccini's enormous poetic and cultural effort has been opening the best tradition of Italian poetry to Dylan-esque ballads." Other songs included on the album are "Canzone per Silvia", dedicated to Silvia Baraldini, and "Acque", composed for Tiziano Sclavi's movie Nero. It was three years until he released his next album, D'amore di morte e di altre sciocchezze, which achieved significant commercial success. Tracks included are "Cirano", inspired by the play Cyrano de Bergerac; "Quattro stracci", about the ending of the relationship with Angela (the same woman to whom Farewell was dedicated); "Stelle" about the feelings of powerlessness men feel when looking at the starry night sky; "Vorrei", dedicated to his new partner, Raffaella Zuccari, and "I Fichi", a farcical song.

=== 2000s ===
Stagioni was Guccini's first album of the 2000s. The key theme is the passage of time and the different temporal cycles connected to it. Songs included are "Autunno", "Ho ancora la forza" (with Ligabue), "Don Chisciotte", in which Guccini takes the role of Don Quixote, and his guitarist that of Sancho Panza), and "Addio", a song akin to "L'avvelenata". The album and its tour were successful, with the unexpected presence of many young people among the audience, establishing Guccini as an iconic artist for three generations. A special limited edition vinyl version of Stagioni was also released.

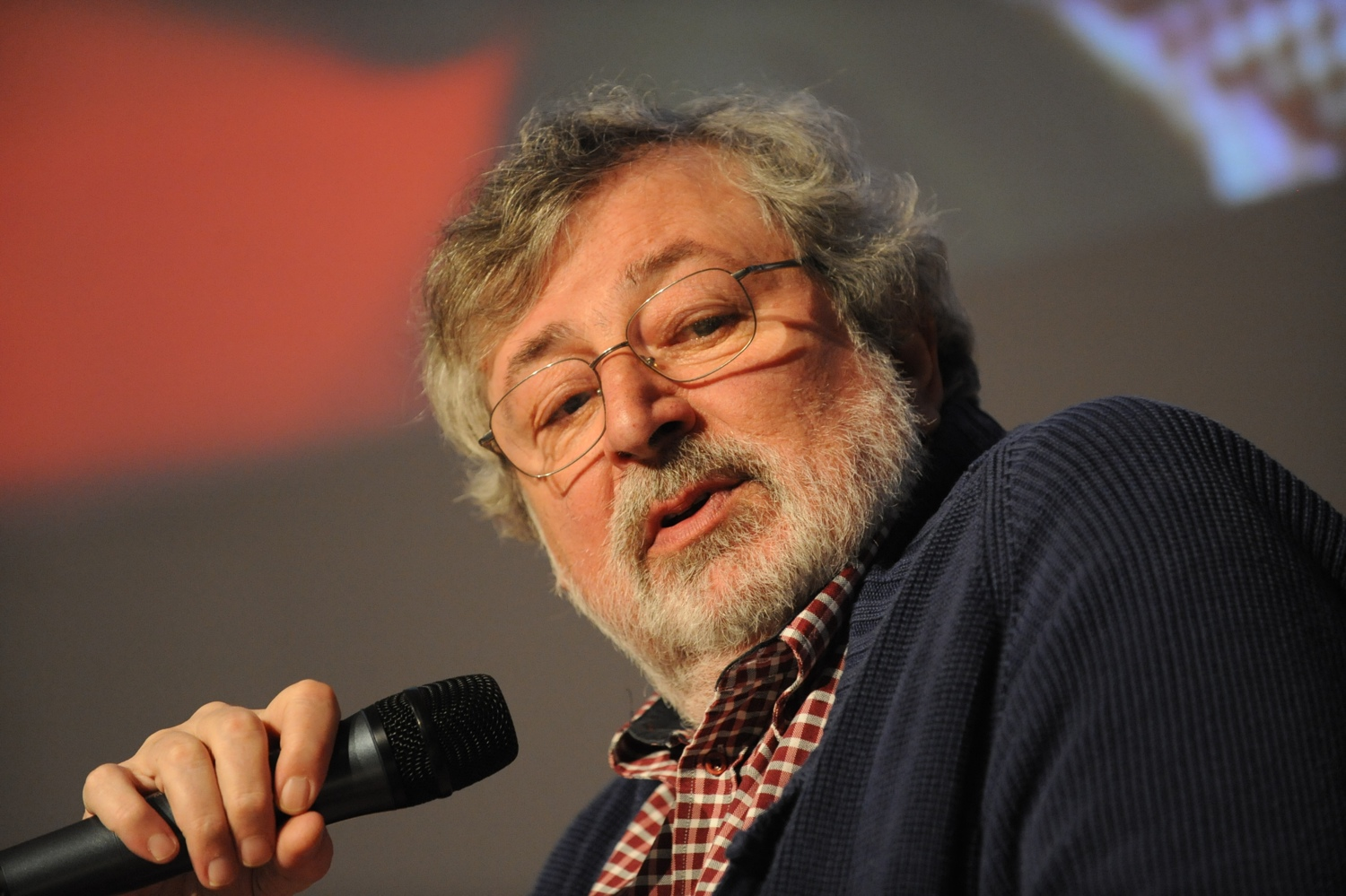
Guccini in 2013

In 2004, Guccini released Ritratti. Some of the songs contained on the album are imagined dialogues with historical figures, such as Odysseus, Christopher Columbus, and Che Guevara. The first track of the album, "Odysseus", is on the theme of travel, and contains references to the Odyssey, to Dante (Canto 26 of Inferno), and to a poem by Foscolo. Another song on the album, "Piazza Alimonda", is about the death of Carlo Giuliani during the demonstrations at the G8 summit in Genoa. Ritratti received critical acclaim and commercial success, reaching the number one spot on the FIMI Albums Chart, holding it for two weeks, and remaining on the chart for eighteen weeks. In the same year, lyrics from "Canzone per Piero" were included in a final upper secondary school exam"; Guccini claimed he was "embarrassed and glad" about being alongside Cicero and Raphael.

In 2005, the live double-album Anfiteatro Live, recorded in the amphitheatre in Cagliari, was released; it also included a DVD of the concert. Anfiteatro Live was a commercial success, holding the number one spot on the FIMI Chart for one month, and remaining on the chart for twenty-two weeks. In 2006 Guccini received one vote in the 2006 Italian presidential election. The same year, the triple-album The Platinum Collection, containing 47 songs, was released as a celebration of his fortieth year as a musical artist. In October Guccini's official biography, Portavo allora un Eskimo innocente by Massimo Cotto, was published.

On 21 April 2008, an article on La Stampa affirmed that Guccini had stopped smoking, and that this had caused him to gain weight and lose his inspiration. He denied it on 18 May 2008, in TV show Che tempo che fa. In 2010 the Mondadori published Non so che viso avesse, a book which contains a Guccini autobiography and, in the second part of the book, a critical essay edited by Alberto Bertoni. Luciano Ligabue, a friend and colleague of Guccini, composed for him a song titled "Caro il mio Francesco" on his album Arrivederci, mostro!. On 28 September 2010 the collection Storia di altre storie was released, with songs selected by Guccini himself. In the same year the botanist Davide Donati named a new species of Mexican cactus, the Corynopuntia guccinii, after him. In the article about the discovery in the botanical magazine Piante Grasse, Donati explained that he discovered the unknown plant whilst listening to Guccini's "Incontro", adding, "I could not have named it after anyone else."

== Artistry ==
=== Style ===
Guccini is the voice of what was once called the "social movement". Now it's simply a voice of truth, of rock-like coherence with its own language and thoughts. In his works there's a never-ending discourse about irony, friendship and solidarity.

— Dario Fo

Guccini's lyrical and poetic style has been praised by many, including famous authors and singer-songwriters. Fellow singer-songwriter Roberto Vecchioni said about Guccini: "he's not a singer of stories, he's a singer of thoughts and a singer of doubts", while Nobel Prize winner Dario Fo called him a "voice of truth". Throughout his lengthy career, some defining characteristics stand out in his work, such as the use of different registers, the literary references to several writers, and the use of a variety of themes to reach moral conclusions. His lyrics frequently have a metaphysical tone and existential motifs, and are often centered around portrayals of people and events. Guccini's voice is baritonal, with a noticeable rhotacism. Most of his songs, especially early in his career, are folk rock.

Guccini has been seen as having been a sociopolitical chronicler and some of his songs express his opinion about a political issue. In "La primavera di Praga", he expressed criticism of the Sovietic occupation of Czechoslovakia in 1968, and "Piccola storia ignobile" supported the Italian abortion law. "Canzone per Silvia" is dedicated to Silvia Baraldini, and both "Canzone per il Che" and "Stagioni" are dedicated to Che Guevara. "Piazza Alimonda"is about the riots at the Genoa G8 summit and "La locomotiva" is about the anarchist Pietro Rigosi running a locomotive at full steam towards death.

A leftist, although not a communist, Guccini dealt with political issues and more generally with the political climate of his time in some songs, such as "La locomotiva" or "Eskimo". While often seen as a communist and having communist friends, Guccini defined himself as an anarchist, saying that he was an Italian Socialist Party voter and that Stalinism "could not appeal to someone like me: a libertarian, a member of the Action Party", and that his heroes were the Rosselli brothers (Carlo Rosselli and Nello Rosselli) and Duccio Galimberti. Guccini expressed his thoughts about the relation between music and politics in his song "L'avvelenata", and explained "I have never said that with songs you can make revolutions, nor that you can make poetry" ("però non ho mai detto che a canzoni si fan rivoluzioni, si possa far poesia").

=== Books ===
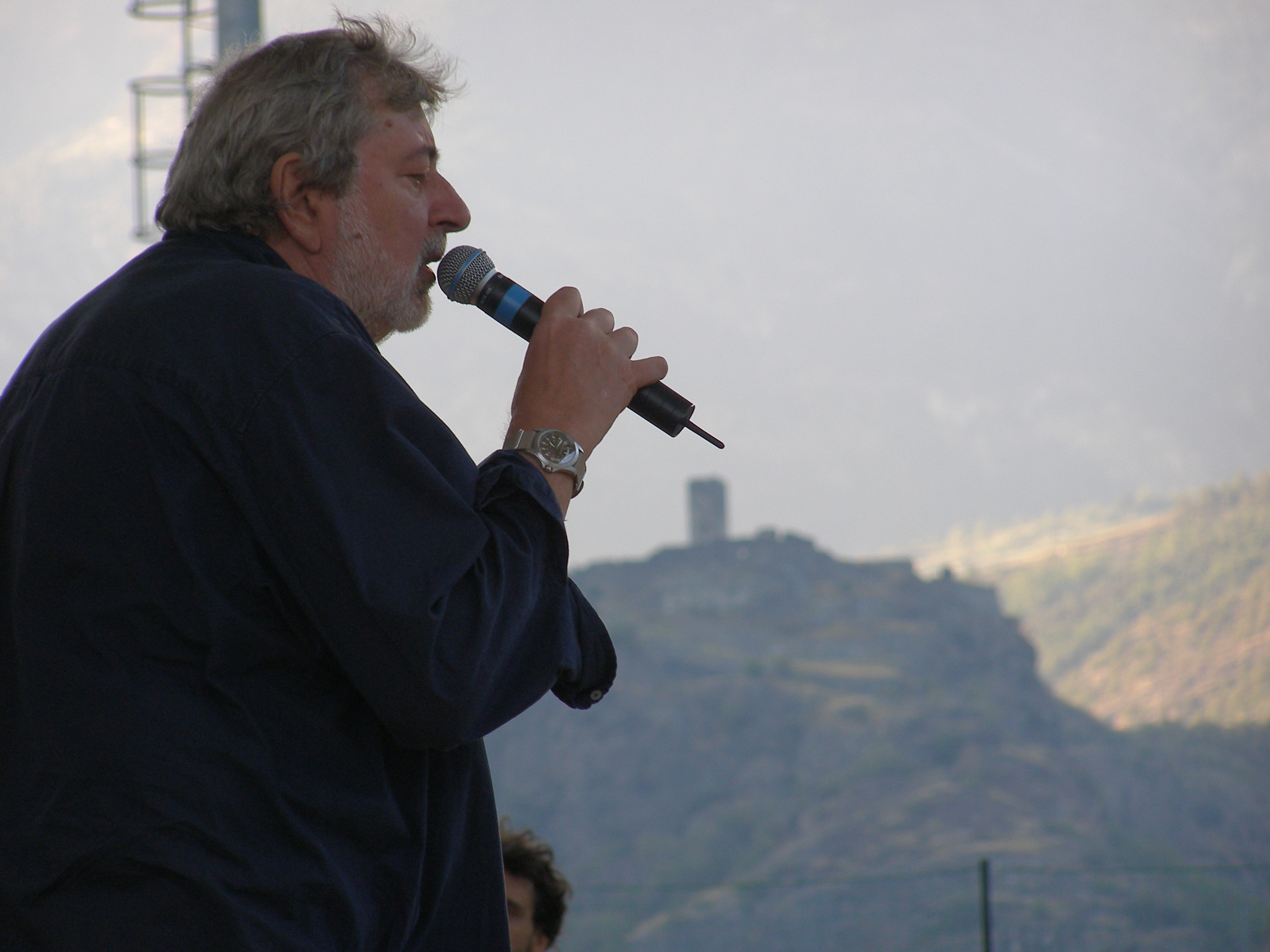
Guccini in 2006

During his career as a writer, Guccini published several novels and essays, experimenting with different genres. His first novel, Cròniche Epafàniche, was published by Feltrinelli in 1989, and was one of his most successful works. Although it is not explicitly an autobiography, it can be considered the first of three autobiographical books. It describes past events of Pàvana, the town where he spent his childhood. Guccini recounted stories he heard from elderly people living on the Tuscan Apennines; critics praised the "philological accuracy" of the book.

His next two novels, Vacca d'un cane and Cittanòva blues were also bestsellers, and covered different periods of his life. Vacca d'un cane depicts a teenage Guccini in Modena, as he realized that the city's provincialism will be an obstacle to his intellectual growth, while Cittanòva Blues the last part of his trio of autobiographical books, tells of his time in Bologna, seen as a "little Paris".

Guccini collaborated with Loriano Macchiavelli for a series of hardboiled books, and published a Dictionary of the dialect of Pàvana, which showed his ability as dialectologist and translator. Guccini has also worked as a comics writer. He was a lover of comics, and some of his songs reference them. He is the author and script writer of comics, such as Vita e morte del brigante Bobini detto "Gnicche", illustrated by Francesco Rubino, Lo sconosciuto, illustrated by Magnus, and Cronache dello spazio profondo, drawn by his friend Bonvi.

=== Cinema ===
Guccini's first experience as an actor was in the 1976 movie Fantasia, ma non troppo, per violino, directed by Gianfranco Mingozzi, in which he played Giulio Cesare Croce, a poet who narrates the history of Bologna. He then appeared in I giorni cantati, a 1979 movie directed by Paolo Pietrangeli, which featured two of Guccini's songs on its soundtrack, "Eskimo" and "Canzone di notte n°2"; Musica per vecchi animali, a 1989 movie directed by Umberto Angelucci and Stefano Benni; Radiofreccia, the 1998 directorial debut of singer-songwriter Luciano Ligabue; and Ormai è fatta, the 1999 movie directed by Enzo Monteleone. In the 2000s, he acted in three movies directed by Leonardo Pieraccioni: Ti amo in tutte le lingue del mondo (2005), Una moglie bellissima (2007), and Io & Marilyn (2009). Guccini wrote the soundtrack of the 1977 movie Nenè, directed by Salvatore Samperi, and his song "Acque" featured in the soundtrack of Nero, the 1992 movie directed by Giancarlo Soldi.

== Personal life and death ==
In 1971, Guccini married his long-time girlfriend Roberta Baccilieri, who is pictured on the back cover of what was his next album. On 25 April 2011, he married for the second time, this time to Raffaella Zuccari, who had been his partner for the last fifteen years. Guccini had a lifelong dedication to cats, a passion that deeply influenced his personal life and artistic work. A self-described gattaro, he maintained a close bond with felines from his upbringing in Pàvana through his later years in the Apennines, frequently advocating for animal welfare.

Guccini maintained a detached, often ironic view of association football, citing early boredom and missing the 1963–64 Serie A win of Bologna due to his university studies. Despite his initial indifference, he developed a later-life support for Juventus, driven primarily by his deep admiration for the elegance of French midfielder Michel Platini. His perspective had also shifted during the 1982 FIFA World Cup, an event dominated by a core group of Juventus players representing the winning Italy national football team. In addition to his support for the Bianconeri, Guccini maintained a regional affection for Pistoiese, and he frequently discussed the sport with friends like former Juventus manager Maurizio Sarri. His connection to Juventus remained prominent throughout his later years, culminating in a widely reported tavern meeting in Pàvana with the then young Juventus midfielder Hans Nicolussi Caviglia.

On 6 August 2026, Guccini died at his home in Pàvana at the age of 86. Widely seen by the public as an icon, he has been homaged as "the storyteller of everyday life".

== Awards ==
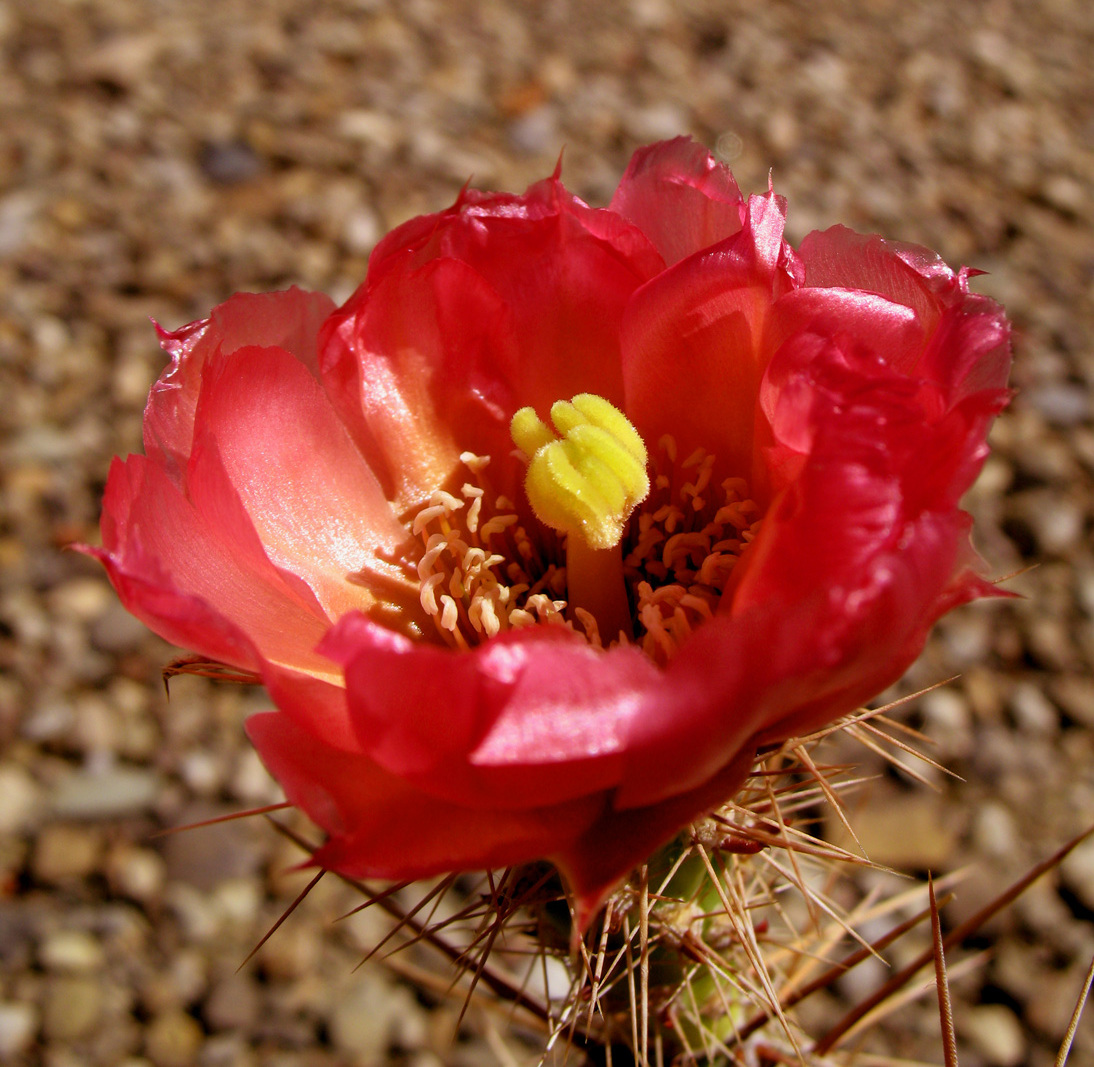
The Corynopuntia guccinii flower

Awards, accolades, and recognitions received by Guccini:

- In 1992, he received the Librex Montale Award "Poetry for Music", for the song "Canzone delle domande consuete".
- In 1992, new subspecies of butterfly on the Tuscan-Emilian Apennines, was named Parnassius mnemosyne guccinii in his honor.
- In 1997, Luciano Tesi and Gabriele Cattani discovered an asteroid, naming it 39748 Guccini.
- In 2001, his story "La Cena" was included in the anthology "Racconti italiani del Novecento" (I Meridiani – Mondadori).
- In 2002, the universities of Bologna, Modena and Reggio Emilia awarded him an honorary degree in Science of Education.
- In 2003, the comune (municipality) of Carpi celebrated Guccini's fortieth year of career dedicating him the show "Stagioni di vita quotidiana".
- In 2004, Carlo Azeglio Ciampi awarded him the title of Officer of the Order of Merit of the Italian Republic.
- Also in 2004, he received the Targa Ferré, the award named after Léo Ferré.
- In 2005, he received the award "Giuseppe Giacosa – Parole per la musica".
- In 2007, in Catanzaro, he was awarded the "Riccio d'argento" for Best Singer-Songwriter Live Album.
- In 2008, in Carpi, he received the Arturo Loria award for his book of short stories Icaro.
- In 2010, the botanist Davide Donati discovered a new species of cactus, naming it Corynopuntia guccinii.
- In 2012, he was awarded with an honorary degree by the American University of Rome.

From the Club Tenco:

- 1975 – Premio Tenco, career award along with Fausto Amodei, Umberto Bindi, Fabrizio De André, Vinicius de Moraes, Enzo Jannacci.
- 1987 – Targa Tenco for the song "Scirocco".
- 1990 – Targa Tenco for the song "La canzone delle domande consuete".
- 1994 – Targa Tenco for the album Parnassius Guccinii.
- 2000 – Targa Tenco for the song "Ho ancora la forza".

Awards won in collaboration with Loriano Macchiavelli:

- In 1997, Guccini and Macchiavelli received the Alassio Literary Award, Un libro per l'Europa, for the book Macaronì: romanzo di santi e delinquenti.
- In 1998, Guccini and Macchiavelli won the 4th annual "Police Film Festival" in Bologna for the book Macaronì: romanzo di santi e delinquenti.
- In 2007, Guccini and Macchiavelli won an award at the "Serravalle Noir 2007" for their novel Tango e gli altri – romanzo di una raffica, anzi tre.

== Discography ==
- 1967 – Folk beat n. 1
- 1970 – Due anni dopo
- 1970 – L'isola non trovata
- 1972 – Radici
- 1973 – Opera buffa
- 1974 – Stanze di vita quotidiana
- 1976 – Via Paolo Fabbri 43
- 1978 – Amerigo
- 1979 – Album concerto (live with Nomadi)
- 1981 – Metropolis
- 1983 – Guccini
- 1984 – Fra la via Emilia e il West (live)
- 1987 – Signora Bovary
- 1988 – ...quasi come Dumas... (live)
- 1990 – Quello che non...
- 1993 – Parnassius Guccinii
- 1996 – D'amore di morte e di altre sciocchezze
- 1998 – Guccini Live Collection (live)
- 2000 – Stagioni
- 2001 – Francesco Guccini Live @ RTSI (live)
- 2004 – Ritratti
- 2005 – Anfiteatro Live (live)
- 2006 – The Platinum Collection
- 2010 – Storia di altre storie
- 2012 – L'ultima Thule
- 2015 – Se io avessi previsto tutto questo... La strada, gli amici, le canzoni
- 2017 – L'ostaria delle dame
- 2019 – Note di viaggio

== Books ==
- Cròniche epafàniche (1991)
- Al Fatâz di Zardén Margarétta (1992)
- Vacca d'un cane (1993)
- Storie d'inverno (1994, with Giorgio Celli and Valerio Manfredi)
- Novecento e Novecento (1995)
- Le parole del mugnaio a Pàvana e nella montagna fra Bologna e Pistoia (1995)
- Macaronì (1998, with Loriano Macchiavelli)
- Dizionario del dialetto di Pàvana
- Un disco dei Platters (1999, with Loriano Macchiavelli)
- Questo sangue che impasta la terra (2001, with Loriano Macchiavelli)
- Storia di altre storie (2001, with Vincenzo Cerami)
- Lo spirito e altri briganti (2002, with Loriano Macchiavelli)
- Cittanòva blues (2003)
- La legge del bar e altre comiche (2005)
- L'uomo che reggeva il cielo (2005)
- Tango e gli altri, romanzo di una raffica anzi tre (2007, with Loriano Macchiavelli)
- Icaro (2008)
- Non so che viso avesse (2008)
- Malastagione (2011, with Loriano Macchiavelli)

== Comics ==
- Storie dello spazio profondo (1975, with Bonvi)
- Poche ore all'alba (1975, with Magnus)
- Vita e morte del brigante Bobino detto Gnicche (1980, with Francesco Rubino)
- Barbùn vs. Realtà (1981, with Filippo Scozzari)
- Gerry Pompa (1983, with Massimo Cavezzali)

== Filmography ==
- Bologna. Fantasia, ma non-troppo, per violino (1976, actor)
- Nenè (1977, soundtrack)
- I giorni cantati (1979, actor as himself and soundtrack)
- Le lunghe ombre (1987, actor)
- Musica per vecchi animali (1989, actor)
- Nero (1992, soundtrack)
- Radiofreccia (1998, actor)
- Ormai è fatta (1999, actor)
- Il segreto del successo (1999, actor as himself)
- I Love You in Every Language in the World (2006, actor)
- A Beautiful Wife (2007, actor)
- Me and Marilyn (2009, actor)
