= Ellade Bandini =

Italian drummer

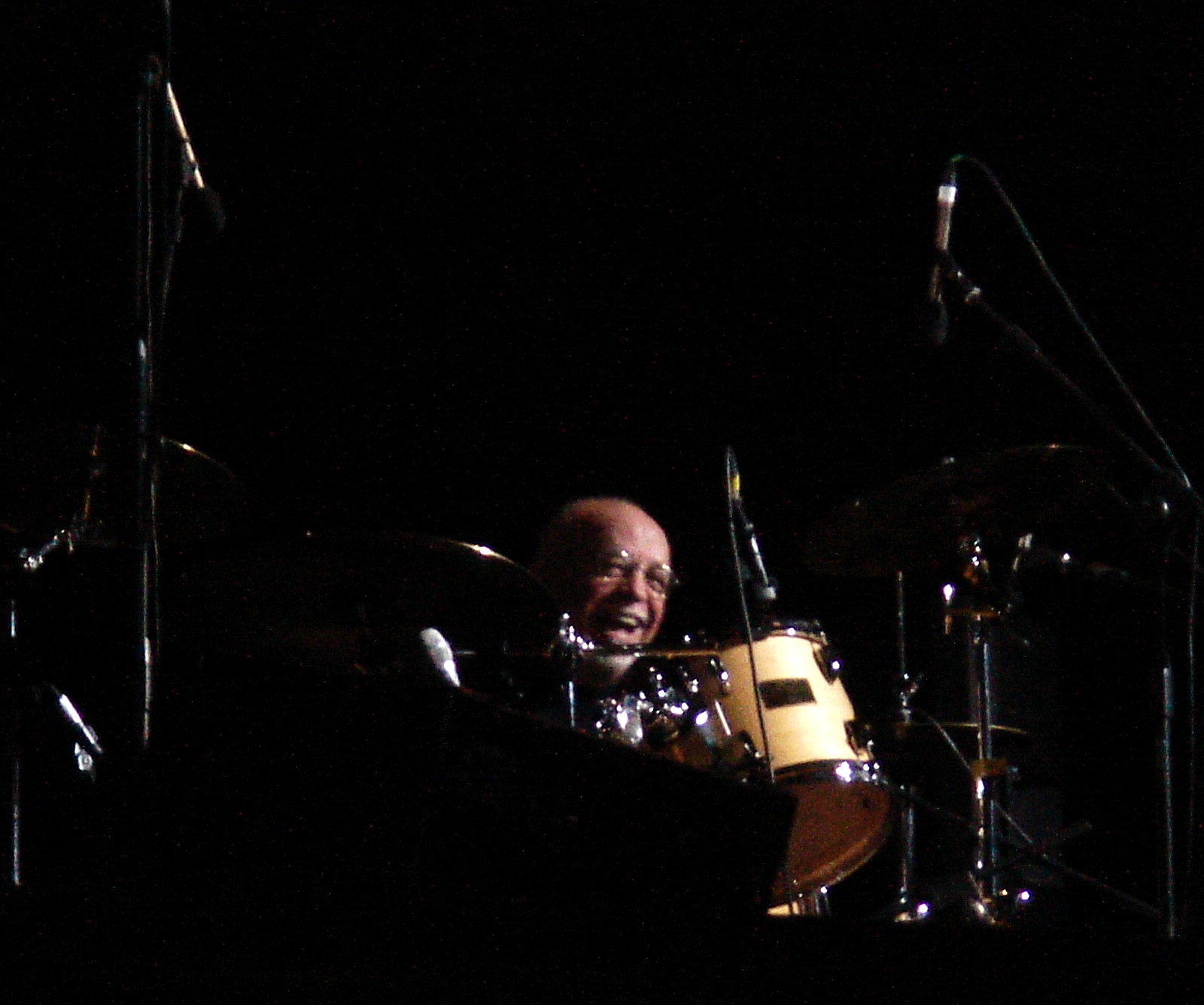

Background information
- Origin: Ferrara, Italy
- Genres: Pop, Jazz
- Occupation: Drummer
- Instrument: Drums

Ellade Bandini (born 17 July 1946, Ferrara, Italy) is an Italian drummer.

Bandini started his prolific career at the young age of 17. Among his notable collaborations in pop music and jazz are Francesco Guccini, Fabrizio De André, Paolo Conte, Mina, Angelo Branduardi, Zucchero Fornaciari, Bruno Lauzi, Roberto Vecchioni, Fabio Concato, Edoardo Bennato, Stephen Schlaks, Vince Tempera, Ares Tavolazzi, Pino Presti, Franco Cerri, Bruno De Filippi, Henghel Gualdi, Tony Scott, Gianni Basso, Mike Melillo, Antonello Salis, Paolo Fresu, Flavio Boltro, Dado Moroni, Danilo Rea and others.

== Discography (selected) ==
=== Albums ===
(as sideman)

- Francesco Guccini – L'Isola Non Trovata (1970)

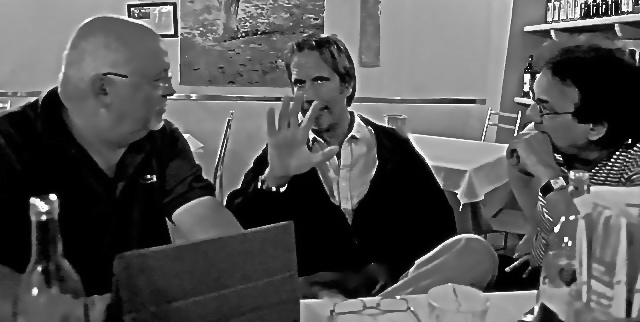
Bandini with Pino Presti and Tullio De Piscopo at Italian Music Festival "Percfest" in Laigueglia in 2015

- The Pleasure Machine – Asia / Amici (Friends) (1971)
- Antonello Venditti – L'Orso Bruno (1973)
- Francesco Guccini – Stanze Di Vita Quotidiana (1974)
- Pino Presti - 1st Round (1976)
- Francesco Guccini – Via Paolo Fabbri 43 (1976)
- Stephen Schlaks – Dream With Steven Schlaks (1976)
- Francesco Guccini – Amerigo (1978)
- Fabio Concato – Svendita Totale 1978)
- Stephen Schlaks – Sensitive And Delicate (1979)
- Fabio Concato – Zio Tom (1979)
- Vince Tempera – Strike Up The Band (1980)
- Edoardo Bennato – Sono Solo Canzonette 1980)
- Stephen Schlaks – Pleasure (1980)
- Roberto Vecchioni – Hollywood Hollywood (1982)
- Fabio Concato – Fabio Concato (1982)
- Stephen Schlaks – New Temptation (1982)
- Mina – 25 (1983)
- Guccini – Guccini (1983)
- Stephen Schlaks – Europe (1984)
- Mina – Catene (1984)
- Paolo Conte – Paolo Conte (1985)
- Mina – Finalmente Ho Conosciuto Il Conte Dracula (1985)
- Paolo Conte – Concerti (1985)
- Mina – Si, Buana (1986)
- Stephen Schlaks – Shining Star (1986)
- Francesco Guccini – Fra La Via Emilia E Il West (1987
- Mina – Rane Supreme (1987)
- Guccini – Signora Bovary (1987)
- Mina – Ridi Pagliaccio (1988)
- Mina – Uiallalla (1989)
- Pierangelo Bertoli – Sedia Elettrica (1989)
- Mina – Ti Conosco Mascherina (1990)
- Francesco Guccini – Quello Che Non... (1990)
- Mina – Caterpillar (1991)
- Fabrizio De André – Concerti (1991)
- Angelo Branduardi – Si Può Fare (1992)
- Mina – Sorelle Lumière (1992)
- Francesco Guccini – Parnassius Guccinii (1993)
- Angelo Branduardi – Domenica E Lunedì (1994)
- Angelo Branduardi – Camminando Camminando (1996)
- De André – In Concerto (1999)
- Paolo Conte – Reveries (2003)
- Francesco Guccini – Ritratti (2004)
- Fabrizio De André – Anime Salve 1996/2006 (2006)
- Edoardo Bennato – Salviamo Il Salvabile (2006)
- Francesco Guccini – Radici (2007)
- Fabrizio De André – 1991 - 2004 (2010)
- Francesco Guccini – L'ultima Thule (2012)
- Paolo Conte – Concerti (2014)
- Angelo Branduardi – Camminando Camminando In Tre (2015)
