= Viaggiatrice solitaria =

Viaggiatrice aolitaria

Greatest hits album by Alice
- Released: 1995
- Recorded: 1980–1992
- Genre: Pop, rock, alternative
- Length: 72:39
- Label: EMI
- Producer: Francesco Messina; Angelo Carrara

Alice chronology
Mezzogiorno sulle Alpi (1992)	Viaggiatrice aolitaria (1995)	Charade (1995)

Viaggiatrice solitaria – Il meglio di Alice is a compilation album of recordings by Italian singer-songwriter Alice, released by EMI Music in 1995.

Unlike EMI Italiana's 1994 best of package Il vento caldo dell'estate, which mainly included tracks from the artist's early career plus a disco remix of the 1982 duet "Chan-son Egocentrique" with Franco Battiato which surprisingly omitted all vocals by the composer himself, this compilation was produced with both the participation and approval of Alice. Viaggiatrice solitaria focuses on material from the albums Mezzogiorno sulle Alpi (1992), Il sole nella pioggia (1989) and Park Hotel (1986) – and it includes the original unremixed duet version of "Chan-son Egocentrique".

Viaggiatrice Solitaria (meaning "Solitary Traveller") became the final collaboration between the artist and the EMI Music label. Her first studio album for WEA/Warner Music, Charade, was released later that same year.

== Track listing ==
1. "In viaggio sul tuo viso" (Francesco Messina, Alice) – 4:06
  - Includes "Istenem, Istenem" (Traditional, arranged by Francesco Messina, Alice)
  - From 1992 album Mezzogiorno sulle Alpi
2. "Nomadi" (Juri Camisasca) – 4:29
  - From 1986 album Park Hotel
3. "I treni di Tozeur" (1987 solo version) (Franco Battiato, Saro Cosentino, Giusto Pio) – 4:23
  - From 1987 album Elisir. Original duet version with Franco Battiato released as non-album single in 1984.
4. "Cieli del nord" (Alice, Marco Liverani) – 4:51
  - From 1989 album Il sole nella pioggia
5. "Visioni" (Juri Camisasca) – 4:38
  - From 1989 album Il sole nella pioggia
6. "Viali di solitudine" (Francesco Messina, Marco Liverani) – 4:04
  - From 1986 album Park Hotel
7. "Il sole nella pioggia" (Juri Camisasca) – 5:08
  - From 1989 album Il sole nella pioggia
8. "Passano gli anni" (Francesco Messina, Mino Di Martino) – 3:50
  - From 1992 album Mezzogiorno sulle Alpi
9. "L'era del mito" (Juri Camisasca) – 4:33
  - From 1989 album Il sole nella pioggia
10. "Lungo ritorno a casa" (Francesco Messina, Alice, Rosario Cosentino) – 4:43
  - From 1992 album Mezzogiorno sulle Alpi
11. "Le ragazze di Osaka" (Francesco Messina, Eugenio Finardi, Luca Madonia) – 4:09
  - From 1989 album Il sole nella pioggia
12. "Prospettiva Nevski" (Franco Battiato) – 3:39
  - From 1985 album Gioielli rubati
13. "Chan-son Egocentrique" (duet with Franco Battiato) (Franco Battiato, Francesco Messina, Tommaso Tramonti) – 3:52
  - From 1982 album Azimut
14. "Per Elisa" (Franco Battiato, Giusto Pio, Alice) – 3:40
  - From 1981 album Alice a.k.a. Per Elisa
15. "Il vento caldo dell'estate (Franco Battiato, Giusto Pio, Francesco Messina, Alice) – 3:34
  - From 1980 album Capo Nord
16. "Volo di notte" (Francesco Messina, Alice) – 5:07
  - From 1986 album Park Hotel
17. "La recessione" (Pier Paolo Pasolini, Mino Di Martino) – 3:53
  - From 1992 album Mezzogiorno sulle Alpi

== Personnel ==
- Alice – vocals, percussion track 9, EMS synthesizer track 15, keyboards track 17
- Pino Pischetola – computer, drum programming track 1
- Marco Guarniero – computer, guitars & keyboards track 1, acoustic and electric guitars track 3, keyboards programming & guitars track 4, keyboards & computer programming track 5, computer programming track 7, additional keyboards track 8, keyboards track 9, classic & electric guitars track 10
- Francesco Messina – keyboards & bass track 1, keyboard programming track 3, keyboards track 5, keyboards & percussion programming track 7, keyboards track 8, keyboards & percussion track 9, keyboards tracks 10 & 17
- Gavin Harrison – drums tracks 1 & 8, percussion tracks 10 & 17
- Paolo Fresu – trumpet tracks 1, 4, 5 & 10
- Jerry Marotta – drums, LinnDrum programming tracks 2, 6 & 16
- Tony Levin – bass guitar, stick bass tracks 2, 6 & 16
- Phil Manzanera – guitars tracks 2, 6 & 16
- Michele Fedrigotti – keyboard instruments, MIDI piano tracks 2, 6 & 16, keyboards, Korg digital piano, synthesizer bass track 3, sampled strings track 10, keyboards 12
- Pietro Pellegrini – Fairlight programming tracks 2, 6 & 16
- Curt Cress – drums, percussion instruments track 3
- Filippo Destrieri – keyboards, computer and drum machine track 3, keyboard instruments, OBX, Fender, Roland, EMS track 14
- Marco Liverani – keyboards tracks 3, 5 & 9, keyboard instruments, Arp 2600 track 15
- Steve Jansen – drums track 4, 5, 7 & 11 keyboards track 7
- Richard Barbieri – keyboards & keyboard programming tracks track 4, 5, 7 & 11 "Prophet V Guitar" track 5, "Prophet V Guitar" solo track 9
- Jon Hassell – keyboard activated sound (sampled trumpet) track 5, trumpet track 7
- Dave Gregory – guitars tracks 5 & 7, electric guitars tracks 8, 12-string and E-Bow solo guitar track 9, acoustic guitar track 10, acoustic & electric guitars track 17
- Jan Maidman – bass guitar track 7 & 11
- Danny Thompson – double bass tracks 8 & 17
- Jakko Jakszyk – guitars track 8
- Bobo Romani – flutes track 8
- Pino Pischerola – EMU III programming track 9, computer, drum programming track 10
- Roberto Baldi – Prophet bass & keyboards track 9
- Nino Lali Piccoli – tablas solo track 9
- Orchestra della Scala di Milano (The La Scala Orchestra, Milan) – string instruments, woodwind instruments track 12
- Mauro Spina – drums track 15
- Stefano Cerri – bass guitar track 15
- Alberto Radius – guitars track 15
- Giusto Pio – violin track 15
- Mark Harris – piano track 15
- Lino "Capra" Vacina – timpani track 15

== Production ==
- Francesco Messina – record producer except tracks 12–15
- Angelo Carrara – producer tracks 12–15
