= Centro di gravità permanente =

Song by Franco Battiato

from the album La voce del padrone
- Released: 1981
- Label: EMI
- Songwriters: Franco Battiato; Giusto Pio

Music video
- "Centro di gravità permanente" on YouTube

"Centro di gravità permanente" (transl. "Permanent center of gravity") is a song by Italian singer-songwriter Franco Battiato. It was released as a track from his eleventh studio album La voce del padrone on 21 September 1981.

== Release ==
The song was written by Franco Battiato and Gusto Pio. It was produced by Franco Battiato and Angelo Carrara. The song was released as a single in Netherlands (Capitol), Argentina (EMI) Spain (EMI/Odeon) and France (EMI/Pathé). It was released as a 45 rpm vinyl single with the song "Summer on a Solitary Beach" as the B-side. A Spanish-language version translated by Carlos Toro and entitled "Centro de gravedad permanente", was released in Spain in 1986, and included in his album Ecos de Danzas Sufi.. In 2015, British singer-songwriter Mika released an English-language version of the song, titled "Center of Gravity" and featuring Battiato himself, that was included on the Italian edition of his fourth studio album, No Place in Heaven.

Battiato included the song on his live albums Giubbe Rose (1989), Last Summer Dance (2003), and Live in Roma (2016). Live in Roma was recorded with the singer Alice.

In a competition called "I Love My Radio", both Biagio Antonacci and Francesco Gabbani covered the song.

== Meaning ==
The song makes reference to the sense of loss felt by Battiato. Like the songs "Bandiera Bianca" and "Cuccurucucù", the song's lyrics make reference to random images. The "permanent centre of gravity" in the title is a quote from George Gurdjieff, and is intended as a place of intimacy where the singer hopes to find stability and be a simple observer.

== In other media ==
The song featured in season 4 of the Netflix television series Money Heist, performed by the cast. The song was also featured in the first story in Homo Argentum.

== Charts ==
Weekly chart performance for "Centro di gravità permanente"
Chart (2020)	Peak position
Italy (FIMI)	55

== Certifications ==
Certifications for "Centro di gravità permanente"
Region	Certification	Certified units/sales
Italy (FIMI)	2× Platinum	200,000^{‡}
^{‡} Sales+streaming figures based on certification alone.
