= Gioielli rubati =

1985 album by Alice

Gioielli rubati– Alice canta Battiato

Studio album by Alice
- Released: 1985
- Recorded: 1985
- Genre: Pop, rock
- Length: 31:34
- Label: EMI
- Producer: Angelo Carrara

Alice chronology
| Alice (1984) | Gioielli rubati– Alice canta Battiato (1985) | Alice (1986) |

Gioielli rubati– Alice canta Battiato is the seventh studio album by Italian singer-songwriter Alice, released in 1985 on EMI Music.

== History ==
The album, whose title translates as Stolen Jewels – Alice sings Battiato, followed the highly successful 1984 single and Eurovision Song Contest entry "I treni di Tozeur", a duet with the composer. Gioielli rubati includes songs from Battiato's pop albums L'era del cinghiale bianco (1979), Patriots (1980), La voce del padrone (1981), L'arca di Noè (1982) and Orizzonti perduti (1983). "Luna indiana" ("Indian Moon"), loosely based on Beethoven's "Moonlight Sonata" and originally largely instrumental had new lyrics penned by Francesco Messina, partly spoken and partly sung by Alice. Just like the preceding single "I treni di Tozeur", the album prominently features strings courtesy of the opera house La Scala, arranged and conducted by classical composer Roberto Cacciapaglia.

The opening track "Prospettiva Nevski", minutely detailing a cold winter's day at Saint Petersburg's Nevsky Prospekt in the early 20th century, became Alice's best-selling solo single in Continental Europe and Scandinavia since her breakthrough with Sanremo music festival winner "Per Elisa" in 1981, and despite the fact that it originally was recorded by Battiato, it today counts as one of her signature tunes in Italy. Further single releases from the Gioielli rubati album include "Summer on A Solitary Beach", "Luna Indiana" and "Il Re del Mondo". Franco Battiato himself released the album Mondi lontanissimi the same year, which also included a new version of "Il Re del Mondo" as well as solo interpretations of "I treni di Tozeur" and "Chan-son Egocentrique", both previously recorded as duets with Alice.

A re-recorded version of "Prospettiva Nevski" with the London Session Orchestra was included in the 2000 career retrospective Personal Jukebox (along with three other Alice/Battiato remakes not originating from Gioielli rubati).

All tracks from the Gioielli rubati album were included on the EMI budget compilation Alice canta Battiato in 1997, in addition to the seven other Battiato penned tracks released by Alice on her albums thus far. On her later albums, Alice has recorded half a dozen further Battiato songs.

In 2022, Alice released Eri con me (Sedici canzoni di Franco Battiato) with I Solisti Filarmonici Italiani, an album of 16 Battiato songs, 11 of which were entirely new in the Alice discography.

== Track listing ==
Side A

1. "Prospettiva Nevski" (Franco Battiato) – 3:39
2. "Il Re del Mondo" (Franco Battiato) – 2:57
3. "Mal d'Africa" (Franco Battiato) – 2:56
4. Segnali di vita" (Franco Battiato) – 3:35
5. "Le aquile" (Fleur Jaeggy, Franco Battiato) – 2:55

Side B

1. "Summer on a Solitary Beach" (Franco Battiato) – 4:32
2. "Gli uccelli" (Franco Battiato) – 4:07
3. "Un'altra vita" (Franco Battiato) – 3:31
4. "Luna indiana" (Francesco Messina, Franco Battiato) – 3:22

== Personnel ==
- Alice – lead vocals
- Aldo Banfi – computers, keyboards, drum machines
- Michele Fedrigotti – keyboards
- Orchestra della Scala di Milano (The La Scala Orchestra, Milan) – string instruments, woodwind instruments

== Production ==
- Angelo Carrara – record producer
- Roberto Cacciapaglia – musical arranger, sound engineer
- Recorded at Studio Sette, Milan (February 1985)
- Franco Zorzi – sound engineer
- Mixed at The Power Station Studios, New York (March 1985)
- Jeff Friedriekson – sound engineer
- Francesco Messina – art direction
- Gik Piccardi – photography

== Charts ==
| Chart (1985) | Peak massima |
|---|---|
| Austria | 12 |
| Germany | 42 |
| Sweden | 15 |
| Switzerland | 13 |
