= Alice (1986 album) =

Greatest hits album by Alice
- Released: 1986
- Recorded: 1980–1983
- Genre: Pop, rock
- Length: 57:55
- Label: EMI
- Producer: Angelo Carrara

Alice chronology
Gioielli rubati (1985)	Alice (1986)	Park Hotel (1986)

Alice is a compilation album of recordings by Italian singer-songwriter Alice, released by EMI Music in 1986.

The Alice compilation was released in Continental Europe and Scandinavia in early 1986 after the commercial success of the 1984 Eurovision Song Contest entry "I treni di Tozeur", a duet with singer and composer Franco Battiato, and the following tribute album Gioielli rubati - Alice canta Battiato in 1985, including hit single "Prospettiva Nevski"; the cover picture is in fact from the same photo sessions as for the Gioielli Rubati album. The collection, which was the first career retrospective and also compact disc release with Alice, comprises material from her first four studio albums for the EMI label, Capo Nord (1980), Alice (also known as Per Elisa, 1981), Azimut (1982) and Falsi allarmi (1983), including hit singles "Il vento caldo dell'estate", "Per Elisa", "Una notte speciale", "Messaggio" and "Notte a Roma" and the set opens with her first duet with Franco Battiato, 1982's "Chan-son Egocentrique".

The Alice compilation is not to be confused with a similar eponymously titled compilation, first released by CGD/Warner Music in 1984.

== Track listing ==
1. "Chan-son Egocentrique" (duet with Franco Battiato) (Franco Battiato, Francesco Messina, Tommaso Tramonti) – 3:52
  - From 1982 album Azimut
2. "Azimut" (Alice) – 3:44
  - From 1982 album Azimut
3. "La mano" (Alice) – 5:35
  - From 1982 album Azimut
4. "A cosa pensano" (Francesco Messina, Alice) – 3:42
  - From 1982 album Azimut
5. "Messaggio" (Alice, Albert Kui (pseudonym for Franco Battiato), Giusto Pio) – 3:46
  - From 1982 album Azimut
6. "Principessa" (Alice) – 4:28
  - From 1982 album Azimut
7. "Il vento caldo dell'estate" (Franco Battiato, Giusto Pio, Francesco Messina, Alice) – 3:34
  - From 1980 album Capo Nord
8. "Una sera di Novembre" (Alice) – 3:03
  - From 1980 album Capo Nord
9. "Solo un'idea" (Alice, Matteo Fasolino, Alice) – 4:16
  - From 1983 album Falsi allarmi
10. "Il profumo del silenzio" (Alice, Matteo Fasolino, Alice) – 4:32
  - From 1983 album Falsi allarmi
11. "Notte a Roma" (Alice) – 4:22
  - From 1983 album Falsi allarmi
12. "La canzone più bella" (Alice, Matteo Fasolino, Alice) – 5:07
  - From 1983 album Falsi allarmi
13. "Per Elisa" (Franco Battiato, Giusto Pio, Alice) – 3:40
  - From 1981 album Alice
14. "Una notte speciale" (Alice, Franco Battiato, Giusto Pio) – 4:14
  - From 1981 album Alice

== Sources and external links ==
- Rateyourmusic.com entry
- Alicewebsite.it discography entry
