= Alice (1984 album) =

Compilation album by Alice
- Released: 1984
- Recorded: 1975, 1977
- Genre: Pop, rock
- Length: 57:55
- Label: CGD/Warner

Alice chronology
Falsi allarmi (1983)	Alice (1984)	Gioielli rubati (1985)

Alice is a compilation album of recordings by Italian singer-songwriter Alice, released by CGD in 1984.

The Alice compilation was released by Warner Music's Italian sublabel CGD after Alice had signed with EMI and had had her commercial breakthrough after winning the Sanremo Music Festival with the song "Per Elisa" in 1981. The twelve track set comprises material recorded for the CBS Records label for the albums La mia poca grande età and Cosa resta... Un fiore under her then stage name Alice Visconti, originally issued in 1975 and 1977 respectively. Alice was first released on vinyl in 1984, re-released on CD in 1988 and remains in print.

The Alice compilation is not to be confused with a similar eponymously titled compilation released by EMI in 1986.

== Track listing ==
Side A

1. "Io voglio vivere" (Stefano D'Orazio, Renato Brioschi, Cristiano Minellono) – 5:22
  - From 1975 album La mia poca grande età and 1977 album Cosa resta... Un fiore
2. "Diciott'anni" (Stefano D'Orazio, Massimo Guantini) – 3:45
  - From 1975 album La mia poca grande età
3. "Sempre tu, sempre di più" (Stefano D'Orazio, Massimo Guantini) – 3:59
  - From 1975 album La mia poca grande età
4. "Domani vado via" (Stefano D'Orazio, Salvatore Fabrizio) – 5:03
  - From 1975 album La Mia Poca Grande Età
5. "Senza l'amore" (Luigi Lopez, Carla Vistarini) – 4:26
  - From 1977 album Cosa resta... Un fiore
6. "...E respiro" (Riccardo Fogli, Danilo Vaona) – 4:21
  - From 1977 album Cosa resta... Un fiore

Side B

1. "Senza l'amore" (Luigi Lopez, Carla Vistarini) – 4:26
  - From 1977 album Cosa resta... Un fiore
2. "Una mia semplice storia" (Stefano D'Orazio, Renato Brioschi) – 3:37
  - From 1977 album Cosa resta... Un fiore
3. "Mondo a matita" (Luigi Lopez, Carla Vistarini) – 5:45
  - From 1977 album Cosa resta... Un fiore
4. "Un fiore" (Luigi Lopez, Carla Vistarini) – 4:29
  - From 1977 album Cosa resta... Un fiore
5. "Alberi" (Luigi Lopez) – 4:01
  - From 1977 album Cosa resta... Un fiore
6. "Un'isola" (Luigi Lopez, Carla Vistarini) – 4:41
  - From 1977 album Cosa resta... Un fiore

== Sources and external links ==
- Rateyourmusic.com entry
- Alicewebsite.it discography entry
