= God Is My DJ =

Studio album by Alice
- Released: 1999
- Recorded: 1999
- Genre: Vocal; Instrumental; Folk; Classical
- Length: 43:04
- Label: WEA/Warner Music
- Producer: Francesco Messina

Alice chronology
Exit (1998)	God Is My DJ (1999)	Personal Jukebox (2000)

Alternative cover

God Is My DJ is the fifteenth studio album by Italian singer-songwriter Alice, released in 1999 on WEA/Warner Music.

After the release of two pop albums, Charade in 1996 and Exit in 1998, Alice again changed musical direction and set out on a low-key tour with a six-piece acoustic band performing in smaller venues and churches in the North of Italy, interpreting sacral – but not exclusively religious – music. As the singer writes in the liner notes: "This is not an exploration of spiritual music as such but rather a search for the spirit in music." The partly instrumental concert God Is My DJ, which later was recorded in studio and released on Warner Music, comprises works by composers as diverse as Arvo Pärt, David Crosby, Popol Vuh, Gavin Bryars, Franco Battiato and Jane Siberry, French, Hungarian and Livonian traditionals as well as eleventh and fourteenth century hymns sung in Ancient Greek and Latin.

Gabriel Fauré's "Pie Jesu" was first recorded on the 1988 classical album Mélodie passagère, the French folk song "Orléans" on the pop album Il sole nella pioggia in 1989 and the Hungarian "Istenem Istenem" (as part of "In viaggio sul tuo viso") and "Madre notte" ("Mother Night") both on 1992's Mezzogiorno Sulle Alpi. Franco Battiato's original version of "L'oceano di silenzio" ("The Ocean of Silence") was included on his 1988 album Fisiognomica, which also featured his version of Alice's "Nomadi", and "L'ombra della luce" on 1991's Come un camello in una grondaia and later also on the EMI Classical volume Shadow, Light. Eleni Karaindrou's "Refugee's Theme" is originally from the soundtrack to Theo Angelopoulos' film The Unsuspended Step of the Stork.

Among the songs originally performed as part of the God Is My DJ concert but not included on the studio album were Peter Gabriel's 1989 instrumental "With This Love" from the album Passion: Music for The Last Temptation of Christ, the hymns "Planctus Mariae Et Aliorum in Die Parasceven" and "Crucifixio Iesu Christi Domini nostri Mysterium Crucis", "Il cielo sopra il cielo" from Alice's preceding album Exit, the title track from 1989's Il sole nella pioggia, "Dammi la mano amore" from 1995's Charade and "Nomadi" from 1986's Park Hotel.

== Track listing ==
1. "Jesus Blood Never Failed Me Yet (Gavin Bryars – 1974) – 1:20
2. "Calling All Angels" (Jane Siberry – 1991) – 4:56
3. "Madre notte (Alice, Francesco Messina, Paolo Fresu – 1992) – 1:32
4. "Kyrie" (Florian Fricke/Popol Vuh – 1972) – 5:26
5. "L'ombra della luce" (Franco Battiato – 1992) – 3:55
6. "Victimae Paschali Laudes" (Unknown – eleventh century) – 1:53
7. "Where Will I Be?" (David Crosby – 1972) – 3:26
8. "L'oceano di silenzio" (Franco Battiato, Fleur Jaeggy – 1988) – 4:15
9. "Unerhiireke" (Livonian heritage, Veljo Tormis – 1970) – 2:51
10. "Für Alina" (instrumental) (Arvo Pärt – 1976) – 1:45
11. "Istenem Istenem" (Hungarian traditional) – 1:42
12. "Orléans" (French traditional, arranged by David Crosby) – 1:05
13. "Ághios O Theós" (Unknown – fourteenth century) – 1:40
14. "Refugee's Theme" (instrumental) (Eleni Karaindrou – 1991) – 2:18
15. "Pie Jesu" (Mass from Requiem, op.48, Gabriel Fauré – 1888) – 5:00

== Personnel ==
- Alice – lead vocals, keyboards, backing vocals
- Marco Guarnerio – electric & acoustic guitars tracks 1, 2, 4, 7 & 11, vocals track 2, keyboards track 6
- Simone D'Eusanio – electric violin tracks 1, 2, 4, 5, 8 & 11
- Ines Hrelia – violoncello tracks 1, 2, 4, 5, 8 & 14
- Michele Fedrigotti – keyboards tracks 1, 4, 5, 8, 11, 13–15, backing vocals 13
- Alberto Tafuri – electric piano & sound programming tracks 2 & 11
- Francesco Messina – additional keyboards & loops tracks 1–3, 7, 11–14

== Production ==
- Francesco Messina – record producer
- Recorded and mixed by Pino Pinaxa Pischetola at Stonehenge Studio, Milan July – October 1999
- Preproduction at Didde Studio, November 1998
- Computer programming & processing – Pino Pinaxa Pischetola & Marco Guarnerio
- Sounds programming – Francesco Messina
- Transcriptions courtesy of Michele Fedrigotti, Marco Guarnerio & Alberto Tufuri
- Polystudio – cover design
- Polystudio archives – images
- Sheila Rock – photography, portrait

== Notes ==
- Liner notes: Alice – God Is My DJ Warner Fonit 857381021 2, 1999
