= Exit (Alice album) =

Studio album by Alice
- Released: 1998
- Recorded: 1998
- Genre: Alternative; Electronica; R&B; Ambient
- Length: 46:01
- Label: WEA/Warner Music
- Producer: Francesco Messina

Alice chronology
Charade (1995)	Exit (1998)	God Is My DJ (1999)

Professional ratings
Review scores
Source	Rating
Allmusic	3/5 stars

Exit is the fourteenth studio album by Italian singer-songwriter Alice, released in 1998 on WEA/Warner Music.

After the musically experimental and lyrically introspective albums Mezzogiorno sulle Alpi (1992) and Charade (1995) Alice released Exit in 1998, her most pop-oriented and melodic studio album since the late 1980s. As Allmusic wrote in their review: "the album often suggests Sarah McLachlan in a duet with Enigma".

The lead single "I Am a Taxi" was a lyrically minimalistic up-tempo dance groove with influences from contemporary R&B and electronica, and the single included further dancefloor friendly remixes. The second single release, "Open Your Eyes", was an English/Italian language duet with Skye Edwards, lead singer of British electronica and trip hop band Morcheeba, recorded shortly after the release of their 1998 album Big Calm (#18 UK). "Open Your Eyes" was co-written by Alice, producer Francesco Messina, singer-songwriter Juri Camisasca and Peter Hammill of Van der Graaf Generator and was again one of the most accessible and chart-oriented tracks the singer had recorded since Il Sole Nella Pioggia. The promo video showed the two singers performing the song sitting in a rowing boat on a sunny summer's day in London's Hyde Park. Third single "Dimmi Di Sì" ("Tell Me Yes") was a midtempo ballad which juxtaposed subtle club beats and ambient keyboard effects against acoustic guitars. Exit also included a second duet between Alice and Italian alternative rock band Bluvertigo's Morgan, "L'immagine" ("The Images"), and the two were to duet again on both Personal Jukebox in 2000 and Viaggio in Italia in 2003. The one-minute-eighteen-second "Il cielo sopra il cielo" was an excerpt from the ambient/crossover group project Devogue's eponymous 1997 debut album, a forty-five-minute sound collage which had featured vocals by Alice on five of the thirteen titles.

The acoustic track "1943", written by Alice's longtime collaborator Mino di Martino, and lyrically influenced by the works of German poet and playwright Else Lasker-Schüler, draws parallels between the horrors of the Holocaust and the at the time on-going war in The Balkans, and its so called ethnic cleansing. When playing the song live on the following Exit tour Alice specifically urged her audiences to donate money to organisations helping refugees from the former Yugoslavia coming to Italy. She later also performed the song in Italian manifestations against the Iraq War.

Exit closes with a cover version of French poet, composer, singer and musician Léo Ferré's "L'Étranger" ("The Stranger"), a poem by Charles Baudelaire set to music by Ferré and first released on his 1967 double album Léo Ferré chante Baudelaire.

Both the "I Am A Taxi" and "Open Your Eyes" singles included the non-album track "Da Lontano".

Both "Open Your Eyes" and "Dimmi Di Sì" were later included in the 2000 career retrospective Personal Jukebox.

== Track listing ==
1. "Dimmi di sì" (Alice) – 4:13
2. "Open Your Eyes" (duet with Skye of Morcheeba) (Juri Camisasca, Peter Hammill, Alice, Francesco Messina) – 4:08
3. "Il vento soltanto" (Alice, Osvaldo Coluccino) – 3:25
4. "L'immagine" (duet with Morgan) (Luca Urbani, Marco "Morgan" Castoldi, Francesco Messina) – 3:43
5. "Exit" (Alice, Osvaldo Coluccino) – 4:26
6. "Isole" (Lorenzo Amato, Vincenzo Zitello) – 3:45
7. "Il contatto" (Alice) – 3:45
8. "Il cielo sopra il cielo" (Francesco Messina, Mino Di Martino) – 1:18
9. "I Am a Taxi" (Francesco Messina, Alice) – 4:29
10. "1943" (Mino Di Martino) – 3:33
11. "Transito" (Mino Di Martino, Francesco Messina) – 4:21
12. "Lo specchio" (Francesco Messina, Alice) – 1:58
13. "L'Étranger" (Charles Baudelaire, Léo Ferré) – 3:07

== Personnel ==
- Alice – lead vocals, keyboards tracks 2, 3, 5, 7 & 12
- Marco "Morgan" Castoldi – vocals & electric bass track 4
- Andrea Cernecca – cello track 13
- Osvaldo Coluccino – vocals track 5
- Simone D'Eusanio – electric violin track 6, 7 & 11
- Skye Edwards – vocals track 2
- Michele Fedrigotti – string arrangements track 6
- Marco Guarnerio – acoustic guitar tracks 3–5, electric guitar tracks 9 & 11, additional keyboards tracks 1, 3, 5, 6 & 11, Hammond organ track 11, synth bass tracks 1, 3, 5 & 9
- Francesco Messina – synthesizers, samplers tracks 1, 3, 4, 7, 9, 11 & 13, synth "guitar" tracks 1 & 3, beats tracks 11 & 12
- Pino Pinaxa Pischetola – rhythm constructions tracks 1–5, 7, 9 & 13
- Bruno Romani – flute track 13, saxophone track 6
- Mauro Spina – synth bass track 2, wave drum tracks 7 & 13
- Luca Urbani – vocals track 4
- Vincenzo Zitello – celtic harp track 6

== Production ==
- Francesco Messina – record producer, sounds programming
- Pino Pinaxa Pischetola – computer programming + processing, sound engineer, Stonehenge Studio
- Marco Guarnerio – computer programming + processing, sound engineer, Didde Studio
- Mixed by Pino Pinaxa Pischetola, Stonehenge Studio, Milan
- Antonio Baglio – Mastering at Nautilus
- Polystudio – cover design
- Gianfranco Casula – Mac artwork
- Sheila Rock – photography (Alice, London)
- Alessandro Paderni – photography, (other photos, Milan) Altre foto: Milano
- Una Sas, Bologna – executive producers
- Paolo Santoli, Musica Srl, Bologna – management
