= Bandiera bianca =

Single by Franco Battiato

from the album La voce del padrone
- B-side: "Summer on a Solitary Beach"
- Released: 1981
- Genre: Pop rock; new wave; synth pop
- Length: 5:19
- Label: EMI Italiana
- Songwriters: Franco Battiato, Giusto Pio

Franco Battiato singles chronology
| "L'era del cinghiale bianco" (1979) | "Bandiera bianca" (1981) | "I treni di Tozeur" (1984) |

Music video
- "Bandiera bianca" on YouTube

"Bandiera bianca" (lit. 'White flag') is a 1981 song by Italian singer-songwriter Franco Battiato. It is the only single from his best-selling album La voce del padrone.

== Background ==
The song is considered a follow-up of Battiato's 1980 song "Up Patriots to Arms": while in the former he asked the public to mobilize against stupidity, here he polemically and pessimistically surrenders to it. It was first presented live, during the last dates of the "Patriots" summer tour, and officially premiered at the Mostra internazionale di musica leggera in Venice in September 1981.

== Lyrics ==
The song opens with citations of Bob Dylan's "Mr. Tambourine Man" and "The Times They Are a-Changin'", and includes references to Alan Sorrenti's "Figli delle stelle", Gino Latilla's "Tutte le mamme" and The Doors' "The End". The refrain is a citation of Arnaldo Fusinato's 1849 poem L'ultima ora di Venezia, while the closure cites Theodor W. Adorno's book title Minima Moralia, which gets twisted into "Minima Immoralia".

== Track listing ==
Lyrics by Franco Battiato; Music by Franco Battiato and Giusto Pio

- 7" single

| No. | Title | Length |
|---|---|---|
| 1. | "Bandiera bianca" | 5:19 |
| 2. | "Summer on a Solitary Beach" | 4:53 |

== Charts ==
| Chart (1981) | Peak position |
|---|---|
| Italy (Musica e dischi) | 24 |

== Certifications ==
| Region | Certification | Certified units/sales |
|---|---|---|
| Italy (FIMI) sales from 2009 | Gold | 50,000^{‡} |
^{‡} Sales+streaming figures based on certification alone.
