= Charade =

Charade or charades may refer to:

== Games ==
- Charades, originally "acting charades", a parlor game

== Films/TV ==
- Charade (1953 film), an American film featuring James Mason
- Charade (1963 film), an American film starring Cary Grant and Audrey Hepburn
- Charade (1984 film), a Canadian animated short film by John Minnis
- Charades (film), 1998, starring Erika Eleniak
- "Charade" (Revenge), a television episode
- "The Charade" 2010 TV episode of Romantically Challenged
- "Charades" (Scorpion), a 2014 episode of the action drama series Scorpion
- "Charades" (Star Trek: Strange New Worlds), an episode of the second season of Star Trek: Strange New Worlds

== Music ==
=== Groups ===
- Charade, a band renamed from Bonfire
- The Charade, band who covered Carpet Man
- The Charades, a doo-wop group

=== Albums ===
- Charade (Charade album)
- Charade (Alice album)

=== Songs ===
- "Charade" (1963 song), the theme song composed by Henry Mancini for the 1963 film
- "Charade" (Bee Gees song), a 1974 Bee Gees song
- "The Charade" (Serj Tankian song), a 2010 Serj Tankian song
- "Charades" (song), a 2014 Jennifer Lopez song
- "The Charade" (D'Angelo song), a 2015 D'Angelo song

== Other uses ==
- Charade (Soulcalibur), a character from the Soul series of fighting games
- Charade Circuit, a French auto-racing track
- Daihatsu Charade, an automobile
