= Voglio vederti danzare =

Franco Battiato song

- Screenshot from the music video

Song by Franco Battiato

from the album L'arca di Noè
- Released: 1982
- Genre: Pop, New wave
- Length: 3:39
- Label: EMI Italiana
- Songwriters: Franco Battiato, Giusto Pio

Music video
- "Voglio vederti danzare" on YouTube

"Voglio vederti danzare" (lit. 'I want to see you dance') is a 1982 song by Italian singer-songwriter Franco Battiato.

== Background ==
While no singles were officially released from the album L'arca di Noè, "Voglio vederti danzare" served as its leading song, with Battiato promoting it in his television appearances and shooting a music video of it.

The song's lyrics consists of a roundup of different dance forms of in various places and epochs, while the music is based on the combination of synthesisers and violins. Battiato's celebration of dance is meant in a spiritual sense, as a way to elevate oneself by connecting mind and body. The song has been described as a song whose sounds float between the East and the West and 'an apology of dance in an ethnic key'. While most of the song is in the meter 4/4, the first bar of each chorus is in 5/4, and the coda (after the lyrics mention valzer viennesi) is in 3/4. Because of the tonality rising after each refrain, Battiato's voice reaches an unusual very high range in this song.

=== Charts ===
Chart (2021)	Peak position
Italy (FIMI)	57

=== Certifications ===
Region	Certification	Certified units/sales
Italy (FIMI) sales from 2009	Platinum	70,000^{‡}
^{‡} Sales+streaming figures based on certification alone.

== Prezioso feat. Marvin version ==
"Voglio vederti danzare"

Song by Prezioso & Marvin
- Released: 2003
- Genre: Italo dance
- Length: 3:44
- Label: Belriver
- Songwriters: Franco Battiato, Giusto Pio

Prezioso & Marvin singles chronology
"In My Mind" (2003)	"Voglio vederti danzare" (2003)	"Le Louvre" (2004)

Music video
- "Voglio vederti danzare" on YouTube

In 2003, Prezioso & Marvin produced a dance version of the song, with which they took part in Festivalbar.

=== Charts ===
Chart (2003)	Peak position
Austria (Ö3 Austria Top 40)	32
Germany (GfK)	94
Italy (FIMI)	6

=== Certifications ===
Region	Certification	Certified units/sales
Italy (FIMI) sales from 2009	Gold	35,000^{‡}
^{‡} Sales+streaming figures based on certification alone.
