= La voce del padrone (album) =

Studio album by Franco Battiato
- Released: 21 September 1981
- Recorded: 1981
- Genre: Synthpop; pop rock; progressive rock
- Length: 31:24
- Label: EMI
- Producer: Angelo Carrara

Franco Battiato chronology
Patriots (1980)	La voce del padrone (1981)	L'arca di Noè (1982)

Singles from La voce del padrone
- 1. "Bandiera bianca" Released: 1981; 2. "Summer on a Solitary Beach" Released: 1981

La voce del padrone ("His Master's Voice") is an album by Italian singer-songwriter Franco Battiato, released by EMI Italiana in 1981. The album followed L'era del cinghiale bianco (1979) and Patriots (1980), which signaled a return by Battiato to a more pop-oriented style.

Besides being Battiato's first pop success, it was also the first Italian LP to sell more than one million copies.

== Overview ==
Before L'era del cinghiale bianco Battiato had begun to collaborate with violinist and composer Giusto Pio. In La voce del padrone Battiato could rely on Pio's collaboration too, even if violin was never used in the scores.

== Album ==
The album is a mixture of synthpop, dance and progressive. "Bandiera Bianca" quotes "Mr. Tambourine Man" by Bob Dylan, while "Cuccurucucù" borrows the refrain from the Tomás Méndez song "Cucurrucucú paloma". The better known songs of this album are "Summer on a Solitary Beach", "Bandiera bianca" and "Centro di gravità permanente".

== Track listing ==
1. "Summer on a Solitary Beach" - 4:34
2. "Bandiera bianca" - 5:19
3. "Gli uccelli" - 4:43
4. "Cuccurucucù" - 4:09
5. "Segnali di vita" - 3:37
6. "Centro di gravità permanente" - 3:55
7. "Sentimiento nuevo" - 4:18

== Personnel ==
- Alfredo Golino - Drums
- Paolo Donnarumma - Bass guitar
- Filippo Destrieri - Keyboards
- Alberto Radius - Guitar
- Claudio Pascoli - Saxophone
- Donato Scolese - Vibraphone
- Madrigalisti di Milano - Choir

== Charts ==
=== Weekly charts ===
1982 weekly chart performance for La voce del padrone
Chart	Peak position
Italian Albums (Hit Parade)	1

2021 weekly chart performance for La voce del padrone
Chart	Peak position
Italian Albums (FIMI)	12

=== Year-end charts ===
1982 year-end chart performance for La voce del padrone
Chart	Position
Italian Albums (Hit Parade)	1

2021 year-end chart performance for La voce del padrone
Chart	Position
Italian Albums (FIMI)	79

== Certifications ==
Certifications for La voce del padrone
Region	Certification	Certified units/sales
Italy (FIMI)	Platinum	50,000^{‡}
^{‡} Sales+streaming figures based on certification alone.
