= Viaggio in Italia (album) =

Studio album by Alice
- Released: 7 October 2003
- Recorded: 2001–2003
- Genre: Pop, rock, alternative
- Length: 55:05
- Label: NuN Entertainment
- Producer: Francesco Messina, Marco Guarnerio

Alice chronology
Personal Jukebox (2000)	Viaggio in Italia (2003)

Viaggio in Italia is the sixteenth studio album by the Italian singer-songwriter Alice, released in 2003 by NUN Entertainment.

Viaggio in Italia started as a tour project in 2001 called Le parole del giorno prima ("The Words of The Day Before"), an hommage to some of Italy's foremost cantautori, singer-songwriters and lyricists, among them Ivano Fossati, Fabrizio De André, Francesco De Gregori, Pier Paolo Pasolini, Lucio Battisti, Franco Battiato, Manlio Sgalambro and Giorgio Gaber, mainly covering material from the 1970s and the early 1980s but interpreted with contemporary musical arrangements and an emphasis on the lyrical values of the songs. The theme was poetry in popular music and it later developed to include two English language titles, on Viaggio in Italia both sung as duets with singer-songwriter Tim Bowness of the British progressive rock band No-Man; Peter Sinfield and Robert Fripp's "Islands" from King Crimson's album Islands and James Joyce's poem "Golden Hair", as set to music by the Pink Floyd member Syd Barrett and first recorded on his 1970 first solo album The Madcap Laughs.

Viaggio in Italia was released in 2003 on the independent label NuN and opens with a solo interpretation of the new composition "Come un sigillo" by Battiato and philosopher Manlio Sgalambro, originally recorded as a duet with the composer on his 2002 album Fleurs 3. The late Lucio Battisti's "Ecco i negozi" is a duet with the Italian alternative rock band Bluvertigo's lead singer Morgan with whom Alice had previously collaborated on the albums Exit in 1998 and Personal Jukebox in 2000. In 2004, the two among other noted Italian artists also appeared on the collaborative album project Zerouno, with Alice singing lead vocals on the track "Sospesa" ("Suspended").

The "Come un sigillo" single included two non-album tracks, "Rose e limoni" with lyrics by Pier Paolo Pasolini and music by Mino Di Martino and Léo Ferré's "Col tempo sai", both recorded live.

The Viaggio in Italia album brought Alice back to the Top 20 in Italy, peaking at No. 16 in September 2003.

Viaggio in Italia remains Alice's last full-length studio album to date. Since 2006 she has toured Italy with a concert programme called Lungo la Strada (Along the Road) incorporating material from the Viaggio in Italia album with songs from her early repertoire as well as new compositions, yet to be commercially released.

== Track listing ==
1. "Come un sigillo" (Franco Battiato, Manlio Sgalambro) – 3:37
2. "Al principe" (Pier Paolo Pasolini, Mino Di Martino) – 3:18
3. "Un blasfemo" (Fabrizio De André, Giuseppe Bentivoglio, Nicola Piovani) – 2:59
4. "La bellezza stravagante" (Ivano Fossati) – 3:56
5. "Atlantide" (Francesco De Gregori) – 4:28
6. "Cosa succederà alla ragazza" (Pasquale Panella, Lucio Battisti) – 4:58
7. "Islands" (duet with Tim Bowness; by Peter Sinfield, Robert Fripp) – 5:42
8. "Febbraio" (Pier Paolo Pasolini, Mino Di Martino) – 3:13
9. "Lindbergh" (Ivano Fossati) – 3:00
10. "Ecco i negozi" (duet with Morgan of Bluvertigo) (Pasquale Panella, Lucio Battisti) – 4:45
11. "Auschwitz" (Francesco Guccini) – 3:53
12. "È stato molto bello" (Franco Battiato, Manlio Sgalambro) – 3:27
13. "Non insegnate ai bambini" (Giorgio Gaber, Sando Luporini) – 4:41
14. "Golden Hair" (duet with Tim Bowness; by James Joyce, Syd Barrett) – 3:08

== Personnel ==
- Alice – lead vocals
- Pino Pinaxa Pischetola – rhythm constructions tracks 1, 2, 4–6, 9–11
- Marco Guarnerio – computer programming tracks 1–3, 6, 7, 10 & 11, guitars tracks 1, 4–6, 9, 11–14, keyboards tracks 1, 2, 4–13, zither track 12, piano track 7
- Francesco Messina – synthesizers, keyboards, beats & sounds
- Alberto Tufuri – piano track 12, keyboards track 4, string arrangements track 4, 12 & 13
- Paolo Fresu – trombone & flügelhorn tracks 1, 7 & 8
- Jakko Jakszyk – guitars tracks 2 & 5
- Michele Fedrigotti – keyboards tracks 8
- Tim Bowness (No-Man) – vocals tracks 7 & 14
- Morgan (Bluvertigo) – vocals & rhythm guitar track 10

== Production ==
- Francesco Messina – producer, musical arranger
- Marco Guarnerio – producer
- Alberto Tafuri – arranger track 12
- Recorded by Marco Guarnerio (Arecibo, Fonoprint & Didde Studios, assistant Andrea Debernardi) and by Pino Pinaxa Pischetola (Industria Musica, assistant Raffaele Stefani)
- Mixed by Pino Pinaxa Pischetola (Industria Musica)
- Sheila Rock – cover photography
- Polystudio, Francesca Zucchi & Max Piccardi – design & illustrations
- Mariella Reitano – coordinator, editorial assistant to Alice
- Arecibo Srl Edizioni Musicali – publishing management, Milan
