= Orizzonti perduti =

Studio album by Franco Battiato
- Released: 15 December 1983
- Recorded: 1983
- Genre: Italian singer-songwriters
- Length: 28:33
- Label: EMI Italiana
- Producer: Angelo Carrara

Franco Battiato chronology
L'arca di Noè (1982)	Orizzonti perduti (1983)	Mondi lontanissimi (1985)

Orizzonti perduti is an album by Italian singer-songwriter Franco Battiato, released by EMI Italiana on 15 December 1983.

== Track listing ==
1. "La stagione dell'amore"
2. "Tramonto occidentale"
3. "Zone depresse"
4. "Un'altra vita"
5. "Mal d'Africa"
6. "La musica è stanca" (lyrics: Franco Battiato, Tommaso Tramonti)
7. "Gente in progresso"
8. "Campane tibetane"

== Personnel ==
- Filippo Destrieri - keyboards
- Luigi Tonet - Micro Composer
- Simone Majocchi - PPG Wave programming
- Gianfranco D'Adda - drums
- Giusto Pio - violin

== Charts ==
=== Weekly charts ===
Weekly chart performance for Orizzonti perduti
Chart (1984)	Peak position
Italian Albums (Hit Parade)	7

=== Year-end charts ===
Year-end chart performance for Orizzonti perduti
Chart (1984)	Position
Italian Albums (Hit Parade)	32
