= Alice (Italian singer) =

Italian singer (born 1954)

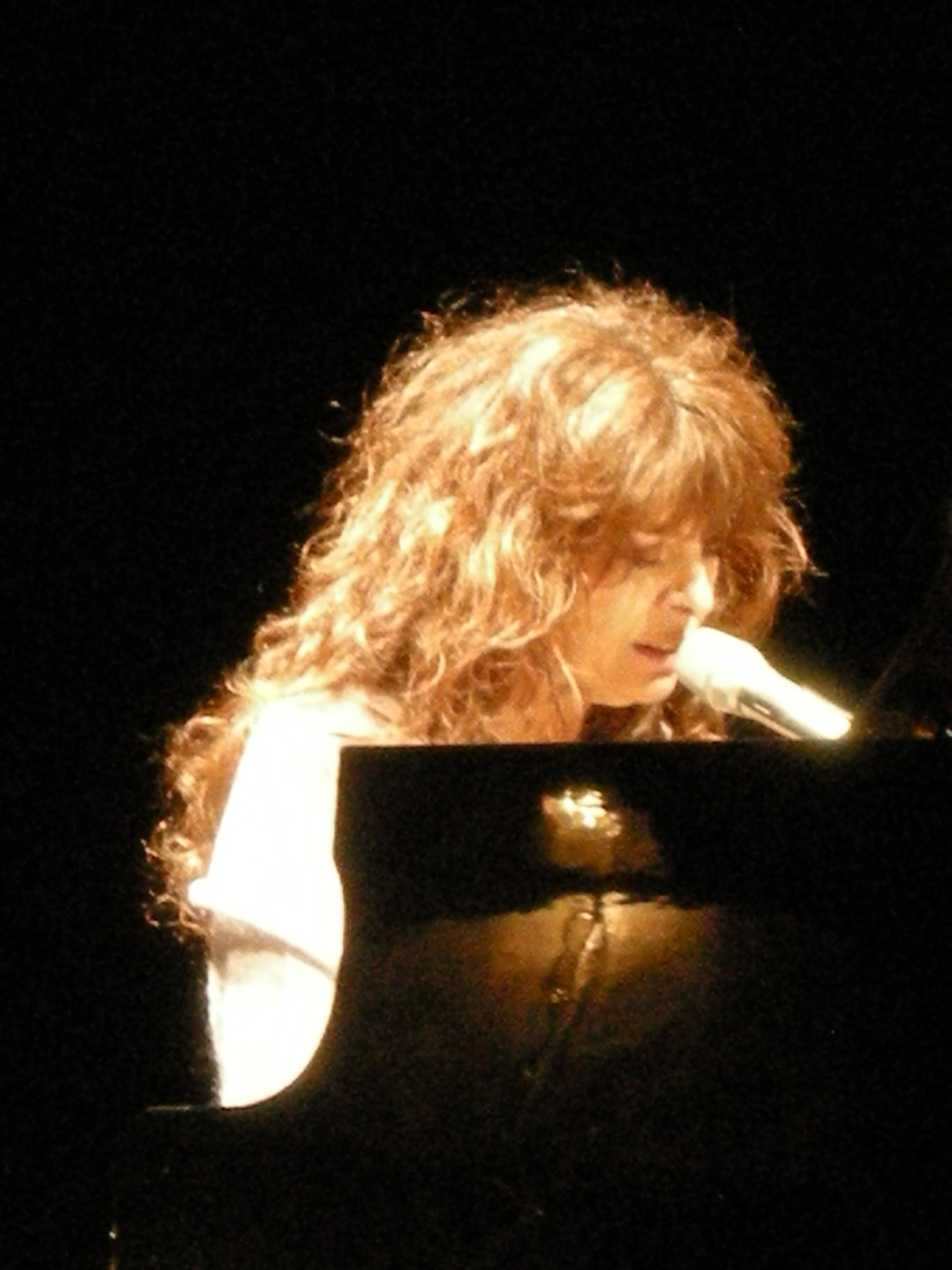
- Alice live in concert, 20 March 2009

Background information
- Also known as: Alice Visconti
- Born: Carla Bissi; 26 September 1954 (age 72); Forlì, Emilia-Romagna, Italy
- Genres: Vocal; pop; rock; classical; folk; experimental; ambient; electronica
- Occupation: Singer-songwriter
- Instruments: Vocals; piano; keyboards
- Years active: 1971–present
- Labels: CBS Records; EMI; Warner Bros. Records; NuN Music
- Website: www.alice-officialwebsite.com

Carla Bissi (born 26 September 1954), known professionally as Alice (Italian pronunciation: [aˈliːtʃe]) or Alice Visconti, is an Italian singer-songwriter and pianist who began her career in the early 1970s. After releasing three albums by the end of the decade, her breakthrough came in 1981 when she won the Sanremo Music Festival with the song "Per Elisa". This was followed by European hit singles like "Una notte speciale", "Messaggio", "Chan-son Egocentrique", "Prospettiva Nevski" and "Nomadi" and albums like Gioielli rubati, Park Hotel, Elisir, and Il sole nella pioggia which charted in Continental Europe, Scandinavia, and Japan.

In 1984, she represented Italy in the Eurovision Song Contest with "I treni di Tozeur", a duet with longtime collaborator Franco Battiato. In her more recent career, Alice has explored a diverse range of musical genres including classical, jazz, electronica and ambient, and has collaborated with a large number of renowned English and American musicians. Her latest album Samsara was released in 2012.

== Biography ==
=== Early career (1970s) ===
Born in Forlì, Alice started taking piano lessons in the local Conservatory and singing privately at the age of eight. Her career in music started at age 17 when she participated in the 1971 Castrocaro Music Festival under her birth name. She went on to win the contest with an interpretation of the song "Tanta voglia di lei", originally composed and recorded by classic Italian rock band Pooh.

The following year saw her winning another music award, La gondola d'argento in Venice, with the song "La festa mia" as well as making her debut in the important Sanremo Music Festival performing "Il mio cuore se ne va" in the Newcomers category, also released as her debut single; however, the song failed to qualify for the finals. Two further singles on the Carosello label credited under her birth name Carla Bissi followed in 1972 and 1973, both going relatively unnoticed by Italian audiences.

In 1975 she quit her day job at a design studio and took the stage name Alice Visconti as she was signed by the Italian subsidiary of CBS Records and released her debut album La mia poca grande età. The album consisted of material written by some of Italy's most successful composers and lyricists of the era and among the musicians contributing were, in fact, members of Pooh. The singles "Piccola anima" and "Io voglio vivere", both in the fairly traditional Italian easy listening genre, became minor chart successes in late 1975 and early 1976, the latter also a modest hit in France.

A second album on CBS followed in late 1977, Cosa resta... Un fiore, recorded with the same team of producers, composers and musicians as the debut, including the singles "...E respiro" and "Un'isola" which also met with moderate commercial success.

=== Commercial breakthrough (1980s) ===
==== Capo Nord ====
In late 1979, shortly after her contract with CBS had expired, Alice met a man with whom she would go on to collaborate for the next three decades with great success: the experimental, unconventional and highly productive composer and singer Franco Battiato, who was just on the verge of having his Italian breakthrough in the pop genre with the album L'era del cinghiale bianco, released in 1979. Battiato secured Alice a contract with his label EMI, and the two began working together with his producer Angelo Carrara on what was to become her first proper hit single, the dark and despairing "Il vento caldo dell'estate" ("The Warm Summer Wind") and the following album Capo Nord ("North Cape"). Co-written and arranged by Battiato, the album saw Alice making a dramatic change in musical direction as it combined influences from contemporary rock and new wave and a musical landscape with prominent use of synthesizers and distorted electric guitars. At this time, she also dropped the Visconti part of her stage name, and the Capo Nord album was the first to be credited simply as Alice. The album also marked her debut as a composer, with her writing the majority of the songs and over the course of the following albums she would become increasingly involved in the production of her music, both as composer, lyricist, musical arranger and sound engineer.

==== Per Elisa ====
In early 1981, Alice returned to the Sanremo Music Festival with the song "Per Elisa", composed by herself, Franco Battiato and his longtime co-writer, classical violinist Giusto Pio. The song was both lyrically and musically a modern paraphrase of Ludwig van Beethoven's "Für Elise", but it was by no means an archetypal sentimental Sanremo ballad. The rough rock track had lyrics which dealt with jealousy, betrayal, anger and revenge. For the live performance at the contest, she made full use of her vocal strength and range; one of the singer's trademarks is the exceptionally low register of her contralto voice. "Per Elisa" is also partly sung in falsetto and thus covers close to four octaves. The unorthodox entry and Alice's delivery of the song while dressed in tight jeans and a leather jacket made a strong impression on both the juries and the TV audiences; "Per Elisa" won the contest, becoming one of the first up-tempo rock tracks to do so, and it became her commercial breakthrough, not only in Italy but also in the rest of Continental Europe, becoming a Top 10 hit also in Switzerland and Austria and most other parts of Western Europe, including Scandinavia. An album titled Alice followed a few months later (released as Per Elisa outside Italy), including the follow-up single "Una notte speciale" ("A Special Night"), and the same year Bissi set out on her first European tour.

==== Azimut – Falsi allarmi ====
The following years saw the release of the albums Azimut (Azimuth) and Falsi allarmi, again mainly composed by Bissi herself, but also including further songwriting collaborations with Battiato and Giusto Pio. Both produced by Angelo Carrara, the albums spun off further popular single releases like "Messaggio" ("Message"), the nonsensical French/Italian/German/English language "Chan-son Egocentrique" ("Self-centred Song", a duet with Battiato), "A cosa pensano" ("What Are They Thinking"), "Notte a Roma" ("Night in Rome"), "Solo un'idea" ("Just a Thought") and "Il profumo del silenzio" ("The Scent of Silence"). These became especially successful in West Germany, which led to her recording the German/Italian language duet "Zu nah am Feuer" with singer Stefan Waggershausen in late 1983; an English/Italian version was later also released in certain territories under the title "Close to the Fire". The single, which sold nearly a million copies in West Germany alone, was also a number one in Switzerland and Austria. The duet made her one of the best-selling Italian artists on the German-speaking markets of the mid-1980s, and it has been said that she at this stage of her career even sold more records in these countries, the Benelux and Scandinavia than in her native Italy.

==== I treni di Tozeur ====
In May 1984, Alice and Franco Battiato represented Italy in the Eurovision Song Contest with the for its genre highly unconventional song "I treni di Tozeur" ("The trains of Tozeur"), again composed by Battiato, Giusto Pio and lyricist Rosario Cosentino. The mid-tempo synth-driven ballad was based around a very brief excerpt from Wolfgang Amadeus Mozart's opera The Magic Flute and was performed on stage in Luxembourg with three classically trained mezzo-sopranos. Despite being tipped to win and arguably the best reception from the audiences on the night as well as receiving the coveted "twelve points", the full mark, from countries as diverse as Spain and Finland, Alice and Battiato lost out to the Swedish song "Diggi-Loo Diggi-Ley", and finished 5th out of 19 entries. "I treni di Tozeur" however became that year's bestselling entry in Continental Europe, and paradoxically enough also a Top 20 hit in Sweden. The song is also, in fact, one of the very few Italian Eurovision entries ever to become a commercial success in Italy itself – even topping the Italian singles chart, and some twenty-five years later it still remains the best-selling single in Bissi's career to date. Both Alice and Battiato have since recorded several solo interpretations of "I treni di Tozeur", both with contemporary and classical arrangements, and the song also appears on the CD set of Eurovision Winners and Classics produced to coincide with the Congratulations 50th Anniversary special of late 2005 as well as on the accompanying DVD.

==== Gioielli rubati ====
In 1985 Alice followed up the success of the "I treni di Tozeur" single with a full-length tribute album entitled Gioielli rubati – Alice canta Battiato (Stolen Jewels – Alice Sings Battiato), including nine of the composer's best-known songs. Angelo Carrara's production of the album, recorded in Milan and mixed at The Power Station Studios in New York City, accentuated Battiato's influences from classical masters such as Johann Sebastian Bach, Mozart and Johannes Brahms by juxtaposing modern sequencer-programmed synthesizers and drum machines against a classically arranged string section, just like in the case of "I treni di Tozeur" courtesy of the opera house La Scala in Milan. The album's opening track "Prospettiva Nevski", minutely detailing a cold winter's day at Saint Petersburg's Nevsky Prospect in the early twentieth century, became Alice's best-selling solo single in Continental Europe and Scandinavia since her breakthrough with "Per Elisa" and was followed by "Summer on a Solitary Beach", "Il Re del Mondo" ("The King of the World") and "Luna indiana" ("Indian Moon", loosely based on Beethoven's "Moonlight Sonata") and introduced Battiato's music to a wider European audience. In Italy, the Gioielli rubati album won Alice the award Targa Tenco for Best Interpretation the following year.

==== Park Hotel ====
In 1986 Bissi changed musical direction as she returned to the charts with the album Park Hotel, her first project with keyboardist, arranger and producer Francesco Messina, with whom she was to collaborate extensively over the next two decades. The album which included material co-written by Bissi herself, Messina, as well as prolific Italian lyricist, composer and singer Juri Camisasca was also Bissi's first proper international venture as it was entirely recorded with a four-piece band consisting of Italian keyboardist Michele Fedrigotti plus three internationally acknowledged and highly influential musicians: American bassist Tony Levin, American drummer Jerry Marotta and British guitarist Phil Manzanera. The album was notably different from the preceding "I treni di Tozeur" and Gioielli rubati, as it mainly focused on blues-tinged, melancholy and suggestive ballads with airy soundscapes giving plenty of room for the musicians to display their respective talents and for Bissi to use her vocal skills in a new musical environment. Park Hotel was promoted by lead single "Nomadi" ("Nomads"), an epic ballad by Camisasca, followed by "Il senso dei desideri" ("The Sense of Desire"), "Viali di solitudine" ("The Boulevards of the Lonely"), "Volo di notte" ("Fly by Night") and a remix of the up-tempo track "Conoscersi" ("Knowing Yourself"). Park Hotel was a considerable success both critically and commercially, reaching the Top 20 in most parts of Continental Europe, peaking at No. 13 on the Swedish albums chart and it also became her breakthrough on the Japanese market, despite the fact that all lyrics were still entirely sung in the Italian language.

==== Elisir ====
A tour in Continental Europe and Scandinavia followed in 1987 on which Bissi performed tracks from the Park Hotel album alongside reworked arrangements of songs from her earlier repertoire; the romantic "Una notte speciale" became an up-tempo rock track, breakthrough single "Il vento caldo dell'estate" was given an updated synthesizer and drum-machine treatment while songs like "La Mano", "Rumbarock" (retitled "Hispavox") and "Notte a Roma" were performed unplugged with acoustic guitars and sparse percussion. After the completion of the tour six of these interpretations were recorded in studio and released on the album Elisir, which also included two previously unreleased songs, the opening track "Nuvole" ("Clouds") and a cover version of Lennon and McCartney's "The Fool on the Hill", released as the lead single. Elisir was later awarded the prestigious prize Goldene Europa for sales on the German-speaking markets. In Japan the album was released under the title Kusamakura (Grass Pillow) and then included the new recording "Le scogliere di Dover" ("The cliffs of Dover"), with which Alice participated in the World Popular Song Festival in Tokyo in early 1988.

==== Mélodie Passagère ====
Musically and vocally versatile and unwilling to be categorised or defined, 1988 saw Bissi setting out on a low-key tour in smaller venues and classical concert halls in Italy and Switzerland accompanied solely by herself and Michele Fedrigotti on pianos and keyboards, performing not her pop hits but arias and lieder by fin de siècle composers Gabriel Fauré, Erik Satie and Maurice Ravel. The partly instrumental concert was later recorded in studio and released as Mélodie passagère on EMI.

==== Il sole nella pioggia ====
In 1989 Bissi returned with another pop album, Il sole nella pioggia (The Sun in the Rain), which was proof of further musical development and evolution as it was clearly influenced by contemporary British artists in the experimental and alternative rock genres such as Peter Gabriel, Kate Bush and David Sylvian and among the all-star line up of musicians contributing to the project were in fact several who previously had collaborated with these: drummer Steve Jansen and keyboardist Richard Barbieri, guitarist Dave Gregory, trumpeter and multi-instrumentalist Jon Hassell, Turkish flutist Kudsi Erguner as well as the Italian trumpeter and flugelhorn jazz player Paolo Fresu. The album closes with the English-language track "Now and Forever", a duet with British progressive rock singer-songwriter Peter Hammill. The main part of the songs were collaborations between Juri Camisasca and pianist, violinist and composer Marco Liverani including lead single "Visioni" ("Visions"), follow-up and title track "Il sole nella pioggia", "Tempo senza tempo" ("Time Without Time") and "Le ragazze di Osaka" ("The Girls in Osaka"). Side two of the original vinyl album however opened with a multilayered a cappella interpretation of the medieval French folk song "Orléans" on which Alice again showed her vocal capability by singing all harmonies covering four octaves, followed by the acoustic "Anìn A Grîs" sung in the Friulian language. Il sole nella pioggia also included a reworking of the track "Le scogliere di Dover", originally released on the Japanese Kusamakura album, provided with new lyrics and retitled "I cieli del nord" ("The Skies of the North"). The album consolidated her position as one of Italy's leading artists and was followed by another successful European concert tour.

=== Experiments (1990s) ===
==== Mezzogiorno sulle Alpi ====
After a three-year absence from the music scene, Bissi returned with the album Mezzogiorno sulle Alpi ("Noon in the Alps") in 1992, her most experimental and mature work to date, again recorded with a number of distinguished international musicians such as Steve Jansen, Richard Barbieri, Dave Gregory, Paolo Fresu as well as double bass player Danny Thompson, drummer Gavin Harrison and bassist Jakko Jakszyk.

Mezzogiorno sulle Alpi displayed Bissi's effort to steer away from being a commercially oriented Mediterranean pop act to a much more ambitious performer and marked an increasing expansion into electronics, expressed in colourful synth sounds, occasional drum loops and subdued ambient passages as well as influences from contemporary jazz. The material was mainly co-written by Bissi and producer Francesco Messina with contributions from Richard Barbieri, Paolo Fresu and Rosario Cosentino, but the album also included an English-language cover version of Tim Buckley's "Blue Melody" and lead single "In viaggio sul tuo viso" incorporates the Hungarian folk melody "Istenem Istenem".

Despite receiving generally positive reviews from music critics and a following sold-out European concert tour, the Mezzogiorno sulle Alpi album itself was only a moderate commercial success.

==== Art et Décoration ====
The years 1993 and 1994 saw Bissi embarking on the tour project Art et Décoration with the Arturo Toscanini Symphony Orchestra, interpreting works by composers such as Reynaldo Hahn, Charles Ives, Maurice Ravel, Xavier Montsalvatge, Geni Sadero, Gabriel Fauré, Ivor Gurney, Camille Saint-Saëns, and Heitor Villa-Lobos. Unlike Mélodie passagère, the Art et Décoration project was not recorded by EMI and still remains unreleased.

==== Charade ====
In 1995, Bissi signed a five-year contract with the WEA/Warner Music label and released another pop album, both musically and lyrically introspective and contemplative Charade, featuring contributions from musicians like King Crimson's Trey Gunn, several tracks with British improvisational solo violinist and arranger Stuart Gordon and acoustic tracks with the American/Belgian/Japanese California Guitar Trio. Charade, which included single releases "Dammi la mano amore" ("Give Me Your Hand, My Love") and "Non ero mai sola" ("I Was Never Alone"), was very much in the same vein as 1992's Mezzogiorno sulle Alpi but further developed the use of minimalist ambient/avant-garde backgrounds, with fractured guitars and woodwind, muted trumpets and accordion set against programmed TR-808 rhythms, influenced by contemporary dance music genres like electronica and trance, fused with world music samples and looped vocals, but again with the main focus on the esoteric and evocative lyrics.

On the following European Charade tour in 1996, Bissi performed with a four-piece band consisting of Robby Aceto (The Club, Talking Heads, David Sylvian etc.) on electric and acoustic guitars, former No-Man member Ben Coleman on violin and the two ex-Japan members Steve Jansen on drums and Mick Karn on bass guitar and bass clarinet. After fifteen years of alternately composing, recording, promoting her work in the media as well as extensive touring, the Charade Tour marked Bissi's final major European concert venture.

Later in 1996, she appeared as singer and co-writer on Trey Gunn's solo album The Third Star, performing the title track. In 1997 she and producer Francesco Messina, Gavin Harrison and Juri Camisasca among others (Stefano Battaglia, Bruno Romani, etc.) were part of the collaborative crossover/ambient/fusion project Devogue, with Bissi singing lead vocals on five of the thirteen titles, two of which in fact were ambient dub remixes of tracks from her own studio albums. Later that same year she teamed up with Italian progressive rock band Bluvertigo for the duet "Troppe emozioni" ("Too Many Emotions"), included on their album Metallo non-metallo.

==== Exit ====
In 1998 Bissi released Exit, her most pop-oriented and melodic studio album since the late 1980s, again clearly influenced by urban dance music genres like electronica and contemporary R&B; or as Allmusic wrote in their review "the album often suggests Sarah McLachlan in a duet with Enigma". The album spawned three single releases, "I Am a Taxi", "Dimmi di sì" ("Tell me yes") and "Open Your Eyes", an English/Italian language R&B duet with Skye Edwards, lead singer of British trip hop band Morcheeba. The promo video of the latter shows the two singers performing the track sitting in a rowing boat on a sunny summer's day in London's Hyde Park. Exit also includes a second duet with Bluvertigo's Morgan, "L'immagine" ("The Images"), and closes with a cover version of French singer-songwriter Leo Ferré's "L'Etranger" ("The Stranger"), with lyrics based on a poem by influential French nineteenth century poet, critic and translator Charles Baudelaire.

==== God Is My DJ ====
1999 saw Bissi on another small-scale tour project with a six-piece acoustic band, exploring and interpreting sacred and spiritual – but not exclusively religious – music, performing in smaller venues and churches in the North of Italy. God Is My DJ, which was also recorded and released by Warner Music, comprised works by composers as diverse as Arvo Pärt, David Crosby, Popol Vuh, Eleni Karaindrou, Gavin Bryars, Franco Battiato and Jane Siberry, French, Hungarian and Livonian traditional songs, as well as 11th and 14th century hymns sung in Ancient Greek and Latin.

=== New projects (2000–2005) ===
==== Personal Jukebox ====
In the Spring of 2000, Bissi returned to the Sanremo music festival, twenty-eight years after her debut with "Il mio cuore se ne va" and nineteen years after the victory with "Per Elisa", and this time in the category for established artists. The song she performed, Juri Camisasca's "Il giorno dell'indipendenza" ("The Day of Independence"), qualified for the finals and finished in an honourable ninth place and was also the opening track on the career retrospective Personal Jukebox. The album contained four single tracks from 1998's Exit and 1995's Charade, the original versions of "Visioni" from 1989's Il sole nella pioggia and "In Viaggio Sul Tuo Viso" from 1992's Mezzogiorno sulle Alpi as well as new interpretations of tracks from her early repertoire, including "Chanson Egocentrique" (another duet with Bluvertigo), "Prospettiva Nevski", "A cosa pensano", "Nomadi", "Il vento caldo dell'estate", a technofied take on "Per Elisa" and an orchestral solo version of "I treni di Tozeur". "Il Giorno dell'indipendenza" was one of three new recordings, the other two being "Tutto è niente" ("All Is Nothing") and an Italian-language cover version of David Bowie/Pat Metheny Group's "This is Not America".

==== Viaggio in Italia ====
In 2001 Bissi launched the tour project Le parole del giorno prima (Words of the past day), an homage to some of Italy's foremost cantautori, singer-songwriters and lyricists, including Ivano Fossati, Fabrizio De André, Francesco De Gregori, Pier Paolo Pasolini, Franco Battiato and Giorgio Gaber, mainly covering material from the 1970s and the early 1980s but interpreted with contemporary musical arrangements and an emphasis on the lyrical qualities of the songs.

The project was marred by further problems with record companies but eventually evolved into Viaggio in Italia (a title shared with Goethe's "Italian Journey" and Rossellini's "Journey to Italy"), released in 2003 on the independent label NuN. The album opens with a solo interpretation of the new composition "Come un sigillo" with music by Battiato and lyrics by philosopher Manlio Sgalambro, originally recorded as a duet with the composer on his 2002 album Fleurs 3. The Viaggio in Italia album brought Alice back to the Top 20 in Italy, peaking at No. 16 in September 2003.

=== Recent career (2006–present) ===
In recent years, Bissi has periodically toured with the project Lungo La Strada (Along the Road) with Steve Jansen, Marco Pancaldi and Alberto Tafuri, performing in both classical auditoriums, churches and concert halls in Italy. A recording of a concert at Basilica San Marco, Milan, in 2006, was released in 2009 as Lungo la Strada Live.

== EMI aftermath ==
After the comparatively low sales of albums Mélodie Passagère – Alice Canta Satie, Fauré & Ravel (1988) and Mezzogiorno Sulle Alpi (1992), the EMI label declined to release or even record the 1993/1994 project Art et Décoration with the Arturo Toscanini Symphony Orchestra. Instead, they released a greatest hits compilation in 1994 entitled Il vento caldo dell'estate, taking its title from the artist's first Italian hit single and mainly focussing on material recorded in the early 1980s. The compilation was issued without the knowledge or approval of Bissi herself. The hits package included a Euro disco remix of the 1982 track "Chan-son Egocentrique", originally a duet with Franco Battiato. The remixed version of the track, also released as a 12" single, omitted all lines sung by the composer himself – again, this was done without the knowledge or approval of either Bissi or Battiato. The two subsequently considered taking legal action against the label to have the compilation and the remix single withdrawn – only to find that they legally had no control over the use of their respective bodies of work recorded for EMI. This subsequently led to both artists leaving the label after a fifteen-year-long and highly successful collaboration.

Bissi's contract, however, stipulated that she was to deliver one final studio album to the label before the end of 1995. As a compromise, she agreed to take part in the production of another hits compilation, this time under her supervision. Unlike the first version, Viaggiatrice solitaria covered tracks from all eras of her career on EMI, including selections from her then more recent works Mezzogiorno sulle Alpi and Il sole nella pioggia. The remix of "Chan-son Egocentrique" was omitted from the track list. Despite this, the 1994 collection – including the unapproved disco remix without Battiato's vocals – still remains in print, some fifteen years later.

After Bissi's parting ways with EMI, the label and its Dutch mid-price subsidiary Disky Communications have continued to capitalise on the rights to her back catalogue, issuing a large number of hits compilations in various price ranges under titles like I grandi successi di Alice, Collezione, Le signore della canzone, Made in Italy, Studio Collection, The Best of Alice, Collezione Italiana, etc., again mainly including early 1980s hits. The year of 2006 alone saw EMI releasing no less than four of these best of packages in Continental Europe, Scandinavia and Japan.

Bissi's following five-year tenure on the Warner Music label has also resulted in the release of unapproved compilations. 2006 saw the label issuing a greatest hits package entitled Le Più Belle Canzoni Di Alice, paradoxically and confusingly exactly the same title as one of the four EMI compilations released the very same year, which includes seven tracks recorded for the CBS label in 1975 and 1977 coupled with some of her best-known 80s hits such as "Per Elisa", "Prospettiva Nevski" and "Nomadi", the latter are however not the original versions but re-recordings dating from the 2000 album Personal Jukebox, which the compilation fails to mention in its liner notes.

== Discography ==
=== Studio albums ===
==== Carla Bissi ====
- "Il mio cuore se ne va" / "Un giorno nuovo" (1972, single)
- "La festa mia" / "Fai tutto tu" (1972, single)
- "Il giorno dopo" / "Vivere un po' morire un po'" (1973, single)

==== Alice Visconti ====
- La mia poca grande età (1975)
- Cosa resta... Un fiore (1978)

==== Alice ====
- Capo Nord (1980)
- Alice (released under the title Per Elisa in certain countries; 1981)
- Azimut (1982)
- Falsi allarmi (1983)
- Gioielli rubati (1985)
- Park Hotel (1986)
- Elisir (1987)
- Mélodie passagère (1988)
- Il sole nella pioggia (1989)
- Mezzogiorno sulle Alpi (1992)
- Charade (1995)
- Exit (1998)
- God Is My DJ (1999)
- Personal Jukebox (2000)
- Viaggio in Italia (2003)
- Samsara (2012)
- Weekend (2014)
- Eri con me: Sedici canzoni di Franco Battiato (2022)

=== Live Albums ===
- Lungo la Strada Live (2009)
- Live in Roma (Franco Battiato e Alice) (2016)

=== Compilations ===
- Mi chiamo Alice (1979)
- Alice (1984)
- Alice (1986)
- Kusamakura (Japan, 1988)
- Il vento caldo dell'estate (1994)
- Viaggiatrice solitaria (1995)
- Alice canta Battiato (1997)
- I primi passi (1998)
- I grandi successi di Alice (The Netherlands; 2000)
- Collezione (2001, copy protected, track listing identical to I grandi successi di Alice, alternative cover art)
- Le signore della canzone (2003, copy protected)
- Made in Italy (2004, copy protected)
- Studio Collection (2005, 2 CDs, copy protected)
- The Best of Alice (2005; copy protected, track listing identical to disc 1 of Studio Collection)
- Le più belle canzoni di Alice (2006, EMI, copy protected)
- Le più belle canzoni di Alice (2006, Warner Music)
- Collezione italiana (2006, 2 CDs, copy protected, track listing identical to Studio Collection, alternative cover art)
- D.O.C. (2006, copy protected)
- The Best Of – Platinum (2007)
- Solo Grandi Successi: Alice (2007)
- Per Elisa: The Capitol Collection (2008)
- Made in Italy (2009, re-issue, track listing identical to I grandi successi di Alice and Collezione, alternative cover art)
- Alice: The Best of Platinum (2009)
- Per Elisa: The Capitol Collection (2009, re-issue, slidepack)
- Capo Nord / Alice (2011, 2 CD's, digipack)
- Alice canta Battiato / Park Hotel (2012, 2 CD's, digipack)
- Made in Italy – New Version (2012, second re-issue, track listing identical to I grandi successi di Alice, Collezione & Made in Italy, alternative cover art)
- Essential (2012)
- The Platinum Collection (2012, 3 CDs)

== Collaborations and guest appearances ==
- Stefan Waggershausen: Tabu (1984, duet on track "Zu Nah Am Feuer", extended mix also released on 12" single, English version "Close to the Fire" released as 7" single and included on album Falsi allarmi in several countries)
- Franco Battiato & Alice: "I treni di Tozeur"/"Le biciclette di Forli" (1984, duet single and Eurovision Song Contest entry )
- Claudio Rocchi: Claudio Rocchi (1984, duet on track "L'umana nostalgia")
- Quando... Tributo a Luigi Tenco (1994, tribute album, lead vocals on track "Se sapessi come fai")
- Tributo ad Augusto (1995, tribute album, lead vocals and keyboards on track "L'auto corre lontano, ma io corro da te")
- Trey Gunn: The Third Star (1996, co-writer and lead vocals on title track "The Third Star")
- Bluvertigo: Metallo non-metallo (1997, duet on track "Troppe emozioni")
- Devogue: Devogue (1997, lead vocals on tracks "Midnight Bells", "In piedi su uno specchio", "Le Condizioni del tempo a.m.", "Palmenhaus" and "Il cielo sopra il cielo")
- Franco Battiato: Fleurs 3 (2002, duet on track "Come un sigillo")
- Voli improvedibili – Tributo a Franco Battiato (2004, tribute album, lead vocals on track "È stato molto bello")
- Zerouno: Zerouno (2004, lead vocals on track "Sospesa")

== Sources and external links ==
- Official Homepage
- Rockol.it biography
- Ondarock.it biography
- Musica Italiana biography
- RAI Uno biography
- Radio Italia biography
- Tempo Senza Tempo, biography, news, concert dates
- Alicewebsite.it biography
- Allmusic discography
- Lavocedelledonnet.it
- Siebenpunkt Verlags biography
- Aliceweb biography
- Alicesito biography
- Alice's page on Europopmusic.eu (English)
- Cinzaricci.it biography
- La Casa Degli Elfi biography
- Playmusic.it biography
- San Remo Story biography
- Web.de biography
- Hit Parade Italia, Italian charts site
- Stefan Waggershausen, official site, biography
- Alicefans.se
- Discogs.com discography

Awards and achievements
Preceded by Toto Cutugno with "Solo noi"	Sanremo Music Festival; Winner; 1981	Succeeded by Riccardo Fogli with "Storie di tutti i giorni"
Preceded by Riccardo Fogli with "Per Lucia"	Italy in the Eurovision Song Contest; 1984	Succeeded by Al Bano & Romina Power with "Magic Oh Magic"
