= Mondi lontanissimi =

Studio album by Franco Battiato
- Released: 12 April 1985
- Recorded: 1985
- Genre: Pop rock
- Length: 29:39
- Label: EMI Italiana
- Producer: Franco Battiato

Franco Battiato chronology
Orizzonti perduti (1983)	Mondi lontanissimi (1985)	Echoes of Sufi Dances (1985)

Singles from Mondi lontanissimi
- 1. "I treni di Tozeur" Released: 1984; 2. "No Time No Space" Released: 1985; 3. "Il re del mondo" Released: 1985; 4. "Via Lattea" Released: 1985; 5. "L'animale" Released: 1985

Mondi lontanissimi (transl. Very distant worlds) is an album by Italian singer-songwriter Franco Battiato, released by EMI Italiana on 12 April 1985.

== Overview ==
The central theme of most of the songs on the album is travelling, either on Earth or in space; for example "Via Lattea", "No Time No Space" and "I treni di Tozeur" speak of astronauts, telescopes and spaceships. "Temporary Road" is a song about drivers who sit in their cars in traffic jams every day, a slow first part in English and a second part in Italian. "Il re del mondo" is an older song, inspired by René Guenon's theories, released again in a re-arranged version.

Also in 1985, Battiato re-recorded the songs "No Time No Space", "Temporary Road", "Il re del mondo", "Chan-son egocentrique" (first recorded by Alice on her 1982 album Azimut), "I treni di Tozeur" and "L'animale", translated into English on his album Echoes of Sufi Dances and into Spanish on Ecos de danzas sufi.

"I treni di Tozeur" was originally performed by Battiato and his female colleague Alice in the Eurovision Song Contest 1984, gaining the 5th place in a field of 19. On Mondi lontanissimi Battiato sings this song by himself.

== Track listing ==
Side A

1. "Via Lattea" (Franco Battiato) - 4:50
2. "Risveglio di Primavera" (Battiato, Giusto Pio) - 3:29
3. "No Time No Space" (Battiato, Pio, Saro Cosentino) - 3:25
4. "Personal computer" (Battiato, Cosentino) - 2:38

Side B

1. "Temporary Road" (Battiato, Pio) - 2:47
2. "Il re del mondo" (Battiato) - 3:26
3. "Chan-son egocentrique" (Francesco Messina, Battiato, Tommaso Tramonti) - 4:12
4. "I treni di Tozeur" (Battiato, Pio, Cosentino) - 3:07
5. "L'animale" (Battiato) - 3:18

== Personnel ==
- Filippo Destrieri - Keyboards
- Gianfrando D'Adda - Drums
- Alberto Radius - Guitars
- Alfredo Riccardi - Cello
- Marilyn Turner - Lyric voice
- Lino Vaccina - Tabla

== Charts ==
=== Weekly charts ===
Weekly chart performance for Mondi lontanissimi
Chart (1985)	Peak position
Italian Albums (Hit Parade)	3

=== Year-end charts ===
Year-end chart performance for Mondi lontanissimi
Chart (1985)	Position
Italian Albums (Hit Parade)	23
