= Cuccurucucù =

- cover of the French single

Single by Franco Battiato

from the album La voce del padrone
- Language: Italian; English
- B-side: "Segnali di vita"
- Released: 1981
- Genre: Pop rock; synth pop; new wave
- Length: 4:09
- Label: EMI Italiana
- Songwriters: Franco Battiato; Giusto Pio
- Producer: Angelo Carrara

Audio
- "Cuccurucucù" on YouTube

"Cuccurucucù" is a 1981 song by Italian singer-songwriter Franco Battiato, from his best-selling album La voce del padrone.

== Background ==
The song's lyrics consists of fragments of memories of Battiato's youth, even if some biographical verses were eventually modified and adjusted for metric and sound purposes, eg. istituto magistrale replacing liceo classico.

The title as well as the refrain and part of the melody are citations of Tomás Méndez' "Cucurrucucú paloma". The song also includes citations and references to other songs which marked Battiato's adolescence, including Bob Dylan's "Just Like a Woman" and "Like a Rolling Stone", The Beatles' "Lady Madonna" and "With a Little Help from My Friends", The Rolling Stones' "Ruby Tuesday" (which Battiato will eventually cover in his album Fleurs), Mina's "Le mille bolle blu", Nicola Di Bari's "Il mondo è grigio, il mondo è blu", and Milva's "Il mare nel cassetto". Lyrics also contain citations from Homer's poem Iliad, in Vincenzo Monti's Italian translation. American soprano Marilyn Turner and, uncredited, Giuni Russo, serve as backing vocalists. The song was released as a single in some foreign territories, notably in Switzerland, where it charted. The song was described by Italian writer Michele Serra as 'a dadaist scherzo'.

== Charts ==
Chart (1982)	Peak position
Switzerland (Schweizer Hitparade)	11

== Certifications ==
Region	Certification	Certified units/sales
Italy (FIMI) Sales from 2009	Platinum	100,000^{‡}
^{‡} Sales+streaming figures based on certification alone.
