= Finardi =

Finardi is an Italian surname. Notable people with the surname include:

- Eugenio Finardi (born 1952), Italian rock singer, songwriter, guitarist and keyboardist
- Luciano Finardi (born 1966), Brazilian fencer
- Sebastiano Finardi (born 2001), Italian professional footballer

== See also ==
- Finarda
