= Up Patriots to Arms =

- Screenshot from the music video

Song by Franco Battiato

from the album Patriots
- Released: 1980
- Length: 5:03
- Songwriters: Franco Battiato, Giusto Pio

Music video
- "Up Patriots to Arms" on YouTube

"Up Patriots to Arms" is a 1980 song by Franco Battiato from his album Patriots.

== Overview ==
Battiato got inspiration for the song from a manifesto he had seen in a Birmingham pub in 1975. The song opens with a citation of the Richard Wagner's Tannhäuser overture, that Battiato had already used in his 1977 stage play Baby Sitter. The lyrics include citations from Nomadi's "Come potete giudicar" and from Bixio-Cherubini classic "Lucciole Vagabonde". The song has been described as "an invective against the latent stupidity that characterizes mankind", touching on topics such as politics, science, and contemporary music.

In 2011, Battiato recorded a new version of the song with Subsonica, which was released as a single and included in the band's album Eden. Artists who covered the song also include Luca Carboni, Max Gazzè, Negrita and Disciplinatha.

== Charts ==
Subsonica feat. Franco Battiato version

Chart (2011–2012)	Peak position
Italy (FIMI)	26
Italy Airplay (EarOne)	16

== Certifications ==
Region	Certification	Certified units/sales
Italy (FIMI)	Gold	15,000^{‡}
^{‡} Sales+streaming figures based on certification alone.
