= Patriots (album) =

Studio album by Franco Battiato
- Released: 1980
- Length: 28:58
- Label: EMI Italiana
- Producer: Angelo Carrara

Franco Battiato chronology
L'era del cinghiale bianco (1979)	Patriots (1980)	La voce del padrone (1981)

Patriots is the tenth studio album by Italian singer-songwriter Franco Battiato, released in 1980.

== Production ==
The album had initially as working title I telegrafi del Martedì Grasso ('The Mardi Gras Telegraphs'), before Battiato decided opting for a fragment of the title of the lead single "Up Patriots to Arms". It was recorded in Alberto Radius' studios in Milan in July 1980. The cover art was realized by Francesco Messina and photographer Roberto Masotti. In the back cover, Messina wrote a long text, Preghiera del giovane patriota ('Prayer of the young patriot'), which is considered the artistic manifesto of Battiato's music of the period.

== Release ==
The album was released in October 1980. In 2010, it was released Patriots - 30th Anniversary Edition, which included four bonus tracks and the music video of "Up Patriots to Arms". In 2021, Patriots - 40th Anniversary Edition was released; it included three different bonus tracks, the Spanish and English versions of "Up Patriots to Arms" and the Spanish version of "Prospettiva Nevski".

== Reception ==
The album was described as "a conjunction link between the previous album and the following one, even if it cannot be considered simply a transitional album. All the aspects that would become peculiar to the Battiato of these years are brought into focus there", notably the use of fragmented lyrics, which incorporate references and citations from low and high culture, the use of foreign languages, and the use of irony. Patrizio Ruviglioni from Rolling Stone Italia referred to it as "an avant-garde work in its day, which was misunderstood, and then re-evaluated bit by bit as a small Battiato classic".

== Track listing ==
Patriots track listing
No.	Title	Lyrics	Music	Length
1.	"Up Patriots to Arms"	Franco Battiato	Battiato, Giusto Pio	5:01
2.	"Venezia-Istanbul"	Battiato	Battiato, Pio	4:37
3.	"Le aquile"	Fleur Jaeggy	Battiato, Pio	4:10
4.	"Prospettiva Nevski"	Battiato	Battiato, Pio	3:56
5.	"Lunedì"	Battiato	Battiato, Pio	4:43
6.	"Arabian Song"	Battiato	Battiato, Pio	3:40
7.	"Passaggi a livello"	Battiato	Battiato, Pio	3:38
