= Falsi allarmi =

Studio album by Alice
- Released: 1983, 1984
- Recorded: 1983
- Genre: Pop, rock
- Length: 33:41
- Label: EMI
- Producer: Angelo Carrara

Alice chronology
| Azimut (1982) | Falsi allarmi (1983) | Alice (1984) |

Falsi allarmi is the sixth studio album by the Italian singer-songwriter Alice, released in 1983 by EMI Music.

The album includes the single releases "Il profumo del silenzio", "Carthago", "Solo un'idea" and "Notte a Roma".

After the chart success of the duet "Zu nah am Feuer" with the German singer Stefan Waggershausen in early 1984, the album was re-released in West Germany, Switzerland and Austria in spring that year with the duet added as a bonus track, placed as track B5. The Benelux editions of the re-release instead included the English-language version "Close to the Fire". In 2003, "Zu nah am Feuer" was included on Waggershausen's compilation Duette & Balladen.

After Alice's participation in the 1984 Eurovision Song Contest with another duet, "I treni di Tozeur" with Franco Battiato, Falsi allarmi was again re-released in the Benelux, and again with this bonus track as B5. The original duet version of the track has since been included on Eurovision compilations such as The Story of Eurovision, The Very Best of Eurovision and Grandes éxitos del Festival de Eurovision. The song also appears on the CD set of Eurovision Winners and Classics produced to coincide with the Congratulations 50th Anniversary special of late 2005 as well as on the accompanying DVD. A solo version with Battiato was included on his 1985 album Mondi lontanissimi and a classical interpretation with a symphony orchestra in 1994 on the live album Unprotected. Alice in turn recorded a solo version in 1987 on Elisir and again for the career retrospective Personal Jukebox in 2000, then with the London Session Orchestra, arranged and conducted by Gavin Wright.

An alternative version of the track "Notte a Roma" was also included on Elisir.

== Track listing ==
Side A

1. "Solo un'idea" (Alice, Matteo Fasolino, Alice) – 4:16
2. "Osanna" (Alice) – 3:25
3. "La canzone più bella" (Alice, Matteo Fasolino, Alice) – 5:07
4. "Viaggio" (Alice, Matteo Fasolino, Alice) – 4:10

Side B

1. "Il profumo del silenzio" (Alice, Matteo Fasolino, Alice) – 4:32
2. "Carthago" (Alice, Battiato, Matteo Fasolino) – 3:19
3. "Notte a Roma" (Alice) – 4:22
4. "Per favore non è amore" (Alice) – 4:30

== Personnel ==
- Alice – lead vocals, piano
- Alfredo Golino – drums, percussion instruments, marimba
- Mino Fabiano – bass guitar
- Matteo Fasolino – piano, synthesizer
- Pino Santapaga – guitars
- Sergio Farina – guitars
- Maurizio Preti – percussion
- Ricky Portera – guitar solo track A3
- Marco Dassenno – cello
- I Madrigalisti di Milano – choir track A2

== Production ==
- Angelo Carrara – record producer
- Alice – musical arranger, sound engineer
- Matteo Fasolino – musical arranger, sound engineer
- Alfredo Golino – musical arranger
- Recorded at Studio 7 Fontana
- Franco Zorzi – sound engineer
- Mixed at Idea Mix – CGD
- Olophonic Center: Maurizio & Umberto Maggi – holophonic effects
- Target – management
- Antonio Guccione – photography
- Francesco Messina – art direction
- EMI Creative Services – graphic design

== Charts ==
| Chart | Peak position |
|---|---|
| Italy (Hit Parade) | 16 |
