= Cosa resta... Un fiore =

Studio album by Alice
- Released: 1978
- Recorded: 1977
- Genre: Pop, vocal
- Label: CBS
- Producer: Giancarlo Lucariello

Alice chronology
La mia poca grande età (1975)	Cosa resta... Un fiore (1978)	Capo Nord (1980)

Cosa resta... Un fiore is the second studio album by Italian singer-songwriter Alice, released under the stage name 'Alice Visconti' in 1978 on CBS Records.

The track "Io voglio vivere", which had been a minor hit in 1975, was again included on this album, and a Spanish-language version entitled "Dices que he sido infiel" was also released in Spain. Both were again moderately successful and "Dices que he sido infiel" remains the one and only Castilian recording in Alice's career to date.

The Cosa resta... Un fiore album was re-released on CD in Japan in 2006 in Warner Music's European Rock Collection series.

== Track listing ==
Side A

1. "Un fiore" (Luigi Lopez, Carla Vistarini) – 4:29
2. "Un'isola" (Luigi Lopez, Carla Vistarini) – 4:41
3. "Una mia semplice storia" (Stefano D'Orazio, Renato Brioschi) – 3:37
4. "Chi mi apprezza e chi disprezza" (Stefano D'Orazio, Marcello Aitiani, Mercurio) – 2:57
5. "Io voglio vivere" (Stefano D'Orazio, Renato Brioschi, Cristiano Minellono) – 5:22

Side B

1. "Senza l'amore" (Luigi Lopez, Carla Vistarini) – 4:26
2. "Alberi" (Luigi Lopez) – 4:01
3. "Cose" (Luigi Lopez, Carla Vistarini) – 3:42
4. "...E respiro" (Riccardo Fogli, Danilo Vaona) – 4:21
5. "Mondo a matita" (Luigi Lopez, Carla Vistarini) – 5:45

== Personnel ==
- Alice Visconti – lead vocals, piano
- Danilo Vaona – piano, Polymoog, Minimoog, Hammond organ, Eminent, mellotron, harpsichord, bells, Hohner, Celeste, Sistro, Fender piano
- Mino Fabiano – bass guitar
- Gianni D'Aquila – drums, timpani, percussion instruments
- Massimo Luca – electric and acoustic guitars
- Enzo Giuffrè – electric and acoustic guitars
- Luigi Lopez – electric and acoustic guitars
- F. Mancini – harmonica
- Marlaena Kessick – flute, Ottavino

== Production ==
- Giancarlo Lucariello – record producer
- Danilo Vaona – musical arranger, orchestral conductor
- Enzo Maffione – sound engineer
- Recorded at Double Recording Studios, Milan
- Luciano Tallarini – graphic design
- Mauro Balletti – photography

== Sources and external links ==
- Allmusic entry
- Cosa resta... Un fiore at Discogs (list of releases)
