= La mia poca grande età =

Studio album by Alice
- Released: 1975
- Recorded: 1975
- Genre: Pop, vocal
- Length: 42:49
- Label: CBS (69153)
- Producer: Giancarlo Lucariello

Alice chronology
La mia poca grande età (1975)	Cosa resta... Un fiore (1978)

La mia poca grande età is the debut album by Italian singer-songwriter Alice, released under the stage name "Alice Visconti" in 1975 on CBS Records.

The album was re-released on CD in Japan in 2006 in Warner Music's European Rock Collection series.

== Track listing ==
Side A

1. "Diciott'anni" (Stefano D'Orazio, Massimo Guantini) – 3:45
2. "Mi chiamo Alice" (Stefano D'Orazio, Renato Brioschi) – 4:28
3. "La mia estate" (Stefano D'Orazio, Salvatore Fabrizio) – 4:03
4. "Domani vado via" (Stefano D'Orazio, Salvatore Fabrizio) – 5:03
5. "Pensieri nel sole" (Stefano D'Orazio, Renato Brioschi) – 5:02
6. "È notte da un po'" (Stefano D'Orazio, Roberto Soffici) – 1:57

Side B

1. "Libera" (Stefano D'Orazio, Renato Brioschi) – 2:02
2. "Una casa solo mia" (Stefano D'Orazio, Roberto Soffici) – 4:02
3. "Sempre tu, sempre di più" (Stefano D'Orazio, Massimo Guantini) – 3:59
4. "Una giornata con mio padre" (Stefano D'Orazio, Dodi Battaglia) – 3:26
5. "Io voglio vivere" (Stefano D'Orazio, Renato Brioschi, Cristiano Minellono) – 5:02

== Personnel ==
- Alice Visconti – lead vocals
- Danilo Vaona – piano, backing vocals, Polymoog, Minimoog, Hammond organ, Eminent, mellotron, harpsichord, tubular bells
- Cosimo Fabiano – bass guitar
- Gianni D'Aquila – drums, timpani, percussion instruments
- Dody Battaglia – electric and acoustic guitar
- Enzo Giuffrè – electric and acoustic guitar
- Paola Orlandi, Lalla Francia, Mirella Bossi, Ornella Vanoni, Ezio Maria Picciotta – background vocals

== Production ==
- Giancarlo Lucariello – record producer
- Danilo Vaona – musical arranger, orchestral conductor
- Gualtiero Berlinghini – sound engineer
- Franco Santamaria – sound engineer
- Enzo De Rosa – sound engineer
- Recorded at Milano Recording Studios
- Luciano Tallarini – graphic design
- Mauro Balletti – photography
