= L'arca di Noè =

Studio album by Franco Battiato
- Released: 3 December 1982
- Recorded: 1982
- Genres: Pop rock, synthpop, progressive rock
- Length: 27:56
- Label: EMI Italiana
- Producer: Angelo Carrara

Franco Battiato chronology
La voce del padrone (1981)	L'arca di Noè (1982)	Orizzonti perduti (1983)

Singles from L'arca di Noè
- 1. "Voglio vederti danzare" Released: 1982

L'arca di Noè (Italian pronunciation: [ˈlarka di noˈɛ], transl. Noah's Ark) is an album by the Italian singer-songwriter Franco Battiato. It was released in 1982 by EMI Italiana.

The album sold about 550,000 copies during the first weeks of 1983.

== Reception ==
An article in the Italian newspaper La Stampa accused Battiato of including in the LP the "culture of the new right", referring in particular to the album's first song, "Radio Varsavia".

== Track listing ==
1. "Radio Varsavia"
2. "Clamori"
3. "L'esodo"
4. "Scalo a Grado"
5. "La torre"
6. "New Frontiers"
7. "Voglio vederti danzare"

== Charts ==
=== Weekly charts ===
Weekly chart performance for L'arca di Noè
Chart (1983)	Peak position
Italian Albums (Hit Parade)	1

=== Year-end charts ===
Year-end chart performance for L'arca di Noè
Chart (1983)	Position
Italian Albums (Hit Parade)	2

== See also ==
- Franco Battiato
- Noah's Ark
