= Il sole nella pioggia =

Studio album by Alice
- Released: 1989
- Recorded: 1989
- Genres: Pop, rock, alternative rock
- Length: 42:48
- Label: EMI
- Producer: Francesco Messina

Alice chronology
Mélodie passagère (1988)	Il sole nella pioggia (1989)	Mezzogiorno sulle Alpi (1992)

Il sole nella pioggia is the eleventh studio album by Italian singer-songwriter Alice, released in 1989 on EMI Music.

== Synopsis ==
The album, whose title translates as The Sun in the Rain, includes the single releases "Visioni" and "Il sole nella pioggia" as well as popular tracks like "Tempo senza tempo", "Le ragazze di Osaka" and the Friulian "Anìn a Grîs". Il sole nella pioggia features contributions from a number of international musicians who had previously collaborated with contemporary British artists in the alternative rock genre like Peter Hammill, Kate Bush and David Sylvian: drummer Steve Jansen and keyboardist Richard Barbieri – both former members of the band Japan, trumpeter Jon Hassell, guitarist Dave Gregory, guitarist and keyboardist Ian Maidman, Turkish flutist Kudsi Erguner as well as Italian jazz trumpeter Paolo Fresu.

"Le ragazze di Osaka" ("The Girls From Osaka") was originally recorded by the composer Eugenio Finardi and included on his 1983 album Dal blu, Finardi had previously written the track "Laura degli specchi" ("Laura of the Mirrors") for Alice, included on her 1982 album Azimut. The medieval French folk song and nursery rhyme "Orléans" (also known as "Le Carillon de Vendôme" or "Les Cloches De Vendôme") sung a cappella was originally arranged by David Crosby of Crosby, Stills, Nash & Young and included on his 1971 debut album If I Could Only Remember My Name. The acoustic "Anìn a Grîs", which translates as "Let's go hunt for crickets" in English, is based on a poem in the Friulian language by poet Maria Grazia Di Gleria, set to music by keyboardist Marco Liverani. Il sole nella pioggia closes with the English language track "Now and Forever", a duet with Peter Hammill of British progressive rock band Van der Graaf Generator.

Five of the tracks were written by Italian composer and singer Juri Camisasca, who also wrote "Nomadi" on the 1986 album Park Hotel.

The track "Cieli del nord" was a re-recording of "Le scogliere di Dover", first released on the Japanese compilation Kusamakura in 1988.

== Track listing ==
Side A

1. "Il sole nella pioggia" (Juri Camisasca) – 5:08
2. "Cieli del nord" (Alice, Marco Liverani) – 4:51
3. "Visioni" (Juri Camisasca) – 4:38
4. "Tempo senza tempo" (Juri Camisasca) – 4:05
5. "Le ragazze di Osaka" (Francesco Messina, Eugenio Finardi, Luca Madonia) – 4:09

Side B

1. "Orléans" (Traditional, arranged by David Crosby) – 1:39
2. "Anìn a Grîs" (Maria Grazia Di Gleria, Marco Liverani) – 3:36
3. "L'era del mito" (Juri Camisasca) – 4:33
4. "Le baccanti" (Juri Camisasca) – 5:04
5. "Now and Forever" (duet with Peter Hammill) (Peter Hammill) – 5:05

== Personnel ==
- Alice – vocals, percussion track B3
- Steve Jansen – drums tracks A1, A2, A3, A4, A5, percussion tracks A1, A5, B4, keyboards track A1, cymbals track B5
- Ian Maidman – bass guitar track A1, A4, A5, B4, B5 Prophet bass track A2, guitar solo track A4, keyboards & string arrangements track A5
- Richard Barbieri – keyboards & keyboard programming tracks A1, A2, A3, "Prophet V Guitar" track A3, keyboards tracks A4, A5, B2, B4, "Prophet V Guitar" solo track B3
- Jon Hassell – trumpet tracks A1, B4, keyboard activated sound (sampled trumpet) track A3
- Dave Gregory – guitars tracks A1, A3, bass track B2, 12-string and E-Bow solo guitar track B3
- Francesco Messina – keyboards & percussion programming track A1, keyboards tracks A3, A4, B1, keyboards & percussion track B3
- Marco Guarnerio – computer programming track A1, keyboards programming & guitars track A2, keyboards & computer programming track A3, acoustic guitar track B2, keyboards track B3
- Paolo Fresu – trumpets track A2
- Stefano Cerri – bass tracks A3, B2
- Marco Liverani – keyboards track A3
- Pino Pischerola – Sinewave sample tracks B1, B4, EMU III programming track B3
- Roberto Baldi – Prophet bass & keyboards track B3
- Nino Lali Piccoli – tablas solo track B3
- Franz Backmann – flügelhorn track B4
- Peter Hammill – voice, keyboards & arrangements track B5
- Kudsi Erguner – ney flute track B5

== Production ==
- Francesco Messina – record producer
- Tim Kramer – sound engineer at Logic Studio, Milan, mix at Logic Studio (Tracks A1, A2, A3)
- Pino "Pinaxa" Pischetola – sound engineer at Logic Studio, mix at Logic Studio (Tracks B1 – B5), Audio File Digital Editing
- Antonio Baglio – sound engineer at Logic Studio, mix at Logic Studio (Track A5, re-edit)
- Alessandro Franchin – sound engineer at Condulmer Studio
- Marco Guarnerio – sound engineer at Condulmer Studio
- Steve Jansen – mix at Condulmer Studio (Tracks A4 & A5)
- Richard Barbieri – mix at Condulmer Studio (Tracks A4 & A5)
- Polystudio – artwork, design
- Sheila Rock – photography
- Alessandro Paderni – photography

== Sources and external links ==
- discogs.com entry
- rateyourmusic.com entry
- allmusic.com entry
- Il sole nella pioggia at Discogs (list of releases)
