= Per Elisa =

Single by Alice

from the album Alice
- B-side: "Non devi avere paura"
- Released: January 16, 1981
- Genre: New wave; synthpop
- Length: 3:40
- Label: EMI
- Songwriters: Alice; Franco Battiato; Giusto Pio
- Lyricist: Alice

Alice singles chronology
"Il vento caldo dell'estate" (1980)	"Per Elisa" (1981)	"Una notte speciale" (1981)

Audio
- "Per Elisa" on YouTube

"Per Elisa" (transl. "For Elisa") is a 1981 single by Alice. The song was the breakthrough in the singer's career, winning the 31st edition of the Sanremo Music Festival, and being an international commercial success.

== Background ==
The song marked a second collaboration between Battiato and Alice, following the 1980 moderately successful single "Il vento caldo dell'estate". The title Per Elisa is a reference to Ludwig van Beethoven's composition "Für Elise", whose musical theme is reprised in the intro of the song.

The lyrics on surface tell the story of a love triangle from the point of view of a betrayed woman, but according to many critics actually refer to drug addiction, with the Elisa of the title being a code name for heroin. In this interpretation, rejected by both Alice and Battiato, the song was included in the soundtrack of the Claudio Caligari's 1983 drug-themed film Toxic Love.

The structure of the song has been described as "unusual because it lacks a refrain, but equally catchy thanks to several melodic hooks and a smooth mainstream sound".

== Track listing ==
- 7" single - 3C 006-18529
1. "Per Elisa" (Alice, Franco Battiato, Giusto Pio)
2. "Non devi avere paura" (Alice)

== Charts ==
Chart	Peak position
Italy (Musica e dischi)	1
Germany	17
Austria	4
Switzerland	5
