= Charade (Alice album) =

Studio album by Alice
- Released: 1995, 1996
- Recorded: 1995
- Genres: Vocal, alternative, electronica, ambient
- Length: 44:02
- Label: WEA/Warner Music
- Producer: Francesco Messina

Alice chronology
Viaggiatrice solitaria (1995)	Charade (1995)	Exit (1998)

Charade is the thirteenth studio album by Italian singer-songwriter Alice, released in late 1995 on WEA/Warner Music.

After a three-year-long artistic and legal dispute with her label EMI Music Alice signed with WEA in 1995 and then released her first studio album since 1992's Mezzogiorno sulle Alpi, the both musically and lyrically introspective and contemplative Charade featuring contributions from musicians such as King Crimson's Trey Gunn, several tracks with British improvisational solo violinist Stuart Gordon and acoustic tracks with the American/Belgian/Japanese California Guitar Trio. Charade further developed the use of minimalist ambient/avant-garde backgrounds, fractured guitars and woodwind, muted trumpets and accordion set against programmed TR-808 rhythms, influenced by dance music genres like electronica and contemporary R&B, fused with world music samples and looped vocals.

Lead single "Dammi la mano amore" was also included as an ambient dub mix on the album, entitled Devogue version, and the second edition of Charade added an R&B influenced remix as a bonus track. "In piedi su uno specchio" was later to reappear as part of a collaborative crossover/ambient/fusion project called Devogue, a forty-five-minute sound collage which featured Alice, producer Francesco Messina, Porcupine Tree's Gavin Harrison and composer and singer Juri Camisasca among others, released on the independent label CNI in 1997. Alice sings lead vocals on five of the album's thirteen titles; "Midnight Bells", "In piedi su uno specchio", "Le condizioni del tempo (a.m.)", "Palmenhaus" and "Il cielo sopra il cielo", the latter which would appear on the album Exit the following year.

Both "Dammi la mano amore" and the second single "Non ero mai sola" were later to be included in the 2000 career retrospective Personal Jukebox.

== Track listing ==
1. "L'apparenza" (Mino Di Martino, Alice, Francesco Messina) – 4:44
2. "Dammi la mano amore" (Alice) – 3:55
3. "In piedi su uno specchio" (Francesco Messina, Alice) 4:17
4. "Il silenzio delle abitudini" (Antonio Sparapano, Aldo Gemma) – 3:33
5. "Charade" (Mino Di Martino) – 3:40
6. "Gli ultimi fuochi" (Alice) – 3:19
7. "Non ero mai sola" (Francesco Messina, Alice) – 4:24
8. "Nel resto del tempo" (Francesco Messina, Alice) – 3:51
9. "Il Nido del gatto" (Francesco Messina, Alice) – 3:19
10. "Sotto lo stesso cielo" (Alice, Mino Di Martino, Francesco Messina) – 4:10
11. "Dammi la mano amore" (Devogue version) (Alice) – 2:25
12. "La fronte mormora" (Francesco Messina) – 2:25
13. "Dammi la mano amore" (The Remix) (Alice)
  - Bonus track on 1996 edition

== Personnel ==
- Alice – lead vocals, electric piano, keyboards
- Francesco Messina – keyboards, synthesizers and sound programming
- Pino Pinaxa Pischetola – rhythms construction, processing
- Trey Gunn – Warr guitar tracks 1, 2, 5, 7, 8 & 10
- Marco Guarnerio – electric guitars tracks 1, 4, 5, 7–10
- California Guitar Trio (Bert Lams, Paul Richards, Hideyo Moriya) – acoustic guitars tracks 6 & 12
- Paul Richards – Ebow guitar tracks 3 & 6
- Stuart Gordon – violins, viola tracks 2, 5, 7, 8 & 12
- Paolo Fresu – trumpet tracks 3, 7 & 12
- Bruno Romani – flute tracks 1, 9 & 10, saxophone tracks 1 & 9
- Roberto Gemma – accordion track 4, keyboards tracks 4 & 10
- Mauro Spina – guitars tracks 4, 5, 9 & 10
- Mino Di Martino – poem reading track 3, vocals track 11

== Production ==
- Francesco Messina – record producer, musical arranger
- Pino Pinaxa Pischetola – sound engineering and mix at Stonehenge Studio, Milan February, March & April 1995
- Mastered at Profile Studio, Milan by Antonio Baglio, May 1995
- Polystudio – design
- Ekostudio – artwork
- Sheila Rock – photography
- Massimo Gardone – photography
- Azimut – photography
