= Capo Nord (album) =

Studio album by Alice
- Released: 1980
- Recorded: 1980
- Genre: New wave, avant-pop, synthpop
- Length: 32:07
- Label: EMI
- Producer: Angelo Carrara

Alice chronology
Cosa resta... Un fiore (1978)	Capo Nord (1980)	Alice (Per Elisa) (1981)

Capo Nord is the third studio album by Italian singer-songwriter Alice, released in 1980 on EMI Music.

The album includes Alice's Italian breakthrough single "Il vento caldo dell'estate", her first collaboration with composer and singer Franco Battiato.

After Alice won the Sanremo Music Festival in 1981 with "Per Elisa", Capo Nord was re-released in certain territories and then added the track as A5.

Alternate versions of both "Rumba Rock" (then retitled "Hispavox") and "Il vento caldo dell'estate" were included on the 1987 album Elisir. "Il vento caldo dell'estate" was again re-recorded in 2000 and included in the career retrospective Personal Jukebox.

== Track listing ==
Side A

1. "Il vento caldo dell'estate (Franco Battiato, Giusto Pio, Alice) – 3:34
2. "Bazar (Alice, Franco Battiato, Giusto Pio) – 3:03
3. "Sarà" (Alice, Franco Battiato, Giusto Pio) – 3:01
4. "Lenzuoli bianchi" (Alice, Franco Battiato, Giusto Pio) – 3:34
5. "Una sera di novembre" (Alice, Franco Battiato, Giusto Pio) – 3:03

Side B

1. "Sera (Alice) – 3:48
2. "Bael" (Alice, Franco Battiato, Giusto Pio) – 3:44
3. "Rumba Rock" (also known as "Hispavox"; Alice, Franco Battiato, Giusto Pio) – 4:14
4. "Guerriglia urbana" (Alice, Giusto Pio, Franco Battiato) – 4:06

== Personnel ==
- Alice – lead vocals, synthesizer tracks A1, A3, A5
- Mauro Spina – drums
- Stefano Cerri – bass guitar
- Cosimo Fabiano – bass guitar track B4
- Alberto Radius – guitar, sitar
- Giusto Pio – violin
- Filippo Destieri – keyboard instruments
- Mark Harris – piano
- Roberto Colombo – keyboards tracks A3, A4
- Lino "Capra" Vaccina – timpani

== Production ==
- Angelo Carrara – record producer
- Franco Battiato – musical arranger
- Giusto Pio – musical arranger
- Enzo "Titti" Denna – sound engineer
- Recorded and mixed at Capolago Sound Studios, Milan
- Luciano Tallarini – graphic design
- Mauro Balletti – photography
