= Elisir (Alice album) =

Studio album by Alice
- Released: 1987
- Recorded: 1987
- Genre: Pop, rock
- Length: 37:13
- Label: EMI
- Producer: Francesco Messina

Alice chronology
Park Hotel (1986)	Elisir (1987)	Kusamakura (1988)

Elisir is the ninth studio album by Italian singer-songwriter Alice, released in late 1987 on EMI Music.

The album was recorded after the 1986/1987 European Park Hotel concert tour and includes new interpretations of six songs from the singer's earlier repertoire as performed on the tour, as well as the previously unreleased "Nuvole" ("Clouds") and a cover version of John Lennon and Paul McCartney's "The Fool on the Hill", released as the album's lead single. The Elisir was a commercial success in both Continental Europe and Scandinavia and was later awarded the prize Goldene Europa for sales on the West German market.

The track "Hispavox" was first released as "Rumba Rock" on the 1980 album Capo Nord.

Elisir was released with a revised track list under the title Kusamakura in Japan in 1988, then also including tracks from 1986's Park Hotel as well as the previously unreleased recording "Le scogliere di Dover".

Both "Il vento caldo dell'estate" and "I treni di Tozeur" were again re-recorded and included in the 2000 career retrospective Personal Jukebox.

== Track listing ==
Side A

1. "Nuvole" (Alice, Tuni, Francesco Messina) – 5:13
  - Previously unreleased recording.
2. "Il vento caldo dell'estate" (1987 version) (Alice, Franco Battiato, Giusto Pio) – 4:26
  - Original version appears on 1980 album Capo Nord.
3. "Notte a Roma" (1987 version) (Alice) – 4:14
  - Original version appears on 1983 album Falsi allarmi.
4. "Hispavox" (Alice, Franco Battiato, Giusto Pio) – 5:03
  - Original version entitled "Rumba Rock" appears on 1980 album Capo Nord.

Side B

1. "I treni di Tozeur" (1987 solo version) (Franco Battiato, Saro Cosentino, Giusto Pio) – 4:23
  - Original duet version with Franco Battiato released as single in 1984.
2. "The Fool on the Hill" (John Lennon, Paul McCartney) – 3:32
  - Previously unreleased recording
3. "Una notte speciale" (1987 version) (Alice, Franco Battiato, Giusto Pio) – 4:40
  - Original version appears on 1981 album Alice, also known as Per Elisa.
4. "La mano" (1987 version) (Alice) – 5:42
  - Original version appears on 1982 album Azimut.

== Personnel ==
- Alice – lead vocals, keyboard instruments
- Curt Cress – drums, percussion instruments
- Filippo Destrieri – keyboards, computer and drum machine
- Michele Fedrigotti – keyboards, Korg digital piano, synthesizer bass
- Marco Guarnerio – acoustic and electric guitars
- Francesco Messina – keyboard programming
- Marco Liverani – keyboards

== Production ==
- Francesco Messina – record producer, musical arranger
- Marco Liverani – musical arranger
- Marco Guarniero – collaborator musical arrangements
- Michele Fedrigotti – musical supervisor
- Benedict Tobias Fenner – sound engineer
- Mixed by Benedict Tobias Fenner except "Notte a Roma" mixed by Marco Guarnerio
- Recorded and mixed at Logic Studio Milan in September and October 1987
- CDG Milano – digital editing
- Mastered at Abbey Road Studios, London
- Polystudio & EMI Creative Service – cover design
- Gik Piccardi – cover photography
- Gioi Ardessi – make-up
- Alessandro Paderni – tour photography

== Chart performance ==
Chart (1988)	Peak position
German Albums (Offizielle Top 100)	54
Swedish Albums (Sverigetopplistan)	25
