= Alice (Per Elisa) =

Studio album by Alice
- Released: 1981
- Recorded: 1981
- Genre: New wave, pop, synthpop, avant-pop
- Length: 33:01
- Label: EMI
- Producer: Angelo Carrara

Alice chronology
Capo Nord (1980)	Alice (Per Elisa) (1981)	Azimut (1982)

Alternative cover
- Per Elisa

Alice (Per Elisa) is the fourth studio album by Italian singer-songwriter Alice, released in 1981 on EMI Music.

The album includes Alice's winning entry in the 1981 Sanremo Music Festival, "Per Elisa", and the Alice album was released under that title in certain territories, then also with alternative cover art. The track "Una notte speciale" was released as the follow-up single to "Per Elisa".

An alternate version of "Una notte speciale" appears on the 1987 album Elisir. A re-recorded version of "Per Elisa" was included in the 2000 career retrospective Personal Jukebox.

== Track listing ==
Side A

1. "Per Elisa" (Franco Battiato, Giusto Pio, Alice) – 3:40
2. "A Te..." (Alice) – 4:56
3. "Non ti confondere amico" (Alice) – 4:25
4. "Una notte speciale" (Alice, Franco Battiato, Giusto Pio) – 4:14

Side B

1. "Non devi aver paura" (Alice) – 3:42
2. "Senza cornice" (Alice) – 5:30
3. "Momenti d'ozio" (Alice, Franco Battiato, Giusto Pio) – 3:18
4. "Tramonto urbano" (Alice) – 3:16

== Personnel ==
- Alice – lead vocals
- Walter Calloni – drums
- Flaviano Cuffari – drums (tracks A1, B1, B3)
- Paolo Donnarumma – bass guitar
- Alberto Radius – guitar
- Filippo Destrieri – keyboards, Fender Rhodes, synth
- Salvatore Giumeno – clarinet
- Franco Tangari – oboe
- Hugo Heredia – saxophone
- Paola Orlandi – backing vocals track A4

== Production ==
- Angelo Carrara – record producer
- Franco Battiato – musical arranger
- Giusto Pio – musical arranger
- Enzo "Titti" Denna – sound engineer
- Recorded and mixed at Radius Studio
- Luciano Tallarini – graphic design
- Fulvio Ventura – photography
- Francesco Messina – art direction

== Charts ==
=== Weekly charts ===
Chart (1981–82)	Peak position
German Albums (Offizielle Top 100)	16
Swedish Albums (Sverigetopplistan)	30

=== Year-end charts ===
Chart (1982)	Position
German Albums (Offizielle Top 100)	38
