= Mezzogiorno sulle Alpi =

Studio album by Alice
- Released: November 20, 1992
- Recorded: May–December 1991
- Genres: Alternative rock, experimental rock
- Length: 44:49
- Label: EMI
- Producer: Francesco Messina

Alice chronology
Il sole nella pioggia (1989)	Mezzogiorno sulle Alpi (1992)	Viaggiatrice solitaria (1995)

Mezzogiorno sulle Alpi is the twelfth studio album by Italian singer-songwriter Alice, released in 1992 on EMI Music.

Three years after the commercial success of Il sole nella pioggia Alice returned to the music scene with her most mature and complex work to date, exploring genres like experimental and avant-garde rock and including influences from both contemporary jazz and European and Asian folk music. Mezzogiorno Sulle Alpi, which translates as "Noon in the Alps", also featured further collaborations with British musicians like keyboardist Richard Barbieri (former member of Japan and Rain Tree Crow, Barbieri also co-wrote two of the tracks), drummer Gavin Harrison, bassist Danny Thompson, guitarist Dave Gregory, guitarist and keyboardist Jakko Jakszyk, bassist Martin Elliott as well as influential Italian jazz trumpeter Paolo Fresu.

The album's opening track and lead single, "In viaggio sul tuo viso", includes an excerpt from the Hungarian folk melody "Istenem Istenem". The English language track "Blue Melody" is a cover of a song by American singer-songwriter Tim Buckley, originally included on his 1969 album Blue Afternoon. The lyrics to the track "La Recessione" is a poem by controversial Italian cinematographer, intellectual and writer Pier Paolo Pasolini, taken from one of his early works, La meglio gioventù (1954), set to music by Alice's longtime co-writer Mino Di Martino. The song "Tim" was dedicated to the late Tim Kramer, a sound engineer with whom Alice had collaborated on the albums Mélodie passagère and Il Sole Nella Pioggia.

Mezzogiorno sulle Alpi came to be Alice's final studio album for EMI Music. Despite its moderate commercial success the Italian subsidiary of the EMI label chose not to record the artist's next project, Art et Décoration with the Arturo Toscanini Symphony Orchestra, and instead released a best of compilation of 1980s hits entitled Il vento caldo dell'estate, including an unapproved disco remix of the 1982 duet "Chan-son Egocentrique" with Franco Battiato, which omitted all lines sung by the composer himself. This subsequently resulted in both artists leaving the EMI label after a fifteen-year collaboration.

Alice recorded new interpretations of both "Madre notte" and the Hungarian traditional "Istenem Istenem" for her 1999 album God Is My DJ.

== Track listing ==
1. "In viaggio sul tuo viso" (Francesco Messina, Alice) – 4:06
  - Includes "Istenem, Istenem" (Traditional, arranged by Francesco Messina, Alice)
2. "Passano gli anni" (Francesco Messina, Mino Di Martino) – 3:50
3. "Blue Melody" (Tim Buckley) – 5:54
4. "Neve d'aprile" (Francesco Messina, Mino Di Martino, Alice) – 4:02
5. "Rain Town" (Francesco Messina, Richard Barbieri, Alice) – 4:00
6. "Il colore della lontananza" (Francesco Messina, Alice) – 4:21
7. "Tim" (Dedicated to Tim Kramer) (Francesco Messina, Alice) – 1:06
8. "Lungo ritorno a casa" (Francesco Messina, Alice, https://it.wikipedia.org/wiki/Saro_CosentinoSaro Cosentino) – 4:43
9. "La recessione" (Pier Paolo Pasolini, Mino Di Martino) – 3:53
10. "Madre notte" (Francesco Messina, Paolo Fresu, Francesco Messina) – 3:20
11. "Luce della sera" (Francesco Messina, Alice, Richard Barbieri) – 5:32

== Personnel ==
- Alice – vocals, keyboards tracks 6, 7 & 9
- Pino Pischetola – computer, drum programming tracks 1, 4, 6 & 8
- Marco Guarniero – computer, guitars & keyboards track 1, additional keyboards track 2, electric guitars & additional keyboards track 6, bass guitar, classic & electric guitars track 8
- Francesco Messina – keyboards & bass track 1, keyboards track 2, keyboards & organ track 3, keyboards track 4, piano track 5, keyboards & piano tracks 6 & 7, keyboards tracks 8 & 9, keyboards, piano & vibe-strings track 10
- Gavin Harrison – drums tracks 1–4, percussion tracks 5, 8 & 9, drums & percussion track 11
- Paolo Fresu – trumpet tracks 1, 8, 10 & 11
- Danny Thompson – double bass tracks 2, 3, 5, 9 & 11
- Dave Gregory – electric guitars tracks 2 & 5, acoustic guitar track 8, acoustic & electric guitars track 9
- Jakko Jakszyk – guitars track 2, acoustic guitars & keyboards track 3, acoustic guitar track 5
- Bruno Romani – flutes track 2, saxophone tracks 4 & 6
- Stefano Battaglia – piano tracks 3, 4 & 11
- Martin Elliott – bass tracks 4 & 6
- Richard Barbieri – keyboards tracks 5 & 11
- Michele Fedrigotti – sampled strings track 8

== Production ==
- Francesco Messina – record producer
- Recorded at Logic Studio Milan and Polystudio by Pino Pischetola & Marco Guarnerio, May–December 1991
- Mixed at Logic Studio by Pino Pischetola, January 1992
- Editing: Logic Audio File Studio
- Polystudio – artwork, design
- Massimo Gradone – photography
- Comp Service, Udine – graphic design
