= Azimut (Alice album) =

Studio album by Alice
- Released: 1982
- Recorded: 1982
- Genre: Pop, rock
- Length: 36:46
- Label: EMI
- Producer: Angelo Carrara

Alice chronology
Alice (1981)	Azimut (1982)	Falsi allarmi (1983)

Azimut is the fifth studio album by Italian singer-songwriter Alice, released in 1982 on EMI Music.

Singles released from the album include "Messaggio" (1982), "A cosa pensano" (1982) and "Chan-son Egocentrique" (1983), the latter a duet with Franco Battiato. The track "Messaggio" was co-written by Battiato under one of his pseudonyms, "Albert Kui". The closing track "Laura degli specchi" ("Laura of the Mirrors") is a folk-pop song written by singer-songwriter Eugenio Finardi, whose "Le ragazze di Osaka" Alice would later cover on her 1989 album Il sole nella pioggia.

An alternate version of the track "La mano" appears on the 1987 album Elisir. Re-recorded versions of both "A cosa pensano" and "Chan-son Egocentrique" were included in the 2000 career retrospective Personal Jukebox.

== Track listing ==
Side A

1. "Azimut" (Alice) – 3:44
2. "A cosa pensano" (Francesco Messina, Alice) – 3:42
3. "Animali d'America" (Alice) – 4:09
4. "Deciditi" (Alice) – 3:39
5. "Messaggio" (Alice, Albert Kui (pseudonym for Franco Battiato), Giusto Pio) – 3:46

Side B

1. "Principessa" (Alice) – 4:28
2. "La mano" (Alice) – 5:35
3. "Chan-son Egocentrique" (duet with Franco Battiato) (Franco Battiato, Francesco Messina, Tommaso Tramonti) – 3:52
4. "Laura degli specchi" (Eugenio Finardi) – 3:51

== Personnel ==
- Alice – lead vocals, piano & synthesizer tracks A1, A3 & B2
- Matteo Fasolino – keyboards, piano, synthesizer
- Alfredo Golino – drums, percussion
- Franco Testa – bass guitar
- Paolo Donnarumma – bass guitar track A5
- Claudio Bizzarri – guitar
- Alberto Radius – guitar track A5
- Claudio Pascoli – saxophone tracks A3 & B3
- Giorgio Baiocco – saxophone track A5
- Filippo Destrieri – keyboards tracks A5 & B4

== Production ==
- Angelo Carrara – record producer
- Alice – musical arranger, sound engineer
- Matteo Fasolino – musical arranger, sound engineer
- Alfredo Golino – musical arranger, rhythm section
- Albert Kui (Franco Battiato) – musical arranger track A5
- Giusto Pio – musical arranger track A5
- Eugenio Finardi – musical arranger tracks B2, B4
- Enzo "Titti" Denna – sound engineer
- Recorded at Stone Castle Studios except tracks A5 & B4 at Radius Studio
- Mulino – sound mixing

== Charts ==
Chart	Peak position
Italy (Hit Parade)	13
