= Park Hotel (album) =

Studio album by Alice
- Released: 1986
- Recorded: 1986
- Genre: Pop, rock
- Length: 38:13
- Language: Italian
- Label: EMI
- Producer: Francesco Messina

Alice chronology
Alice (1986)	Park Hotel (1986)	Elisir (1987)

Park Hotel is the eighth studio album by Italian singer-songwriter Alice, released in late 1986 on EMI Music.

The album was recorded with a four-piece band consisting of Italian keyboardist Michele Fedrigotti plus three internationally acclaimed musicians: American bassist Tony Levin (King Crimson, Peter Gabriel, Pink Floyd, Yes, Lou Reed etc.), American drummer Jerry Marotta (Orleans, Peter Gabriel, Hall and Oates, Tony Levin Band etc.) and British guitarist Phil Manzanera (Roxy Music, Bryan Ferry, Brian Eno, Pink Floyd etc.).

Park Hotel which was Alice's first project to be produced by long-time collaborator Francesco Messina, and included the single releases "Nomadi" and "Conoscersi" as well as other popular tracks like "Il senso dei desideri", "Volo di notte", "Viali di solitudine" and "Nuvole rosse", became one of the greatest commercial successes of the singer's career, a Top 20 hit in most parts of Continental Europe as well as Scandinavia (#14 Sweden) and Japan in early 1987. The track "Nomadi" was later covered by Franco Battiato on his 1988 album Fisiognomica.

A re-recorded version of "Nomadi" was included in the 2000 career retrospective Personal Jukebox. "Viali Di Solitudine" was re-recorded for the 2014 Weekend album.

== Track listing ==
Side A

1. "Il senso dei desideri" (Alice, Mino Di Martino, Saro Cosentino) – 4:12
2. "Viali di solitudine" (Francesco Messina, Marco Liverani) – 4:04
3. "Conoscersi" (Francesco Messina, Alice, Marco Liverani) – 3:16
4. "Città chiusa" (Francesco Messina, Marco Liverani) – 4:21
5. "Nuvole rosse" (Saro Cosentino, Vincenzo Zitello) – 4:00

Side B

1. "Luci lontane" (Francesco Messina, Alice) – 5:13
2. "Nomadi" (Juri Camisasca) – 4:29
3. "Volo di notte" (Francesco Messina, Alice) – 5:07
4. "Segni nel cielo" (Francesco Messina, Alice, Marco Liverani) – 4:13

== Personnel ==
- Alice – lead vocals
- Jerry Marotta – drums, LinnDrum programming
- Tony Levin – bass guitar, stick bass
- Phil Manzanera – guitars
- Michele Fedrigotti – keyboard instruments, MIDI piano
- Pietro Pellegrini – Fairlight programming

== Production ==
- Francesco Messina – record producer, musical arranger
- Alice – musical arranger
- Michele Fedrigotti – musical supervision
- Recorded at Lark Studio, Carimate
- Allan Golberg – sound engineer
- Jim at Logic Studio, Milan – assistant sound engineer
- Benedict Tobias Fenner – assistant sound engineer
- Mauro Stokmajer – technical assistance
- Fabio Montaldi – technical assistance
- Mixed by Benedict Tobias Fenner at Logic Studio, Milan
- Polystudio – cover design
- Pia Valentinis – artwork
- Fulvio Ventura – photography
