= Bluvertigo =

Italian alternative rock group

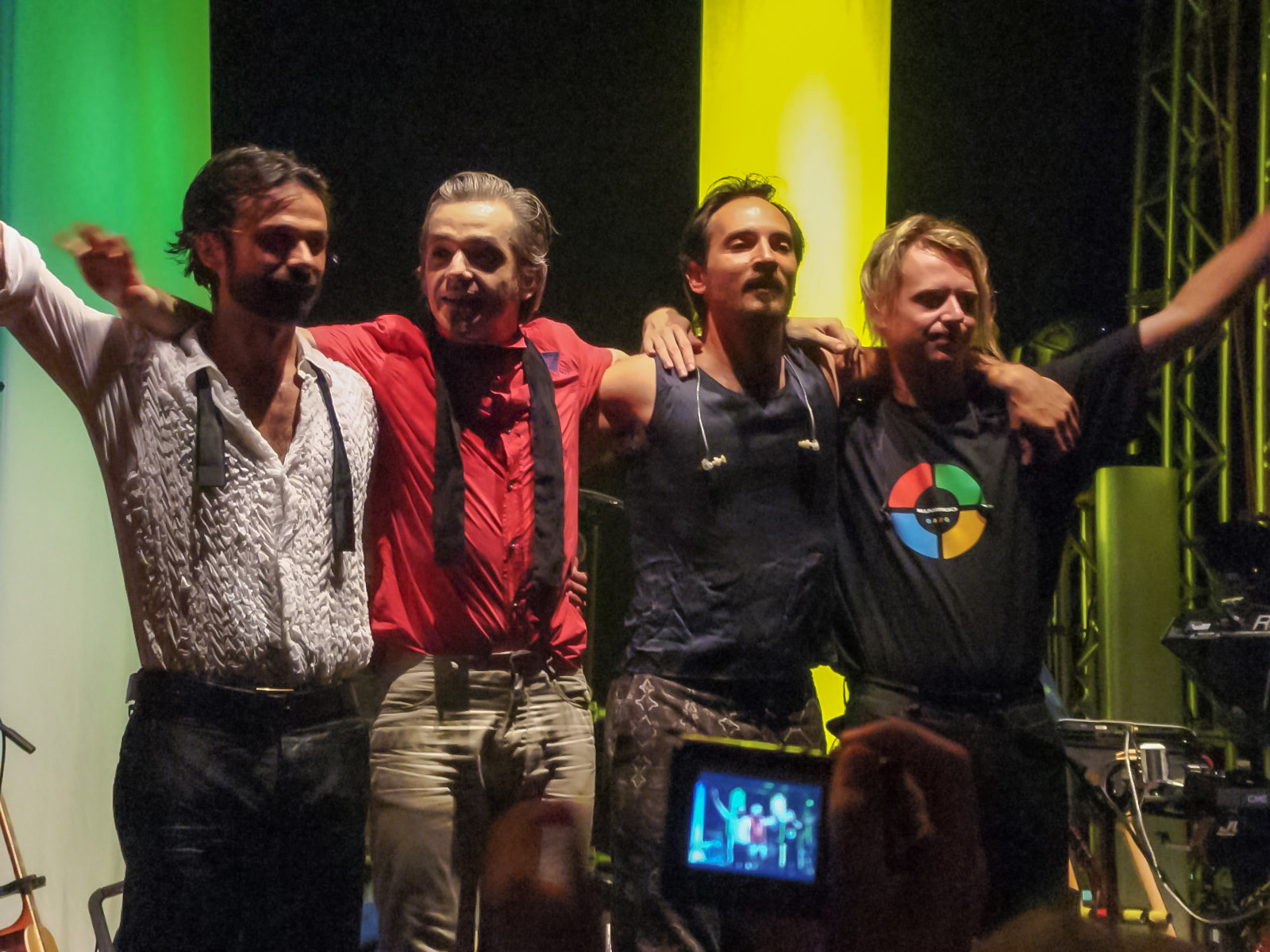
- Bluvertigo in 2008

Background information
- Origin: Italy
- Genres: Alternative rock; rock; new wave; synthpop
- Years active: 1991–2001, 2008, 2014–2017, 2021.
- Members: Morgan; Andrea Fumagalli; Sergio Carnevale; Livio Magnini
- Past members: Marco Pancaldi

Bluvertigo was an Italian alternative rock band from Milan.

== History ==
Originally formed in 1992 with the name Golden Age, the band switched to the name Bluvertigo shortly before recording their first album. The founding members are Morgan (Marco Castoldi), Andy (Andrea Fumagalli) and Marco Pancaldi. Drummer Sergio Carnevale joined the band in 1994 while Pancaldi was replaced by Livio Magnini in 1996.

Bluvertigo's first album, Acidi e basi ("Acids and Bases"), was released in 1995. It was followed by Metallo non metallo ("Metal Nonmetal") in 1997 and Zero in 1999. These first three albums were later called "la trilogia chimica" ("the chemical trilogy") because every title has a reference to chemistry and the initial letters (AB-MN-Z) are respectively the first, the central and the last ones of the alphabet. In 2001 Bluvertigo participated to the Sanremo Music Festival with "L'assenzio (The Power of Nothing)". Following the release of the greatest hits album Pop Tools, the band went on hiatus for almost a decade. In 2008 they reunited for a live performance on MTV, an event later documented in the album MTV Storytellers (2008).

In 2003 Morgan released his first solo album: Le canzoni dell'appartamento.

== Members ==
Current members

- Morgan (Marco Castoldi) – lead vocals, bass, keyboards, piano (1992–2021)
- Andy (Andrea Fumagalli) – keyboards, saxophone, backing vocals (1992–2021)
- Sergio Carnevale – drums, percussions (1996–2021)
- Livio Magnini – guitar (1996–2021)

Former members

- Marco Pancaldi – guitar (1992–1996)

== Discography ==
Studio albums

- Acidi e Basi (1995)
- Metallo Non Metallo (1997)
- Zero - ovvero la famosa nevicata dell'85 (1999)

Best-ofs

- Pop Tools (2001)

Live albums

- MTV Storytellers (2008)

== Source and external links ==
- Myspace
- Andy official website
- Morgan official website
