= Eugenio Finardi =

Italian rock singer-songwriter

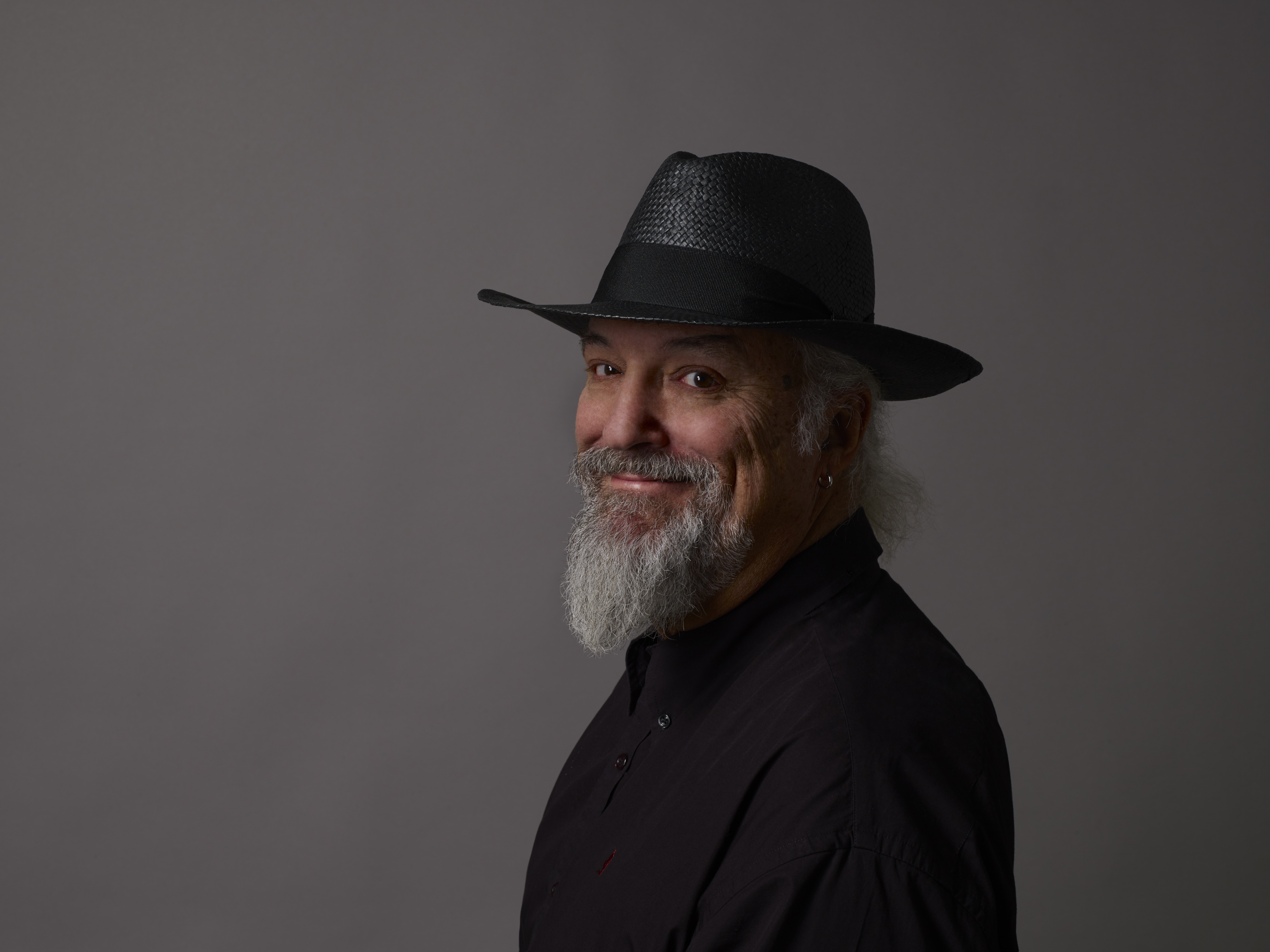
- Born: Eugenio Finardi; July 16, 1952 (age 73); Milan (Italy)
- Occupations: singer, composer, songwriter, guitarist and keyboardist
- Years active: 1972–present
- Height: 1.84 m (6 ft 0 in)
- Spouse: Patrizia Convertino
- Children: 2

Eugenio Finardi (born July 16, 1952) is an Italian rock singer, songwriter, guitarist and keyboardist.

== Life ==
Eugenio Finardi was born in Milan, Italy, on July 16, 1952, in a musical family: his father Enzo was an Italian music sound engineer and his mother Eloise an American opera singer; at age six Finardi made his first record, Palloncino Rosso Fuoco, a children song.

Finardi became part of a thriving music scene in Milan in the late 1960s. Rooted in the blues, classic rock and roll and the hippy counter-culture, he was active in the left-wing youth movement of those years. In 1969 he formed his first rock band The Tiger. Soon he started playing with Alberto Camerini, a singer and guitarist born in Brazil, who a few years later would be instrumental in introducing American and British new wave and techno-pop to Italian pop music. Together they even emulated the US film Easy Rider by travelling on motorbikes from Milan to Amsterdam. The scene Finardi became part of included among others bands like Area and Stormy Six, Claudio Rocchi and female singer-songwriter Donatella Bardi. Finardi made a living by day teaching English, in which he was fluent because of his American mother, and as a musician by night, as a singer, guitarist and piano player. After forming the band Il Pacco with Camerini, Finardi recorded a single in English in 1973, Spacey Stacey/Hard Rock Honey for Numero Uno, the first Italian independent record label started by singer-songwriter Lucio Battisti and his writing partner Mogol, who had a long string of Italian and international hits under their belts, and who had introduced in Italian Pop music different styles from the US and the UK, from the Rock music of Bob Dylan, The Beatles and The Rolling Stones, to Blues and Soul. Finardi's single went largely unnoticed.

== Early career, the 1970s ==
Thanks to his friendship with the band Area and their singer Demetrio Stratos, in 1974 Finardi signed with the label Cramps, run by Gianni Sassi. 1975 saw the release of his first album Non Gettate Alcun Oggetto Dal Finestrino. The album was a mixture of the style of Italian singer-songwriters and Rock'n'Roll. Camerini on guitar, Lucio Fabbri on violin, Walter Calloni on drums were among the musicians who played on the record, which included a Rock version of traditional Italian protest folk song Saluteremo Il Signor Padrone, and original songs by Finardi – one, Taking It Easy, in English – with social commentary about metropolitan alienation, against the compulsory national service in the Italian army, and political prisoners. The album was influenced by both progressive rock, which was extremely popular in Italy, and Hippie idealism.

Finardi became known from playing at Milan's alternative Festival in Parco Lambro in 1976, introducing a Rock sound to the Italian genre of singer-songwriters who were often politically involved, and mostly somewhat derivative of folk rock, the early protest songs of Bob Dylan, and of the American West-Coast music of artists like Neil Young. Finardi looked to the more electric and up-tempo sound of Rock&Roll and The Rolling Stones, and his sound was also often influenced by jazz rock fusion, thanks to Area members Patrizio Fariselli and Ares Tavolazzi, and bass-player Hugh Bullen.

== Years of lead ==
Finardi's sound and style became a success in 1976, with his second album Sugo, and his third Diesel in 1977. The first included the counter-cultural youth anthem Musica Ribelle, and the hymn to pirate radio stations La Radio; the second was the love ballad Non e' Nel Cuore, which were all released as singles. Finardi, who had started performing live often on his own with an acoustic guitar and sitting down, was now touring with a four or five-piece Rock band. His introduction of Rock'n'Roll in the genre of socially and politically aware Italian singer-songwriters was what made Finardi stand out and endeared him to the counter-cultural youth of late 1970s Italy, which in 1976–78 was in the midst of political upheaval and almost civil war, with the occupations of factories, universities and high-schools, demonstrations which ended in pitched battles with the police – often with fatal casualties – and the rise of political movements like Autonomia, the Indiani Metropolitani and terrorist groups like the Red Brigades (Brigate Rosse).

This eventful period of Italian contemporary history is known as the Anni di piombo (Years Of Lead) and also as the era of the Movimento '77, the youth movement for which 1977 was a pivotal year, somewhat an Italian equivalent of the punk rock upheaval in the US and Great Britain. The dramatic and eventful climate of the period was the result of the so-called strategy of tension (strategia della tensione): the confrontation between youth counter-culture and left-wing activists against an Italian government perceived as reactionary, repressive, corrupt, unstable, manoeuvred by the US, which disseminated disinformation and engaged in false-flag terror attacks blamed on the left to establish a more authoritarian regime.

Finardi was a notable counter-cultural and musical protagonist of these years, with songs like "La C.I.A." about the American Secret Services' involvement in Italian politics, "Soldi" about consumerism, "Giai Phong" about the Vietnam War, "Scuola" about the education system, "Tutto Subito" about the confrontational street demos of Autonomia, and "Scimmia" which chronicled Finardi's past heroin addiction and subsequent self-detoxification through 'cold turkey', a particularly relevant song for touching upon a subject that would become a growing social problem in Italy starting in the following decade, the 1980s. Songs like "Voglio" and "Oggi Ho Imparato A Volare" were optimistic hymns for the revolutionary youth of the Italian left, and "Diesel" celebrated both Finardi's life on the road as a musician and the life of everyday working-class Italians. Finardi started to make his transition from this turbulent period of Italian history and its cultural landscape with the album Blitz and single Extraterrestre in 1978, and Roccando Rollando (Rocking and Rolling) in 1979, which contained Legalizzatela, his song-manifesto for the legalization of cannabis. Other significant hits were Patrizia, and the bitter-sweet ballad Le Ragazze Di Osaka in 1981.

== From the 1980s to the present ==
Since then Finardi has lived periodically abroad, in London, UK, and in the United States. He has appeared at the Mecca of Italian commercial Pop music, the annual musical contest of the Sanremo Festival, which would have been unthinkable in the counter-cultural climate of the 1970s. Through many different collaborations, he has released regular albums: among them, one made entirely of songs with English lyrics, Secret Streets in 1982; the live album Strade (1984), Dolce Italia (1987), the entirely acoustic Acustica in 1993, for which he toured in the same 'unplugged' mode, the re-reading of songs from his back catalogue Cinquantanni in 2002, his exploration of spirituality Il Silenzio e Lo Spirito in 2003, and a return to his youthful love for the Blues with the album Anima Blues in 2005. Eugenio Finardi's most recent works have a large audience, as proven by the success of the album Un Uomo (2007), a compilation of a 30-year-long career, celebrated also in the show Suono in Italian theatres – and released also on DVD – in which Finardi tells his story through a series of monologues. His last work Il Cantante Al Microfono saw him accompanied by a classical music sextet. Eugenio Finardi's albums from the 1970s are considered classics of Italian Rock, and he remains one of Italy's most successful and influential Rock singers and musicians. In 2012 he again entered the music competition of the Sanremo Music Festival with the song E tu lo chiami Dio.

== Discography ==
=== Albums ===
- Non gettate alcun oggetto dal finestrino (1975)
- Sugo (1976)
- Diesel (1977)
- Blitz (1978)
- Roccando rollando (1979)
- Finardi (1981)
- Secret streets (1982)
- Dal Blu (1983)
- Strade (Live, 1984)
- Colpi di fulmine (1985)
- Dolce Italia (1987)
- Il vento di Elora (1989)
- Millennio (1991)
- Musica Desideria (1992)
- Occhi (1996)
- Accadueo (1998; re-released in 1999 with one 1 bonus track)
- Il silenzio e lo spirito (2003)
- Anima blues (2005)
- Un Cantante Al Microfono (2008)
- Fibrillante (2014)

=== Singles ===
- Spacey Stacey/Hard Rock Honey (1973)
- Soldi/Voglio (1975)
- Musica ribelle/La radio (1976)
- Non è nel cuore/Giai Phong (1977)
- E tu lo chiami Dio (2012)

=== Compilations ===
- La forza dell'amore (collection of remastered songs, plus 2 previously unreleased songs, 1990)
- Acustica (1993)
- La forza dell'amore 2 (2001)
- Cinquantanni (2002)
- Un uomo (2007)
- Sessanta (2012)
- Euphonia Suite (rearranged) (2022)

=== Live albums ===
- Strade (1984)
- Suono (2008)
- Un uomo Tour 2009 (2009)
- Musica ribelle Live (2013)
