= L'era del cinghiale bianco =

Studio album by Franco Battiato
- Released: 10 September 1979
- Genre: Progressive rock, pop rock
- Length: 30:22
- Label: EMI Italiana
- Producer: Angelo Carrara

Franco Battiato chronology
L'Egitto prima delle sabbie (1978)	L'era del cinghiale bianco (1979)	Patriots (1980)

Singles from L'era del cinghiale bianco
- 1. "L'era del cinghiale bianco" Released: 1979; 2. "Luna indiana" Released: 1979

L'era del cinghiale bianco (transl. The era of the white boar) is an album by Italian singer-songwriter Franco Battiato. It was released in 1979 by EMI Italiana.

This album marks the return of Battiato to pop, after a period in which he substantially produced experimental music (1972–1978). The title song's theme, the "white boar", is inspired by an ancient Celtic myth.

== Track listing ==
1. "L'era del cinghiale bianco" – 4:14
2. "Magic Shop" – 4:11
3. "Strade dell'est" – 4:18
4. "Luna indiana" – 3:30
5. "Il re del mondo" – 4:34
6. "Pasqua etiope" – 4:25
7. "Stranizza d'amuri" – 5:10

== Personnel ==
- Roberto Colombo, Antonio Ballista – keyboards
- Tullio De Piscopo – Drums
- Alberto Radius – Guitars
- Julius Farmer – Bass Guitar
- Giusto Pio – Violin
- Danilo Lorenzini, Michele Fedrigotti – Piano (in "Luna indiana")

== Charts ==
Weekly chart performance for L'era del cinghiale bianco
Chart (2019)	Peak position
Italian Albums (FIMI)	29
