= Giusto Pio =

Italian musician and songwriter

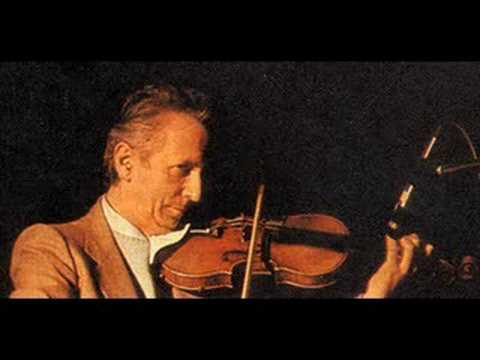
Giusto Pio in 1982

Giusto Pio (11 January 1926 – 12 February 2017) was an Italian conductor, composer, violinist, music educator and songwriter.

Born at Castelfranco Veneto, he studied music in Venice. Later he was engaged as violinist in the RAI orchestra of Milan.

In the late 1970s and early 1980s he became popular as a long-standing collaborator of singer-songwriter Franco Battiato, by whom he was initially hired as violin teacher. Apart from working as a producer and musician on several successful albums with Battiato (including L'era del cinghiale bianco and La voce del padrone), Pio also collaborated with him as a producer for several singers such as Milva, Alice and Giuni Russo.

In 1984 Pio, Battiato and lyricist Rosario "Saro" Cosentino penned the Eurovision Song Contest entry "I treni di Tozeur", performed by Battiato and Alice, which finished 5th in the contest and became a considerable commercial success in Continental Europe and Scandinavia. Pio also released two instrumental LPs (also in collaboration with Battiato) under his own name, entitled Legione straniera (1982) and Restoration (1983).

== Discography ==
- Motore immobile (1979)
- Legione straniera (1982)
- Restoration (1983)
- Note (1987)
- Alla corte di Nefertiti (1988)
- Attraverso i cieli (1990)
- Utopie (1990)
- Missa populi (1995)
- Le vie dell'oro (2000)
