= Gioia e Rivoluzione =

Compilation album by Area
- Released: 1996
- Recorded: 1973–1976
- Genre: Jazz fusion; Italian progressive rock
- Length: 54:10
- Label: Cramps Records
- Producer: Area

Area chronology
Parigi-Lisbona (1996)	Gioia e Rivoluzione (1996)	Chernobyl 7991 (1997)

Gioia e Rivoluzione is the third compilation of the jazz fusion band Area and was released in 1996. This album concentrates exclusively on the albums released on the Cramps label. Just like the first compilation "Anto/Logicamente", this album contains "Citazione da George L. Jackson", the non-LP b-side of "L'internazionale". "L'Internazionale" appears as well, but instead of the studio version released on the single (which has only re-appeared on the other compilation "Area '70" so far), it's the live version contained on the "Are(a)zione" album. The studio version, as of 2014, is not available on CD.

== Track listing ==
1. Luglio, Agosto, Settembre (nero) (1973) - 4:29
2. Arbeit Macht Frei (1973) - 8:01
3. L'Abbattimento dello Zeppelin - 6:55
4. Cometa Rossa (1974) - 3:58
5. Lobotomia (1974) - 4:01
6. L'Elefante Bianco (1975) - 4:36
7. La Mela di Odessa (1920) (1975) - 6:46
8. Gioia e Rivoluzione (1975) - 4:39
9. L'Internazionale (1974) - 4:02
10. Evaporazione (1976) - 1:56
11. Il Massacro di Brandeburgo n. 3 in Sol Maggiore (1976) - 2:31
12. Citazione da George L. Jackson (1974) - 3:18

== Personnel ==
- Giulio Capiozzo - drums, percussion
- Patrizio Fariselli - electric piano, piano, clarinet, synthesizer
- Demetrio Stratos - vocals, organ, harpsichord, steel drums, percussion
- Ares Tavolazzi - bass, trombone (only on tracks from 1974 on)
- Paolo Tofani - guitar, synthesizer, flute
- Eddie Busnello - saxophone (1973 tracks)
- Patrick Djivas - bass, double bass (1973 tracks)
