= Tick tock =

Tick tock, tic toc, Tik Tok and other variants may refer to:

== Arts, entertainment and media ==
=== Fictional entities ===
- Tick-Tock (Marvel character), a fictional Marvel Comics character
- Tick-Tock, a fictional crocodile from the Peter Pan TV series Jake and the Never Land Pirates
- Project Tic-Toc, a plot element in the TV series The Time Tunnel
- Tik-Tok (Oz), a character in the Oz novel series by L. Frank Baum

=== Film and TV ===
- Tick Tock (film), a 2018 Pakistani animated adventure film
- Tik Tok (2016 film), a Chinese-South Korean suspense crime drama
- Tiktok (film), a 2015 Ugandan silent short film
- Tik Tok (2023 film), an Indian Tamil-language film

=== Literature ===
- Ticktock (novel), a 1996 comedy/horror novel by Dean Koontz
- Tik-Tok (novel), a 1983 science-fiction novel by John Sladek
- Tik-Tok of Oz, a 1914 novel by L. Frank Baum

=== Music ===
- Tick Tock (band), from Puerto Rico
- Tick Tock, a 2009 album by Gazpacho (band)
- "Tic Toc" (Lords of the Underground song), 1994
- "Tic Toc" (LeAnn Rimes song), 2002
- "Tick Tock" (Clean Bandit and Mabel song), 2020
- "Tick Tock" (Lemar song), 2007
- "Tick Tock" (Young Thug song), 2021
- "Tick-Tock" (Albina Grčić song), 2021
- "Tick Tock (Beat The Clock)", a song by Rainie Yang, 2010
- "Tik Tok" (song), by Kesha, 2009
- "Tik Tok" (G.E.M. song), 2018
- "Tic Toc", a song by 6ix9ine featuring Lil Baby from Dummy Boy
- "Tick Tock", a song by Aldous Harding from Warm Chris
- "Tic Toc", a song by Baby Cham from Ghetto Story
- "Tic Toc", a song by Merrill Nisker from Fancypants Hoodlum
- "Tic-Toc", a song by Belanova from Sueño Electro I
- "Tick Tock", a song by Beverley Craven from Mixed Emotions
- "Tick Tock", a song by Joji from the album Nectar
- "Tick Tock", a song by Twice from the album Celebrate
- "Tick-Tock", a 2014 song by Mariya Yaremchuk
- "Tick-Tock", a song from the musical Company
- "Tik Tok", a song by Bob Sinclar featuring Sean Paul, 2010
- "TikTok", a 2024 song by Fede Vigevani
- "Tick, tock", repeating lyrics in "4 Minutes" by Madonna

=== Television ===
- "Tick Tock", a teaser for the TV series Watchmen
- "Tick Tock", a Ninjago episode
- "Tick Tock", a 2024 episode of Bridgerton

=== Other uses in arts, entertainment and media ===
- TikTok, a social media platform
- Tick-tock (journalism), a story focused on a chronological order of events
- TicToc, former name of social media brand Bloomberg Quicktake

== Other uses ==
- Tic Toc Airport, in Chile
- Tic Tocs, a brand of biscuit by Arnott's Group
- Tiimely, formerly known as Tic:Toc, an Australian platform technology company
- Tic Toc, a cheerleading stunt
- Tick–tock model, a microprocessor development model by Intel
- "Tick...tock...", the onomatopoeia sound of a pendulum clock

== See also ==
- Tic Tac (disambiguation)
- Tic Toc Tic, a 2010 album by The Zolas
- Tik and Tok, a British musical duo
- "Tick-Tock, Bitches", an episode of TV series Pretty Little Liars
