= Oxo =

Oxo or OXO may refer to:

== Astronomy ==
- Oxo (crater), an impact crater located in dwarf planet Ceres

== Business ==
- Oxo (food), a brand of food products in the UK, South Africa and Canada
- Oxo Tower, a London landmark formerly owned by the makers of Oxo food products
- OXO (kitchen utensils brand), a US-based manufacturer of ergonomic handheld kitchen utensils

== Chemistry ==
- Oxo ligand, a divalent ligand
- oxo-, a prefix in the formal IUPAC nomenclature for the functional group '=O' (a substituent oxygen atom connected to another atom by a double bond)
- Hydroformylation, an industrial process for the production of aldehydes from alkenes
- Oxo-degradation, degradation resulting from oxidative and cell-mediated phenomena, either simultaneously or successively
- Oxo alcohol, alcohols that are prepared by adding carbon monoxide (CO) and hydrogen

== Computing ==
- OXO (video game), one of the first video games, a version of tic-tac-toe from 1952

== Music ==
- OXO (band), an 80s New Wave pop band
- "OXO", a 2015, number one US dance song, by Olivia Somerlyn

== Sports ==
- Oxo (horse), a racehorse, winner of the 1959 Grand National

== Other uses ==
- Tic-tac-toe (OXO, and various other synonyms) a pen-and-pencil game

== See also ==
- Oxxo
- Tic Tac Toe (disambiguation)
- Noughts and crosses (disambiguation)
