= Parigi-Lisbona =

Live album by Area
- Released: 1996
- Recorded: Fête de l’Humanité, Paris; Festa do Avante, Lisboa 1976
- Genre: Jazz fusion; progressive rock
- Length: 56:59; 65:06 (2002 reissue)
- Label: Cramps Records
- Producer: Area

Area chronology
Concerto Teatro Uomo (1996)	Parigi-Lisbona (1996)	Gioia e Rivoluzione (1996)

Parigi-Lisbona is a live album by Italian jazz fusion band Area, released in 1996 and recorded in 1976 in Paris and Lisbon, while the band was supporting their third album Crac!. In the Paris section of the album, Demetrio Stratos announces the songs in French and sings "La Mela di Odessa" as "La Pomme de Odessa". Just like the other phostmous release "Concerto Teatro Uomo", "Parigi-Lisbona" received criticism due to the sound quality of the recordings, and because some tracks contain edits.

This album in 2002 was repackaged with other phostomous live album Concerto Teatro Uomo on the boxset Live Concerts Box. This second version contains two bonus tracks (not taken from either concert).

== Track listing ==
1. "L'Elefante Bianco" – 5:23
2. "Megalopoli" – 8:09
3. "La Mela di Odessa" – 8:59
4. "Lobotomia" – 4:13
5. "Presentation Concerts Lisboa" – 3:27
6. "Arbeit Macht Frei" – 8:28
7. "Cometa Rossa" - 7:17
8. "Luglio, Agosto, Settembre (Nero)" – 6:52
9. "L'Internazionale" – 4:15

=== Bonus tracks on the "Live Concerts Box" ===
10. "Zizina Zamirizar" – 5:00
11. "Canto dei Pastori" – 3:07

Tracks 1–4 from Paris, 5–9 from Lisbon

== Personnel ==
- Giulio Capiozzo - drums, percussion
- Patrizio Fariselli - electric piano, piano, clarinet, synthesizer
- Demetrio Stratos - vocals, organ, clavicembalo, steel drums, percussion
- Ares Tavolazzi - bass, trombone
- Giampaolo Tofani - guitar, synthesizer, flute
