= Splatterpink =

Italian avant-garde band

- Origin: Bologna, Italy
- Genres: Punk Rock, Jazzcore
- Years active: 1990-2003, 2012-present
- Labels: Underground Records, Audioglobe
- Members: Diego D'Agata; Federico Bernardi; Ivano Zanotti; Alessandro Meroli
- Past members: guitar: Metello Orsini (1990-1993); Alessandro Cavazza (1993) Federico Bernardi (1993-) drums: Alistair Brison (1990-1991); Alberto Melega (1993); Leonardo Saracino (1993-1999) Christian Rovatti (1999-2001)
- Website: facebook.com/Splatterpink2012

Splatterpink is an Italian avant-garde band founded in 1990 by lead singer and bass player Diego D'Agata, known as well for being part of Jazzcore duo Testadeporcu. Its extremely original and complex music, surreal and cynical lyrics, has been ahead of most of its Italian contemporaries and its quality was noted abroad, notably by John Peel, who often broadcast them during his shows for BBC.

== History ==
Splatterpink was formed in 1990 by Diego D'Agata (bass guitar and lead singer), Metello Orsini (guitar) and Alistair Brison (drums). The trio expressed themselves with a raw, aggressive form of music, which characterized their first demo, "One". However, their lineup would endure many changes before the band achieved its definitive sound. After Brison returned to his native Scotland, the band went through several drummers until Alberto Melega took the job on a temporary basis. Guitarist Alessandro Cavazza (Orange) took Orsini's place for a short while, after which he was succeeded by Federico Bernardi. The introduction of baritone player Alessandro Meroli prompted a more experimental approach, which resulted in drummer Leonardo Saracino taking over for Melega.

In 1995, the band recorded their debut album, "Industrie Jazzcore". Soon after its release, Splatterpink won first prize in a national competition called "Omaggio a Demetrio Stratos". Two years later, the band (which had been touring for almost three years) went on to record 1997's "Nutrimi" for Italian label Underground Records. The album received very positive reviews from fans and critics alike.

Splatterpink proceeded to play many gigs all over Italy, and became widely recognized as an Italian pioneer of "jazzcore". During this time, British radio personality John Peel sent the band a very kind and heartfelt letter, which informed them that both of their albums were on the BBC's playlist. Soon after, Splatterpink performed at the Biennale of Young Artists in Turin, and began opening for bigger acts such as Ozric Tentacles, Nomeansno, P.J.Harvey, and Asian Dub Foundation.

In 1999, new member Christian Rovatti took over on drums. However, his collaboration with the band was not successful. This compelled the other members to use a drum machine for several important gigs, which included an event in Mostar (Bosnia), where Splatterpink represented Italy's underground music scene.

The band released its third album—entitled "#3"—in 2001. However, many fans and critics felt that it didn't compare to previous albums. Additionally, Splatterpink was finding it difficult to see live gigs y 2003 the group is disbanded. In 2012 the four musicians decide to get back together, pushed by a strong fans base reputation and to explore new boundaries with the latest formation which include the great drummer Ivano Zanotti. They released an EP on 2014, April and the new album work "Mongoflashmob"was released for Locomotiv Records on December 1, 2014.

=== Albums ===
- 1995 - Industrie jazzcore (Suoni Sospetti) 4
- 1999 - Nutrimi (Underground Records)
- 2001 - #3 (Audioglobe)
- 2014 - Dolan Aproevd (EP, Locomotiv Records) limited edition
- 2014 - Mongoflashmob (Locomotiv Records) out on December 1

=== Compilation ===
- 1997 - Andate a lavorare teppisti (Scandellara Records)
- 1999 - Tracce (Wallace Records)
- 2002 - Canzoni d'eroi (Exploit - CGIL)
- 2013 - Fonderie Jazzcore (Impatto Sonoro)
