= Live 2012 (Area album) =

Live album by Area
- Released: 20 November 2012
- Recorded: 2010–2012
- Genre: Jazz fusion; Italian progressive rock
- Length: 87:58
- Label: Up Art Records
- Producer: Area

Area chronology
Live in Torino 1977 (2004)	Live 2012 (2012)

Live 2012 is the ninth album of the jazz fusion band Area. It was recorded in 2011 and 2012 during their reunion tour, which marked the return of Paolo Tofani and Ares Tavolazzi who had left the band in 1977 and 1993, respectively. Classic drummer Giulio Capiozzo died in 2000 of a heart attack, his replacement is drummer Walter Paoli.

The album is divided in two parts. The first CD includes old songs by the band, in new arranged versions. Most of them are instrumentals (due to the absence of Demetrio Stratos, who died in 1979), except for "La Mela di Odessa", narrated by Tofani, and "Cometa Rossa", sung by special guest singer Maria Pia de Vito. This CD also includes a "live" performance of "Sedimentazioni", a track released in "Chernobyl 7991", which contains every track Area has ever recorded, overlying in top of each other. The second CD consists of duets and solo performances and it was the first part of some of the concerts of the tour; this second CD contains a piano solo re-arrangement of Seikilos epitaph, the oldest surviving example of a complete composition, and a variation on "Nefertiti" by Wayne Shorter.

In this album, Paolo Tofani plays the Trikanta Veena, a special synth guitar he invented himself, with three necks.

== Track listing ==
=== CD 1 ===
1. "La Mela di Odessa" (Fariselli, Tavolazzi, Tofani) - 5:15
2. "Cometa Rossa" (Fariselli, Tavolazzi, Tofani) - 9:05
3. "Luglio, Agosto, Settembre (nero)" (Fariselli) - 5:35
4. "Nervi Scoperti" (Fariselli, Tavolazzi, Tofani) - 10:48
5. "Gerontocrazia/L'Elefante Bianco" (Fariselli, Tavolazzi, Tofani) - 8:08
6. "Arbeit Macht Frei" (Fariselli) - 9:12
7. "Sedimentazioni" (Fariselli) - 2:41

=== CD 2 ===
1. "Encounter #1" (Fariselli, Tofani) - 5:43
2. "Encounter #2 (Skindapsos)" (Fariselli, Tavolazzi) - 7:01
3. "Trikanta Veena Suite" (Tofani) - 8:43
4. "Encounter #3" (Tofani, Tavolazzi) - 7:32
5. "Canzone di Seikilos" (trad., arranged by Fariselli) - 4:31
6. "Aten (variazioni su Nefertiti di W. Shorter)" (W. Shorter, arranged by Tavolazzi) - 3:43

== Personnel ==
- Patrizio Fariselli - electric piano, synthesizer
- Paolo Tofani - trikanta veena, electric guitar, live electronics, santoor, vocals on "La Mela di Odessa"
- Ares Tavolazzi - bass, double bass
- Walter Paoli - drums

=== Guest musicians ===
- Maria Pia De Vito - lead vocals on "Cometa Rossa"
