= Aussie (financial group) =

Australian retail financial services group

AHL Investments Pty Ltd
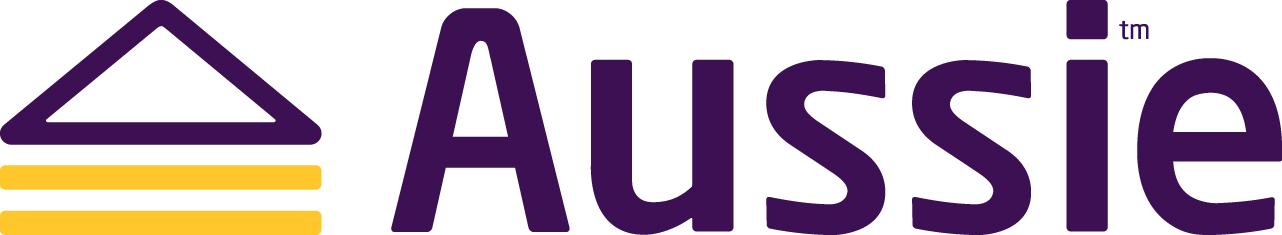
- Type: Private company
- Founded: 1992; 34 years ago
- Headquarters: Sydney, Australia
- Area served: Australia
- Key people: John Symond (Executive Chairman and Founder) James Symond (Chief Executive Officer)
- Services: Mortgage broking, home loans, personal loans, credit cards, insurance
- Parent: Lendi
- Website: www.aussie.com.au

Aussie is an Australian retail financial services group with operations spanning all mainland capital cities and major regional centres throughout Australia. As of April 2012, Aussie reported a loan book under management of over A$42 billion through 750 brokers and 150 stores.

== History ==
The firm was founded as Aussie Home Loans on 17 February 1992 by owners, executive chairman John Symond, together with his nephew, James Symond, and former executive director, Nick Paten, as mortgage provider, using the slogan "We'll save you". John Symond owned 90% of the company, with Nick Paten retaining a 10% stake.

The company was unique in its approach to home loans, offering 24 hours a day service and lower interest than loans offered by banks. In 1994 the firm securitised its loan book, allowing them to offer loans upwards of 3% cheaper than its competitors. The company rapidly grew as consumers became aware of its products and banks were forced to copy its methods as their market share diminished.

In 2002, the company began to run down its loan book and re-positioned itself as a mortgage broker, and introduced its own credit card shortly thereafter. In August 2008, Commonwealth Bank acquired a 33% stake in Aussie. In February 2009, the firm acquired Wizard Home Loans. The deal saw the loan book expand to more than A$31 billion. Aussie also acquired Wizard's franchise distribution network, including 99 retail outlets and 200 brokers. A further acquisition was made in July 2012 of National Mortgage Brokers which added a stand-alone wholesale aggregation channel of 200 broker businesses and loan book of $8.5 billion thus taking the total loan book under Aussie Group management in excess of $50 billion through 950 brokers.

On 18 December 2012, Commonwealth Bank increased its share of ownership to 80% then to 100% in August 2017. In December 2020, Commonwealth Bank announced plans to divest 55 per cent of its holding in Aussie Home Loans in a deal that would merge the company with fellow mortgage broker Lendi. In 2021 the company partnered with the Australian fintech Tic:Toc Home Loans to offer its own online home loan.

== Advertising and sponsorship ==
In 2009, following its acquisition of Wizard Home Loans, Aussie took over Wizard's sponsorship of the Rugby League's New South Wales State of Origin team for the next two years, and also inherited the sponsorship of Collingwood Football Club in the Australian Football League (AFL). Both deals lasted for two seasons (2009–2010), before Aussie withdrew. In the former case, it came in the fallout from New South Wales' fifth (of eight) consecutive State of Origin series defeat.

In 2002, the firm purchased naming rights to Sydney Football Stadium in a five-year plus five-year deal, with the stadium renamed Aussie Stadium. On 7 July 2007 the stadium reverted to its original name, after Aussie elected not to extend the deal.
