= Live 2012 =

Live 2012 may refer to:

- Live 2012, an album by Area
- Live 2012, a live album by Coldplay
- Cranberries Live 2012, a live album by The Cranberries
- Thin Lizzy Live 2012, a live album by Thin Lizzy
- Apothoesis: Live 2012, a live album by Firewind
- Steps Live 2012, a live album by Steps
