= Romina Daniele =

- Born: 8 February 1980 (age 46); Naples, Italy
- Genres: electronic music, experimental, contemporary, electro-acoustic, Blues, Rhythm and blues
- Occupations: Vocalist, composer, performer, writer
- Instruments: Vocals, electronics
- Years active: 2005–present
- Label: RDM Records
- Website: rominadaniele.com

Romina Daniele (born 8 February 1980 in Naples) is an Italian exponent of the vocal extended technique, an avant-garde and blues singer, a composer of electronic and experimental music, vocalist and performer associated with contemporary music, writer, photographer. Since 2005, she has been working on sound research in the fields of vocalism and electronic music, and since 2013 she has been working as blues singer as well.

In 2005 she has been awarded with the Demetrio Stratos International Prize for musical experimentation for the emerging artist best project, proposing the project Diffrazioni Sonore (RDM, 2005–2010). The Career Awards have been received by Diamanda Galás in 2005, Meredith Monk in 2007, Fred Frith in 2008, and Fátima Miranda in 2009.

She has been a finalist at ‘Premio Nazionale delle Arti' (Arts National Award) for Electronic Music and New Technologies, presenting the composition for voice and electronics La Prova, taken from her second record Aisthànomai, il Dramma della Coscienza (RDM, 2008–2010) in 2010 edition, and presenting the electro-acoustic composition La Natura Assente in 2011 edition.

In 2011 she has been awarded with the 'Arci Award' for musical experimentation promoted by the Italian contemporary music centre "Centro Musica Contemporanea" in collaboration with the Italian cultural associations Arci, presenting a preview from her new work titled Spannung. The related concert took place at the big stage area of "Carroponte" (Sesto San Giovanni, Milan) in July 2011. The project has been presented in its different stages during the last performances as well, while detailed information has been given by the artist on the occasion of the 'Arci Award'.

Between 2006 and 2012, she presented her work and research at many prestigious festival like Arezzo Wave, Electronika Festival Aterforum Festival – during the meeting with Meredith Monk, 5 Giornate per la Nuova Musica Festival – with which she has been collaborating since 2008, Salone Internazionale del Libro; London Hoxton Festival; Intermidia Festival – Slovakia; gaining attention from the international press as well.

In the middle of 2013, she founded the band with which mainly pays homage to the greatest women of rhythm and blues, "to bring back and bring up that unique and originary strength, passion and pain, today forgotten especially in Europe; that is one thing with my deeper work". The band has been performing since May 2013 all over the Milan area.

As she said, "the Blues is at the center as feeling and intention in a variety of styles that will allow us to cross – within the limits of our ability – the twentieth century, from Swing to Fusion". (Romina Daniele on One TV)

Between electronics and vocal experimentation, live studio session in solo and with the band, extended vocalism and blues, her latest record is a triple cd titled Spannung produced between 2009 and 2015, and released on December the 24th 2015. The book Voce Sola – essay on the vocal discourse to be released in 2016 – has been written during the same years.

== Life and works ==
Daniele was born and grown in Naples, where she studied classic dance and classic guitar, and started to write poems, tales, songs, to paint and to photograph since she was a child. In the Nineties she participated to exhibitions and was noted and mentioned by local and national magazines. The poems written between 1995 and 2005 are today part of the collected poems book Poesie 1995–2005, English and Italian bilingual edition (RDM, 2010).

After the studies on Art criticism, aesthetics and Cinema at the University of Naples Suor Orsola Benincasa, and that in vocals with Auli Kokko (singer for Daniele Sepe's band), Daniele focuses herself in musical activity moving to Milan in 2005, where "the climate for experimental singing is more receptive", and where she received the Stratos Prize and has gone through different professional experiences as well.

During the academic year 2006–2007 she teaches the results of her vocal research included in the record Diffrazioni Sonore at "Crams School of Music" in Lecco (Italy), working for collective experimental laboratories, concerts, and individual lessons as well.

Diffrazioni Sonore, released in 2005 and her first album project, "consists entirely of multi-tracked, and entirely improvised vocal music, some of it treated digitally (radical EQ, echo, and a little reverb), but otherwise left well enough alone", and is focused on the relationship between improvisation and construction.

The second record Aisthànomai, il Dramma della Coscienza, released in 2008, for voice and electronics, is focused on sound research in the fields of vocalism and electronic music, including compositions with texts in Italian, English and French. Consisting of textual philosophizing more abundantly, it can be read like a theoretical work, an organized anthology and a poetical-musical form.

As Rick Moody writes, Daniele's approach seems to come more from the wilds of literature, and particularly from the wilds of European philosophy, than from any rigorous background in music. Both the two released records are, in fact, loaded with literature references, as a quick look at the booklets points out. They both include "theoretical line texts" which look like essays or manifestos; on one hand these essays explain the foundation of Daniele's musical activity, coming mostly from contemporary philosophy, in particular from the French philosophy by Gilles Deleuze, Jacques Derrida, Roland Barthes and the theoretic-linguistic vision by Pier Paolo Pasolini; on the other hand, as Dionisio Capuano remarks, "her theoretic will can hamper the total fruition".

In the interviews Daniele declares herself to be devoted to "feeding doubt and a whirlpool of feelings, my primarily aim is structuring thought: a human one." Otherwise, music with new technologies is elected as research device, superior to every other one, in the study on the human being; in the same way, the voice is the most powerful mean of human expression, from an anthropological, physiological, and linguistic point of view, and just secondly a musical instrument. In particular:

Diffrazioni Sonore is a result of the research I have been conducting since 2000 in a number of areas: voice, composition by electronic means, philosophy applied to multimedia. Studying film history and theory, art criticism and aesthetic analysis, I approached the fields of thought that my research is based on, which include Gilles Deleuze’s philosophy and Michel Chion’s theory applied to film, a multimedia art form. I am referring specifically to the linguistic and morphological foundations of my work, by virtue of the relationship between, and coexistence among, different languages, including voice, poetry, writing, music, electronics, art, thought, man. (Romina Daniele on the Rumpus)

In an interview on the Rockerilla magazine, she also mentioned film-makers and painters as influences for her musical work: "Fyodor Dostoyevsky and Marcel Proust, Friedrich Nietzsche and Henri Bergson, Jusepe de Ribera and Francis Bacon, David Lynch and Michelangelo Antonioni."

Between 2006 and 2008, during the work on her second record Daniele wrote the essay Ascenseur pour l'échafaud, Il luogo della musica nell'audiovisione (RDM, 2011), in English: the site of music in Audio-Vision, title which reminds to two previous studies, one is the Site of Film by Christian Metz , the other is Audio-Vision by Michel Chion. As a matter of fact, the essay is the dissertation thesis with which Daniele degreed Cum Laude in Cinema Studies, supervised by professor Augusto Sainati from the Sorbonne of Paris, who has been studying the cinema combining the semiotic analysis and the historical and sociological points of view for a long time. Daniele's thesis is focused on the relationship between music and image in the cinema, conducted through the detailed analysis of the French movie Ascenseur pour l'échafaud (1959) by Louis Malle, with soundtrack by Miles Davis. Furthermore, Daniele honours the Davis soundtrack covering the piece Nuit sur les Champs-élysées in the second record.

At the end of 2008, she starts studying electronic music, as post graduate studies, at the Milan Conservatory, which led her to one of the finalists for the 'National Award of Arts' in 2010 and 2011.

In the same year she also starts working in the field of silent movies screened with live improvisations by a collaboration with Riccardo Sinigaglia Electro-acoustic ensemble.

Between the 2008 and 2011 she dedicated herself to literature production, publishing the books mentioned above and the essay Il dialogo con la materia disintegrata e ricomposta, un'analisi di Thema (Omaggio a Joyce) di Luciano Berio (RDM, 2010). It is an analysis of Thema (Omaggio a Joyce) by Luciano Berio, described as the first electro-acoustic composition in the history of western music made entirely with voice and elaboration of it by technological means. The voice was that of the great American avant-garde singer Cathy Berberian, reading from the Ulysses by James Joyce. Thus, this book is categorized as a biography, and also as an autobiography as can be found in Google Books. On the other hand, Daniele has been working on the essay Voce Sola (Solo Voice) for some years, a book describing her aesthetic and linguistic research in all fields of her activity, mostly focused on music and vocalism.

Considering the contemporary western music and its twentieth-century history from the Musique concrète to the experimental music, to the most recent experiences on technology applied to music, her work seems focused on a kind of electronic music as sound research or sound art. From the vocal point of view her work is focused on the transfiguration of the song form through the organic changing of the voice, vocals-electronics assimilation, the dramatic experimentation on the text-vocals, sound poetry and the total theatre-song:

A peculiar combination of different disciplines including theatre, philosophy, aesthetics and electronics used as a movie soundtrack, can be seen as a real opera of avant-garde theatre. Romina Daniele put herself in front of the audience stimulating it and producing a thrilling and a charming sound with vocals creating dark/shining atmospheres throwing the listener in a lyrics-voice-music spiral that oblige us to confront with ourselves. (Alessio Arena on Drexkode)

Although, as Moody remarks, Daniele's work "is not only complex, only demanding, only methodical, but, actually, though it has its challenges, it is also playful, sweet, sometimes funny, and, on occasion, rooted in an appreciation of vernacular music like jazz, blues, and pop."

In fact, speaking about her Blues live concerts, Romina Daniele said:

I am doing the Blues today because I feel it like a shear, vertical push that starts from the inside, comes out from every pore and goes straight to the heart. And this is one thing at the base of my work, which very often has been positively welcomed in the contemporary avant-garde fields and similar, where sometime, it can happen, the fundamental things of life are lost which indeed are the strength and the instinctivity of the emotions. (Romina Daniele on Rock n Roll Radio)

Between 2009 and 2012 she studies New Technologies and Electronic Music at the Milan Conservatory. And so, as said before, she represented the Conservatorio di Milano at the final stage of ‘Premio Nazionale delle Arti' (Arts National Award) 2010 and 2011 editions. She studied with Riccardo Sinigaglia, Alessandro Melchiorre, Giovanni Cospito; she has attended many workshops and seminars among which we can mention those of Meredith Monk, Trevor Wishart, David Moss and Annette Vande Gorne. RDM Records was born in 2010 through her collaboration, with the purpose of promoting research and the technical and aesthetic autonomy.

The title of her latest record is Spannung, from German: tension, opening of the research. Particularly significant in this work is the cycle of the Dasein, divided in three parts and themes, which is the title of her 2010–2012 performances as well. Dasein, from German as well: being; in Martin Heidegger's philosophy: being the here, to be at stake of one's being into the being itself.

As Romina Daniele said, both the record and the book Voce Sola – essay on the vocal discourse:

indicates the opening, the space, the tension (and the yearning) of being in the size of the authenticity of existence, that is what we are and are looking for: to be at stake of one’s being into the being itself with everything of us into the world before it goes away in vain. Voice is what there was at the beginning, a question of body and thought, the focus and the cornerstone, and there are no other places or sounds like that at all. Then music is an essential act concerning the apprehension for man and his work as well.

== Discography ==
- Diffrazioni Sonore (RDM, 884502382761, 2005–2010)
- Aisthànomai, il Dramma della Coscienza (RDM, 634479662485, 2008–2010)
- Spannung (RDM, 190394052294, 2015)

== Writings ==
- Il dialogo con la materia disintegrata e ricomposta, un'analisi di Thema (Omaggio a Joyce) di Luciano Berio (RDM, ISBN 9788890490514, 2010)
- Poesie 1995–2005 (RDM, 9788890490507, 2011)
- Ascenseur pour l'échafaud, Il luogo della musica nell'audiovisione (RDM, ISBN 9788890490590, 2011)
