= Are(A)zione =

Live album by Area
- Released: 1975
- Recorded: Parco Lambro, Milano; Festa dell'Unità, Napoli; Festa della Gioventù, Rimini; Teatro Comunale, Reggio Emilia 1975
- Genre: Jazz fusion; Italian progressive rock
- Length: 41:46
- Label: Cramps Records
- Producer: Area

Area chronology
| Crac! (1975) | Are(A)zione (1975) | Maledetti (Maudits) (1976) |

Professional ratings
Review scores
| Source | Rating |
|---|---|
| Allmusic | 4.5/5 stars |

Are(A)zione is the fourth album of the jazz fusion band Area. It is Area's first live album. It was recorded during their 1975 Italian tour, with dates in Milan, Naples, Rimini and Reggio Emilia, and released later the same year.

The first of the album concentrates on live versions of some of the band's classics, the flip side features the title-track and a lengthy instrumental which introduces the drum pattern of the song "Giro, Giro, Tondo" (later to be included in the band's following studio album Maledetti (Maudits)), and closes with the Socialist anthem "L'internazionale" as covered by the band in a 1974 single.

The track timings listed on the back cover are slightly incorrect. The actual running time for each track is reported below.

== Track listing ==
All tracks by Patrizio Fariselli, Ares Tavolazzi & Giampaolo Tofani

=== Side one ===
1. "Luglio, Agosto, Settembre (nero)" – 5:41
2. "La Mela di Odessa" – 11:05
3. "Cometa Rossa" – 6:00

=== Side two ===
1. "Are(A)zione" – 15:00
2. "L'Internazionale" – 4:00

== Personnel ==
- Giulio Capiozzo - drums, percussion
- Patrizio Fariselli - electric piano, piano, clarinet, synthesizer
- Demetrio Stratos - vocals, organ, harpsichord, steel drums, percussion
- Ares Tavolazzi - bass, trombone
- Giampaolo Tofani - guitar, synthesizer, flute
