= Tic Tac (disambiguation) =

Tic Tac is a brand of small, hard mint.

Tic Tac or variants may also refer to:

- Tic-tac (horse racing), a traditional method of signs used by bookmakers
- Tic Tac (film), a 1997 Swedish thriller
- Tic (musician) (Nana Kwaku Okyere Duah), formerly known as Tic Tac
- Tic tac bass, a method of playing baritone guitar
- Tic&Tac, a 1980 album by Area
- Tic Tac (TV series), a Chilean telenovela
- Tick! Tack!, a 2005 visual novel by Navel
- Tiktak, a Finnish music group
- Tik Tak, a Belgian children's TV programme
- Ticktack, a game similar to backgammon
- Tick-Tack, a 2024 song by Illit
- Tic Tac, a UFO description in the Pentagon UFO videos

== See also ==
- Tic Tac Toe (disambiguation)
  - Tic-tac-toe, a pencil-and-paper game also known as noughts and crosses
- "Tic, Tic Tac", a 1997 song by Carrapicho
- Tick tock (disambiguation)
