= Chernobyl 7991 =

Studio album by Area
- Released: 1997
- Recorded: 1997
- Genre: Jazz fusion; Italian progressive rock
- Length: 58:56
- Label: Sony Music Entertainment
- Producer: Area

Area chronology
Gioia e Rivoluzione (1996)	Chernobyl 7991 (1997)	Live in Torino 1977 (2004)

Chernobyl 7991 is the eighth album of the jazz fusion band Area and was released in 1997. This is the first album in 17 years, and Area had been on hiatus from 1983 to 1993. They first reunited as a trio consisting of Fariselli, Capiozzo and Tavolazzi. Tavolazzi, after the first shows, left the band in order to pursue other projects. Much like the previous studio album "Tic&Tac" from 17 years earlier, this album is much more of a jazz/fusion product than Area's classic sound. This is the only album with bass player Paolo dalla Porta, who replaced Tavolazzi.

The album is completely instrumental, apart from some vocalizations on "Fall Down". "Sedimentazioni" consists of approximately five minutes of silence and one minute and a half containing excerpts from every track Area recorded in their career overlying on top of the other. "Efstratios" is dedicated to past member and singer Demetrio Stratos who died in 1979, whose real name was, in fact, Efstratios.

To date, this is the latest studio album (but not the latest non-phostumous) to be released by Area. In 2000, Capiozzo died of a heart attack and the band disbanded seemingly for good. In 2009, a line-up of Fariselli, Tavolazzi and the band's classic guitar player Tofani reunited and, as of 2014, is still active.

== Track listing ==
All songs by Patrizio Fariselli except where noted.

1. "15.000 Umbrellas (1° parte)" – 5:26
2. "15.000 Umbrellas (2° parte)" – 6:15
3. "Liquiescenza" – 2:13
4. "Wedding Day" – 4:34
5. "Chernobyl 7991" – 5:12
6. "Fall Down" – 3:49
7. "Il Faut Marteler" – 4:34
8. "Efstratios" – 5:30
9. "Mbira & Orizzonti" (Fariselli, Dalla Porta) – 5:30
10. "Colchide" – 3:08
11. "Deriva (Sogni Sognati Vendensi)" (Capiozzo) – 6:35
12. "Sedimentazioni" – 6:10

== Personnel ==
- Patrizio Fariselli – acoustic piano, keyboards and electric piano
- Giulio Capiozzo – drums
- Paolo Dalla Porta – double bass

=== Guest musicians ===
- Piero Condorelli – guitar on "Wedding Day" and "Mbira & Orizzonti"
- Gigi Cifarelli – guitar on "Chernobyl 7991"
- Stefano Bedetti – saxophone on "Mbira & Orizzonti"
- John Clark – french horn on "15.000 Umbrellas"
- Marino Paire – vocals on "Fall Down"
