= Katakuti (disambiguation) =

Katakuti (lit. 'tic-tac-toe') may refer to:

- Katakuti, is a village development committee in Dolakha District, Nepal
- Katakuti (web series), a 2022 Indian Bengali-language web series

== See also ==
- Tic Tac Toe (disambiguation)
