= Maledetti (Maudits) =

Studio album by Area
- Released: 1976
- Studio: Fono-Roma-Milano Sound Recording
- Genre: Jazz fusion; Italian progressive rock
- Length: 39:18
- Label: Cramps Records
- Producer: Area

Area chronology
Are(A)zione (1975)	Maledetti (Maudits) (1976)	Anto/Logicamente (1977)

Professional ratings
Review scores
Source	Rating
Allmusic	2.5/5 stars

Maledetti (Maudits) is the fifth album of the jazz fusion band Area and was released in 1976. It can be considered a concept album: during the 20th century, an imaginary bank in which history is stored, loses data from the 15th century ("Evaporazione"), causing people forgetting how to govern the world. Some new hypothesis are formulated: power to old people ("Gerontocrazia"), power to women ("SCUM", which uses as lyrics a reading of a writing by Valerie Solanas, the chief of the feminist party SCUM, which stands for "Society for Cutting Up Men"), and power to children ("Giro, giro, tondo" and "Caos (parte seconda)"). "Il Massacro di Brandeburgo numero tre in Sol Maggiore" is a fragment of Johann Sebastian Bach's third Brandenburg concerto. During the recording sessions of the album, Capiozzo and Tavolazzi left the band temporarily (noticeably they are absent on "Diforisma Urbano", "Giro, giro, tondo" and "Caos (parte seconda)") only to come back some months later. During these months in which they weren't in the band, the live album Event '76 was recorded at Milan's Università Statale. This was also the last studio album featuring Tofani on guitar. Most of CD re-releases contain two bonus tracks: an interview with Stratos, Tofani and Fariselli after the "Event '76" concert and the "Are(A)zione" version of "L'internazionale". From this album's tour, two posthumous concerts from 1977 were released: "Concerto Teatro Uomo" in 1996 and "Live in Torino 1977" in 2005.

== Track listing ==
=== Side one ===
1. "Evaporazione" – 1:45
2. "Diforisma Urbano" – 6:18
3. "Gerontocrazia" – 7:30
4. "SCUM" – 6:30

=== Side two ===
1. "Il Massacro di Brandeburgo numero tre in Sol Maggiore" – 2:20
2. "Giro, giro, tondo" – 5:55
3. "Caos (parte seconda)" – 9:00

== Personnel ==
- Giulio Capiozzo - Drums, Percussion (on "Gerontocrazia" and "SCUM")
- Patrizio Fariselli - Electric Piano, Piano, Clarinet, Synthesizer
- Demetrio Stratos - Vocals, Organ, Clavicembalo, Steel Drums, Percussion
- Ares Tavolazzi - Bass, Trombone (on "Gerontocrazia" and "SCUM")
- Giampaolo Tofani - Guitar, Synthesizer, Flute

=== Guest musicians ===
- Eugenio Colombo - kazumba (on "Evaporazione")
- Hugh Bullen - bass (on "Diforisma Urbano" and "Giro, giro tondo")
- Walter Calloni - drums (on "Diforisma Urbano" and "Giro, giro tondo")
- Steve Lacy - soprano sax (on "Gerontocrazia" and "Caos (parte seconda)")
- Anton Arze & Jose Arze - txalaparta (on "Gerontocrazia")
- Paul Litton - percussion (on "Caos (parte seconda)")
- Paolo Salvi - cello (on "Il Massacro di Brandeburgo numero tre in Sol Maggiore")
- Giorgio Garulli - contrabass (on "Il Massacro di Brandeburgo numero tre in Sol Maggiore")
- Umberto Benedetti Michelangeli - violin (on "Il Massacro di Brandeburgo numero tre in Sol Maggiore")
- Armando Burattin - viola (on "Il Massacro di Brandeburgo numero tre in Sol Maggiore")
