= Area '70 =

Compilation album by Area
- Released: 1980
- Recorded: Fono-Roma-Milano Sound Recording
- Genres: Jazz fusion; Italian progressive rock
- Length: 41:01
- Label: Cramps Records
- Producer: Area

Area chronology
Tic&Tac (1980)	Area '70 (1980)	Concerto Teatro Uomo (1996)

Area '70 is the second compilation of the jazz fusion band Area and was released in 1980. Unlike the other compilation "Anto/Logicamente", this one was never reprinted on CD. It featured the studio version of "L'Internazionale" which was only released as a single (and never on CD).

== Track listing ==
=== Side one ===
1. "Luglio, Agosto, Settembre (nero)" (1973) – 4:27
2. "Cometa rossa" (1974) – 4:00
3. "Gioia e Rivoluzione" (1975) – 4:40
4. "L'elefante Bianco" (1975) – 4:33
5. "L'Internazionale" (1974) – 3:04

=== Side two ===
1. "La Mela di Odessa (1920)" (1975) – 6:27
2. "Gerontocrazia" (1976) – 7:30
3. "SCUM" (1976) – 6:30

== Personnel ==
- Giulio Capiozzo - drums, percussion
- Patrizio Fariselli - electric piano, piano, clarinet, synthesizer
- Demetrio Stratos - vocals, organ, clavicembalo, steel drums, percussion
- Ares Tavolazzi - bass, trombone (only on tracks from 1974 on)
- Giampaolo Tofani - guitar, synthesizer, flute
- Eddie Busnello - saxophone (1973 tracks)
- Patrick Djivas - bass, double bass (1973 tracks)
