= Caution Radiation Area =

Studio album by Area
- Released: 1974
- Recorded: Fono-Roma-Milano Sound Recording
- Genre: Jazz fusion; Italian progressive rock; experimental rock
- Length: 31:53
- Label: Cramps
- Producer: Area

Area chronology
Arbeit Macht Frei (1973)	Caution Radiation Area (1974)	Crac! (1975)

Professional ratings
Review scores
Source	Rating
Allmusic	3/5 stars

Caution Radiation Area is the second album of the jazz fusion band Area and was released in 1974. This is the first album that contains the better known line up, with Ares Tavolazzi replacing Patrick Djivas on bass. "MIRage? Mirage!" contains a part in which the whole band can be heard whispering readings (for example a negative review of Arbeit Macht Frei, a TV guide), and "Lobotomia" (which means "lobotomy") is constructed using loud synth noise, with the clear intention to disturb the listener (as pointed out on the booklet). Quotes of opening themes of Italian TV programs are heard during the track.

The lyrics for "Cometa Rossa" are sung in Greek. "Brujo" means "witch" in Spanish. In 2016, italian journalist Donato Zoppo had written 'Caution Radiation Area. Alle fonti della musica radioattiva', an essay about the making of the album.

== Track listing ==
Side one

1. "Cometa rossa" – 4:00
2. "ZYG (Crescita Zero)" – 5:27
3. "Brujo" – 8:02

Side two

1. "MIRage? Mirage!" – 10:27
2. "Lobotomia" – 3:57

== Personnel ==
- Demetrio Stratos - vocals, organ, harpsichord, steel drums, percussion
- Giampaolo Tofani - guitars, synthesizer, flute
- Patrizio Fariselli - electric and acoustic pianos, synthesizer, bass clarinet
- Ares Tavolazzi - electric bass, double bass, trombone
- Giulio Capiozzo - drums, percussion
- Piero Bravin - Engineering
- Ambrogio Ferrario - Engineering
