= Tic-Tac-Toe barb =

Tic-Tac-Toe barb is a common name used for two separate species of barbs:

- Ticto barb (Puntius ticto), a subtropical freshwater fish
- Pethia stoliczkana, a fresh water tropical cyprinid fish

== See also ==
- Tic Tac Toe (disambiguation)
