= Tic&Tac =

Studio album by Area
- Released: 1980
- Recorded: 1980
- Genre: Jazz fusion; Italian progressive rock
- Length: 41:21
- Label: Ascolto
- Producer: Area

Area chronology
Event '76 (1979)	Tic&Tac (1980)	Area '70 (1980)

Professional ratings
Review scores
Source	Rating
Allmusic	(?)

Tic&Tac is the eighth album of the jazz fusion band Area and was released in 1980. It is the first album without Demetrio Stratos as he died a year earlier, and it is generally more jazzy than progressive. This is the only album in which Larry Nocella performs. After releasing this, Area toured until 1983, then disbanded. Giulio Capiozzo in 1986 formed a jazz fusion band called Area II, but was the only original member. Area reformed officially in 1993 with a concert in Rome, as a trio, with Ares Tavolazzi, Patrizio Fariselli and Capiozzo. However, they didn't record anything new in studio until 1997 when the album "Chernobyl 7991" was released (without Tavolazzi). This album is completely instrumental, save for the final track "Antes de Hablar Abra la Boca".

== Track listing ==
=== Side one ===
1. "La Torre Dell'Alchimista" (Fariselli) – 5:50
2. "Danza ad Anello" (Fariselli) – 5:13
3. "A.S.A." (Fariselli) – 4:34
4. "Lectric Rag" (Fariselli) – 1:50
5. "La Luna Nel Pozzo" (Fariselli) – 3:41

=== Side two ===
1. "Tic & Tac" (Fariselli) – 4:38
2. "Quartet" (Tavolazzi) – 2:12
3. "Sibarotega" (Fariselli) – 4:16
4. "Chantee D'Amour" (Tavolazzi) – 4:47
5. "Antes de Hablar Abra la Boca" (Fariselli) – 4:22

== Personnel ==
- Patrizio Fariselli – acoustic and electric piano, synthesizers
- Larry Nocella – tenor sax
- Giulio Capiozzo – drums
- Ares Tavolazzi – electric bass, double bass, guitar

=== Guest musicians ===
- Guido Guidoboni – trumpet in "Danza ad anello" and "Sibarotega"
- Luciano Biasutti – trumpet in "Antes de Hablar Abra la Boca"
- Pino Vicari – voice in "Antes de Hablar Abra la Boca"
