= Mikel Dufrenne =

French philosopher and aesthetician (1910-95)

Mikel Dufrenne (French: [dyfʁɛn]; 9 February 1910, Clermont, Oise – 10 June 1995, Paris) was a French philosopher and aesthetician. He is known as an author of existentialism and is particularly noted for the work The Phenomenology of Aesthetic Experience (Phénoménologie de l'expérience esthétique, 1953).

He encountered the work of Karl Jaspers while being a prisoner of war in a camp with Paul Ricœur. Dufrenne and Ricœur later collaborated on a book on Jaspers.

He founded the Department of Philosophy at the University of Paris. His students included Daniel Charles and Louis Marin.

He was also president of the Société Française d’Esthétique for over 20 years.

== Works ==
- Karl Jaspers et la philosophie de l'existence, 1947
- Phénoménologie de l'expérience esthétique, 1953; Eng. tr., The Phenomenology of Aesthetic Experience (1973)
- La personnalité de base, 1953
- La Notion d'a priori, 1959; Engl. tr., The Notion of the A Priori (1966)
- Jalons, 1966
- La philosophie du néopositivisme, 1967
- Pour l'homme, 1968
- (with Paul Ricœur) Karl Jaspers et la philosophie de l'existence (1974)
- Esthétique et philosophie (two volumes, 1976)
