= John Symond =

Australian businessman (born 1947)

John Symond AM
- Born: John Joseph Symond; 17 August 1947 (age 79); Crookwell, New South Wales, Australia
- Education: St Patrick's College, Strathfield; St Laurence's College; Homebush Boys High School
- Occupation: Entrepreneur
- Years active: 1965−present
- Children: 2

John Joseph Symond AM (born 17 August 1947) is an Australian entrepreneur, former financial executive, and the founder of Aussie Home Loans.

== Early life ==
Symond was born on 17 August 1947 in Crookwell, New South Wales, and raised in Sydney. He spent most of his time between Brisbane, where his mother's family lived, and Sydney, near his father's relatives. He was one of seven children and the son of Lebanese immigrant fruit shop owners, and he regularly helped at his parents' shop before and after school.

He attended eleven different schools, including St Patrick's College, Strathfield, St Laurence's College, South Brisbane and Homebush Boys High School, where he matriculated in 1965. After leaving school, Symond studied law and joined a firm in Bankstown where he learned conveyancing and specialized in property and finance.

== Career ==
By the late 1980s, he had created a boutique financial services company, Mortgage Acceptance Corporation (MAC), that specialised in finding and providing commercial and investment loans to investors. One of Australia's first mortgage brokers, he eventually undertook a joint venture with Beneficial Finance, a subsidiary of State Bank of South Australia. When State Bank of South Australia went broke in the 1980s, he came within a whisker of bankruptcy, and it was this negative experience with a bank that formed the basis of the Aussie philosophy – offering better deals and better customer service to everyday Australians.

=== Aussie Home Loans ===
Supported by a $10,000 loan from his older brother Michael, Symond founded Aussie Home Loans in February 1992 and was able to fulfil his ambition. With his founding nephew James by his side, the Symond’s were widely credited with bringing competition to the Australian home-lending industry and was the first major disruptor to the banks oligopoly of the Australian home loan market. The company was unique in its approach to home loans, offering 24-hours-a-day service and loans far cheaper than those offered by banks. In 1994, Aussie introduced securitisation to its home loans, allowing it to offer loans upwards of 3% cheaper than its competitors. In 2002, Aussie Home Loans diversified to become a mortgage broker, offering bank and non-bank products.

The company rapidly grew as consumers became aware of its products and that of other non-banks, and the competition heated up. In August 2008, the Commonwealth Bank acquired a 33% stake in Aussie. Aussie acquired Wizard Home Loans in February 2009 and National Mortgage Brokers (nMB) in 2012. The Commonwealth Bank increased its investment in Aussie from 33 per cent to 80 per cent in May 2013, then to 100 per cent in August 2017, at a time when Aussie was Australia's largest retail mortgage broker. Symond was the chairman of Aussie from 2017 until November 2020; while his nephew, James Symond, continues to serve as the chief executive officer.

== Personal life ==
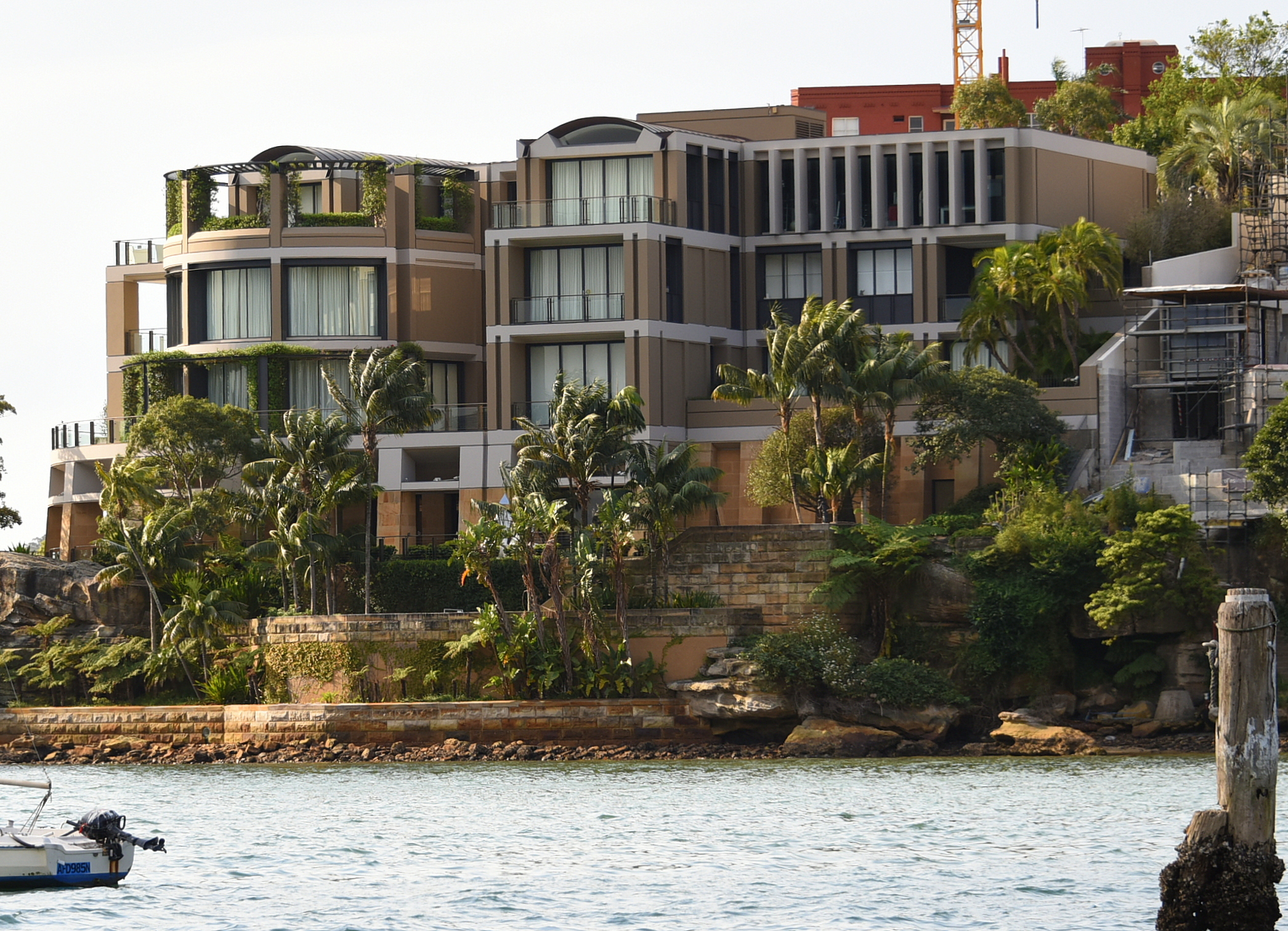
Symond's home Wingadal, in Point Piper

Symond has two children, Stephen and Deborah. He has been involved with numerous organisations such as Jeans for Genes and is a former chairman of the Sydney Opera House Trust.

Symond was married to Amber McDonald from February 2016 to December 2023.

He has a substantial collection of Australian art deco and contemporary art including works of Brett Whiteley and Sidney Nolan. In 2017, he took delivery of a 73-metre (240 ft) Dutch-built Feadship named Hasna, believed to have cost more than $150 million.

Symond built a palatial home called Wingadal, designed by leading architect Alec Tzannes, in the Sydney suburb of Point Piper that is now estimated to be worth over $200 million. He put it on the market in 2016 but withdrew it two months later in 2017. In May 2024 Symond put Wingadal on the market once again for an expected price of AU$250 million.

=== Net worth ===
As of May 2025, Symond's net worth was assessed as A$832 million, as published in the Financial Review Rich List 2025.

Year	Financial Review Rich List		Forbes Australia's 50 Richest	
Year	Rank	Net worth (A$)	Rank	Net worth (US$)
2017		$673 million		
2018	134 ▲	$621 million ▼		
2019	157 ▼	$638 million ▲		
2020	112 ▼	$891 million ▲		
2021	135 ▼	$800 million ▼		
2022	162 ▼	$800 million		
2023	177 ▼	$780 million ▼		
2024		$780 million		
2025	184	$832 million ▲		

Legend
Icon	Description
Steady	Has not changed from the previous year
▲	Has increased from the previous year
▼	Has decreased from the previous year

== Awards ==
Symond was appointed a Member of the Order of Australia in 2002 for service to the mortgage industry in Australia, particularly the home finance sector, and to the community. In 2004, he was inducted into the Australian Banking and Finance Magazine's Hall of Fame in May 2004 – the first non-banker to be admitted.

In August 2011, he was listed eighth in a poll by The Australian Financial Review of the most influential business, economic and political leaders of the past 60 years. In August 2012, he was named Australian Father of the Year. In July 2013 he was honoured with the 2013 Gold Harold Humanitarian Award, at the sixth annual Gold Harold Awards, for his ongoing philanthropic interest in children's causes and charities.
