= 1978 Gli Dei Se Ne Vanno, Gli Arrabbiati Restano! =

1978 Gli dei se ne vanno, gli arrabbiati restano!

Studio album by Area
- Released: 1978
- Recorded: "Sciascia Sound", Rozzano, April 1978
- Genres: Jazz fusion; Italian progressive rock
- Length: 39:47
- Label: Ascolto
- Producer: Area

Area chronology
| Anto/Logicamente (1977) | 1978 Gli dei se ne vanno, gli arrabbiati restano! (1978) | Event '76 (1979) |

1978 Gli dei se ne vanno, gli arrabbiati restano! ("The gods depart, the angry remain!"), the sixth album of the jazz fusion band Area, released in 1978. It is the first album without guitarist Paolo Tofani and the first album whose lyrics were not written by Gianni Sassi. Also, noticeably, it is the only album in which Demetrio Stratos is credited as a composer.

== Track listing ==
All tracks are written by Stratos, except where noted.

Side One
| No. | Title | Length |
|---|---|---|
| 1. | "Il Bandito del Deserto" | 3:13 |
| 2. | "Interno con Figure e Luci" (Fariselli, Stratos) | 4:07 |
| 3. | "Return from Workuta" | 3:02 |
| 4. | "Guardati dal Mese Vicino all'Aprile" | 5:12 |
| 5. | "Hommage a Violette Nozieres" | 3:18 |

Side Two
| No. | Title | Length |
|---|---|---|
| 1. | "Ici on Dance!" | 3:27 |
| 2. | "Acrostico in memoria di Laio" (Fariselli) | 6:12 |
| 3. | "FFF (Festa, Farina e Forca)" (Capiozzo, Fariselli, Tavolazzi) | 3:49 |
| 4. | "Vodka Cola" (Fariselli, Stratos, Capiozzo, Tavolazzi) | 7:27 |

== Personnel ==
- Giulio Capiozzo – drums, vibraphone, percussion
- Patrizio Fariselli – piano, organ, electric piano, ARP Odyssey, Pro-Soloist, polymoog, omnichord
- Ares Tavolazzi – electric & acoustic bass, acoustic guitar, mandola, trombone, pocket trumpet, vocals
- Demetrio Stratos – vocal, organ, electric & acoustic piano, ocarina
