= Arbeit macht frei (album) =

Studio album by Area
- Released: 1973
- Genres: Jazz fusion; Italian progressive rock; experimental rock
- Length: 36:24
- Label: Cramps Records
- Producer: Area

Area chronology
Arbeit macht frei (1973)	Caution Radiation Area (1974)

Singles from Arbeit macht frei
- 1. "L’abbattimento dello Zeppelin "/" Arbeit Macht Frei" Released: 1973

Professional ratings
Review scores
Source	Rating
Allmusic	4.5/5 stars

Arbeit macht frei is the debut studio album by Italian jazz fusion band Area, and one of the most critically acclaimed albums in Italy. It features singer Demetrio Stratos along with bassist Patrick Djivas (best known for his subsequent work with Premiata Forneria Marconi) and saxophonist Eddie Busnello, both of which parted after the release of the album. According to the booklet, the lyrics were written by Gianni Sassi (credited under the alias "Frankenstein") and the music was composed by Demetrio Stratos, Giulio Capiozzo and Patrick Djivas (with the exception of "Consapevolezza", co-written with Patrizio Fariselli). All tracks were registered on the Italian copyright society SIAE under the name of Terzo Fariselli (Patrizio's father), because no one within the group was a member of SIAE.

The record blends free jazz, rock (especially progressive), Mediterranean/mid-Eastern folk and avantgarde music. It has often been described as "radical music" for its extreme musical choices, but also for its strong political stances: the tracks address pro-Palestinian themes and other social topics, establishing the group as a point of reference within the strong left-wing milieu of the period. Its title (Arbeit macht frei, "work sets [you] free") quotes the famous inscription located on the gates of many concentration camps from World War II, particularly Auschwitz-Birkenau: this acts both as a provocation towards current political events, and as a critique on modern society and capitalism (the latter feeling expressed in the lyrics of the title track and of "Consapevolezza").

In 2012, the album ranked ninth on Rolling Stone's list of the 100 best Italian albums of all time.

== Songs ==
"Luglio, Agosto, Settembre (nero)" ("July, August, (black) September") became Area's first and most recognizable hit. Said to be built around the melodies of Greek traditional song "Gerakina" (but actually inspired by Don Ellis' "Bulgarian Bulge"), the track's lyrics are a bold statement over the current situation in the Middle East. In most of the released 7", the word "nero" ("black") - a reference to Black September, an armed conflict in Jordan and later the name of a Palestinian terrorist organization - was censored, and the track received little to no radioplay. It was released only as a jukebox 7", with the song "Miña" (by Italian prog band Aktuala) on its b-side.

"L'Abbattimento dello Zeppelin" ("The knock-down of the Zeppelin"), as stated by Demetrio Stratos on the posthumous live release "Concerto Teatro Uomo", was composed after one time in which, while playing in a pub, they were asked to perform the song "Whole Lotta Love" by Led Zeppelin: not knowing it, they instead improvised what later became L'Abbattimento and got fired. Guitarist Paolo Tofani can be heard quoting the main riff of Whole Lotta Love during his solo. It is the most experimental track off the album, drawing many influences from free jazz and aiming to destroy the usual musical structures; it was also released as a 7" with the album's title track on the b-side, but failed to chart.

== Track listing ==
Side one

1. "Luglio, Agosto, Settembre (nero)" – 4:27
2. "Arbeit macht frei" – 7:56
3. "Consapevolezza" – 6:06

Side two

1. "Le labbra del tempo" – 6:00
2. "240 chilometri da Smirne" – 5:10
3. "L'Abbattimento dello Zeppelin" – 6:45

== Personnel ==
- Eddie Busnello - saxophone
- Giulio Capiozzo - drums, percussion
- Patrick Djivas - bass, double bass
- Patrizio Fariselli - electric and acoustic pianos
- Demetrio Stratos - vocals, organ, steel drums
- Giampaolo Tofani - guitar, VCS3
- Gaetano Ria - engineering
