= Area (Italian band) =

Italian rock band

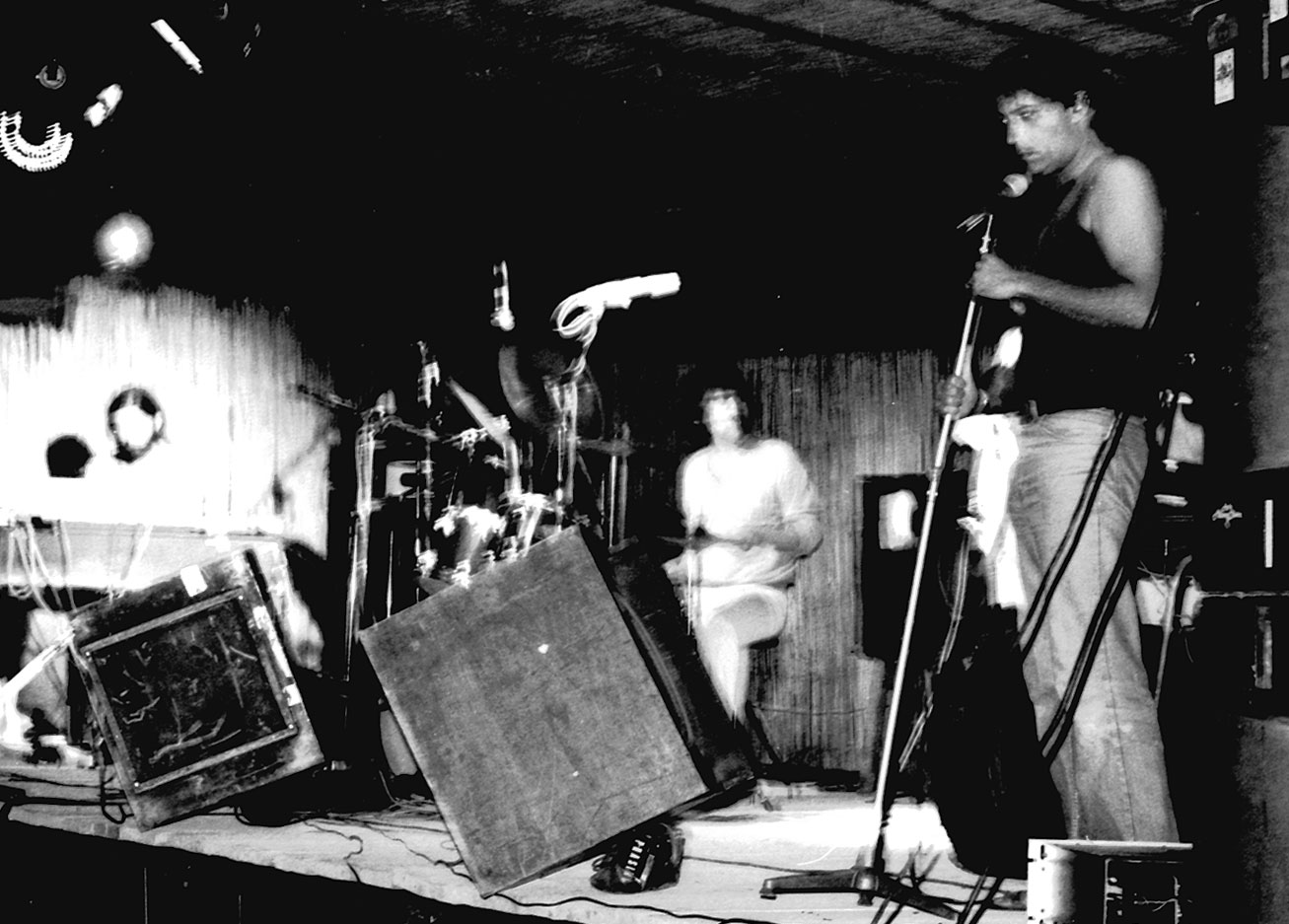
- Area performs in Castelmassa (Rovigo), Italy, 1978

Background information
- Origin: Milan, Italy
- Genres: Progressive rock; art rock; free jazz; jazz rock; experimental; electronic
- Years active: 1972–1983, 1993–1999, 2009–present
- Labels: Cramps, Ascolto, Sony
- Spinoffs: Area II
- Members: Patrizio Fariselli; Ares Tavolazzi; Paolo Tofani; Walter Paoli
- Past members: Demetrio Stratos; Giulio Capiozzo; Eddie Busnello; Leandro Gaetano; Johnny Lambizzi; Patrick Djivas; Massimo Urbani; Pietro Tonolo; Sara Borsarini; Guido Guidoboni; Larry Nocella; Paolo Dalla Porta; Pietro Condorelli; Angela Baggi; Marco Micheli
- Website: area-internationalpopulargroup.com

Area – International POPular Group, most commonly known as Area or AreA, are an Italian progressive rock, jazz rock, electronic, experimental group formed in 1972 by singer Demetrio Stratos and drummer Giulio Capiozzo. They are considered one of the most respected, innovative and important bands of the blooming 1970s Italian progressive rock scene.

== History ==
=== Demetrio Stratos' years: 1972–1979 ===
Area were formed in Milan in 1972. They were originally composed of Demetrio Stratos (vocals), Giulio Capiozzo (drums and percussion), Victor Edouard "Eddie" Busnello (saxophone and flutes), Leandro Gaetano (piano), and Johnny Lambizzi (guitar), soon followed by Patrick Djivas (bass) and Patrizio Fariselli (keyboards). The band was led by Stratos, who was originally from Egypt, having been born in Alexandria to Greek parents. In 1973, Lambizzi left the band and was replaced by Paolo Tofani (guitar and synthesizer). That year, they recorded their first studio album Arbeit macht frei ("Work Brings Freedom"), taken from the inscription that was found on the gate at the entrance to Auschwitz Nazi concentration camp. It was released by Cramps Records and the band performed in many musical and cultural events. Area went on tour in Chile and, representing Italy, took part in the eighth Biennale de Paris. At that time, Area's sound was a mish-mash that drew from rock, jazz, Eastern, and Arabic music. The band soon grew to prominence because the youth of the time were able to identify with Area's socialist lyrics, and the band was founded on a strong and virtuoso musicianship.

In 1974, Eddie Busnello and Patrick Djivas left the band. Djivas, who would later play with Premiata Forneria Marconi, was replaced by Ares Tavolazzi (bass). Early in the band, Area had prominent saxophone work from Busnello but when he left, the Area sound became more guitar and keyboard oriented. The new line-up was composed of Demetrio Stratos on vocals, Hammond organ and steel drum; Giulio Capiozzo on percussion; Patrizio Fariselli on piano and keyboards; Ares Tavolazzi on bass and trombone; and Paolo Tofani on guitar and VCS 3 synthesizer.

Gianni Sassi, founder of the Cramps Records label, took care of the group's image and was an unofficial member of the group. Sassi was involved in nearly all of the cultural projects of the time and was a component of the Italian Fluxus movement, the international network of artists, composers, and designers noted for blending different artistic media and disciplines in the 1960s. Area held a "therapeutic" concert at the Psychiatric Hospital of Trieste, directed by Franco Basaglia. They recorded their second studio album Caution Radiation Area, and played at the Parco Lambro Festival in Milan and at the first International Festival of Rovereto. They represented Italy at the first Pop Festival of Bern and performed at the Velodromo Vigorelli event against the Vietnam War together with Joan Baez.

During 1975, the number of their live performances and exhibitions increased. They participated at the second Parco Lambro Festival and at the "Festa Nazionale de L'Unità" in Florence; in November of that year, Area recorded their third studio album Crac!, and their recordings were published for the first time in France.

It was the mid-1970s and live events roused enthusiasm as never before; they fulfilled the need to be together and the illusion of continuing as a person. Area ... (was) a head above the rest. Not only because they seemed to be more attentive to the themes outside the world of music ... nor due to their interest in the use of instruments which seemed vaster and futuristic, but above all because ... (of) an incomparable coherence in their everyday work and in the steadfastness (sic) with which they faced even their contradictions.

— "Riflusso," resistances, unoccupied roads

In 1976, their recordings were distributed in Japan. They were featured at the third Parco Lambro Festival. That year, Area played around 200 concerts in Italy. They were invited to take part in the Fête de L'Humanité, held in the working class suburbs of Paris at Le Bourget, near Aubervilliers, and at the Festa do Avante! in Lisbon. Giulio Capiozzo and Ares Tavolazzi left the group for a couple of months to meet the Andrea Mingardi Orchestra. Fariselli, Tofani, and Stratos did a concert at the University of Milan with Steve Lacy and Paul Lytton, and from that concert their live album was released, Event 76. Area recorded their fourth studio album Maledetti with the Arze brothers, Steve Lacy, Paul Lytton, Walter Calloni, and Hugh Bullen as guest musicians.

During a concert at the Teatro Uomo in Milan in 1977, the band presented their compilation album Anto/Logicamente, and Paolo Tofani left the group.

In 1978, Area left the Cramps record label for Ascolto, a record label owned by CGD; in that year, their fifth studio album was released, 1978 Gli Dei Se Ne Vanno, Gli Arrabbiati Restano!. In March, they played three concerts in Lisbon, Coimbra, and Porto in Portugal; in July, the band had two dates in Havana, Cuba at the World Festival of Youth and Students (for Anti-Imperialist Solidarity, Peace and Friendship).

1979 was the year of study, experimentation, and research. Members of the group guested on PFM violinist/flautist's first solo album, "Mauro Pagani" (released in Tokyo in 1979 on Seven Seas and distributed by King Record Co.) with contributions by Demetrio Stratos, Giulio Capiozzo, Patrizio Fariselli, and Ares Tavolazzi ("L'Albero Di Canto" and "L'Albero Di Canto II" with Area members backing Pagani exclusively). Later Demetrio Stratos left Area, and Fariselli, Capiozzo, and Tavolazzi recruited several musicians: Massimo Urbani, Pietro Tonolo, Sara Borsarini, and Guido Guidoboni. In April 1979, Demetrio Stratos was diagnosed with a severe case of aplastic anemia. His condition deteriorated rapidly and he was transferred to New York City Memorial Hospital for treatment. Meanwhile, in Italy, his friends organized a concert to pay for his medical expenses. Many musicians accepted the invitation to perform, and the concert was planned for 14 June 1979. It was to become Demetrio Stratos' memorial concert, where over a hundred musicians played in front of an audience of 100,000. He died in New York City Memorial Hospital on 13 June 1979 at the age of thirty–four, while waiting for a bone marrow transplant (the official cause of death was myocardial infarction, more commonly known as heart attack). The band, Demetrio Stratos, Patrizio Fariselli and Paolo Tofani were included in the Nurse with Wound list, a list of musicians and bands that accompanied the first album by Nurse With Wound, entitled Chance Meeting on a Dissecting Table of a Sewing Machine and an Umbrella and released in 1979.

Area released five studio albums and two live albums before Demetrio Stratos's death in 1979.

=== Post Demetrio Stratos years and Area II: 1980–1986 ===
Tic&Tac, their sixth studio album, was released in 1980. Then, Area released Gli Uccelli ("The Birds"), a Greek classic comedy by Aristophanes, in collaboration with the theatrical company Nuova Scena and directed by Memè Perlini. Gli Uccelli was performed in Italy around 100 times and finished in Brussels in May 1981. Larry Nocella was recruited and the band did several concerts with him.

In 1982, together with Nuova Scena company, they prepared and performed Tristano e Isotta ("Tristan and Iseult"), a theatrical representation with dance and music of that influential romance/tragedy under the choreography and direction of Amedeo Amodio. In 1983, Area disbanded and the musicians continued their musical activities separately. There was a reappearance of Area II in the mid-1980s. Area II released two studio albums, but this was in fact a project by Area drummer Giulio Capiozzo with session musicians. Area II's two albums were released during 1986 and 1987, but were much closer to jazz than the previous Area style of music.

=== First reunion: 1993–2000 ===
In 1993, Patrizio Fariselli, Giulio Capiozzo, and briefly, Ares Tavolazzi, resumed the live activity of Area, experimenting with new sounds, materials, and new languages. Ares Tavolazzi left the band and was replaced by Paolo Dalla Porta and Pietro Condorelli.

Chernobyl 7991, their seventh and last studio album, was released in 1997. Gigi Cifarelli, John Clark and Pietro Condorelli featured as guest musicians. In January, the record was presented at the Centro Sociale Leoncavallo in Milan, where they were denounced for "abuse of musical instruments and serious acoustic pollution". The group commonly known as Area II had several live concerts performed as a trio consisting of Fariselli, Capiozzo, and Paolo Dalla Porta.

In 1998, Marco Micheli replaced Dalla Porta, and the band also recruited Angela Baggi. This line-up toured until its split in 1999. Capiozzo died a year later.

=== Second reunion: 2009–present ===
On 25 August 2009 in Siena, Patrizio Fariselli, Ares Tavolazzi, and Paolo Tofani with Capiozzo's son, Christian on drums, and Mauro Pagani on vocals and violin perform together for the first time in over a decade during the ninth Edition of the festival "La Città Aromatica", dedicated to Demetrio Stratos thirty years after his death. On 29 and 30 January 2010, there was another reunion when Fariselli, Tavolazzi, and Tofani with UT Gandhi (Umberto Trombetta) on drums, played together at the San Lazzaro di Savena (Bologna) theatre as part of "StratosFerico: Omaggio a Demetrio Stratos", a tribute to Demetrio Stratos. On 2 May, Fariselli, Tofani, and Tavolazzi reunited again for a performance at New York's Brecht Forum, accompanied by Italian session drummer Walter Paoli and former collaborator Mauro Pagani on violin and vocals.

The official Reunion Tour started on 21 September 2010 in Milano at Blue Note Club, with Fariselli, Tavolazzi, Tofani, Walter Paoli on drums and Mauro Pagani as special guest. During the Reunion Tour that still continues, AREA had several special guests among them Maria Pia De Vito on vocals. In November 2012 AREA released a new double live CD entitled "Live2012" that features some of the best live performances recorded during the Reunion Tour.

== Band members ==
=== Historical ===
- Demetrio Stratos – lead vocals, organ, steel drums (1972–1978; died 1979)
- Patrizio Fariselli – piano, keyboards (1973–present)
- Paolo Tofani – lead guitar, synthesizer, VCS 3 (1973-1977, 2009–present)
- Ares Tavolazzi – bass guitar, upright bass, trombone (1974–1993, 2009–present)
- Giulio Capiozzo – drums, percussion (1972–2000; died 2000)

=== Current members ===
- Patrizio Fariselli – piano, keyboards (1973–present)
- Paolo Tofani – lead guitar, synthesizer, VCS 3 (1973-1977, 2009–present)
- Ares Tavolazzi – bass guitar, upright bass, trombone (1974–1993, 2009–present)
- Walter Paoli – drums (2010–present)

=== Former members ===
- Demetrio Stratos – lead vocals, organ, steel drums (1972–1978; died 1979)
- Victor Edouard "Eddie" Busnello – saxophone, flute, bass clarinet (1972-1973; died 1984)
- Patrick Djivas – bass guitar (1972-1973)
- Massimo Urbani – saxophone (1979; died 1993)
- Piero Tonolo – saxophone (1979)
- Sara Borsarini – lead vocals (1979)
- Guido Guidoboni – trumpet (1979)
- Larry Nocella – saxophone (1980-1982; died 1989)
- Paolo Dalla Porta - bass guitar, upright bass (1993-1997)
- Pietro Condorelli - lead guitar (1993-1997)
- Angela Baggi – lead vocals (1998-2000)
- Marco Micheli - bass guitar, upright bass (1998-2000)
- Giulio Capiozzo – drums, percussion (1972–2000; died 2000)
- Christian Capiozzo – drums (2009)

=== Pre-first album members ===
- Johnny Lambizzi - guitar (1972)
- Leandro Gaetano - piano (1972)

=== Collaborators ===
- Gianni Sassi - manager, art director, lyricist (1972–1977; died 1993)
- Steve Lacy - saxophone (1976; died 2004)
- Paul Lytton - percussion (1976)
- Walter Calloni - drums (1976)
- Hugh Bullen - bass (1976)
- Anton Arze - txalaparta (1976)
- Josè Arze - txalaparta (1976)
- Eugenio Colombo - kazumba (1976)
- Umberto Benedetti Michelangeli - strings (1976)
- Armando Burattin - strings (1976)
- Paolo Salvi - strings (1976)
- Giorgio Garulli - strings (1976)
- Luciano Biasutti - trumpet (1980)
- Gigi Cefarelli - guitar (1997)
- John Clark - French horn (1997)
- Mauro Pagani - violin (live guest 2009-2010)
- Maria Pia de Vito - vocals (live guest 2011)
- Eugenio Finardi - vocals (live guest 2011)

== Discography ==
=== Studio and live albums ===
- 1973.02 – Arbeit macht frei– Cramps Records (1973) (rist. 1989 – Vinyl Magic / rist. 2013 – Sony Music)
- 1974.03 – Caution Radiation Area – Cramps Records (1974) (rist. 1991 – Vinyl Magic / rist. 2014 – Sony Music)
- 1974.11 – Crac! – Cramps Records (1975) (rist. 1991 – Vinyl Magic / rist. 2014 – Sony Music)
- 1975.09 – Are(A)zione – Cramps Records (1975) (rist. 1991 – Vinyl Magic / rist. 2015 – Sony Music) [LIVE]
- 1976.10 – Maledetti (Maudits) – Cramps Records (1976) (rist. 1991 – Vinyl Magic / rist. 2015 – Sony Music)
- 1976.10 – Event '76 – Cramps Records (1979) (rist. 1994 – Cramps Records / rist. 2015 – Sony Music) [LIVE]
- 1976.11 – Concerto Teatro Uomo – Cramps Records (1996) (rist. 2002 – Akarma) [LIVE]
- 1976.12 – Parigi-Lisbona – Cramps Records (1996) (rist. 2002 – Akarma) [LIVE]
- 1977 - Live in Torino 1977 - (2004) [LIVE]
- 1978.03 – 1978 Gli Dei Se Ne Vanno, Gli Arrabbiati Restano! – Ascolto (1978) (rist. 1991 – Warner Music Italy)
- 1980.05 – Tic&Tac – Ascolto (1980) (rist. 1993 – Warner Music Italy)
- 1996.12 – Chernobyl 7991– Sony Music (1997)
- 2011.11 – Live 2012 – Up Art Records (2012) (Area II Open Project) [LIVE]

=== Anthologies ===
- 1973-1976 – Anto/Logicamente– Cramps Records (1977) (1 LP)
- 1973-1976 – Area '70 – Cramps Records (1980) (1 LP,)
- 1973-1979 – Gioia e Rivoluzione – Cramps Records (1996) (2 CD)
- 1973-1976 – Box Set – Cramps Records / Sony Music (2002) (5 CD)
- 1976 – Live Concerts Box – Cramps Records (2002) (3 CD6)
- 1973-1980 – The Essential Box Set Collection – Cramps Records / Sony Music (2010) (6 CD + 1 DVD)

=== Singles ===
- 1973.02 – L'abbattimento dello Zeppelin/Arbeit macht frei – Cramps Records (1973) (rist. 2014 – Sony Music)
- 1974.05 – L'Internazionale / Citazione da George L. Jackson – Cramps Records (1974) (rist. 2014 – Sony Music)

=== Boxsets ===
- 2002: Live Concerts Box (includes "Concerto Teatro Uomo" and "Parigi-Lisbona")
- 2002: Revolution Boxset (includes ""Arbeit Macht Frei", "Caution Radiation Area", "Crac!" and "Are(A)zione")
- 2010: The Essential Box Set Collection – Cramps Records / Sony Music (2010) (6 CD + 1 DVD)

== Related albums ==
- 1976: Parco Lambro (includes a 1976 live version of "Gerontocrazia")
- 1979: Il Concerto - Omaggio a Demetrio Stratos
- 2013: L'Album Biango (studio album by Elio e le Storie Tese, contains a track written and performed by Area)

== See also ==
- Jazz fusion
- Jazz rock
- World music
