= Anto/Logicamente =

Compilation album by Area
- Released: 1977
- Recorded: Fono-Roma-Milano Sound Recording
- Genre: Jazz fusion; Italian progressive rock
- Length: 40:06
- Label: Cramps Records
- Producer: Area

Area chronology
Maledetti (Maudits) (1976)	Anto/Logicamente (1977)	1978 Gli Dei Se Ne Vanno, Gli Arrabbiati Restano! (1978)

Professional ratings
Review scores
Source	Rating
Allmusic	

Anto/Logicamente is the first compilation of the jazz fusion band Area and was released in 1977. As the title suggests, the track selection focuses more on the tracks that were "hidden, ignored by the critics and many others", as told on the booklet. "Anto/Logicamente" is a play on words based on "antologia" (compilation, in this case), "anto" (not) and "logicamente" (with sense). Noticeably, this album contains "Citazione da George L. Jackson", the b-side of "L'internazionale". Unlike the other compilation "Area '70", this one was reprinted on CD by Artis (CRSCD 006) in 1994 and Edel (CRA 0142032) in 2002.

== Track listing ==
=== Side one ===
1. "L'abbattimento dello Zeppelin" (1973) (Patrizio Fariselli) – 6:52
2. "Arbeit Macht Frei" (1973) (Fariselli) – 7:56
3. "ZYG (Crescita zero)" (1974) – 5:27

=== Side two ===
1. "Citazione da George L. Jackson" (1974) – 3:14
2. "Nervi Scoperti" (1975) (Fariselli, Ares Tavolazzi, Tofani) – 6:35
3. "Area 5" (1975) – 2:09
4. "Gerontocrazia" (1976) – 7:30

== Personnel ==
- Giulio Capiozzo - drums, percussion
- Patrizio Fariselli - electric piano, piano, clarinet, synthesizer
- Demetrio Stratos - vocals, organ, harpsichord, steel drums, percussion
- Ares Tavolazzi - bass, trombone (only on tracks from 1974 on)
- Giampaolo Tofani - guitar, synthesizer, flute
- Eddie Busnello - saxophone (1973 tracks)
- Patrick Djivas - bass, double bass (1973 tracks)
