= Daniel Charles =

French musician, musicologist and philosopher

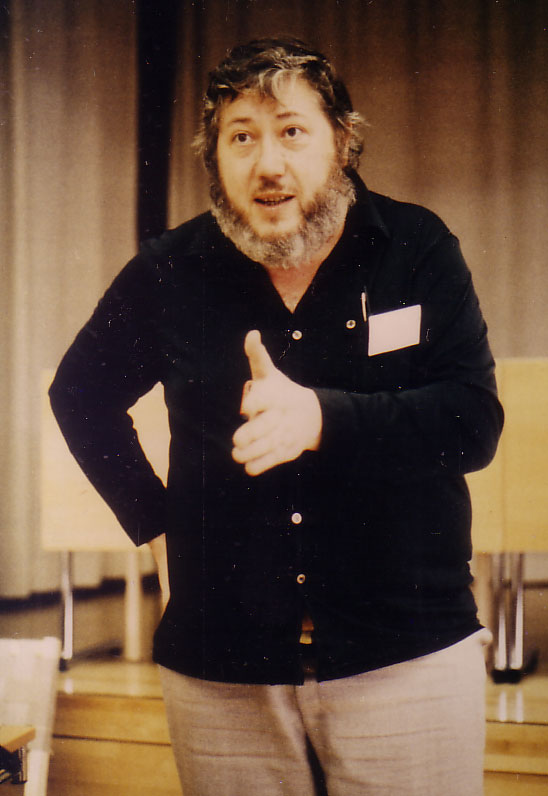
Daniel Charles in 1992

Daniel Paul Charles (27 November 1935 – 21 August 2008) was a French musician, musicologist and philosopher. He was born in Oran (French Algeria) and died in Antibes (France).

== Biography ==
He was a student of Olivier Messiaen at the Paris Conservatory of Music (First Prize, 1956), he received the aggregation in philosophy in 1959 and a PhD under the direction of Mikel Dufrenne in 1977.

After leading (late 1968) the Commission charged with establishing the status of professorship of music at the French Ministry of Education, he founded and lead for twenty years (1969–1989) the Department of Music of University of Paris VIII (Vincennes, and St. Denis). He was also responsible, from 1970 to 1980, for the teaching of general aesthetics at the University of Paris IV (Sorbonne). He decided to end his career by teaching philosophy at the University of Nice Sophia-Antipolis (1989–1999).

When he graduated from the Paris Conservatory of Music in 1956, he participated in the GRM under the leadership of Pierre Schaeffer, and proposed to set into electronic music Stéphane Mallarmé's "Coup de dés" in Darmstadt, a project which caught the attention of Karlheinz Stockhausen. But his lack of enthusiasm toward the "solfège des bruits" of Schaeffer led him to focus instead on John Cage, whom he met in 1958. He contributed then to present Cage's music and philosophy in France: Pour les oiseaux (co-signed with Cage), published first in French (Paris, Belfond, 1976) became a classic book. It was later published in English: For the Birds.

Daniel Charles has been invited by many universities to lecture (usually across the Atlantic, but also including Japan and the Philippines), and has published many articles and several books, five of which have been translated into German, and two into Japanese.

== Publications ==
=== Main Publications ===
- Pour les Oiseaux (Entretiens avec John Cage), Paris, Pierre Belfond, 1976 / L'Herne, 2002. translated in English, German, Spanish, Italian and Japanese.
- Le Temps de la voix, Paris, J.-P. Delarge, 1978 / Hermann, 2011.
- Gloses sur Cage, Paris, U.G.E., Coll. 10/18, 1978 / Desclée de Brouwer, 2002.
- John Cage oder Musik ist los, Berlin, Merve Verlag, 1984.
- Poetik der Gleichzeitigkeit, Bern, Benteli Verlag, 1987.
- Zeitspielräume, Berlin, Merve Verlag, 1989.
- Musketaquid, Musik und Transzendentalismus, Berlin, Merve, 1994.
- Musiques nomades, Paris, Kimé, 1998.
- La fiction de la postmodernité selon l'esprit de la musique, Paris, P.U.F., 2001.

=== Direction of magazines ===
6 special issues of Revue d'Esthétique (from 1968 to 1998), among them: "John Cage" Number 13-14-15 (1989) (Toulouse, Privat / Paris, J.-M. Place).

=== Articles ===
More than 200 articles published in several magazines (Revue musicale, Analyse musicale, VH 101, Traverses, Corps écrit, Exercices de la patience, Le Temps de la réflexion, Etc. Montréal, Parachute, Discourse, The Musical Quarterly, The World and I, Alpha-beta, Il Verri, Synteesi, Musik-Konzepte, etc.), in collective books, and several encyclopedias, prefaces, LPs and CDs booklets, etc.

=== Translations (from English) ===
- Abraham A. Moles, Experimental Music ("Les Musiques expérimentales", Zürich, Cercle d'Art, 1966)
- Alfred North Whitehead, Process and Reality ("Procès et réalité", Paris, Gallimard, 1996 - in collaboration with C.R.H.I., CNRS and University of Nice Sophia-Antipolis).
- John Cage, Je n'ai jamais écouté aucun son sans l'aimer: le seul problème avec les sons, c'est la musique (La Souterraine, Ed. Pierre Courtaud, Coll. La Main courante, 1994).
