= Fátima Miranda =

Spanish singer and researcher

- Born: Salamanca, Spain
- Origin: Salamanca, Spain
- Genres: Avant-garde music, experimental music, extended techniques, overtone singing, throat singing
- Occupations: Musician, music researcher
- Instrument: Vocals

Fátima Miranda is a Spanish singer and researcher born in Salamanca, Province of Salamanca, Spain. She has a bachelor's degree in history of art, with a specialization in modern art. As a singer, her compositions touch several genres like Mongol Song and Indian Dhrupad. She has investigated the human voice and created exclusive voice techniques, classified by tonality and register. Her interest in the avant-garde also covers video, minimal music, stage arts and artist-public contact.

Miranda formed the group Taller de Música Mandana with Llorenç Barber in 1979. She was the director of the phonotheque of Complutense University of Madrid from 1982 to 1989. In 2009, Fátima Miranda was awarded the "Demetrio Stratos" International Prize for experimental music.

Fátima Miranda has published two books about architecture and urbanism. She lives in Madrid.

== Discography ==
- Las Voces de la Voz 1992
- Concierto en directo 1994
- Cantos Robados 1996
- ArteSonado 2000
