= Tick-tock (journalism) =

In journalism, a tick-tock is a type of story that focuses on chronological order of events.
