= Crac! =

Studio album by Area
- Released: August 1975
- Studio: Fono-Roma-Milano Sound Recording
- Genre: Jazz fusion; Italian progressive rock; experimental rock
- Length: 37:50
- Label: Cramps Records
- Producer: Area

Area chronology
Caution Radiation Area (1974)	Crac! (1975)	Are(A)zione (1975)

Professional ratings
Review scores
Source	Rating
AllMusic	3/5 stars

Crac! is the third album of the jazz fusion band Area and was released in 1975. With this album, the band gained more popularity in Italy, thanks to songs like "L'elefante Bianco", "La Mela di Odessa (1920)" and "Gioia e Rivoluzione", which quickly became concert favourites. All songs were written by Tofani, Fariselli and Tavolazzi, except for "Area 5" which was written by Juan Hidalgo and Walter Marchetti. When touring for this album the band even played in Paris and in Lisboa (as documented posthumously in the album "Parigi Lisbona" released in 1976, while a live album from their Italian tour was released later that year).

== Track listing ==
All tracks by Patrizio Fariselli, Ares Tavolazzi & Paolo Tofani except where noted.

=== Side one ===
1. "L'elefante Bianco" – 4:33
2. "La Mela di Odessa (1920)" – 6:27
3. "Megalopoli" – 7:53

=== Side two ===
1. "Nervi Scoperti" – 6:35
2. "Gioia e Rivoluzione" – 4:40
3. "Implosion" – 5:00
4. "Area 5" (Juan Hidalgo, Walter Marchetti) – 2:09

== Personnel ==
- Giulio Capiozzo – drums, percussion
- Patrizio Fariselli – electric piano, piano, clarinet, synthesizer
- Demetrio Stratos – vocals, organ, harpsichord, steel drums, percussion
- Ares Tavolazzi – acoustic bass, electric bass, trombone
- Paolo Tofani – guitar, synthesizer, flute
- Piero Bravin – engineering
- Ambrogio Ferrario – engineering
