= Vocality =

Vocality or special vocal effects are vocal or vocally inspired devices including guttural effects, interpolated vocality, falsetto, blue notes, Afro-melismas, lyric improvisation, and vocal rhythmization. All of the listed devices are attributes of African vocality and are used to emotionalize vocal and instrumental performances in African American vernacular music.

Guttural effects include screams, shouts, moans, and groans. Shouts may be intoned or nonintoned (definite in pitch/sung or indefinite in pitch/spoken). Interpolated vocality is the addition of new vocal sounds or texts (interpolated verbalism) to a song while lyric variation is derived from or embellishes existing lyrics.

== Sources ==
- Stewart, Earl L. (1998). African American Music: An Introduction. ISBN 0-02-860294-3.
