= Tic Tac Toe (disambiguation) =

Tic Tac Toe, also known as noughts and crosses or Xs and Os, is a paper-and-pencil game for two players.

Tic Tac Toe may also refer to:

- Tic Tac Toe (band), an all-female German group
  - Tic Tac Toe (album), 1996
- "Tic-Tac-Toe", a 1990 single by Kyper
- "Tic Tac Toe", a 2019 single by Peakboy with Paul Kim and Heize
- Tic-Tac-Toe, a 1976 video game released for the Fairchild Channel F as part of Videocart-1

== See also ==
- Tic Tac (disambiguation)
- X's and O's (disambiguation)
- Noughts and Crosses (disambiguation)
- Katakuti (disambiguation)
- Tic-Tac-Toe barb, common name used for two species of fish
- OXO (video game), video game created by Alexander S. Douglas
- Tic-tac-toe variants
