= Noughts and Crosses (disambiguation) =

Noughts and Crosses is an alternative name for the game of Tic-tac-toe.

Noughts and Crosses may also refer to:

- Noughts & Crosses (novel series), by Malorie Blackman
- Noughts and Crosses (game show), Australian television game show
- Noughts + Crosses, British television adaptation of the Malorie Blackman novel
- "Noughts and Crosses" (Doctors), a 2004 television episode

== See also ==
- Tic Tac Toe (disambiguation)
- Knots and Crosses, crime novel by Ian Rankin
- Knots and Crosses (Rebus), 2007 episode of STV's Rebus television series
