= Tic Toc Airport =

- IATA: none; ICAO: SCHT

Summary
- Airport type: Private
- Serves: Chaitén, Chile
- Elevation AMSL: 13 ft / 4 m
- Coordinates: 43°36′47″S 72°53′50″W

Map
- Location of Tic Toc Airport in Chile

Runways
Direction	Length		Surface
Direction	m	ft	Surface
02/20	485	1,591	Grass
- Source: Landings.com HERE Maps GCM

Tic Toc Airport (Spanish: Aeropuerto Tic Toc, (ICAO: SCHT)) is an isolated airstrip on an inlet off the Gulf of Corcovado in the Los Lagos Region of Chile. The nearest community is Puerto Raúl Marín Balmaceda (es) 18 kilometres (11 mi) to the south. Chaitén is 78 kilometres (48 mi) north of the airstrip.

There is mountainous terrain east through south of the runway, and rising terrain in all quadrants except west, over the gulf.

== See also ==
- Transport in Chile
- List of airports in Chile
