= Tiimely =

Australian lending company

Tiimely Pty Ltd
- Logo used from November 2023
- Trade name: Tiimely Pty Ltd
- Formerly: Tic:Toc, Tic:Toc Home Loans
- Type: Private
- Industry: Platform technology, Financial technology, Financial services
- Founded: 2015.
- Headquarters: Adelaide, South Australia, Australia
- Area served: Australia
- Key people: Anthony Baum (Organizational founder and CEO)
- Products: Platform technology, Financial technology, Automation technology
- Number of employees: 149
- Website: tiimely.com www.tiimelyhome.com.au

Tiimely, formerly known as Tic:Toc, is an Australian platform technology company and non-bank home lender based in Adelaide, South Australia. Founded in 2015, but launched to the public in July 2017 as Tic:Toc, Tiimely offers Software-as-a-Service, and automated digital home loans to consumers through their retail brand, Tiimely Home. Bendigo & Adelaide Bank are a major shareholder, owning a 27 percent stake in the business.

== History ==
Tiimely was founded in 2015 by Anthony Baum, and secured seed funding in 2016 from Bendigo & Adelaide Bank, who also provide the funds for Tiimely’s home loans. In March 2017, the company closed its Series A funding round, securing A$4.1 million in further funds from Bendigo & Adelaide Bank.

The company officially launched its home loan offering in July 2017. In December 2017, Tiimely announced an expansion of services to include Tasmania, officially expanding their serviceable area to cover all states of Australia.

Tiimely closed a Series B funding round in July 2018, raising A$11.5 million. The raise was led by La Trobe Financial and Genworth Financial’s Australian arm, Genworth Mortgage Insurance Australia.

In November 2018, Tiimely announced it would offer its technology to Bendigo & Adelaide Bank as part of their first enterprise partnership. In March 2019, Bendigo Bank launched Bendigo Express, a digital home loan white-labelled under the Bendigo Bank brand.

On February 5, 2020, Tiimely launched its first software offering, XAI Validate, which uses artificial intelligence and machine learning to automate the validation of customer data. XAI Validate was rebranded to Xapii in conjunction with the November 2023 rebrand.

Yasmin Allen was appointed chairman of the board in November 2021.

Tiimely closed a Series D funding round in December 2022, raising A$54 million. The raise was led by Regal Funds Management and is made up of A$30 million raised in February, with a further A$24 million raised from existing investors Bendigo & Adelaide Bank and IAG Firemark Ventures .

Up announced early access for its first home loan product, Up Home, in July 2022. The Up Home offering is built on Tiimely technology and funded by Bendigo and Adelaide Bank.

Qantas Money Home Loans launched in early February 2023, and is a white-label mortgage product of Tiimely and funded by Bendigo and Adelaide Bank.

Tiimely was approved as an unrestricted accredited data recipient by the Australian Competition & Consumer Commission under the Consumer Data Right in March 2023.

NRMA launched their new market product, NRMA Home Loans, in October 2023, a white-label mortgage product of Tiimely and funded by Bendigo and Adelaide Bank.

The company announced the rebrand of its corporate and enterprise business from Tic:Toc to Tiimely in November 2023, and rebranded their retail brand, Tic:Toc Home Loans to Tiimely Home.

Tiimely achieved accreditation as a certified B Corporation (certification) in November 2023.
