= Demetrio Stratos =

Greek musician and lyricist (1945–1979)

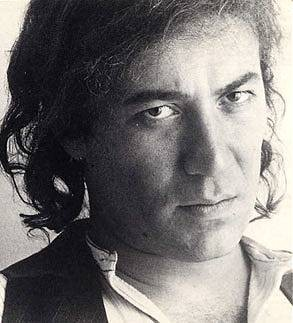

Background information
- Also known as: Demetrio Stratos
- Born: Efstratíos Dimitríou; Ευστράτιος Δημητρίου; 22 April 1945; Alexandria, Kingdom of Egypt
- Died: 13 June 1979 (aged 34) New York City, U.S.
- Genres: Progressive rock, art rock, experimental, world
- Occupations: Vocalist, songwriter, multi-instrumentalist, music researcher
- Instruments: Vocals, piano, organ, keyboards, accordion, steel drums
- Years active: 1963–1979
- Labels: Ricordi, Numero Uno, Cramps, Ascolto
- Website: demetriostratos.it

Efstratios Dimitriou (Greek: Ευστράτιος Δημητρίου; 22 April 1945 – 13 June 1979), known professionally as Demetrio Stratos, was a Greek-Italian vocalist, songwriter, multi-instrumentalist and music researcher, best known as the co-founder, frontman and lead singer of the Italian progressive rock band Area – International POPular Group.

Born and raised in Alexandria, Egypt, of Greek parents, he studied piano and accordion at the "National Conservatoire". In 1957 he was sent to Nicosia, Cyprus, and, at the age of 17, moved to Milan, Italy, to attend the Politecnico di Milano University at the Architecture Faculty, where he formed his first musical group. In 1967, Demetrio Stratos joined the Italian beat band I Ribelli, and in 1972, founded Area.

Stratos recorded many records, and toured festivals in Italy, France, Portugal, Switzerland, Netherlands, Cuba, and the United States with Area, as well as a solo artist and in collaboration with other artists. He worked with Mogol, Lucio Battisti, Gianni Sassi, Gianni Emilio Simonetti, Juan Hidalgo, Walter Marchetti, John Cage, Tran Quang Hai, Merce Cunningham, Jasper Johns, Andy Warhol, Grete Sultan, Paul Zukofsky, Nanni Balestrini, Claude Royet-Journoud, and Antonio Porta.

Stratos studied ethnomusicology, vocal extensions, Asian music chant, compared musicology, the problem of ethnic vocality, psychoanalysis, the relationship between spoken language and the psyche, the limits of the spoken language. He was able to reach 7,000 Hz, and to perform diplophony, triplophony, and also quadrophony. Daniel Charles has described him as the person who decimated monody by the demultiplication of the acoustic spectrum. His vocal abilities were explored and documented.

Stratos died in New York City Memorial Hospital on 13 June 1979 at the age of 34. His self-proclaimed mission was to free vocal expression from what he considered to be the slavery of language and classical lyrical melody. He considered the exploration of vocal potential as a tool of psychological and political liberation. His studies and recognition of the voice as musical instrument carried this ethos to the edge of human vocal ability. His work is considered by many critics and vocalists as important in the progression of experimental and novel vocal techniques.

== Biography ==
=== The early years, 1945–1971 ===
Demetrio Stratos was born as Efstratios Demetriou in Alexandria, Egypt, on 22 April 1945 to Greek parents Janis Demetriou and Athanassia Archondoyorghi. He spent his first 13 years in Alexandria where he studied piano and accordion at the prestigious Conservatoire National d'Athènes ("National Conservatoire of Athens"), and studied English at the British Boys School. As he later said, the fact that he was born in Alexandria made him feel like a special and privileged "porter" in an international hotel, destined to live the experience of peoples' passages and to assist in the true "traffic" of culture in the Mediterranean area, so full of various ethnic groups and intense musical practices. His family was of Greek Orthodox religion, so during his infancy he listened to religious Byzantine songs, traditional Arabic music and then the early beginnings of rock and roll. All of those sounds strongly influenced him for the rest of his life. In 1957, because of the political events that upset Egypt, he was sent to the Catholic College of the Holy Land in Nicosia, Cyprus where, two years later, his family joined him.

In 1962, he and his family moved to Milan, Italy where he attended the Politecnico di Milano University at the Architecture Faculty. In 1963 he formed his first musical group and performed live at the "Casa dello studente" ("Student's House") Festival in Milan, then in some of the local pubs such as the Santa Tecla and the Intra's al Corso. Fortuitously, the original singer of the group was unable to sing one night due to a minor car accident, so Stratos stepped in to replace him, which began his venture into singing. His repertoire at that time was a mixture of soul, blues and rhythm and blues. In this period, Stratos also worked in many recording studios in Milan, playing keyboards.

In 1967, he joined the Italian beat band I Ribelli ("The Rebels") as the keyboard player. With I Ribelli, he recorded many hit singles like "Chi mi aiuterà", "Oh Darling!" and "Pugni chiusi", a song that became a symbol of the Italian 1960s, and Stratos' fame rapidly grew in Italy. In 1969, the band released their self-titled studio album, I Ribelli.

In 1970, he left I Ribelli and formed a musical group with some English musicians including the drummer Jan Broad, and started to dedicate himself to his work on music and voice research, experimenting with vocal phenomena. His interest in this research started when he observed his daughter, Anastassia (who was born in 1970), during her "babbling" phase, when a child is not yet able to speak correctly. Stratos noticed by watching his daughter that a child initially "plays" and "experiments" with her or his own voice, but then the richness of the vocal sound gets lost in the acquisition of verbal language. "The child loses the sound in order to organize the words". This observation by Stratos was fundamental for his poetry. This language-voice connection and his experimentation with it was the hallmark of his entire artistic career.

In 1971, he recorded the solo single "Daddy's dream" which was published by Numero Uno, a record company owned by Mogol and Lucio Battisti. His involvement with commercial music definitively ended after this one commercial recording.

=== Area, 1972–1978 ===
In 1972, Demetrio Stratos and drummer Giulio Capiozzo founded Area, an Italian progressive rock, jazz fusion band. The original line-up included Eddie Busnello (saxophone), Patrick Djivas (bass), Leandro Gaetano (piano) and Johnny Lambizzi (lead guitar). Soon after, Busnello and Djivas left the group, and Patrizio Fariselli and Paolo Tofani joined the group. Djivas joined Premiata Forneria Marconi (PFM), and he was replaced by Ares Tavolazzi. Stratos recorded many records with Area, as well as in collaboration with Gianni Sassi, the owner of Cramps Records, on solo artist albums.

In 1973, Stratos took part in the eighth Biennale de Paris, and Area released their first studio album, Arbeit macht frei ("Work Brings Freedom"), taken from the inscription that was on the gate at the entrance of Auschwitz Nazi concentration camp.

In 1974, Area toured festivals in France, Portugal, and Switzerland. Stratos gradually became more and more deeply involved in the mysterious world of vocal sounds, resuming and widening his immense work on the importance of the voice in the Asian and Middle Eastern civilizations. In Milan, he worked together with Gianni Emilio Simonetti, Juan Hidalgo, and Walter Marchetti, founders of the group Zaj (an experimental music and performance art group formed in 1959), in the context of the Fluxus experience (an international network of artists, composers and designers noted for blending different artistic media and disciplines), and he then became involved with John Cage's music when he recorded Cage's "Sixty-Two Mesostics Re Merce Cunningham" in a version for a solo voice and microphone, subsequently performed at numerous festivals in front of large audiences mainly consisting of young people. At the festival of the proletarian youth in Lambro Park, Milan, Stratos introduced the Mesostics in front of 15,000 people. Later, this piece was partially included in the recordings dedicated to the music of Cage, Nova Musicha N. 1: John Cage (CRSLP 6101), which were published by Cramps Records and inaugurated the "Nova Musicha" series. In the meantime, Area recorded and released their second studio album, Caution Radiation Area.

In 1975, Stratos was involved with compared musicology and studied the problems of ethnic vocality, the vocal methods in East Asian music, and—in particular—the overtone singing techniques. He gradually became more and more deeply involved in the mysterious world of vocal sounds, widening his immense work on the importance of the voice in the Asian and Middle Eastern civilizations. Also in 1975, Area released their third studio album, Crac!.

In 1976, Stratos released his first studio album as a solo artist, Metrodora, which was the result of his vocal studies and research. Its title and the single lyric that was included were inspired by Metrodora, a Byzantine woman physician of the 6th century. In Paris, Stratos contacted Emile Leipp, the director of the Laboratory of Acoustics at the Paris VI University (Faculty of Sciences). Area released their fifth studio album, Maledetti (Maudits), and the band went on tour, giving exhibitions at some festivals in France and Portugal. Together with Patrizio Fariselli (prepared piano), Paolo Tofani (guitar and synthesizer), Paul Lytton (percussion), and Steve Lacy (sax soprano), he performed a concert in the "Aula Magna" at the University of Milan. The live recording of that performance, Event '76, was published by Cramps Records in 1979.

In this period, Stratos was involved in the study of psychoanalysis and was researching the relationship between spoken language and the psyche. Stratos spoke at several seminars at the Istituto di Glottologia e Fonetica ("Institute of Glottology and Phonetics") at the University of Padua, in Italy, formulating his own and true "pedagogy of the voice". In Padua, he worked together with Ferrero and Lucio Croatto from the Centro Medico di Foniatria ("Medical Centre of Phoniatrics"), on research related to language and vocal techniques. Stratos underlined the link between language and the psyche, and he highlighted the connection between them with the sounds made by his own vocal cords, which he considered to be a musical instrument.

In 1977, his vocal abilities were explored and documented by Professor Franco Ferrero at the University of Padua, a study that produced two scientific publications. He also found the time to do some live performances at the "Arsenale" Theater and at the Marconi's Gallery in Milan.

Albert Hera asked Tran Quang Hai in an interview, "What do you think about Demetrio Stratos?" Tran Quang Hai answered:

He learned from me in 1977, in France. He came to me with a manager who told me that the Master Demetrio Stratos wanted to learn my singer's techniques. He stayed with me for two hours and he learned everything. Then, he returned to Italy and used the exercises learned for its personal searches.

— Tran Quang Hai to Albert Hera (in Italian)

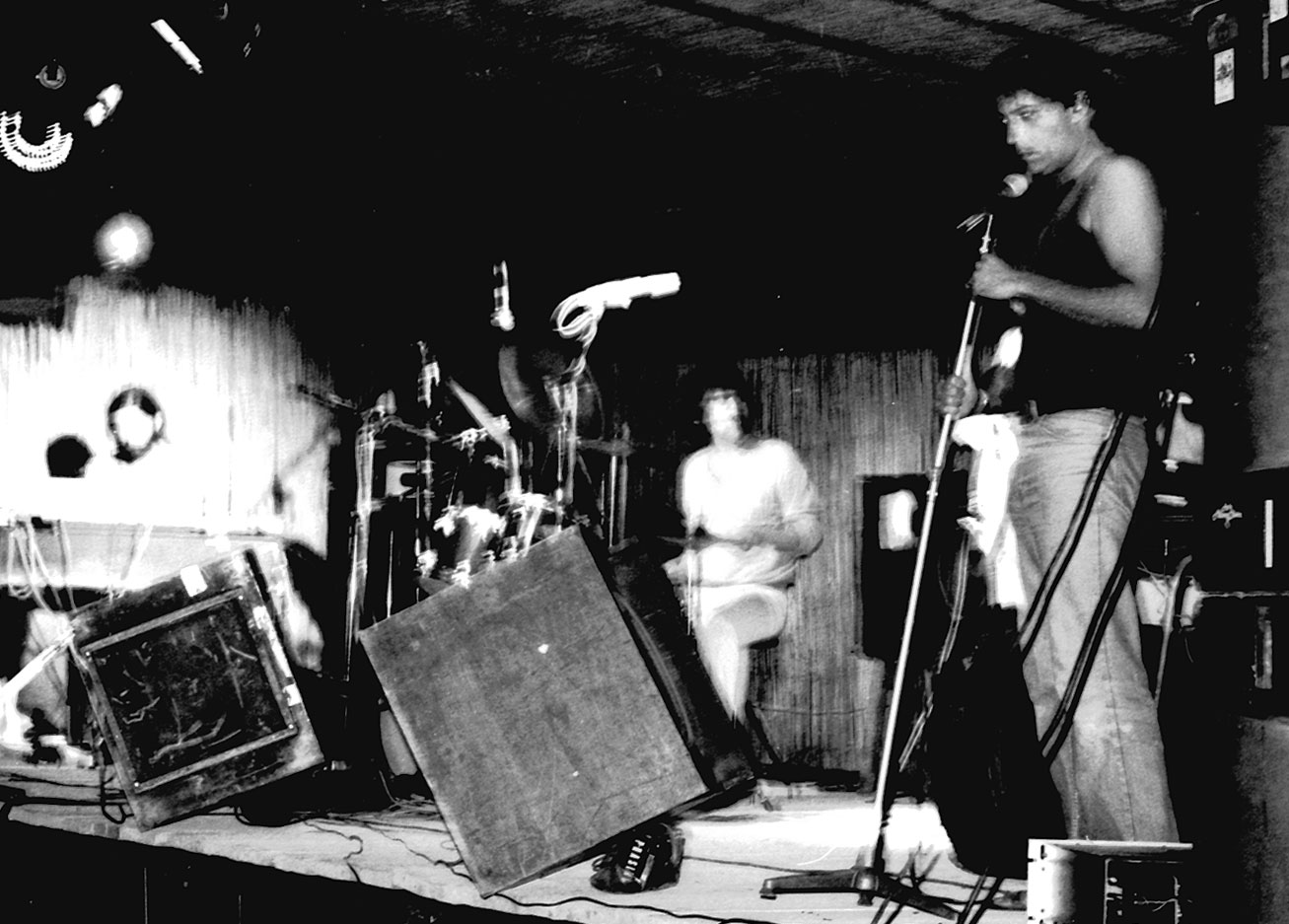
Area live in Castelmassa (Rovigo), Italy, August 1978

In 1978, Area left Cramps Records and moved to Ascolto, a record label owned by CGD. For Ascolto, they released their sixth studio album, 1978 Gli dei se ne vanno, gli arrabbiati restano!, the last one that included Demetrio Stratos. In the meantime, Stratos continued with Cramps and Gianni Sassi as a solo artist, releasing Cantare la Voce. In February, representing Greece, he did a concert at the Musée d'Art Moderne de la Ville de Paris, organized by the Atelier de Création Radiophonique for the X Internationals Biennale of Young Artists, entitled "Musics at an Exhibition" created by Daniel Caux. Then, he performed live as a solo artist at the Pre-Art Gallery of Milan and went on tour in Portugal with Area. His international fame grew when, at the invitation of John Cage, he took part in concerts given at the Roundabout Theatre in New York City on 18 and 19 March. This was the time of "Event" a show by Merce Cunningham, and the Dance Company, under the artistic direction of Jasper Johns, with Cage's musical direction and contribution, and also featuring scenography and costume designs by Robert Rauschenberg, Mark Lancaster, and Andy Warhol. In this, Stratos produced an astonishing array of sounds and sound effects using only his voice.

On 2 June, Stratos was in Bologna for the second International Week of the Performance. In Amsterdam, on 15 June, Stratos participated in "Sounday" by John Cage, an uninterrupted performance of approximately ten hours, from 7:00 am to 5:00 pm, which was organized at the Centrum Bellevue by Dutch Radio KRO Radio Hilversum IV. In Amsterdam, Stratos held a seminar with a live performance at the Stedelijk Museum. On 26, 27, and 28 June, Stratos participated at the Cage's show "Il Treno di John Cage – Alla ricerca del silenzio perduto" ("John Cage's Train – In search for (or Raiders of) the lost silence")", three musical rides on a prepared train, stuffed with microphones, monitors, 210 tape records, amplifiers and random sounds, all directed by Cage himself with the assistance of Walter Marchetti and Juan Hidalgo. On 4 July, he was on stage with Grete Sultan and Paul Zukofsky for a John Cage concert at the Margherita theatre in Genoa.

From 28 July to 5 August, Area participated at the World Festival of Youth and Students (for Anti-Imperialist Solidarity, Peace and Friendship) in Havana, Cuba. Stratos was invited by the local Ministry of Culture to meet the delegation of Mongolian musicians and to participate in discussion on vocal methods in East Asian music. Upon returning from Cuba, Stratos recorded a sound poem, O Tzitziras o Mitziras, for the historical-critical anthology Futura, released by Cramps Records, in which he explored the onomatopoeic force of the song of the cicadas suggested by a Greek tongue-twister. In September, he did a live performance at the Elfo theatre in Milan, which was featured in "Settimana John Cage" ("John Cage Week") at the Opéra Louis Jouvet in Paris. He was invited by John Cage to teach a course related to the possibilities of the human voice for the Center for Experimental Music at University of San Diego in California.

=== Death ===
In January 1979, Stratos recorded Le Milleuna, a one-hour interpretation with lyrics written by Nanni Balestrini, with the mimic interpretation and action performed by Valeria Magli. In February, he was in Paris to perform the Antonin Artaud character in a theatrical review organized by France Culture. In the same month, from the 8th to the 11th, he was at the Alberico theatre in Rome for a series of recitals. Stratos planned the show "Rock' n' roll Exhibition" with Paolo Tofani and Mauro Pagani in order to bring back to the light the great musicians of the '50s rock and roll years. A live test session with an audience at the "Porta Romana" theatre in Milan had been recorded, and it was later released on LP in the following June. Also with France Culture, in the series "Poésie Ininterrompue" ("Uninterrupted Poetry") directed by Claude Royet-Journoud, Stratos had a long interview with Daniel Charles, where he performed many vocal sequences and provided explanations. Stratos left Area in order to dedicate himself exclusively to vocal research, experimentation, and the pursuit of his solo career. At the Music Conservatory "G. Verdi" of Milan, he held a course of Semiotics of Contemporary Music on the voice. The series of lessons continued until March. On Friday 30 March, Stratos held his last concert, performing solo, at the "Teatrino di Villa Reale" ("little" Theater of the Royal Villa) in Monza.

In April, Demetrio Stratos was diagnosed with a severe case of aplastic anemia. On 2 April, he was hospitalized at the Milan Polyclinic, but his condition deteriorated rapidly and he was transferred to New York City Memorial Hospital for treatment. Meanwhile, in Italy, his friends organized a concert to pay for his medical expenses. Many musicians accepted the invitation to perform, and the concert was planned for 14 June 1979. It was to become Demetrio Stratos' memorial concert, where over a hundred musicians played in front of an audience of 60,000 at the Arena of Milan, the first great and spontaneous reunion of youth in Italy. He died in New York City Memorial Hospital on 13 June 1979 at the age of thirty–four, while waiting for a bone marrow transplant (the official cause of death was a myocardial infarction, more commonly known as heart attack).

His death cut short a collaboration with poet Antonio Porta, another Novissimo, on a project set to the music of Stratos' voice upsetting not only the avant-garde and experimental musicians who saw Stratos as one of their most important and representative members, but the entire show business community. The news spread in all directions, including media that was not so aware of alternative music. At the time of his death, rumors circulated that his illness was caused by his secret and dangerous vocal practices. People wanted to believe that Demetrio Stratos had died due to daring too much and wandering outside the limits of human possibilities, as if he was a modern Icarus, punished for flying too close to the Sun.

Stratos' memorial, inscribed with the beginning of the Odyssey: "Musa, parlami di quell'uomo di multiforme ingegno" ("Tell me, Muse, of the man of many devices"), is at the Cemetery of Scipione Castello (44.82872785°N 9.961494°E), a little village that is a fraction of Salsomaggiore Terme, a town in northern Italy, which is located in the province of Parma, in the Emilia-Romagna region. Every year since 2000, Scipione Castello organizes a musical festival in memory of Demetrio Stratos.

== Legacy ==
 to have haD
     the idEa
       his Music
    would nEver
          sTop
       the Range
       of hIs
          vOice
would have
   no limitS
        nexT
         foR him
      to leArn was
        in Tibet
after that Out
into vocal Space

— John Cage, Mesostic for Demetrio Stratos (1991)

Area, Demetrio Stratos, Patrizio Fariselli, and Paolo Tofani were included in the Nurse with Wound list, a list of musicians and bands that accompanied the first album by Nurse with Wound, entitled Chance Meeting on a Dissecting Table of a Sewing Machine and an Umbrella and released in 1979. Shortly after his death Italian progressive rock band Premiata Forneria Marconi dedicated to Demetrio Stratos "Maestro della voce" ("Master of the Voice"), a song that is featured on their 1980 album Suonare suonare. The auditorium of Radio Popolare, a Milan-based radio network, was entitled to Demetrio Stratos. The Rassegna di Musica Diversa – Omaggio a Demetrio Stratos ("Review of Different Music – Homage to Demetrio Stratos") is a review that was born in 1996 and every year promotes many Italian emerging musical groups and ideas, especially those who are more innovative. This homage review takes place in Alberone di Cento, a city in northern Italy, that is located in the province of Ferrara, in the Emilia-Romagna region.

In 2002, the Italian progressive rock band Picchio dal Pozzo discovered the tape recordings made in 1979 by the band with Stratos performing at the IPPAI Theatre (Institute for Youth's Protection and Assistance) in Genoa, Italy. Stratos' performances were featured on Picchio dal Pozzo's 2004 album, Pic_nic @ Valdapozzo, whose songs are built around Stratos' voice. The effect is particularly striking on the song "Epitaffio", in which Stratos creates a sweet melody with his "Flautofonie" technique, while a subtle beat, harmony and night sounds are provided very gently as not to shadow the voice.

The "Demetrio Stratos" International Prize for experimental music, established in 2005 and promoted by his wife Daniela Ronconi Demetriou, Area's member Patrizio Fariselli, Claudio Chianura, Walter Prati and Gerd Rische, awards emerging musicians and new projects for music experimentation, and career achievements in experimental music. The award for the emerging artist best project has been assigned to Romina Daniele in 2005. The Career Awards have been received by Diamanda Galás in 2005, Meredith Monk in 2007, Fred Frith in 2008, Fátima Miranda in 2009, and Joan La Barbara in 2011.

La voce Stratos ("The Voice Stratos") is a book and a documentary on the life and career of Demetrio Stratos released in 2009 and directed by Luciano D'Onofrio and Monica Affatato, and with the collaboration of Stratos' wife Daniela Ronconi Demetriou. It includes over thirty interviews with Stratos' collaborators, musicians, artists and phonetics researchers, as well as photos, videos, and previously unseen footage. The second edition of Suonare la voce: tributo a Demetrio Stratos ("Playing the Voice: Tribute to Demetrio Stratos") was held in Genoa in the same year. The two days of seminars and concerts culminated with a performance by Spanish artist Fátima Miranda.

On 25 August 2009 in Siena, the remaining Area members, Patrizio Fariselli, Ares Tavolazzi, and Paolo Tofani together with Capiozzo's son, Christian on drums, and Mauro Pagani on vocals and violin reunited for the first time in over a decade during the ninth edition of the festival La Città Aromatica ("The Aromaric City"), dedicated to Demetrio Stratos thirty years after his death. On 29 and 30 January 2010, there was another tribute to Stratos and another reunion of Area with UT Gandhi (Umberto Trombetta) on drums. They played at the San Lazzaro di Savena (Bologna) theatre as part of StratosFerico: Omaggio a Demetrio Stratos ("StratosPheric: Tribute to Demetrio Stratos").

Recently, the Italian director Gabriele Salvatores announced his intention to produce a movie exploring Italian music and politics through the life of Stratos.

== Phonetics research studies ==
Vocal gimmicks aside, Stratos' mission was to free vocal expression from the slavery of language and pretty melodies. From the observation of his daughter Anastassia, he concluded that humans have enormous expressive potential that is progressively reduced to just a few socially appropriate functions during verbal development, such as language and harmonic singing. He considered the exploration of vocal potential as a tool of psychological and political liberation. He, literally, wanted individuals and social groups to find their own voice.

If a new vocality can exist, it must be lived by all, and not singularly: an attempt to get freed by the condition of listener and spectator to which the culture and politics have accustomed us. This work does not be assumed as a passively listening, but as "a game in which life is at risk".

— Demetrio Stratos from Metrodora (in Italian)

Besides the official Area discography, for which Stratos is remembered, it is important to remember his solo works, a massive set of productions full of experimentation and vocal research. His study of the voice used as a musical instrument carried him to reach for the limits of human capabilities. Stratos was able to reach 7,000 Hz, when a tenor normally reaches 523 Hz and a woman soprano 1,046 Hz (C6). He would hold notes for long periods of time, modulate them vibrato-like, and leap and dive from low to high and back again, with pinpoint accuracy. Using various overtone singing and other extended techniques, he was able to perform diplophony, triplophony, and also quadrophony, the ability to produce two, three, and even four sounds simultaneously (multiphonic) using only the human voice as the musical instrument. In collaboration with the CNR of Padua, he has released many studies in ethnomusicology, vocal extensions and Asian music chant.

Looking at what I have found during the emission, the vocal folds did not vibrate. The frequency (for a human voice) was very high (vocal folds do not succeed to exceed the frequencies of 1,000–1,200 Hz). In spite of that Demetrio obtained not one, but two not harmonic hisses, one that descended from 6,000 Hz, and the other that climbed from 3,000 Hz. Therefore, it could not be supposed that one hiss was the next harmonic of the other. I observed also the emission of three hisses simultaneously

— Professor Franco Ferrero (in Italian)

The research of Stratos brings many suggestions of unexplored fields of research that are still to be studied such as the pre-eminence of the meaning over the meant, and the ritual value of the voice. His research into the field of phonetics (Articulatory phonetics, Acoustic phonetics, and Auditory phonetics), and experimental poetry led to him freeing his voice of every naturalistic restraint, restoring its depth and dimension. The result of this can be heard in the two recordings of his compositions Metrodora and Cantare la Voce where what sounds like an instrument is in fact his voice.

(human) Voice in today's music is a transmission channel that does not transmit anything. The western vocal hypertrophy has rendered almost insensitive the modern singer to the various aspects of the vocality, isolating him in the fencing of determined linguistic's structures

— Demetrio Stratos from Metrodora (in Italian)

=== The pre-eminence of the signifier over the signified ===
The pre-eminence of the signifier over the signified is an issue of which linguistics and pragmatics are fond of, and has brought to the turning point in both semantics and semiotics. The value of language is not to be researched in the connections among the signs or in the relation between the signifier (signifiant) and the signified (signifié), but in the usage of the language in the context. For example, there is a metacommunicative meaning in a change in pitch, volume, timbre, or tone of the sound produced by the voice that can nullify the semantic value of a sentence (the words).

Stratos grasped the semantic increase produced by the voice. It is not only in function of the meanings but it is its own primal mode of body expression. The voice has a communicative meaning by itself which deserves to be listened to regardless of the meanings it may convey. The signifier "voice" becomes semiogenetic, that is producer of new signification when verifying it in its bare essence, in its "phoné". The "magic" sound of voice is independent from meanings, so Stratos produces sounds without codified meanings, which yet create new possible worlds.

As the petrified Oread Echo, his research for this lost voice explores the human cry, the breath, the noise. It intends to go back to the corporeal reality, to the instinctive materiality, to the animal Dionysian base, suppressed by a codified objectiveness. The insistence on the "significant voice" takes value away from the subjective production of the signified. Stratos carries to a dissolving of "the I" by a creatively repetitive modulation in advantage of an intersubjective union of the sources of life.

The nomadic voice represents the liberation, it aspires to the body vocalization subtracted to the fixed inflections of the bel canto. In "Mirologhi I", "Mirologhi II" and "Criptomelodie Infantili" the voice tends to be declined plurally, it whispers, it moans, it imitates, it becomes diplophonia and triplophonia. It is a polyphonic vocalism without a subject, androgynous, where both genders, masculine and feminine, coexist.

Stratos sings the voice, mere appearance, pharmakon, poisonous, and curative, without anything else except the voice, a pure ludic act, only voice as voice itself. "By this way the subversive sovereignty of the voice as an event, pharmakon communication challenge leaves the subject somewhere between unconditioned enjoyment and consumption."

The praise of the voice signifier supports an epistemology of the perception, it states "the error of Descartes" who reduced reason to conceptual word. It's in line with the "Praktognosia" (practical knowledge) of Maurice Merleau-Ponty, which sets the starting pointing the sensible perceptions of our bodies.

=== The ritual value of the voice ===
Stratos refers to the aulos, the double-reeded flute used during the old rites in the ancient Greece; it produces two sounds and it is able to keep persons in a state of trance. In his "Flautofonie ed Altro", a track that it is featured on his 1978 album, Cantare la voce, there are two not harmonic voices that cause to the listener a state of trance, similar to the trance during the religious rites, and a sense of estrange. So, the Stratos' voice-music is a sort of lay rite that produces to the listeners the ability to reach their primordial origin.

"The Stratos' flute-voice plays a circular theme, a modal inspiration that brings us filler to an experience of communion, ritual interaction and sacrifices. That repetition suggests something of hypnotic that should be propitious to the trance state. Stratos seems to wish a participated, spontaneous and also generous listening. Through these, always different, repetitions, he aimed to abolish, to dissolute, to dissolve the "ego", as the basic element for the sacrifice. In this dissolution of the identity we (the group of listeners) are in communion with gods (divinities), Earth and life." — Janete El Haouli (translated from Spanish to Italian to English)

In the years of the desecration and secularization of the Christianity, Stratos proposed a new lay sacredness, in the name of the ancient Greeks, a return to the true rituality. The binomial voice-music had forgotten that rituality because in today's world it is only used to propose human's thoughts, ideas, and ideologies rather than the sacred experiences of the intimate communion between humans and the nature that surrounds us.

The search of the triplophonies and quadriphonies is used by Tibetan's monks and some knights of Mongolia. "It is a ritual use of the voice", wrote Stratos, and this purpose is maintained in his works. There are four ritual elements: the repetition, the escape from the ordinary, the loss of the ego, and the communitarian dimension. Perhaps, reading Gilles Deleuze, Stratos had been convinced that the repetition was not the ill-famed co-action to repeat the obsessive neurosis, but it should become a technique to escape from the ordinary, from the temporary flux, to access to another order of truth. Therefore, the trance with the abolition of the ego and the known world increased the horizon on other worlds. The result was a collective scene, an estranging and mystic performance at the same time.

In Stratos' works, the standard-bearer of the lay rituals can be found in the rock mega-concerts, where the audience is not exhausted by the spectacular of the mimetic model of the super star, but in the nearly to religious fruition of the voice-music that allows to feel us in the scene the ice cold shiver chilling of our belongings to life.

Because of his great ability, his acquired techniques and his studies with the CNR, he was able to produce results that are still unattainable by others. Daniel Charles has described him as the person who decimated monody by the demultiplication of the acoustic spectrum. He achieved a diplophony which is triplophonic, even quadraphonic. His vocalization became micro orchestrations (voice instrument) without any technological amplification or manipulation. He elevated rock singing to new heights with his vocal gymnastics.

== Discography ==
Demetrio Stratos has released several studio albums and singles as a solo artist, and is featured on several albums recorded by other artists.

=== Albums ===
| Year | Album | Additional information |
|---|---|---|
| 1968 | I Ribelli | Album by I Ribelli. |
| 1972 | Radius | Album by Alberto Radius. Demetrio Stratos features on track A2. "To the Moon I'm Going" – 7:28. |
| 1974 | Nova Musicha N. 1 | Album by John Cage. Demetrio Stratos features on track B3. "Demetrio Stratos – Sixty–Two Mesostics Re Merce Cunningham (Frammenti)" – 9:00. Originally released in vinyl LP format and published in Italy by Cramps, CRSLP 6101; re–released in 2007 in CD Sized Album Replica, Gatefold, Limited Edition format and published in Japan by Strange Days, POCE–1205. |
| 1976 | Metrodora | Originally released in vinyl LP format and published in Italy by Cramps, CRSLP 6205; re-released in 2007 in CD Sized Album Replica, Limited Edition format and published in Japan by Strange Days, POCE-1197. Track listing Side one: 1. "Segmenti Uno" – 3:36; 2. "Segmenti Due" – 4:04; 3. "Segmenti Tre" – 4:01; 4. "Segmenti Quattro" – 4:31; Side two: 1. "Mirologhi 1 (Lamento d'Epiro)" – 4:23; 2. "Metrodora" – 8:55; 3. "Mirologhi 2 (Lamento d'Epiro)" – 4:10 |
| 1976 | Cantata Rossa per Taal al Zaatar | Album by Gaetano Liguori, Giulio Stocchi and Demetrio Stratos, featuring Concetta Busacca, Pasquale Liguori and Roberto Del Piano. Originally released in vinyl LP format. |
| 1978 | Futura: Poesia Sonora | Antologia storico critica della poesia sonora ("Critical-historical anthology of sound poetry"). Sound poems, many of them performed by their authors. Edited by Arrigo Lora-Totino; introduction by Renato Barilli. Demetrio Stratos features on disc 7, track A2. "O Tzitziras o Mitziras" – 4:01 Originally released in vinyl LP format and published in Italy by Cramps, 5204-001; re–released in 1989 in CD format and published in Italy by Cramps, CRSCD 091-095. |
| 1978 | Cantare la voce | Originally released in vinyl LP format and published in Italy by Cramps, 520.6119. Track listing Side one: 1. "Investigazioni (Diplofonie e Triplofonie)" – 14:41; 2. "Passaggi 1,2" – 5:16; Side two: 1. "Criptomelodie Infantili" – 6:23; 2. "Flautofonie ed Altro" – 6:17; 3. "Le Sirene" – 6:19 |
| 1978 | Mauro Pagani | Ascolto.: "L'albero di canto"; "L'albero di canto II" |
| 1979 | Le Milleuna | Text written by Nanni Balestrini. Originally released in vinyl LP format and published in Italy by Cramps, 7243 8 57442 2 8; re-released in 1990 in CD format and published in Italy by Cramps, CRSCD 034; re-released in 2007 in CD Sized Album Replica, Limited Edition format and published in Japan by Strange Days, POCE-1170. Track listing: 1. "Le Milleuna" – 63:13 |
| 1979 | Carnascialia | Polygram.: 1. "Canzone numero uno (c'è chi batte i denti, chi prende il ritmo e ci balla sopra)" (Pasquale Minieri, Piero Brega); 2. "Fiocchi di neve e bruscolini" (Antonio Vivaldi, Demetrio Stratos); 3. "Almeisan" (Minieri); 4. "Kaitain (22 ottobre 1962)" (Vivaldi, Minieri, Stratos, Maurizio Giammarco); 5. "Cruzeiro Do' Sul" (Giammarco); 6. "Gamela" (Minieri, Brega) |

=== Compilations and lives ===
| Year | Album | Additional information |
|---|---|---|
| 1979 | Rock'n roll exhibition | Live in 1978 with Paolo Tofani, Mauro Pagani, Walter Calloni, Stefano Cerri and Paolo Donnarumma. Cramps. Track listing Side one: 1. "Mean Woman Blues" – 4:27; 2. "Hound Dog" – 3:55; 3. "Blueberry Hill / I Can't Stop Loving You" – 4:50; 4. "Long Tall Sally" – 3:35; Side two: 1. "Boom Boom" – 10:00; 2. "Barefootin'" – 5:32; 3. "25 Miles From Nowhere" – 11:30 |
| 1980 | Recitarcantando | Live album recorded in Cremona, Italy on 21 September 1978, with Demetrio Stratos on vocals and Lucio Fabbri on violin Originally released in vinyl LP format and published in Italy by Cramps, 520.6501; re-released in 2007 in CD Sized Album Replica, Gatefold, Limited Edition format and published in Japan by Strange Days, POCE-1171. Track listing Side one: 1. "Flautofonie ed altro" – 4:45; 2. "Passaggi" – 2:05; 3. "Cometa Rossa" – 9:19; 4. "Le sirene" – 5:02; Side two: 1. "Flautofonie ed altro" – 8:10; 2. "Investigazioni (diplofonie triplofonie)" – 7:05; 3. "Mirologhi 1" – 5:30; 4. "Investigazioni" – 1:35 |
| 1995 | Concerto all'Elfo | Live performance (of Cantare la voce), originally released in CD format and published in Italy by Cramps, 300 037-2; re-released in 2007 in CD Sized Album Replica, Limited Edition format, and published in 2007 in Japan by Strange Days, POCE-1172. |
| 1999 | La Voce-Musica | |
| 2004 | Stratosfera | 5-CD box set containing all Stratos' solo recordings: Metrodora, Cantare la Voce, Recitaracantando (with Lucio Fabbri), Le Milleuna, and Concerto all'Elfo. Akarma R 624296 |

=== Singles ===
| Year | Single | Additional information |
|---|---|---|
| 1966 | "Come Adriano / Enchinza Bubu" | Single by I Ribelli. |
| 1966 | "Per Una Lira / Ehi... Voi!" | Single by I Ribelli. Two issues. |
| 1967 | "Chi Mi Aiuterà / Un Giorno Se Ne Va" | Single by I Ribelli. |
| 1967 | "La Follia / Pugni Chiusi" | Single by I Ribelli. |
| 1969 | "Goodbye / Josephine" | Single by I Ribelli. |
| 1969 | "Obladì Obladà / Lei m'ama" | Single by I Ribelli. |
| 1969 | "Oh Darling / Il vento non sa leggere" | Single by I Ribelli. |
| 1972 | "Daddy's dream / Since you've been gone" | 7" vinyl published in Italy by Numero Uno, ZN 50142. |
| 1978 | O Tzitziras o Mitziras | Cramps Records. |

=== Videos ===
| Year | Title | Additional information |
|---|---|---|
| 2006 | Suonare la voce | Originally released in VHS and DVD Video formats and published in the European Union by Cramps, 7243 4 91955 3 0 Track listing: 1. "Investigazioni (diplofonie e trifonie)" 2. "Passaggi 1, 2"; 3. "Criptomelodie infantili" 4. "Flautonie ed altro" 5. "Le sirene" 6. "Sixty two Mesostics Re Merce Cunningham"; 7. "Cometa rossa" 8. "Luglio, agosto, settembre (nero)" 9. "Mean Woman Blues"; 10. "Hound Dog"; 11. "Long Tall Sally"; 12. "Metrodora" |
| 2009 | La voce Stratos | |

== See also ==
- Art rock
- Electronic music
- Italian progressive rock
- List of overtone musicians
- Tuvan throat singing
- World music
