= Conocchie =

Italian percussion instrument

The conocchie (Italian plural of conocchia—a distaff) is a percussion instrument used in the folk music of much of southern Italy. Technically, the instrument is a rattle and was originally crafted from a shepherd's staff or a distaff used in the craft of spinning. The staff has a permanently attached compartment on the top containing seed rattles. The instrument had ritual fertility significance. Today, such instruments come in many different shapes, all variations of the wooden staff and may be very ornately carved or crafted. It has been used commonly through history.
