= Biglietto Per L'Inferno =

- Origin: Lecco, Lombardia, Italy
- Genres: Progressive rock, hard rock, folk rock
- Years active: 1972–1975, 2007–present
- Labels: Trident, Mellow, AMS

Biglietto Per L'Inferno (Ticket To Hell in English) was a short-lived Italian progressive rock band active in the 1970s. The band had been formed in 1972 in Lecco before disbanding in 1975, only officially releasing one album in this period, but recorded a second one that was released in 1992. They officially reformed in 2007 as a folk group, and are still active today. They have released two albums in this period.

== Style ==
The band had more of a heavier edge to their music, with dark song titles and a serious atmosphere in their debut album Biglietto Per L'Inferno. In their reunion that came later on, this time with the name Biglietto Per L'Inferno Folk, the band would use many more woodwind and string instruments like flutes and violin.

== discography ==
- 1974 – Biglietto Per L'Inferno
- 1992 – Il Tempo Della Semina (Archival)
- 2005 – Live 1974 (Archival)
- 2009 – Tra L'Assurdo E La Ragione
- 2015 – Vivi, Lotta, Pensa

== Personnel ==
=== 1972–1975 ===
- Claudio Canali – Vocals, flute, saxhorn
- Marco Mainetti – Guitars
- Giuseppe Cossa – Piano, organ
- Giuseppe Banfi – Mini moog, organ
- Mauro Gnecchi – Drums
- Fausto Branchini – Bass

=== 2007–present ===
- Mariolina Sala – Vocals
- Claudio Canali – Vocals, flute
- Franco Giaffreda – Guitars (On Tra L'Assurdo E La Ragione)
- Pier Panzeri – Guitars (On Vivi, Lotta, Pensa)
- Carlo Redi – Violin
- Giuseppe Cossa – Keyboards
- Renata Tomasella – Woodwind
- Ranieri Fumagalli – Woodwind
- Mauro Gnecchi – Drums
- Enrico Fagnoni – Bass
