= Alphataurus =

- Origin: Milan, Italy
- Genres: Progressive rock
- Years active: 1970–present

Alphataurus is an Italian progressive rock band from the Milan area. Under the original lineup Alphataurus released only one album, Alphataurus, dated 1973, at the peak of the European progressive rock wave. The album was generally well received, and work on a second album started, but due to "a string of personal events" the band split up in 1973. The band is named after Aldebaran, the brightest star in the Taurus constellation.

Some tracks from a second album were finally released in 1992 on the record Dietro l'uragano. The first album had a second life with good sales later, and it is still selling today.

In the year 2009 Guido Wassermann and Pietro Pellegrini, two members of the original line up, decided that it was the time to return to the scene and reformed the band to record a new album, including both revised tunes from the second incomplete album and brand new tunes.

The original drummer Giorgio Santandrea also rejoined the band, and in November 2010 they officially had the reunion after over 30 years, playing at the Progvention 2010 in Milan. A live album from the reunion concert titles Live In Bloom was released in March 2012, but before the end of 2011 Giorgio Santandrea left the band, being replaced on drums by Alessandro “Pacho” Rossi. Their second studio album AttosecondO has been released in September 2012. In 2013 Fabio Rigamonti, bass player on both Live In Bloom and AttosecondO, left the band, and his role is taken by Marco Albanese; at the end of 2013 Pacho leaves the band as well, being replaced by Diego Mariani.

== 1973 line-up ==
- Pietro Pellegrini – keyboards
- Guido Wassermann – guitars and vocals
- Alfonso Oliva – bass
- Giorgio Santandrea – drums
- Michele Bavaro – vocals

== Latest line-up ==
- Pietro Pellegrini – keyboards and synth
- Guido Wassermann – guitar and vocal
- Andrea Guizzetti – piano, keyboard and vocal
- Giorgio Santandrea – drums and percussion
- Moreno Meroni – bass and vocal
- Claudio Falcone – lead vocal and hand percussion

== Discography ==
- 1973 – Alphataurus
- 1992 – Dietro l'uragano (compilation of unreleased demos / rehearsals)
- 2012 – Live in Bloom
- 2012 – AttosecondO
- 2014 – Prime Numbers (live DVD + rarities album)
- 2024 – 2084: Viaggio nel Nulla

== See also ==
- Italian progressive rock
