= Glossary of Italian music =

Italian music terminology consists of words and phrases used in the discussion of the music of Italy. Some Italian music terms are derived from the common Italian language. Others come from Neapolitan, Sicilian, Sardinian or other regional languages of Italy. The terms listed here describe a genre, song form, dance, instrument, style, quality of music, technique or other important aspect of Italian music.

== Dances ==
- alessandrina: A skipping dance from the area around Pavia
- alta danza: Early Spanish name for the saltarello
- argismo: A Sicilian term for the tarantella healing ritual, from argia, spider
- ariosa: A Carnival dance
- bal drabces: A Carnival dance
- ballarella: A variant name for the saltarello
- ballo dei Gobbi: A Carnival dance, dance of the hunchbacks
- ballo della Veneziana: A 2/2 dance of Venetian origin
- ballo di baraben: A ritual dance
- ballo di Mantova: A folk skipping dance
- ballu tundu: A traditional Sardinian folk dance
- ballu tzopu: A Sardinian folk dance
- balùn: A folk dance
- bas de tach: A Carnival dance
- crellareccia: A wedding dance in the sonata per la sposa of Alta Sabina
- danza dei coltelli: The dance of the knives, a knife dance derived from the tarantella
- forlana: Venetian term for the furlana
- friulana: Venetian term for the furlana
- furlana: A folk dance, from Campieli, favored in Venice
- furlane: Venetian term for the furlana
- frullana: Venetian term for the furlana
- gagliarda: Italian term for the galliarde
- gagliarde: Italian term for the galliarde
- giga: A skipping dance from the area around Pavia
- liscio: A ballroom dance
- monferrina: A 6/8 dance historically associated with Monferrato and the valleys of Fassa and Rendena
- muleta: A Carnival dance
- pas in amur: A Carnival dance
- passo brabante: An alternate term for the saltarello
- passu'e trese: A Sardinian folk dance
- perigurdino: A skipping dance from the area around Pavia
- piana: A skipping dance from the area around Pavia
- povera donna: A skipping dance from the area around Pavia, a Carnival ritual dance
- pizzica tarantata: An old form of the tarantella
- rezianka zagatina: A folk dance
- roncastalda: A folk skipping dance
- rose e fiori: A Carnival dance
- ruggero: A folk skipping dance
- russiano: A folk dance, said to originate in Russi
- sa seria: A Sardinian folk dance
- saltarella: A variant name for the saltarello
- saltarelle: A variant name for the saltarello
- saltarello: A widespread, leaping folk dance, originally in 3/4 time, and later in 3/8 and 6/8, derived from a court dance that evolved from the galliarde and was originally known in Spain as the alta danza, from saltare, to leap
- savatarelle: A variant name for the saltarello
- sos gocios: A Sardinian folk dance
- sos mutos: A Sardinian folk dance
- sposina: A skipping dance for brides from the area around Pavia
- stuzzichetto: A variant name for the saltarello
- su ballu: Popular Sardinian dances
- ta matianowa: A folk dance
- ta palacowa: A folk dance
- ta panawa: A folk dance
- tammorriata or tammuriata: A Campanian couple dance, accompanied by lyric songs called strambotti and tammorra tambourines
- tarantel: An alternate term for the tarantella
- tarantella: A couple dance in 6/8 time, intended to cure the supposedly poisonous bite of the tarantula
- tarantismo: An Apulian term for the tarantella healing ritual
- tarantolati: The tarantella ritual as it is practiced in Puglia
- tarentella: An alternate term for the tarantella
- tarentule: An alternate term for the tarantella
- ballo tondo: An alternate term for ballu tundu
- ballu torrau: A Sardinian folk dance
- trescone: A folk dance, one of Italy's oldest

== Instrumentation ==
- arpicelli: The Viggiano harp
- bena: A Sardinian clarinet
- bifora, also pifara: a Sicilian double reed instrument of the oboe family, related to the shawm and to the piffero
- bunkula: A cello.
- cannacione: A historical, rural form of lute
- cembalo: A hammered dulcimer
- chitarra: A guitar, also a voice in trallalero ensembles that imitates the guitar
- chitarra battente: A four- or five-steel stringed guitar, beating guitar
- chiterra: A Sardinian guitar
- ciaramella: A single-reed pipe, or oboe, also a bagpipe in Alta Sabina
- citira: A violin
- du' bottë: Abruzzese double bass diatonic accordion
- firlinfeu: A panflute
- fisarmonica: A chromatic piano accordion
- friscalettu: A Sicilian folk flute
- ghironda: A hurdy-gurdy most common in Emilia, Lombardy and Piedmont
- launeddas: A Sardinian clarinet, played using circular breathing
- lira: A three-stringed bowed fiddle, played on the knee, most common in Calabria
- mandola: A string instrument similar to both the guitar and mandolin
- mandolino: An Italian lute with eight or twelve strings
- müsa: A bagpipe
- organetto: A diatonic button accordion which accompanies the saltarello, and has largely replaced the bagpipe
- piffaro, piffero: A double-reed shawm
- piva: A kind of Lombard bagpipe
- putipù: A friction drum
- raganelle: A cog rattle
- ribeba: An alternate term, rebab, for the scacciapensieri
- scacciapensieri: A mouth harp found in the Alpine north and Sicily, care-chaser
- simbalo: A tambourine
- solitu: A Sardinian traditional shepherd's flute
- surdulina: A bagpipe from Basilicata
- tamburello: A small frame drum, used to accompany the tarantella, also a tambourine
- tamburini: A tambourine
- tammora: A large frame drum
- tamura: A large frame drum
- torototela: A bowed, one-string fiddle, most common in northeast Italy
- triangulu: A Sardinian triangle
- triccheballacche: A Neapolitan percussion instrument, built with mallets attached to a wooden frame, wooden clapper
- tromba degli zingari: An alternate term, trumpet of the Gypsies, for the scacciapensieri
- trunfa: A Sardinian jaw harp, or mouth harp, trump, similar to the scacciapensieri

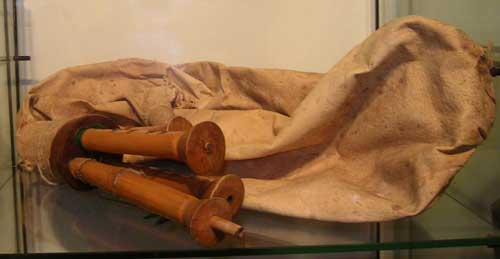
A zampogna

- tumborro: A Sardinian tambourine
- zampogna: A southern Italian bagpipe, most commonly with two drones and two conical chanters
- zampogna a paro: A single-reed and two- or three drone zampogna, found in Calabria and Sicily
- zampogna zoppa: A mostly double-reed and variably droned zampogna, found in central Italy

== Songs, formats and pieces ==
- addio padre: A post-war political song
- ajri: A form of Albanian-Calabrian multi-part song
- asprese: A form of multi-part song from Lazio
- banda comunale: A local, civic band
- a bandieri bella: A form of Calabrian secular multi-part song
- baride: Sicilian brass bands
- basso: A kind of song in Dignano
- bei: A kind of Tuscan polyphony, especially known near Monte Amiata, also bei-bei
- bitinada: A singing style for three men, most common in Rovigno in Istria
- boare: work songs
- canti alla boara: A kind of lyric song associated with the cantaustorie
- buiasche: A kind of polyphonic song from the village of Bogli
- butunada: A song form peculiar to Rovigno
- camminareccia: A piece of wedding music in the sonata per la sposa of Alta Sabina
- canzone a ballo: A dance song
- canzone Italiana: Italian song
- canzone Napoletana: A kind of popular song from Naples, Neapolitan song
- canzune: A Sicilian term for lyric songs
- canti a catoccu: A kind of lyric song
- canti carnascialeschi: Carnival songs
- cepranese: A form of multi-part song from Lazio
- cioparedda: A form of Calabrian multi-part song
- concertini: Small, violin-based ensembles most common in Emilia, Bagolino and Resia
- canto a coppia': A kind of central Italian two-part singing similar to canti a vatoccu
- cozzupara: A form of Calabrian multi-part song
- canto a dispetto: A Tuscan term, song of the despised, equivalent to canto a vatoccu
- endecasillabo: A central Italian song form with phrases of eleven syllables
- canti alla falciatora: Scything songs
- fogli volanti: Printed popular songs called in English broadsides, most commonly used for Italian ballads
- giustiniane: A kind of popular historic song, named after Leonardo Giustiniani
- laude: Strophic songs, often in Latin
- canti lirici: Italian lyric songs, or canto lirico-monostrifici
- canti alla longa: A kind of lyric song
- maggi a serenata: A maggio love song
- maggio della anime purganti: A maggio song for the souls in Purgatory
- maggio delle ragazze: A maggio song for young girls
- maggio drammatico: A music and drama celebration held during maggio
- maitinade: A kind of dance song, most common in Trento; it is composed of six-line stanzas of eleven syllables per line
- mantignada: A song form peculiar to Sissano
- metitora: A form of two-part song from Lazio
- canti alla mietitora: Harvesting songs
- mondine: A kind of rural, woman's folk song
- canto alla monmarella: work songs
- montasolina: A form of multi-part song from Lazio
- ninna nanna: A folk lullaby
- a oli oledda: A form of Calabrian multi-part song
- orazioni: A kind of Sicilian narrative folk song
- canti degli orbi: A kind of Sicilian narrative folk song, associated with blind musicians
- orologio della passione: An alternate term, used in musical collections, for the canto della passione
- ottava rima: An eight line song, most common in Central Italy, especially Lazio, Tuscany and Abruzzo
- pajarella: A form of Lazio multi-part song
- canto della passione: A central Italian begging song, performed before Easter, also known as orologio della passione (clock of the passion)
- alla pennese: A kind of two-part singing from Lazio, similar to canti a vatoccu
- canto a pennese: A work song
- canti a pera: A kind of lyric song from Gallesano
- piagnereccia: A piece of wedding music in the sonata per la sposa of Alta Sabina
- poeti contadini: An alternate term, peasant poets, for ottava rima
- polesane: A kind of dance song
- canti de questua: Begging songs
- recchia: A kind of central Italian two-part singing similar to canti a vatoccu
- a recchione: A form of multi-part song from Lazio
- a reuta: A form of Lazian multi-part song
- rispetti: A kind of lyric song
- a rosabella: A form of Calabrian multi-part song
- serenata: A love song
- sonata per la sposa: A musical ritual from Alta Sabina
- sonetto: A lyrical form consisting of four lines of seven syllables
- canti alla stesa: A kind of lyric song
- stornelli: A kind of solo lyric song, from the Provençal estorn, to challenge
- stornello: A Sicilian folk song
- storia: A kind of southern, long song
- strambotti: A kind of lyric song, from the Provençal estribar, to lash
- stranotti: A kind of lyric song
- strina: A form of Calabrian multi-part song
- tenores: Sardinian polyphonic chant
- testamenti: A kind of Carnival song
- tiir: A kind of polyphonic song from Premana in Lombardy
- trallalero: A kind of Genoese polyphony
- canti a vatoccu: A kind of polyphonic lyric song, usually for two to three women, songs in the manner of a bell clapper, most common in Umbria, and the Apennines of Abruzza and the Marche
- verolana: A form of multi-part song from Lazio
- villanella: A form of Calabrian multi-part song
- villotte: A kind of lyric song with verses of 8 or 11 syllables
- a voca regolare: A form of Calabrian multi-part song
- a voca diritta: A form of Calabrian multi-part song
- vjersh: A form of Albanian multi-part song found in Calabria and Basilicata

== Techniques ==
- accordo: A multi-part singing technique, also canto ad accordo
- basci: The bass voice in a trallalero ensemble
- bassu: The bass voice of the Sardinian tenores
- boghe: The lead vocalist of a Sardinian tenores ensemble
- chitarra: A guitar, also a voice in trallalero ensembles that imitates the guitar
- contra: The counter-vocalist of the Sardinian tenores
- controbasso: The baritone vocalist of the trallalero tradition
- contrubassu: Alternate term for controbasso, the baritone vocalist of the trallalero tradition
- cuntrètu: A falsetto voice
- mesa boghe: The middle voice of the Sardinian tenores
- primmu: The tenor voice in a trallalero ensemble

== Other terms ==
- bandautore: A cantautore who composes music for a band
- bello ideale: An aesthetic idea which embraced a predominant melody and other elements, beautiful ideal
- boghe ballu: In Sardinian, harmony, or a danceable singing rhythm, literally we dance with our voice
- cantastorie: Itinerant musicians, now most commonly found in Sicily
- cantautori: Popular, modern singer-songwriters
- carnevale: The Italian Carnival
- carnevale de Bagolino: A very famous Carnival, in the town of Bagolino, Brescia
- condanna della vecchiaccia: An Umbrian ceremony that heralds the return of spring, the condemnation of the crone
- maggio: A May celebration
- mamutones: Masked performers in processions in Mamoiada in Sardinia
- scacciamarzo: A spring holiday
- sega la vecchia: An old mid-Lent ceremony, the sawing of the witch
- tarantate: Women who had been supposedly poisoned by the tarantula bite, and intended to cure themselves through the tarantella ritual
- tratto marzo: A spring holiday
- urlatori: A shouter, an expressive vocalist
- la vecchia: A carnevale ritual from Pontelangiorno
- veglie: A central Italian musical gathering
