= No potho reposare =

1920 song

"A Diosa", better known as "No potho reposare" (IPA: [nɔ ˈpɔθɔ rɛpɔˈzaɾɛ, - ˈpɔtɔ -]; transl. "I can't rest"), is a 1920 song composed by Giuseppe Rachel in the tempo of English waltz on Nuorese-language lyrics from a homonymous 1915 poem by Salvatore Sini.

Since 1921, "A Diosa" was part of the repertoire of the Philharmonic Body of Nuoro, directed by Rachel himself. In 1936, the tenor Maurizio Carta recorded three verses of the song in a 78 rpm for Pathé Records. In 1957, on the initiative of the musician and musicologist Gavino Gabriel, a version of the Coro di Nuoro was recorded in Turin. In 1975, the folk singer Anna Loddo recorded the song in her album "Tremolio di Canne (ca so tremende che fozzas de canna)", for Fonit Cetra Records. In 1978, Maria Carta recorded the song in a 45 rpm for Polydor Records.

== Notable recordings ==
- Maurizio Carta
- Maria Teresa Cau
- Maria Carta
- Anna Loddo
- Animas
- Duo Puggioni
- Andrea Parodi with Tazenda
- Andrea Parodi with Al Di Meola
- Noa
- Gianna Nannini with Gavino Murgia
- Antonella Ruggiero
- Marco Carta
- Bianca Atzei with Tazenda
- Plácido Domingo

=== Instrumental versions ===
- Paolo Fresu with Jan Lundgren, Lars Danielsson and Clarence Penn
- Al Di Meola

=== Symphonic variations ===
- Hardy Mertens

== See also ==
- Music of Sardinia
