= Gian Paolo Mele =

Italian conductor, composer and musicologist (1944–2018)

Gian Paolo Mele (Nuoro, June 10, 1944 – Nuoro, February 15, 2018) was an Italian choral conductor, composer and ethnomusicologist. Already at an early age he was interested in ethnomusicology; he became director of the Coro di Nuoro (Chorus of Nuoro), and he edited the editions of a remarkable record and audiovisual production of Sardinia's folk music.

In 2003, he composed the soundtrack of the film Three-Step Dance by Salvatore Mereu.

== See also ==
- Music of Sardinia
