= Paolo Angeli =

- Genres: Sardinian music, experimental music, improvised music
- Occupation(s): Guitarist, composer
- Instrument(s): Prepared guitar, Chiterra sarda
- Years active: 1995–present

Paolo Angeli (born 1970 in Olbia, Sardinia, Italy) is a guitarist, composer, ethnomusicologist and instrument builder associated with traditional Sardinian music, flamenco, jazz, post-rock and experimental music. He plays his own prepared Sardinian guitar, an orchestra-instrument with 18 cords, a hybrid between guitar, cello and drums, gifted with hammers, pedals at variable speed.

== Discography ==
- 1995, "Dove dormono gli autobus", CD, Erosha
- 1997, "Linee di fuga", CD, Posada Jazz Project, Erosha PJP 002, ERH 012Erosha
- 2003, "Bucato", ReR Megacorp PA1
- 2004, "MA.RI ", with Antonello Salis Auand Records AU9005
- 2005, "Nita – L'Angelo Sul Trapezio (An Imaginary Soundtrack)", ReR Megacorp PA2
- 2007, "Tessuti (Paolo Angeli Plays Frith & Björk) ", (CD, Album),ReR Megacorp ReR PA3
- 2009, "Free Zone Appleby", with Evan Parker, Ned Rothenberg (CD, Album), PSI (3) psi 08.04
- 2010, "Tibi", (ReR),
- 2010, "Giornale di bordo", in collaboration with Antonello Salis, Gavino Murgia, Hamid Drake
- 2011, Itsunomanika, with Takumi Fukushima – (CD, Album) ReR Megacorp (ReR PA5), Offset Records (OFF555003), Le Arti Malandrine (ALU008), Angeli Productions (none)
- 2013, "Sale quanto basta", (ReR)
- 2017, "Talea", (Solo World Tour 2015/16) 2CD, ReR Megacorp – AnMa ReR PA10

== Bibliography ==
- Andrea Aguzzi, Chitarre Visionarie. Conversazioni con chitarristi alternativi, Lulu, 2014
