= Maggio =

Maggio is a surname. Notable people with the surname include:

- Beniamino Maggio (1907–1990), Italian actor
- Christian Maggio (born 1982), Italian football player
- Dante Maggio (1909–1992), Italian actor
- Enzo Maggio (1902–1978), Italian actor
- Marty Maggio (1949–2011), American musician
- Mattia Maggio (born 1994), German-Italian football player
- Pupella Maggio (1910–1999), Italian film actress
- Rosalia Maggio (1921–1995), Italian actress, dancer, singer and showgirl
- Veronica Maggio (born 1981), Swedish singer
- Baldassare Di Maggio (born 1954), Mafia member

== See also ==
- Maggio drammatico
- Maggio Musicale Fiorentino, an annual opera festival
