= Tenore di Bitti "Mialinu Pira" =

Italian music group

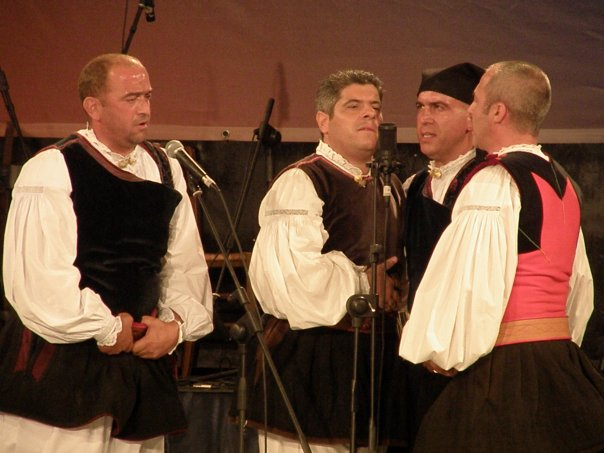
- Tenore di Bitti "Mialinu Pira" in concert in, 2009

Background information
- Origin: Sardinia (Italy)
- Genre: Cantu a tenore
- Years active: 1995–present
- Members: Omar Bandinu; Marco Serra; Bachisio Pira; Arcangelo Pittudu
- Past members: Dino Ruiu; Gianfranco Cossellu
- Website: tenoresdibitti.com

Tenore di Bitti "Mialinu Pira" is a Sardinian ensemble formed in 1995, specialized in the Sardinian cantu a tenore. The Cantu a tenore is a style of polyphonic folk singing characteristic of the Barbagia region of the island, even though some other Sardinian sub-regions bear examples of such tradition. The cantu a tenore was proclaimed by the UNESCO "Masterpieces of the Oral and Intangible Heritage" in 2005.

== Biography ==
The Tenore di Bitti "Mialinu Pira" has a special place among groups in Sardinia. Having a style which is less rough than that of other styles, researchers in his heritage, executors with vocal quality, people, they have gained notoriety in Sardinia and in the whole world. They made performances on national television programs. In the last few years they've been touring Europe (France, Germany, Denmark, Norway, Czech Republic, Spain, Belgium, Nederland, Austria, Luxembourg, Slovenia, Swiss, Ireland, Croatia, Serbia, Lithuania, Estonia, Poland, Tunisia, Hungary, United Arab Emirates, Brazil and Japan). They have participated in 2001 to the Christmas Concert in the Vatican for the Pope John Paul II, the concert in May 2009 in the Concertgebouw Theater in Amsterdam and in December in the Church of the Nativity in Bethlehem.

The Tenore di Bitti "Mialinu Pira" are considered by music-fans and ethno-musicologists the most prominent example of their style of vocal art. Also lauded is their accuracy in choosing lyrics. Both in dancing (lestru, dillu, seriu, passu torrau,) and slow (isterrita, boch'e notte) forms, the lyrics, by famous poets or from lesser-known contemporary authors, make the repertoire of Tenore di Bitti "Mialinu Pira" a vehicle of literary transmission. These songs are profane poems speaking about the shepherds and their solitude in touch with the nature, referring to the popular world and its traditions. The religious' songs are performed in church, in particular, moments of the liturgical year (Christmas, Easter or patronal feasts) or during the religious processions through the street of the village of Bitti. The Grobbes and some lullabies for Baby Jesus (su Nenneddu) belong to this repertoire.

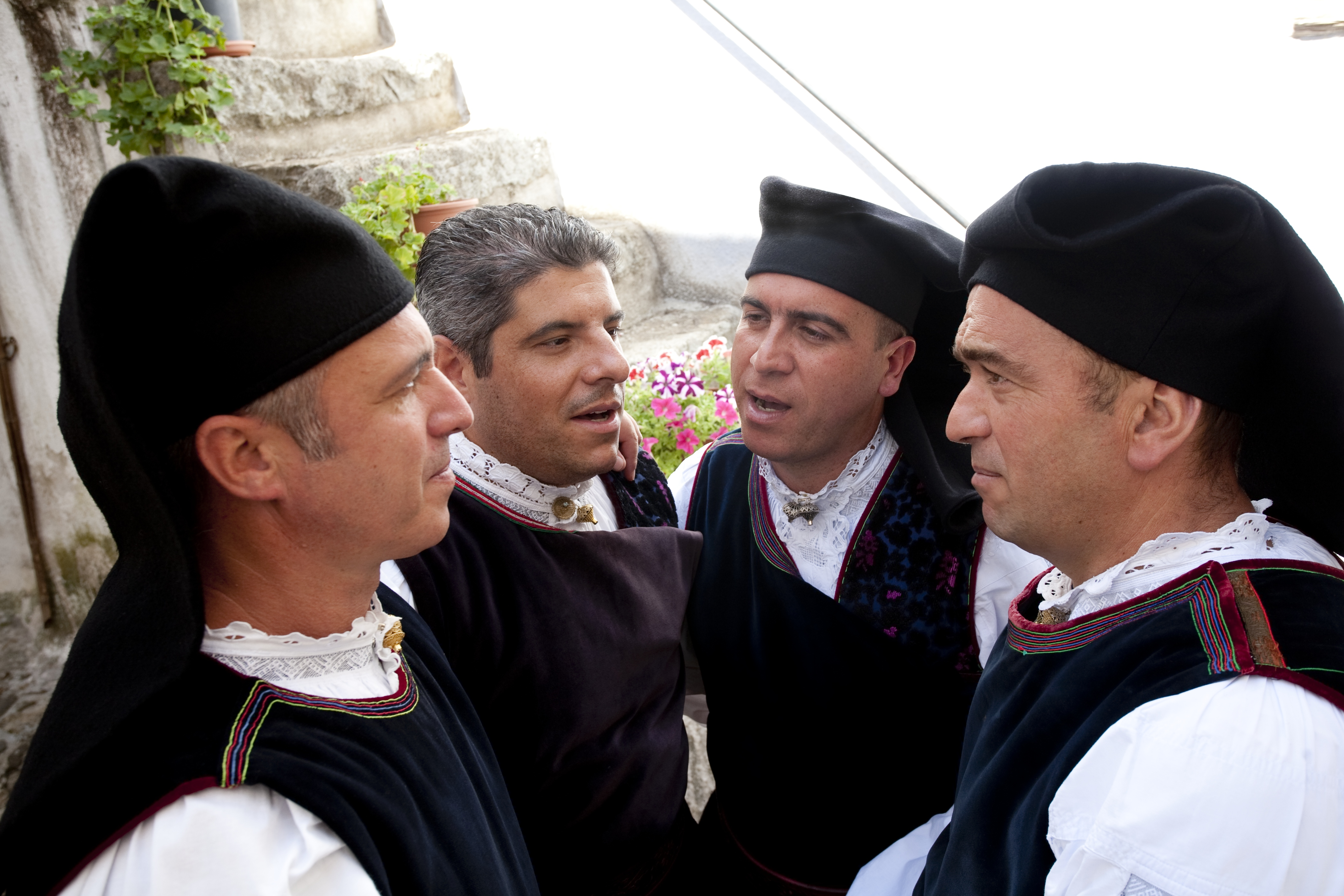
Tenore di Bitti "Mialinu Pira", it's a traditional vocal quartet "a cappella" from the island of Sardinia.

== The "a tenore song" ==
The Tenore singing (cantu a tenore) is one of the more ancient ways of singing in the Mediterranean area. Nothing about its origins is sure, but the historians maintain that this traditional polyphony goes back to 3000 years ago.... The singing is made a cappella by four male voices (oche, mesu oche, bassu and contra), the main feature of this polyphony is represented by basso and contra because of their guttural and ancestral sound. The Tenore singing from Bitti, in the centre of Sardinia, is a unique vocal style. It immediately succeeds in sounding primitive and strong. It is no mere coincidence that the experts think that it may have had its origin in primitive times as an imitation of nature: the four voices of which the choir is composed is no more than the lowing of cattle, the bleating of sheep and the sound of the wind. These were harmonised and given poetic lyrics of age-old beauty. The guttural use of voices and the typical songs of intonation, cannot be confused with anything else and make this millenary art have great impact. A magic of the human voice. The a Tenore Song was proclaimed by the Unesco "Masterpieces of the Oral and Intangible Heritage" in 2005.

== Members ==
- Bachisio Pira - Oche e Mesu Oche
- Arcangelo Pittudu - Oche e Mesu Oche
- Omar Bandinu - Bassu
- Marco Serra - Contra

== Awards ==
- 2003 - Prix Maria Carta

== Discography ==
- CD "Su Monte 'e Mesus" recorded and mixed in Rockhouse Blu Studio (Sassari). MC 1998, CD 2000
- CD "Tenores" VOL. 1 compilation recorded and mixed in Live Studio by Marco Luzzu and Giovanni Carlini. Cagliari 2003
- CD "Musica Sacra International" live recording Germany in Martin's church in Kaufbeuren St. (Germany) on 29 May 2004
- CD Highlights of the 51st Cork International Choral Festival 2005 'Ethnic & Other Voices'
- CD e DVD, Orchestra mediterranea, live recording in San Paolo of Brasil on 2005
- CD Ost Soundtrack 'Meine schöne Bescherung'. Colonia (Germania) 2007
- CD Cunzertos (concerts live). TDB Mialinu Pira, Italia 2013

Ballu Seriu starts with single voices (Oche, Bassu, Contra, Mesu Oche)
Tenores di Bitti Mialinu Pira Live recording in Modena, June 2011
