= Boghe =

Boghe may refer to:

- the lead vocalist of a Sardinian tenores ensemble, according to the article Italian music terminology
- a town in the Brakna region of Mauritania
