= Chiterra sarda =

Type of guitar from Sardinia

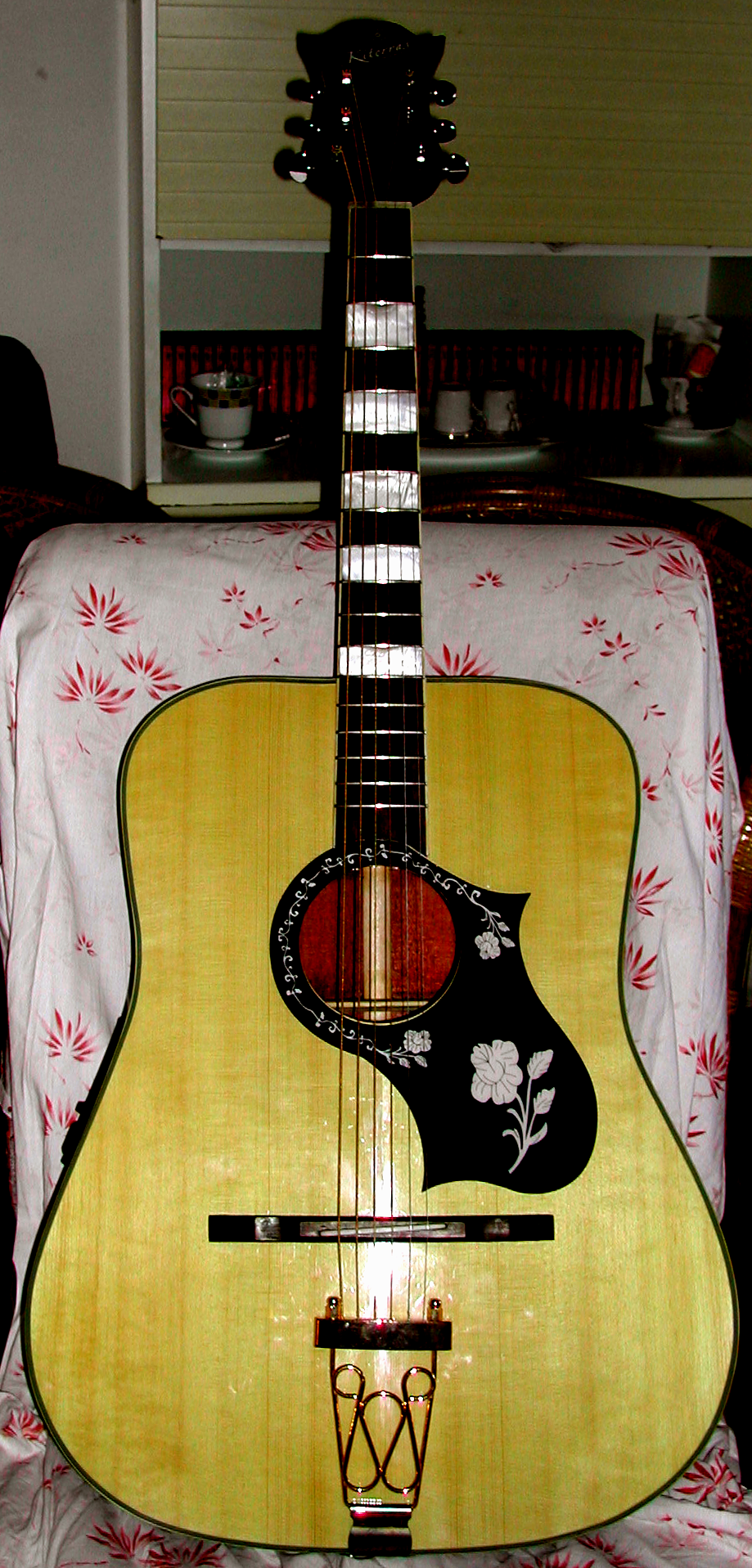
- A chiterra sarda

String instrument
- Other names: Chitarra sarda, chitarrone, chitarra gigante
- Classification: String instrument
- Hornbostel–Sachs classification: 321.322 (Composite chordophone)

Related instruments
- Baritone guitar, Dreadnought guitar

More articles or information
- Music of Sardinia

The chiterra sarda (Sardinian for "Sardinian guitar") or chitarra sarda in Italian, is a large-bodied baritone guitar from Sardinia used primarily to accompany singers in the cantu a chiterra genre. The body is larger than a dreadnought guitar with a scale length of about 680mm. In Italian, it also goes by the names chitarrone and chitarra gigante, both referring to its large size.

== Tuning ==
It is usually tuned a fourth lower than a standard guitar: B (Si) E (Mi) A (La) D (Re) F# (Fa#) B (Si).

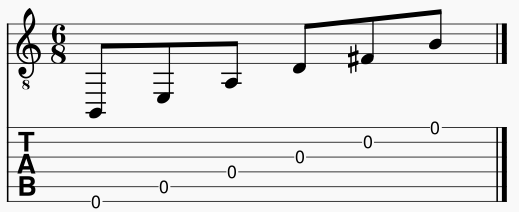
Standard tuning of the chiterra sarda

== Notable players ==
- Paolo Angeli
