= Deus ti salvet Maria =

Traditional Sardinian devotional song

The Deus ti salvet Maria (also known simply as the "Sardinian Hail Mary") is a devotional song belonging to the Sardinian tradition of the Gosos, written in Sardinian language in the 18th century by the poet Bonaventura Licheri (Neoneli, 1667–1733). The lyrics were translated around 1725; the oldest transcription is the one of Maurizio Carrus, who had inserted it as an appendix in the Rosary of San Vero Milis in 1731. The Laude is sung in the form of the gosos, a typical devotional song widespread in Sardinia.

In 1974 Sardinian singer Maria Carta presented it to the general public on the Canzonissima television show; in 1987 she performed it at St. Patrick's Cathedral in New York, accompanied by a pipe organ.

== Performers ==
- Maria Teresa Cau
- Maria Carta
- Anna Loddo
- Coro di Nuoro
- Andrea Parodi with Tazenda
- Mark Harris with Fabrizio De André
- Savina Yannatou, arr. by Haris Lambrakis
- Savina Yannatou with Elena Ledda
- Franca Masu
- Gianni Maroccolo with Ginevra Di Marco
- Antonella Ruggiero
- Clara Murtas, arr. by Ennio Morricone

== See also ==
- Music of Sardinia
