= Coro di Nuoro =

Italian choir

- Also known as: CAS
- Origin: Nuoro, Italy
- Genres: Choral, popular, a cappella
- Occupation: Men's choir
- Years active: 1952–present
- Website: facebook.com/CorodiNuoro/

Coro di Nuoro is an Italian choir that performs popular and traditional Sardinian songs, including No potho reposare, Deus ti salvet Maria, the Miserere, and the Stabat Mater. Gian Paolo Mele is a former conductor of the choir.

== History ==
The Coro di Nuoro was born in 1952 at the behest of a group of young music lovers, popular songs and popular traditions in particular of Nuoro and Barbagia. In 1955 the choir had participated and won the national radio music festival "Il campanile d'oro". In 1965 the choir director became Gian Paolo Mele and, through his intense work, over the years, numerous melodies of the popular songs of Sardinia were recovered. In addition, Mele had put to music several compositions of some Nuoro poets, making them real popular songs that have become heritage of the island culture, including: "Zia Tatana Faragone", "Adios, Nugoro Amada", "Sa crapola".

== Discography ==
- 1966 – "La Sardegna nel canto e nella danza"
- 1971 – "Adios Nugoro amada"
- 1972 – "Coro di Nuoro" – 3 Audiocassette – Aedo
- 1975 – "Canti popolari della Sardegna", Tirsu, LP. 715
- 1995 – "Antologia dei canti tradizionali della Sardegna"

== See also ==
- Nuoro
- Music of Sardinia
