= Bifora =

Bifora may refer to:

- Bifora (musical instrument), a traditional Sicilian double-reed wind instrument
- Bifora (plant), a genus of flowering plant
- Bifora (architecture), the Italian term for a mullioned window with two lights
