= Italian musical terms =

Italian musical terms may refer to:

- Italian musical terms used in English
- Italian music terminology
