= Mutu =

Mutu may refer to:

== People ==
- Adrian Mutu (born 1979), Romanian footballer
- Daniel Mutu (born 1987), Romanian footballer
- Margaret Mutu, New Zealand academic
- Pârvu Mutu (1657–1735), Wallachian Romanian muralist and church painter
- Wangechi Mutu (born 1972), Kenyan-born American visual artist
- Mutu Kapa (1870–1968), New Zealand tribal leader, orator, sportsman and Anglican priest

== Other uses ==
- Mutu language, spoken in Papua New Guinea
- Mutu (music), a type of improvised sung poetry from Sardinia
