= Maria Carta =

Sardinian singer (1934–1994)

Maria Carta OMRI
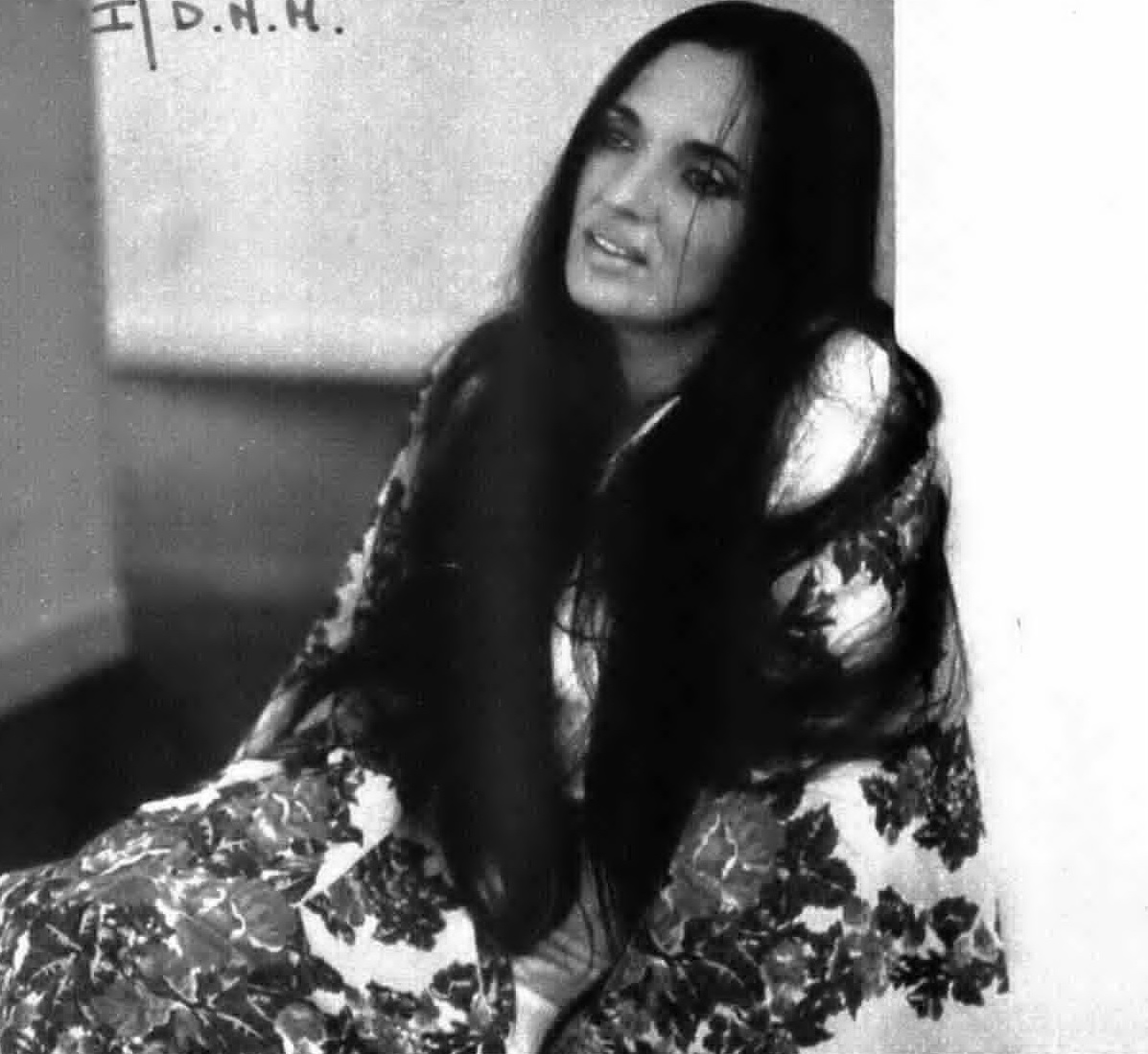
- Maria Carta

Background information
- Born: 24 June 1934; Siligo, Sardinia, Italy
- Died: 22 September 1994 (aged 60) Rome, Italy
- Genres: Pop; folk; musica leggera
- Occupations: Singer; actress
- Years active: 1970–1994
- Labels: RCA Records; Polydor Records; BMG Ricordi; Fonit Cetra; Le Chant du Monde; Music of the World
- Website: Fondazione Maria Carta

Maria Carta (24 June 1934 – 22 September 1994) was a Sardinian folk music singer-songwriter. She also performed in film and theatre. In 1975 she wrote a book of poetry, Canto rituale (Ritual Song).

Throughout her career Carta covered a number of genres of traditional music of her native Sardinia (cantu a chiterra, ninne nanne—children's lullabies, gosos, Gregorian chants, and more), often reinterpreting them in more modernized and personal ways. She brought Sardinian folk music into wider popular awareness in demonstrations at a national level in Italy (like the Canzonissima in 1974) as well as internationally, mainly in France and the United States.

== Career ==
Maria Carta won the Miss Sardinia beauty contest in 1957 and later participated in the national Miss Italy competition.

Around 1960, she moved to Rome where she met the screenwriter Salvatore Laurani whom she later married. She attended the Centro Nazionale di Studi di Musica Popolare, directed by Diego Carpitella, at the National Academy of Santa Cecilia and at the same time she pursued a musical and ethnographic research path with important productions and collaborations.

In 1971, she made two albums: Sardegna canta and Paradiso in re, and in the meantime she attended the ethnomusicologist Gavino Gabriel. The same year RAI broadcast the television documentary Incontro con Maria Carta (photography by Franco Pinna and texts by Velia Magno), in which she sang and recited with Riccardo Cucciolla.

In 1972, she played at the Teatro Argentina in Rome in the Medea by Franco Enriquez. The same year she met Amália Rodrigues, with whom she held a concert at the Teatro Sistina. In 1973, the two artists made a tour in Sardinia.

In 1974, she participated in Canzonissima, interpreting the traditional Sardinian Ave Maria Deus ti salvet Maria. She reached the final and was ranked second in the group of folk music with the song Amore disisperadu. In 1975, she held an important concert at the Bolshoi Theatre in Moscow. In 1976, she served as Communal Councilwoman for the Italian Communist Party, in the city council of Rome and remained in office until 1981.

In 1980, she participated in the Festival d'Avignon; in 1987 she performed in St. Patrick's Cathedral in New York City; and in 1988 in St. Mary's Cathedral in San Francisco.

She caught the attention of such directors as Francis Ford Coppola – who gave her the first of two of her widely-seen film roles as the mother of Vito Corleone in The Godfather Part II (1974) – and Franco Zeffirelli, who cast her as Martha, the sister of Lazarus, in Jesus of Nazareth (1977).

In 1985, she was awarded, as songwriter, the Targo Tenco for dialectal/regional music.

In the last years of her life, Carta gave her time to the University of Bologna where she conducted a series of classes and advised student theses on which she had relevant personal, human experience and scholarly background.

In 1991, the President of Italy, Francesco Cossiga, named her a "Commendatore della Repubblica" ("Knight of the Republic"), similar to the British CBE.

== Death ==
Maria Carta gave her last concert in Toulouse, France, on 30 June 1994. Ill with cancer, she died at her home in Rome on 22 September 1994, aged 60.

== Discography ==
- 1971: Sardegna canta
- 1971: Ninna nanna / Muttos de amore
- 1971: Adiu a mama / Antoneddu Antoneddu
- 1971: Trallallera corsicana / La ragazza moderna
- 1971: Paradiso in Re
- 1973: Nuovo maggio / Funerale di un lavoratore
- 1974: Dilliriende
- 1974: Amore disisperadu / Ave Maria
- 1974: Dies Irae
- 1975: Diglielo al tuo Dio / Nuovo maggio
- 1975: Maria Carta
- 1976: Vi canto una storia assai vera
- 1976: La voce e i canti di Maria Carta vol.1
- 1976: La voce e i canti di Maria Carta vol. 2
- 1978: No potho reposare / Ballada ogliastrina / Muttettu
- 1978: Umbras
- 1980: Haidiridiridiridiridinni
- 1984: Maria Carta concerto dal vivo
- 1981: Sonos ‘e memoria
- 1984: Sonos’ e memoria
- 1992: Chelu e mare
- 1993: Le memorie della musica
- 1993: Muttos ‘e amore
- 1993: Trallallera
- 2002: Sardegna canta
- 2012: Il Recital di Maria Carta e Amalia Rodriguez with Amália Rodrigues (live album) Recorded in Rome in 1972.

== Filmography ==
Year	Title	Role	Notes
The Godfather Part II	1974	Vito Corleone's mother	by Francis Ford Coppola
Cecilia – Storia di una comune anarchica	1975	Olimpia	by Jean-Louis Comolli
Cadaveri eccellenti	1976	Signora Cres	by Francesco Rosi
Jesus of Nazareth	1977	Martha	by Franco Zeffirelli; TV Mini-series
Un reietto delle isole	1980		Based on by Joseph Conrad's novel An Outcast of the Islands by Giorgio Moser; TV Movie
Derborence	1985	Singer	
The Professor	1986	The mother	by Giuseppe Tornatore
Disamistade	1988	"Madre Di Sebastiano"	by Gianfranco Cabiddu
Il commissario Corso	1992		telefilm
Il respiro della valle	1992		(final film role)
