= Cantu a chiterra =

Sardinian form of monophonic singing

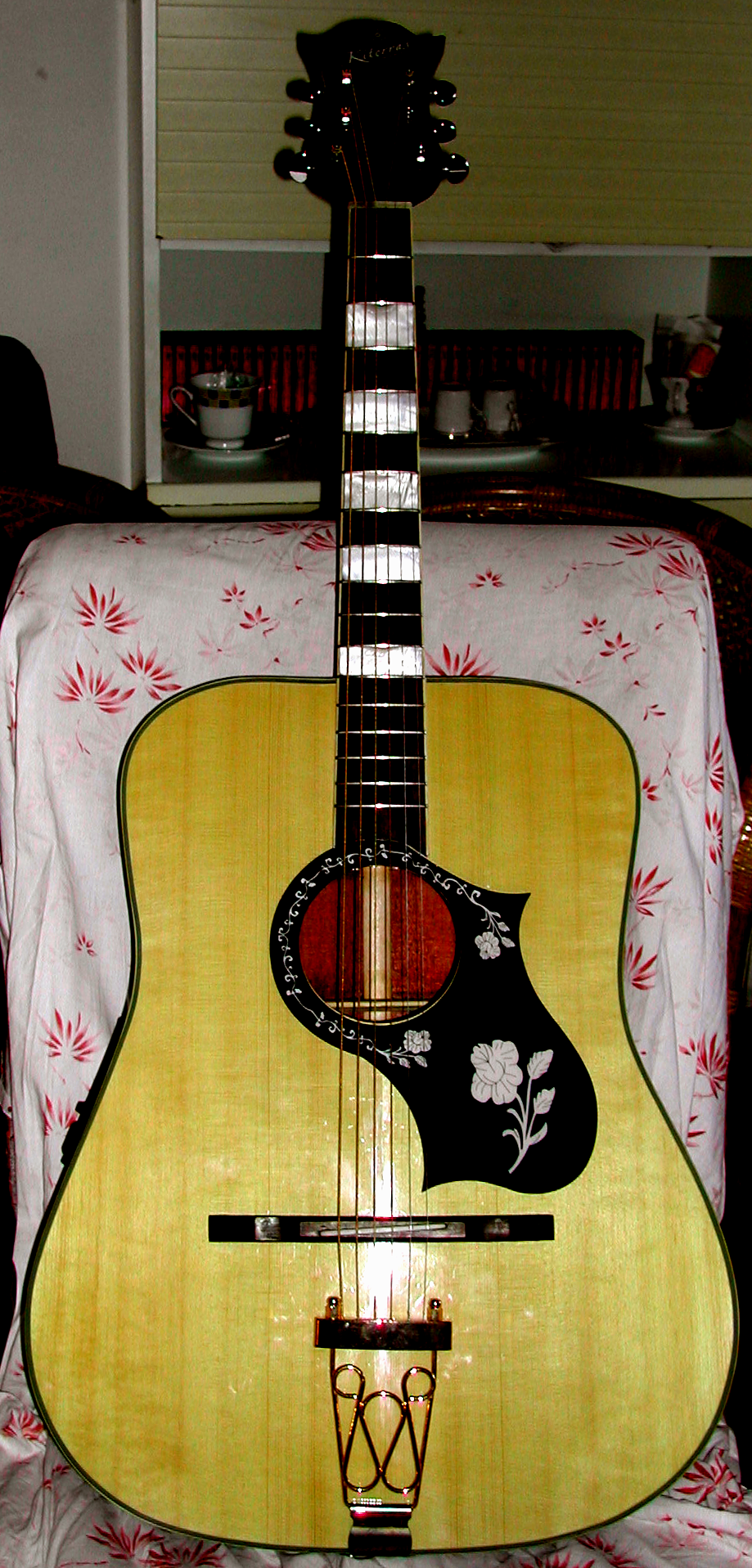
A sardinian folk guitar

The cantu a chiterra (Sardinian for "singing with guitar") is a typical Sardinian form of monophonic singing in Sardinian language and Gallurese, accompanied by a chiterra sarda, or Sardinian guitar. This type of song is particularly prevalent in the northern part of the island; in particular in the Logudoro, Goceano, Planargia and Gallura. Very likely, some of the songs existed before the invention of the guitar, for example, Cantu in re (Song in D), but with the advent of the instrument they have developed different variations.

== Competitions ==
After centuries of existing in familiar setting, the cantu a chiterra also developed during the twentieth century as a singing competition, with the guitar (sa gara), taking place in front of an audience, usually at religious festivals, in forms that are still in place.

The gara is a musical competition where two or three singers, accompanied by a guitarist, compete with their improvisations on pre-established musical themes to show the quality of their performance. The competition requires that each cantadore (singer) performs one verse at a time, alternating with the other competitors (usually being assigned three stanzas each). The musical reference model (variant) is not a form fully and completely defined, but rather a set of pre-established forms of musical structures (meter, melody, harmony) relatively undefined. So that is it allowed to each cantadore to improvise at will on the model of reference.

== Performers ==
Some of the best known performers are:

- Gavino De Lunas (Padria, 1895 – Rome, 1944)
- Maria Carta (Siligo, 1934 – Rome, 1994)
- Anna Loddo (Carbonia, 1940)
- Francesco Demuro (Porto Torres, 1978)

== Bibliography ==
- (in Italian) Gavino Gabriel, Canti di Sardegna, Milano, 1923
- (in French) Bernard Lortat-Jacob, Improvisation et modèle: le chant a guitare sarde, in «L'Homme», XXIV, 1, 1984.
- (in Italian) Francesco Gianattasio – Bernard Lortat-Jacob, Modalità di improvvisazione nella musica sarda, Culture musicali n.1, 1982, pp. 3/36
- (in Italian) Bernard Lortat-Jacob, Voci di Sardegna, Torino, 1999, ISBN 978-88-7063-399-3
- (in Italian) Paolo Angeli. Canto in Re, la gara a chitarra nella Sardegna settentrionale, ISRE, Nuoro, 2006.

== See also ==
- Music of Sardinia
