= Episcopal Public Library of Barcelona =

Special and heritage library in Barcelona

- Biblioteca Pública Episcopal de Barcelona
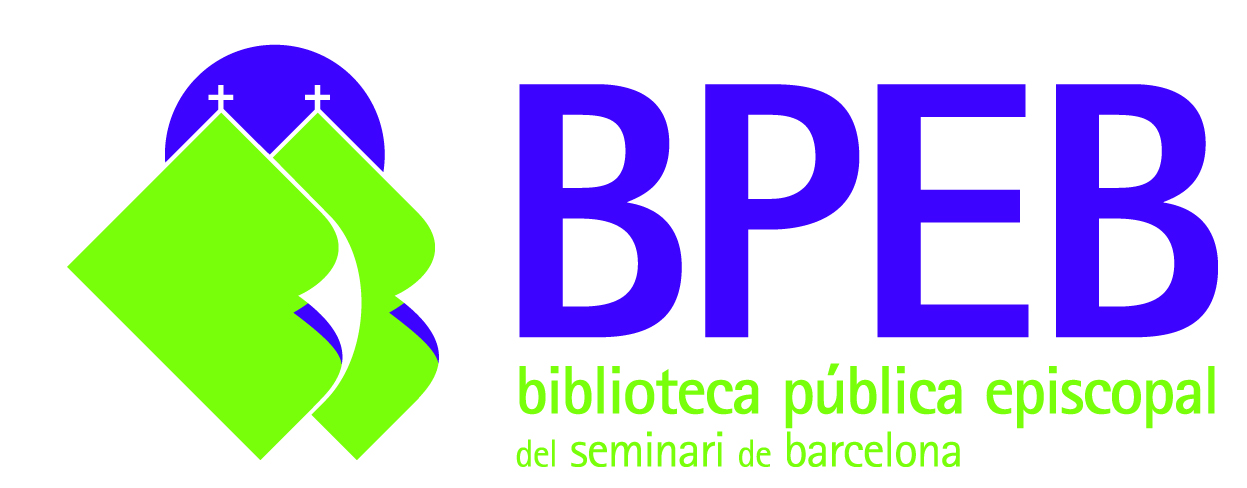

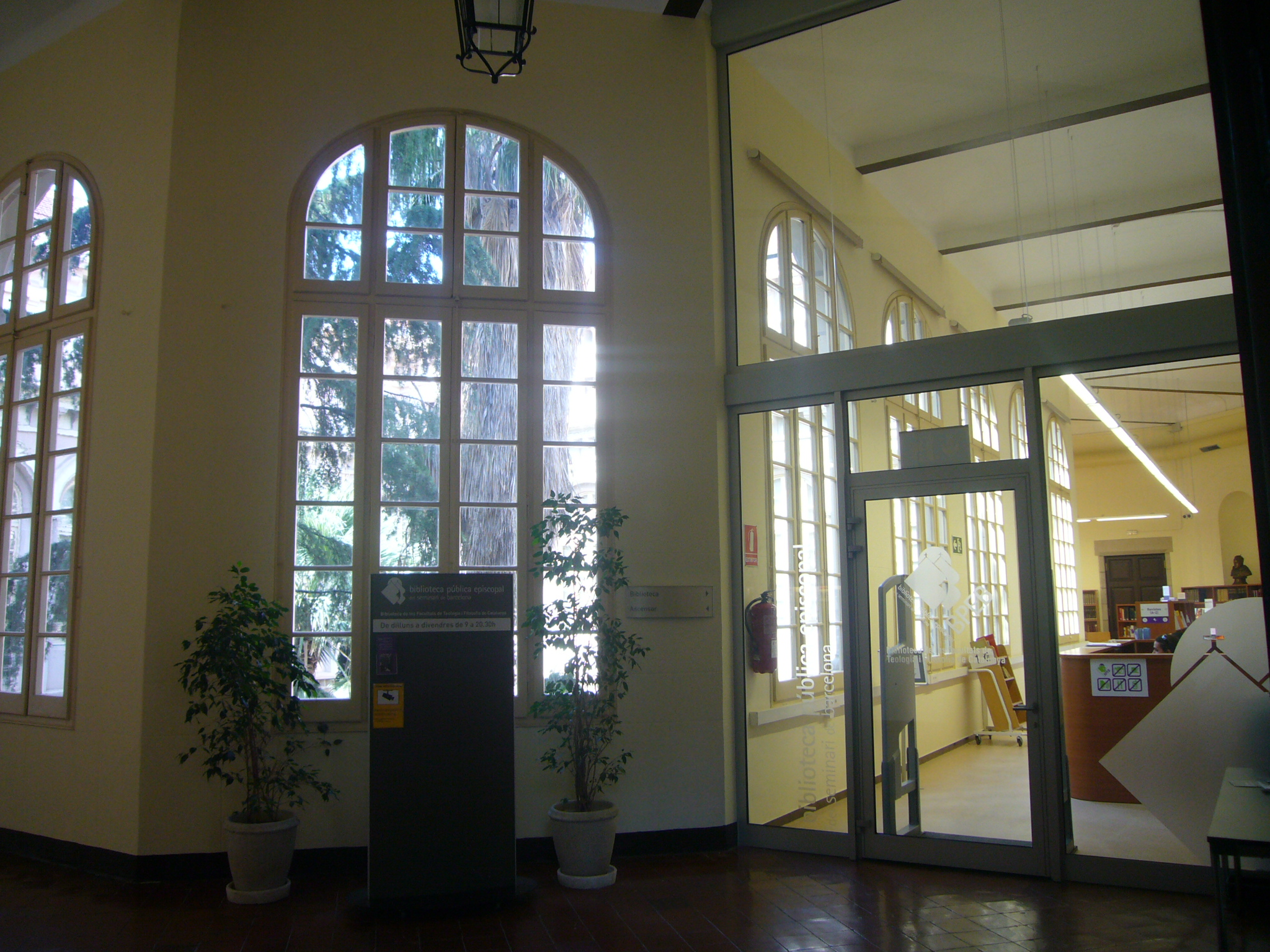
- 41°23′17″N 2°9′47″E
- Location: Diputació 231, 08007, Barcelona, Catalonia, Spain
- Type: Special library, heritage library
- Established: 1772
- Branches: 1

Collection
- Items collected: 370,291 (2019)

Access and use
- Members: 3,468 (2019)

Other information
- Director: Josep Maria Turull i Garriga
- Employees: 3
- Website: www.bibliotecaepiscopalbcn.org

The Episcopal Public Library of Barcelona (Spanish: Biblioteca Pública Episkcopal de Barcelona, BPEB), also called the Episcopal Public Library of the Seminary of Barcelona (Biblioteca Pública Episcopal del Seminari de Barcelona) is a library located in the building of the Conciliar Seminary of Barcelona. Founded in 1772, it is the oldest preserved public access library in the city of Barcelona, Spain. It houses a large collection of old and modern books, with about 360,000 volumes.

The BPEB belongs to the Roman Catholic Archdiocese of Barcelona and is its central library. It collaborates with the Collective Catalogue of the Catalan Bibliographic Heritage.

== Names ==
The library is also known as:

- Biblioteca Pública Episcopal de Barcelona (BPEB) in Catalan and Spanish
- Biblioteca Pública Episcopal del Seminari de Barcelona in Catalan
- Pública Episcopal del Seminario de Barcelona in Spanish

== Collection ==
The library houses a large collection of old and modern books, with a total of 360,507 volumes as of January 2018. The collection primarily concerns theology, ecclesiastical sciences, the Bible, philosophy, arts and humanities.

Of the library's collection, 95 of the books are incunabula (printings from before the 16th century) and 625 are manuscripts. Some of these texts are written in Arabic, and the oldest of these is dated to the 14th century. Additionally, the library holds approximately 10,000 gosos, dating from the 17th century to the present.

== History ==
=== Original building ===
The library was built in 1772 by Bishop Josep Climent i Avinent, to merge two 16th-century libraries: the old Concilar Seminary Library (or Bishop's College), created in 1593, and the Library of the College of Our Lady of Bethlehem, of the Society of Jesus, founded in 1545. This building was located on La Rambla in Barcelona. The Pragmatic Sanction of 2 April 1767, promulgated by King Charles III of Spain, had expelled the Jesuits from the kingdom; most of their assets in Barcelona came into the possession of the nearest Council Seminaries. The state ordered the bishops to do whatever was necessary to make the libraries public and useful, and librarians were hired. Our Lady of Bethlehem College became the Conciliar Seminary of Barcelona.

In January 1776, the library, located on the second floor of the seminary building, opened to the public. Fèlix Amat de Palou i Pont became the first librarian of the Episcopal Public Library of Barcelona by royal appointment in 1775 and served in this position until 1785. His successor, Joaquín Nicolás Rincón, made the first serious inventory of the entire library collection, the Inventario de Los libros contenidos en la Biblioteca. The library's collection was divided into eight large sections, with a total of 16,976 volumes.

The next librarian was Ignasi Torres i Amat de Palou (1768–1811), who served between 1795 and 1808, and who designed and initiated the Dictionary of Catalan Writers, which was completed in 1836 by his brother Fèlix Torres i Amat de Palou. They installed a library annex for Catalan authors, with assistance from Ignasi Palaudàries (librarian in BPEB 1816–1824) and the Bishop of Barcelona Pau de Sitjar i Ruata. During his mandate the first internal regulations of the library were established on 27 August 1816. It was first made public at the Library of Catalan authors in the edition of the Diario de Barcelona on 15 November 1819.

=== Current building ===
In February 1882, the Seminary moved from La Rambla to its current location on Diputació Street, outside the city walls. The new building was designed by architect Elies Rogent i Amat. The books of the BPEB collection were moved to the basement of the new building where they remained for fifteen years, until the library was installed in its current space by order of Cardinal Salvador Casañas i Pagès. This work was not completed until 1924.

During the Spanish Civil War, books were deposited in the Library of Catalonia (Biblioteca de Catalunya in Catalan), although some important collections were burned. More than 500 manuscripts were transferred to the Library of Catalonia in four periods: 2–4 July 1937; 2–5 November 1937; 15 November 1938; and 10 January 1939. All of these manuscripts were returned to the BPEB on 9 January 1943, when Josep Gros i Raguer was director.

When it returned to the Seminary, the BPEB was installed on the ground floor of the building and its inventory was catalogued by Jaume Barrera i Escudero (1879–1942). The librarians Àngel Fàbrega i Grau (1921–2017) and Antoni Briva i Mirabent (1926–1994) moved it to the first floor. Before the Spanish Civil War, the Library contained 50,000 volumes (catalogued in 1916). After the Civil War, the Library began operating again on 10 December 1940, although it was not until 22 February 1944 that the reading room was inaugurated. Later, in 1964, the library was moved to its current location on the first floor of the Seminary building.

Josep Maria Martí Bonet (librarian 1971–2018), with the help of the Faculty of Theology of Catalonia and the Seminary itself, hired librarians for the cataloging of the more than 370,000 books currently in the BPEB. Since then, professional librarians have been working at the BPED and are responsible for its management, alongside the director of the Governing Board of the Seminary. In 2011, the reformed Library Reading Room was inaugurated. Covering 242 square metres (2,600 sq ft), it has 47 reading points and more than 11,000 volumes with free access. On 16 March 2016, the newly reformed restricted access storage deposits of the Library was inaugurated.

== Bibliography ==
- Alarcón i Campdepadrós, Xavier. Història de la Biblioteca Pública Episcopal del Seminari de Barcelona, la més antiga de la ciutat. Barcelona: Biblioteca Pública Episcopal del Seminari de Barcelona, 2014.
