= Massimo Moriconi =

Massimo Moriconi may refer to:

- Massimo Moriconi (musician) (born 1955), Italian bassist
- Massimo Moriconi (canoeist) (born 1956), Italian sprint canoer
