= Mutu (music) =

Improvised sung poetry from Sardinia, Italy

A mutu is a type of improvised sung poetry found in Sardinia. These are traditionally sung mostly by women in response to the male. This type of improvisation called battorinas (in English: quatrains).

Mutus consist of paired verses (in Sardinian: duina), usually one slightly longer than the other (for example 3 + 4 lines). The first is known as the isterrida (opening) and the second as the torrada (response), with the torrada repeating at the argument of the isterrida. The mutos are sung during the gara (competition) of the cantu a chiterra.

== Names ==
The plural of mutu in Sardinian is mutos. However, they are variously also known as muttu, mutettu, repentina or ottada. The term mut(t)u prevails in the northern part of the island and is attested since the 8th century.

== See also ==
- Music of Sardinia

== Bibliography ==
- Garzia, Raffaele (1977 - 1917). Mutettus cagliaritani, Cagliari, EDES
- Cirese, Alberto Mario (1977). Struttura e origine morfologica dei mutos e dei mutettus sardi; e Alcune questioni terminologiche in materia di poesia popolare sarda: mutu, mutettu, battorina, taja, Cagliari, Edizioni 3T
- Perria, Giovanni (2012). Mutetus e mutos: tipologia, struttura, funzione, provided with a CD, PTM, Mogoro
