= Andreas Fridolin Weis Bentzon =

Danish literary historian and ethnographer ( 1936–1971)

Andreas Fridolin Weis Bentzon (Copenhagen, 23 May 1936, Copenhagen – 21 December 1971, Bentzon) was a Danish ethnomusicologist and anthropologist.

== Biography ==
In 1952, during the school holidays, Bentzon went to Sardinia and returned in 1953 and 1955. During this second visit he met the launeddas player Felice Pili who "emigrated" from Villaputzu in Santa Giusta. He returned once again for about eight months in the two-year period 1957/1958, this time with a scholarship, and went to Cabras, Villaputzu, stayed for a long time in Ortacesus[1] then to Cagliari and Oristano where he carried out his research work, associating with the most important players, making numerous and precious recordings, films, photographs of the greatest players of the time: Dionigi Burranca, Pasqualino Erriu, Aurelio Porcu, Giovanni Lai, Giovanni Casu and, above all, Efisio Melis and Antonio Lara.

== Bentzon Fund ==
The Bentzon Fund is kept at the Istituto superiore regionale etnografico of Nuoro (ISRE) with numerous documents donated by the University of Copenhagen. In addition to sound recordings, Bentzon took numerous photographs during his various research campaigns and long stays in Sardinia between 1953 and 1969.

After the scholar's death, the Institute of Ethnology and Anthropology of the University of Copenhagen, following the interest of the writer Maria Giacobbe, donated the Fund to the ISRE. The materials preserved in the ISRE were collected mainly in Nule, where Bentzon and his wife Ruth had stayed for long periods between 1965 and 1969. The collection consists of a few thousand typewritten cards in English, organized into "Topics", "Sources" and "Registries", which had been cataloged by Benzton and his wife in Copenhagen with the participation of the group of students of the so-called Nule Gruppen; the collection of manuscripts relating to traditions and events of the country written by Michela Coloru, weaver and collaborator of the anthropologist. Furthermore, more than a thousand photographs taken in Nule and in other locations on the island are preserved. The materials were digitized, on behalf of the ISRE, by the anthropologist Cosimo Zene.

== Own works ==
- A. F. W. Bentzon, The Launeddas. A Sardinian folk music instrument (2 voll. Acta Musicologica Danica n° 1), Akademisk Forlag, Copenaghen, 1969
- A. F. W. Bentzon, Launeddas, Cagliari, 2002 ISBN 8888998004

== Literature ==
- Alberto Mario Cirese, Andrea Murru, Paolo Zedda, Unu de Danimarca. Il mondo poetico di Ortacesus nelle registrazioni e negli studi di Andreas Fridolin Weis Bentzon, con 2 CD Audio, Cagliari, 2006
- Cosimo Zene, Dialoghi Nulesi: Storia, memoria, identità di Nule (Sardegna) nell'antropologia di Andreas F. W. Bentzon, Nuoro, Edizioni ISRE, 2009, ISBN 978-88-96094-10-5, con una Postfazione di Giulio Angioni.
