= Three-Step Dance =

2003 drama film

- Directed by: Salvatore Mereu
- Screenplay by: Salvatore Mereu
- Produced by: Gianluca Arcopinto; Andrea Occhipinti
- Starring: Yael Abecassis; Caroline Ducey
- Cinematography: Renato Berta; Tommaso Borgstrom; Paolo Bravi; Nicolas Franick
- Edited by: Paola Freddi
- Music by: Gian Paolo Mele
- Release date: 2003
- Language: Italian

Three-Step Dance (Italian: Ballo a tre passi, also known as Three Steps Dancing) is a 2003 Italian drama film written and directed by Salvatore Mereu, in his feature film debut. It premiered at the 60th edition of the Venice Film Festival, in the Venice International Film Critics' Week sidebar, in which it was awarded best film. It also won the David di Donatello for best new director and the Ciak d'Oro for best first work.

== Cast ==
- Yael Abecassis as Francesca
- Caroline Ducey as Solveig
- Michele Carboni as Michele
- Daniele Casula as Andrea
- Gianpaolo Loddo as Giorgio
- Rossella Bergo as Palla
