= Music of Sardinia =

Folk music of the Italian island

Sardinia is probably the most culturally distinct of all the regions in Italy and, musically, is best known for the tenore polyphonic singing, sacred chants called gosos, the launeddas, an ancient instrument that consists of a set of three single-reed pipes, all three mouth-blown simultaneously using circular breathing, with two chanters and one drone and the cantu a chiterra, a monodic song that is accompanied by guitar, widespread mainly in the center and north of the island.

== Launeddas ==
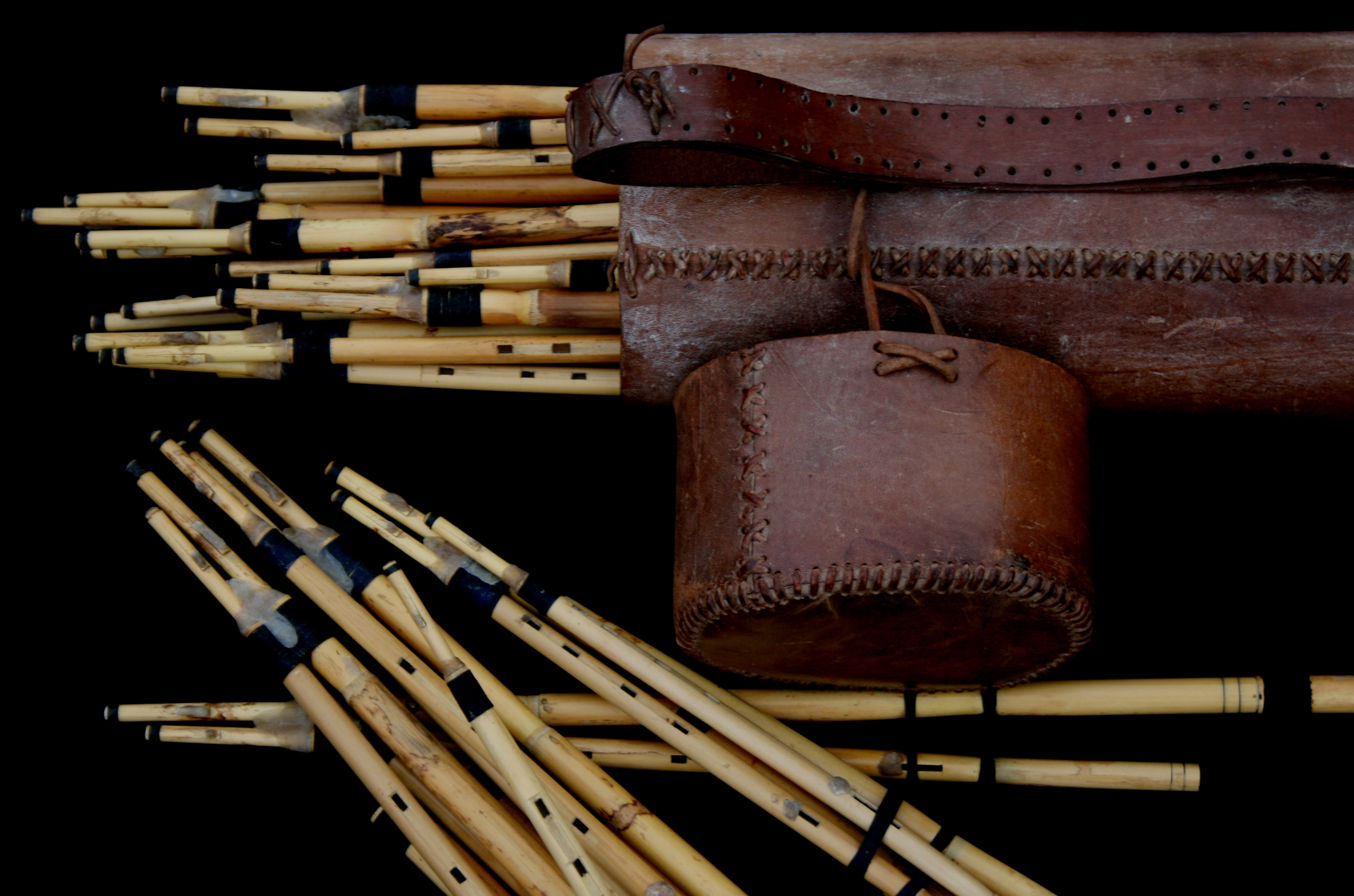
Different types of Launeddas

The launeddas are an ancient instrument, dating back to at least the 8th century BC. They are played using circular breathing. Launeddas are used to play a complex style of music that has achieved some international attention, and they are still played during religious ceremonies and dances (su ballu). Some of the most famous player were Efisio Melis, Antonio Lara, Dionigi Burranca and Luigi Lai. Many of the launeddas musicians are from the south of the island from villages like Villaputzu, San Vito and Muravera in the subregion named Sarrabus, or from Samatzai and even from Cabras near Oristano and Ovodda near Nuoro. Distinctively, they are played using extensive variations on a few melodic phrases and, because of the technique of circular breathing, a single song can last over an hour.

== Cantu a chiterra ==
Traditional singing accompanied by guitar cantu a chiterra is also found in Sardinia, represented by performers like Luiginu Cossu, Maria Carta, Anna Loddo, and nowadays Francesco Demuro; this genre is especially well known in the northwest region of Logudoro near the city of Sassari and in the northeast region of Gallura.

== Cantu a tenore (Polyphonic throat singing) ==
Rural polyphonic chanting known as cantu a tenore is sung with four vocal parts. They are bassu (bass), mesa boghe (middle), contra (counter) and boghe (leader and soloist). The most popular group is Tenores di Bitti; another one is Tenores de Oniferi. In November 2005, the A Tenore vocal style of the Sardinian pastoral culture was proclaimed a Masterpiece of the Oral and Intangible Heritage of Humanity by UNESCO. Interesting fact is that two voices of Cantu a Tenore choir have significant similarities with Tuvan Throat Singing (Khöömei), especially the voices of "bassu" and "contra", which are technically related to "kargyraa" and "korekteer".

== Other traditional singing, dance and music ==
Sacred gozos (in Sardinian language gosos), or sacred songs, can be heard during religious celebrations, one of the most famous song is the Deus ti salvet Maria ("God save you, Mary") also known as the Sardinian Hail Mary.

Traditional dances include su ballu tundu, su passu torrau, su durdurinu, su dillu, sa logudoresa, s'arroxiada , su passu e tres, and sa campidanesa.

Aside from the launeddas, traditional instruments include the benas, the organittu, the chiterra, and the tamburinos.

Other influential Sardinian musicians include Totore Chessa (organetto), 1930s launeddas legend Efisio Melis, Maria Carta, Anna Loddo, Mauro Palmas, Elena Ledda of Sonos and Suonofficina, Cordas et Cannas, Antonello Salis piano, Paolo Fresu (trumpet) and Gesuino Deiana (guitar).

== Musical and theatrical facilities ==
The modern Teatro Comunale of Cagliari is home to the permanent Choir and Orchestra of the Opera and Concert Association of Cagliari and seat of the Cagliari Opera Foundation. As well, there is a Roman amphitheater in Cagliari that is used for outdoor summer concerts and festivals. The city is the site of the Palestrina music conservatory.

The town of Tadasuni is the site of the interesting Giovanni Dore museum, a collection of 400 traditional Sardinian folk instruments. The Ente Musicale di Nuoro was founded in 1987 and, among other activities, sponsors the annual Nuoro Jazz Festival directed by trumpeter Paolo Fresu. Sassari is the site of the Luigi Canepa Music Conservatory, the Teatro Politeama Verdi, built in 1884; and the Civic Theatre (1827).

== Hymns and anthems ==
Su patriottu sardu a sos feudatarios ("The Sardinian Patriot to the Lords"), also known as Procurad'e moderare, barones, sa tirannia ("O barons! Make sure you temper [your] tyranny"), is the revolutionary anthem written in Sardinian language by Francesco Ignazio Mannu during the revolt occurred in 1794 all over the island against the feudalism, which culminated in the expulsion of the Piedmontese tyrants: the hymn had been translated in English by John Warre Tyndale in 1849, in French by A. Boullier in 1864 and in German by B. Schütze in 1979.

S'hymnu sardu nationale ("The Sardinian National Anthem") was the anthem of the Savoyard Kingdom of Sardinia (later to become the Kingdom of Italy); it was written in Sardinian by Vittorio Angius in 1842. It was replaced by the Marcia Reale (Royal March of Ordinance) in 1861.

Dimonios (Demons) is the official hymn of the Sassari Mechanized Brigade, written in Sardinian by Luciano Sechi in 1994.

== See also ==
- Ballu tundu
- Cantu a chiterra
- Cantu a tenore
- Launeddas
- Mutu

== Bibliography ==
- Diego Carpitella, Leonardo Sole, Pietro Sassu, La musica sarda, I-III ("Original Folk & Ethnic music of the Peoples of Europe"), Albatros VPA 8150-52, Milano, 1973.
- Marco Lutzu, Francesco Casu, Enciclopedia multimediale della musica sarda, 16 volumes, 9 DVD e 7 CD, Unione Sarda, Cagliari, 2012-2013
- Gerolama Carta Mantiglia - Antonio Tavera, Il ballo sardo: storia, identità e tradizione, Taranta, Firenze, 1999.
- (in Italian)Gavino Gabriel, Canti di Sardegna, Italica Ars, Milano, 1923.
- (in Italian) Paolo Mercurio, Dialogo del Canto a Tenore, de tenore cantu, Solinas, Nuoro, 2001.
- Paolo Mercurio, La Cultura delle Launeddas, vol. I, Solinas Edizioni, Nuoro, 2010
- Paolo Mercurio, Introduzione alla Musica Sarda, Milano, 2014,ISBN 978-88-6885-013-5
- (in Italian)Francesco Giannattasio - Bernard Lortat-Jacob, Modalità di improvvisazione nella musica sarda, «Culture musicali» 1: 3-36, 1982.
- (in Italian)Manuela Gualerzi, Discografia della musica popolare sarda a 78 rpm (1922-1959), «Culture musicali» 2: 167-192, 1982.
- (in French)Bernard Lortat-Jacob, Improvisation et modèle: le chant a guitare sarde, in «L'Homme», XXIV, 1, 1984.
- (in French) Bernard Lortat-Jacob, En accord. Polyphonies de Sardaigne: quatre voix qui n'en font qu'une, in «Cahiers de musique traditionnelles», VI, 69-86, 1993.
- Andreas Fridolin Weis Bentzon, The launeddas. A Sardinian folk-music instrument (2 voll. Acta Musicologica Danica n°1), Akademisk Forlag, Copenhagen, 1969
- A. F. W. Bentzon, Launeddas, Cagliari, 2002 ISBN 88-88998-00-4
- Paul Vernon, Ethnic and Vernacular Music, 1898 - 1960; A resource and guide to recordings, Greenwood Press Westport, CT- London, 1995.
- Surian, Alessio. "Tenores and Tarantellas". 2000. In Broughton, Simon and Ellingham, Mark with McConnachie, James and Duane, Orla (Ed.), World Music, Vol. 1: Africa, Europe and the Middle East, pp. 189 – 201
- Guide Cultura, i luoghi della musica (2003), ed. Touring Club Italiano.
