= Piffero =

Double-reed musical instrument

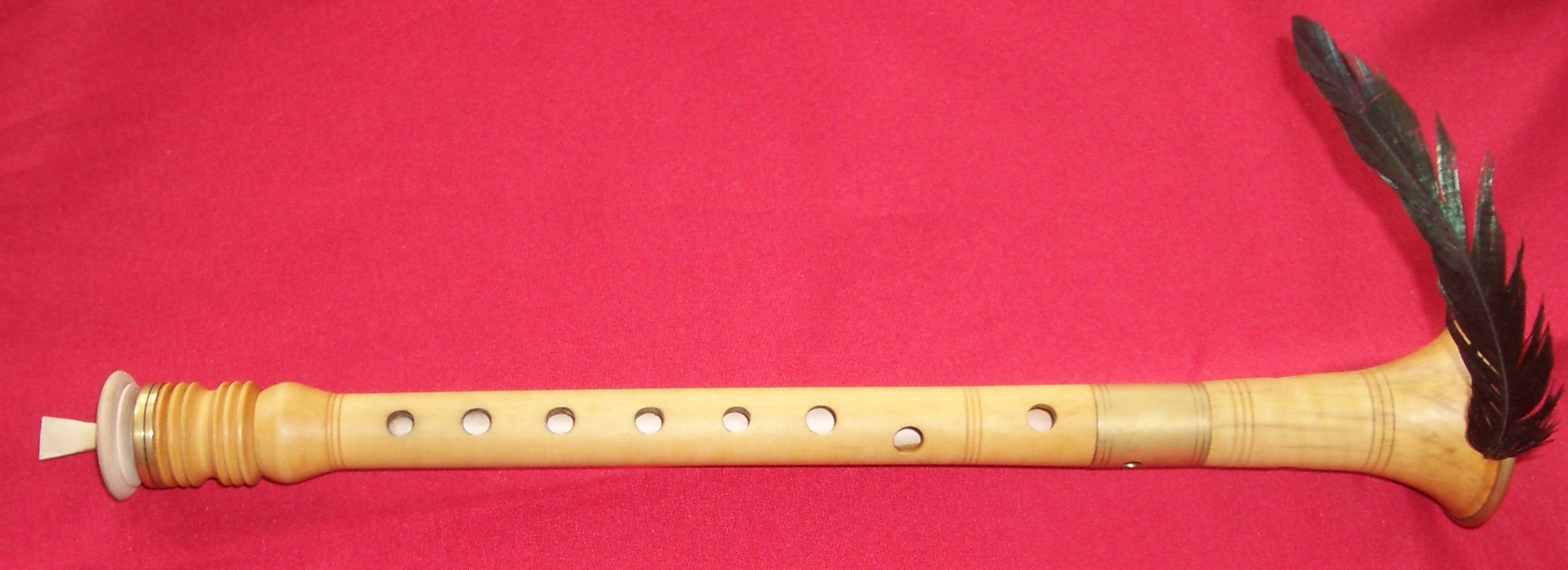
Piffero

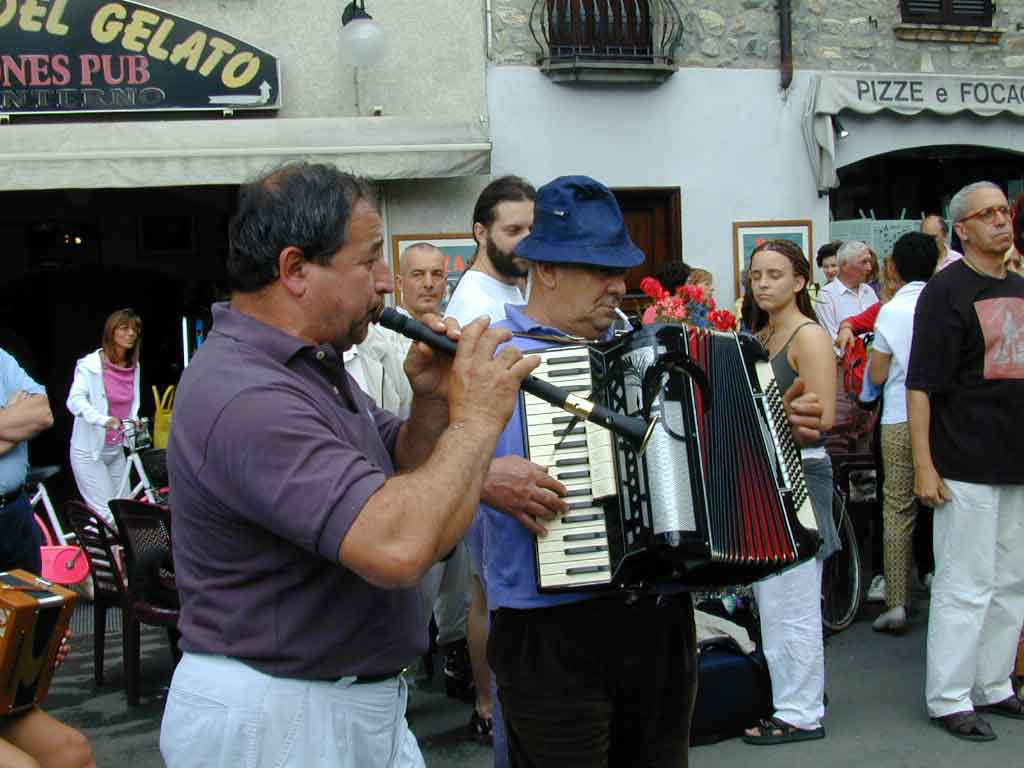
Ettore Losini playing the piffero in Bobbio, near Piacenza, Emilia-Romagna, Italy

The piffero (Italian: [ˈpiffero]) or piffaro is a double-reed musical instrument of the oboe family with a conical bore (Sachs-Hornbostel category 422.112). It is used to play music in the tradition of the Quattro Province, an area of mountains and valleys in the north-west Italian Apennines which includes parts of the four provinces of Alessandria, Genoa, Piacenza and Pavia. It is also played throughout Southern Italy with different fingering styles dictated by local tradition.

The instrument is a descendant of the Medieval shawm and belongs to the family of the bombarde.

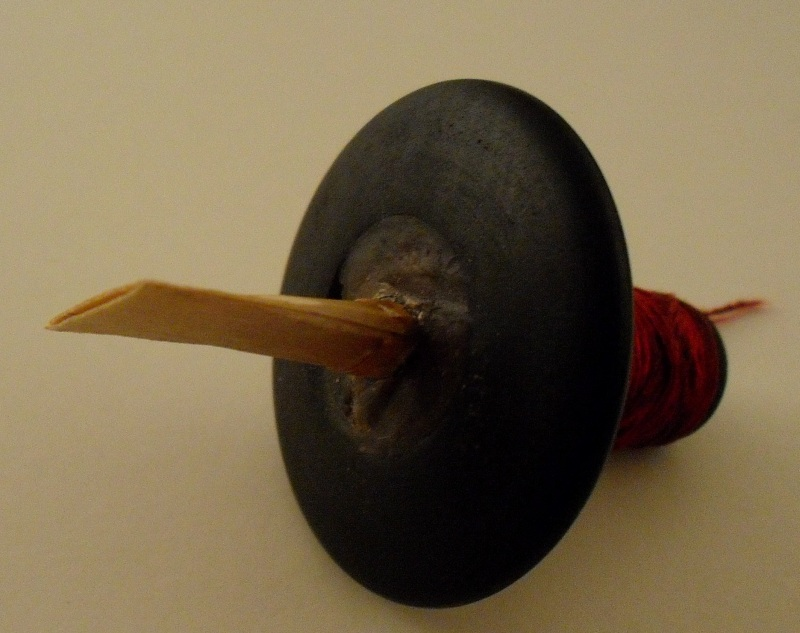
Mouthpiece (ital. musotto)

The reed used by the piffero is inserted in a conical brass tube, which is itself inserted in a pirouette. This peculiarity, which is shared with oriental and ancient oboes, is unique in Italy.

The piffero has eight tone holes, one of which, on the back of the instrument, is usually covered by the left-hand thumb, and ends with a bell, where a cock tail feather (used to clean the reed) typically rests during execution.

Traditionally in Northern Italy it was accompanied by an Apennine bagpipe known as the müsa. In the early-20th century the müsa was largely displaced by the accordion, which musicians found in some ways more versatile. However, towards the end of the twentieth century the bagpipes made a comeback, and today the piffero is commonly accompanied by either of these instruments, or by both.

Other regional names for the piffero in Southern Italy are "ciaramella" or "pipita". It is still commonly played in accompaniment with the Southern Italian Zampogna, an instrument which itself is essentially a series of pifferos stuck into a common stock and supplied with air through the use of a goat-skin bag.

Related to the piffero is a larger Sicilian instrument known as the bifora, or pifara.

Italian-speakers refer to the player of a piffero as a pifferaio or as a pifferaro.

== Other uses of the term piffero ==
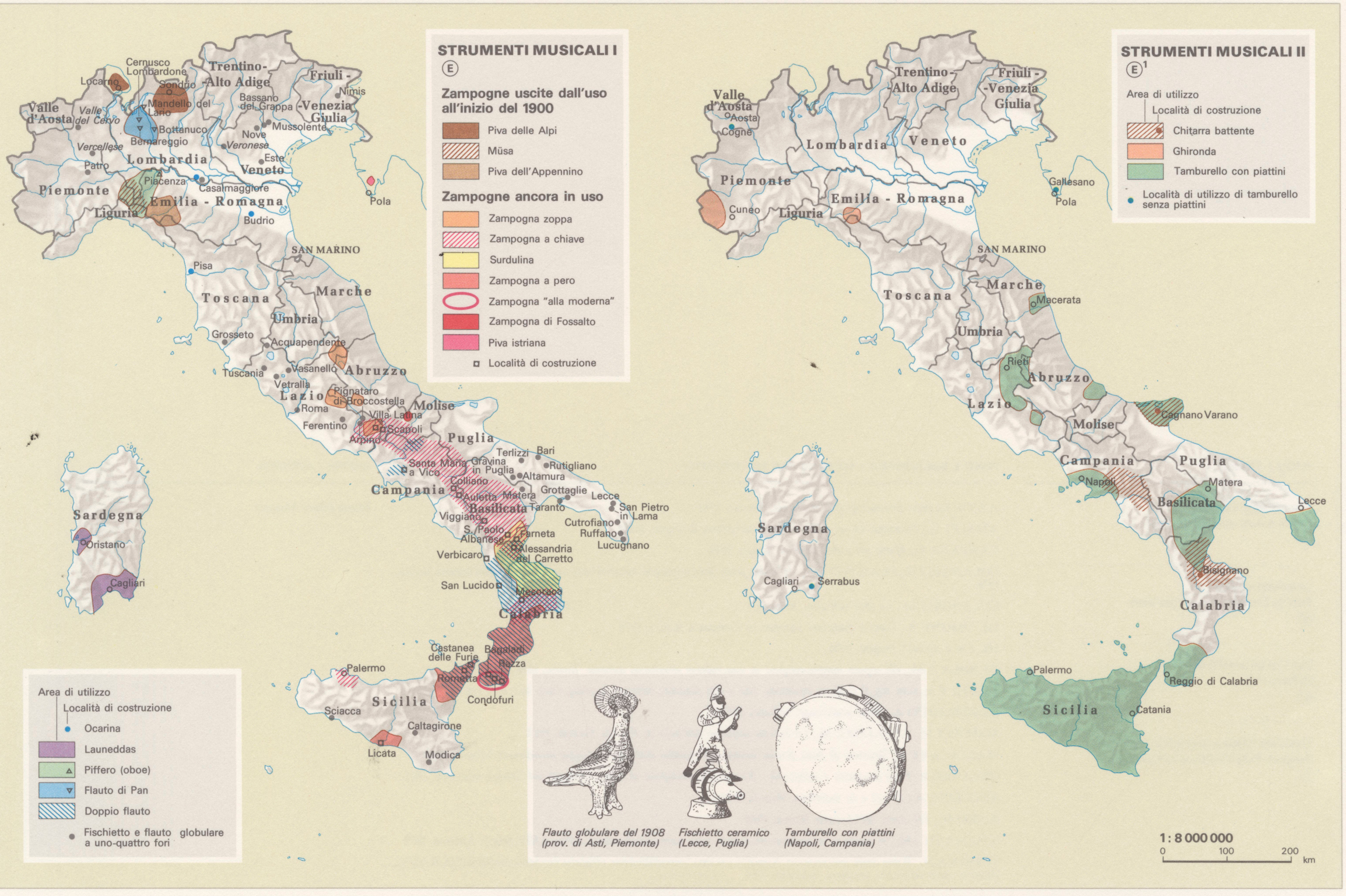
Map folk musical instruments in Italy

Piffero is sometimes used as the name of an organ stop which emulates the sound of members of the shawm family; while Piffaro (or: Fiffaro) is the name of an organ stop, also known as Voce Umana, whose sound resembles a vibrato transverse flute.

The Italian word piffero can also refer to the fife, as in Michael Haydn's Symphony in C major, Perger 10 (Sherman, MH 188, Symphony No. 18), which calls for pifferi.

Piffaro is also the name of a performing group in the US specializing in Renaissance music.
