= Efisio Melis =

Sardinian folk musician (1890–1970)

Efisio Melis (1890–1970) was a Sardinian folk musician, and noted to have been one of the greatest launeddas players in the world.

He was born in Villaputzu near the southeastern tip of the island of Sardinia, the same town of fellow noted launeddas player Antonio Lara. Melis was a child prodigy, performing in public at the age of eleven. His career fell into decline in the 1920s, but revived in the mid-1930s when he made a number of recordings on the launeddas that have since been reissued and serve as important documentation of his skill. He was praised by the Danish musicologist, Andreas Fridolin Weis Bentzon, as having a talent comparable to that of Bach and Mozart (cited in Leydi, 1990). His life ended in Cagliari.

== See also ==
Music of Sardinia
