= Salvatore Mereu =

Italian film director (born 1965)

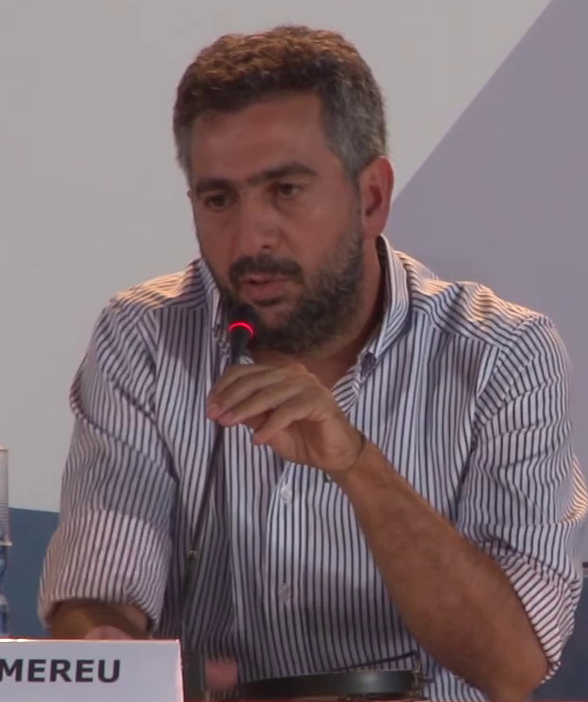
- Mereu at the 2012 Venice Film Festival
- Born: 17 March 1965 (age 61); Dorgali, Italy
- Occupation: Film director

Salvatore Mereu (born 17 March 1965) is an Italian film director and screenwriter.

== Life and career ==
Born in Dorgali, Mereu studied at the DAMS (Disciplines of Arts, Music, and Entertainment) department at the University of Bologna, and later at the Centro Sperimentale di Cinematografia in Rome.

In 2003, he made his feature film debut with Three-Step Dance, which was awarded best film of the Venice International Film Critics' Week at the 60th Venice International Film Festival and got him the David di Donatello for best new director and the Ciak d'Oro for best first work. His second feature Sonetàula premiered at the 58th Berlin International Film Festival, in the Panorama sidebar.

In 2012, he directed Bellas Mariposas, which had its world premiere at the 69th Venice International Film Festival. The film won the Big Screen Award at the 42nd International Film Festival Rotterdam. In 2020, his film Assandira premiered out of competition at the 77th Venice International Film Festival. It was nominated for a Nastro d'Argento for best film. His 2022 film Bentu premiered at the 79th Venice International Film Festival, in the Giornate degli Autori sidebar.

== Filmography ==
- Three-Step Dance (2003)
- Sonetàula (2008)
- Bellas Mariposas (2012)
- Assandira (2020)
- Bentu (2022)
- The Dog Is My Dog (short, 2025)
- Wandering Trees (2026)
