= Marty Maggio =

American musician

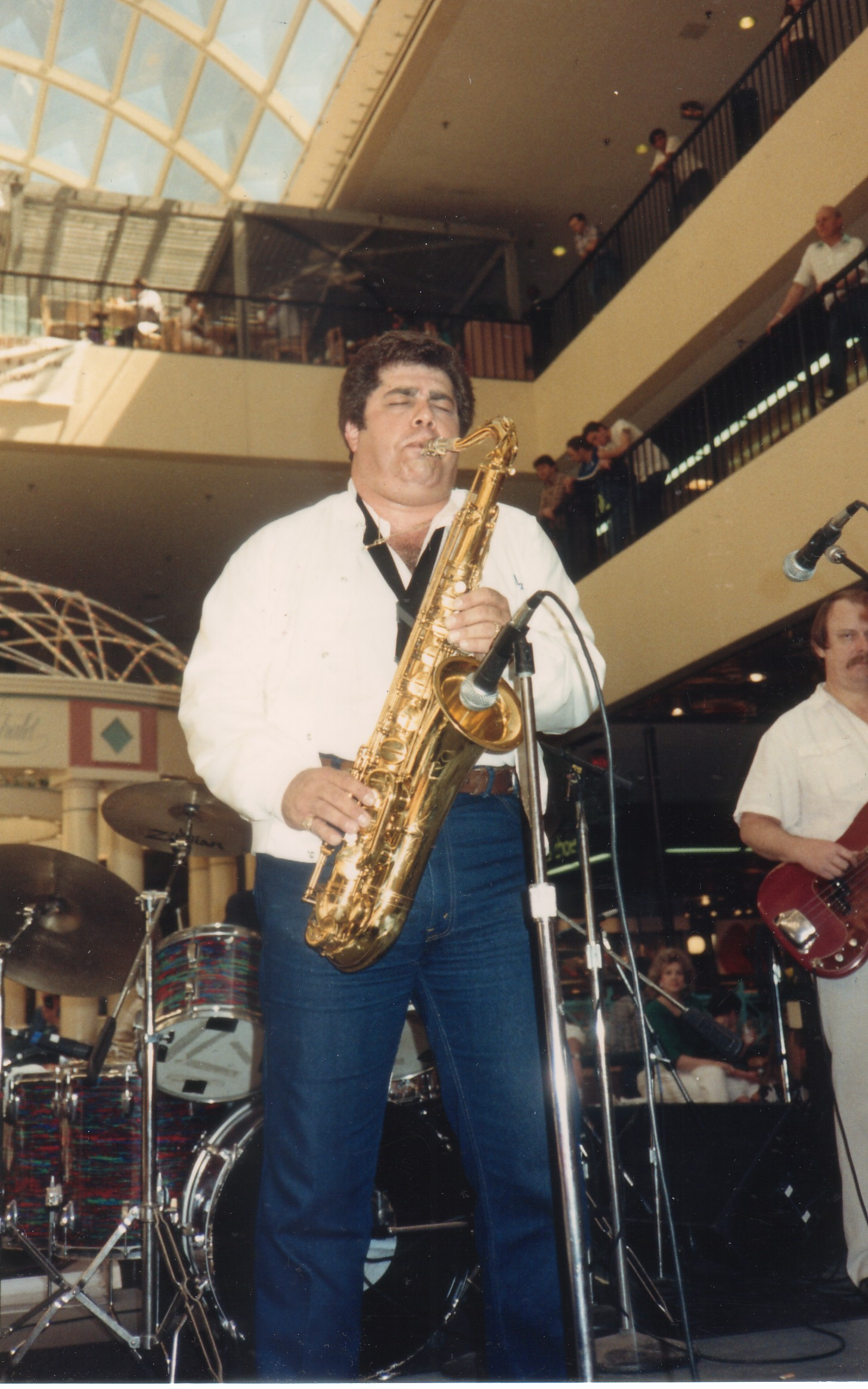
Maggio playing live in Houston, mid-1990s

Martin Anthony Maggio (October 29, 1949 – April 25, 2011) was an American musician best known for his legendary Saxophone playing. His playing was compared to that of the late Boots Randolph yet some people say his version of “Yackety Sax” was even better than Boots.

== Biography ==
Maggio was born in Houston, Texas and raised there as well attending high school at Jeff Davis High School.

When Marty was just a child his mother Ann Maggio would trade her spaghetti to Marty's music teacher Michael Spompanato for clarinet lessons. Soon after Marty turned his attention to the Saxophone and that was it. At age 16 Marty joined his first band called the PerryMates, headed by Clarence Perry. While with the PerryMates Marty and the band hooked up with Roy Orbison and they even auditioned at Orbison's house. He hired them and they toured with him for some time.

After Marty finally parted with PerryMates and Roy Orbison he ended up recording some tracks with the Nashville Horns and Elvis Presley. Marty's main work with Elvis was playing backup on his I washed my Hands in Muddy Water track.

Marty's next big run in was when he realized a friend of his by the name of Richard Kemp knew Boots Randolph well. Richard hooked up Marty and Boots and it was magic. When Boots heard how good Marty's version of “Yackety Sax” was he then invited Marty up on stage to play with him. Together they did a double sax version of the song and this was said to be the first time Boots ever invited another sax player to play with him.

Next Marty hooked up with another Nashville musician by the name of Jim Vest, leader of the Nashville Cats. Marty started with the Cats in 1972 and was involved in more recording sessions. In 1976 Marty decided to return to Houston and get back into circulation in his hometown. Marty cut about half a dozen cd's such as Sax Tradition, Simple things, Jump Jives and Wail and his newest release “YES” Country which was released just months before his death. Marty was also said to be in negotiations to play Sax on American Idol performer John Wayne Shultz album,

On April 25, 2011, at 61 years of age Marty unexpectedly died of a possible heart attack.
