= Francesco Demuro =

Italian operatic tenor

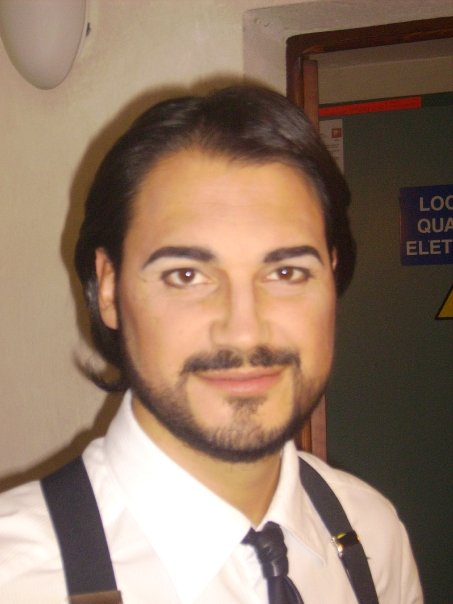
- Born: January 6, 1978 (age 48); Porto Torres
- Occupation: Operatic tenor

Francesco Demuro (born 6 January 1978), is an Italian operatic tenor who made an international career.

== Life and career ==
Demuro was born in Porto Torres, Sardinia. By the age of ten, Demuro made his first stage appearance, and by the age of twelve, he had joined the Minicantadores, a group of young singers of traditional Sardinian songs in the genre known as cantu a chiterra of which he became a leading representative.

He later studied in Cagliari under Elisabetta Scano, and made his opera debut in the role of Rodolfo in Verdi's Luisa Miller at the Teatro Regio in Parma in October 2007.

In 2008 he appeared as the Duke of Mantua in Verdi's Rigoletto at the Verdi Festival in Parma, as well as in Dresden, Hong Kong, at the Teatro Regio in Turin. He performed in Verdi's Simon Boccanegra in Athens, and as Rodolfo in Puccini's La bohème in Bari and Sassari.

In 2009, he made his debut as Nemorino in Donizetti's L'elisir d'amore at the in Teatro Filarmonico di Verona and also appeared in the opera at La Scala in Milan the following year. His US debut took place as Alfredo in Verdi's La traviata with the Seattle Opera in the McCaw Hall opera house. In December 2009 " Lucia di Lammermoor" in Sassari.

In 2010 he appeared at Suntory Hall in Tokyo in Mozart's Così fan tutte, in Donizetti's Lucia di Lammermoor in Hamburg, another La traviata and Der Rosenkavalier by R. Strauss in Dresden and also at the Wiener Staatsoper. He was featured in La bohème in Detroit and at the Wiener Staatsoper, in Donizetti's Maria Stuarda in Athens, another Elixir, and a new production of Rigoletto at Wiener Festwochen conducted by Omer Meir Wellber and directed by Luc Bondy.

In 2011 Demuro repeated of Alfredo at the Arena di Verona, where he received enthusiastic reviews. His debut at the Royal Opera House as Rinuccio in Gianni Schicchi, conducted by Antonio Pappano, was a success.

Over the 2012/13 season, he appeared in a variety of new roles, including Nemorino in Donizetti's Don Pasquale at the Théâtre des Champs-Élysées, in Verdi's Macbeth in Munich, and as Fenton in Verdi's Falstaff at La Scala. In addition, he reprised some roles which included another Duke of Mantua at the San Francisco Opera, Alfredos at the Berlin State Opers, the Wiener Staatsoper, and the Oper Frankfurt, and as the Rodolfo for the Seattle Opera.

Other appearances included those in Maria Stuarda staged by the ABAO-OLBE company in Bilbao in April 2013, another Così in San Francisco in June 2013, as Roméo in Gounod's Roméo et Juliette in the Arena di Verona, and as Fenton in San Francisco's Falstaff.

Demuro appeared as the Duke of Mantua in January 2014 in Seattle, another Alfredo at the Opéra Bastille, as well as appearances with the Metropolitan Opera and Covent Garden.

=== Personal life ===
Demuro lives in Lucca with his wife Vittoria Contini and their daughters. He has retained his strong connection to Sardinia, where he spends holidays and performs Sardinian folk songs in popular festivals.
