= Tenores di Bitti =

Vocal style from Bitti, Sardinia, Italy

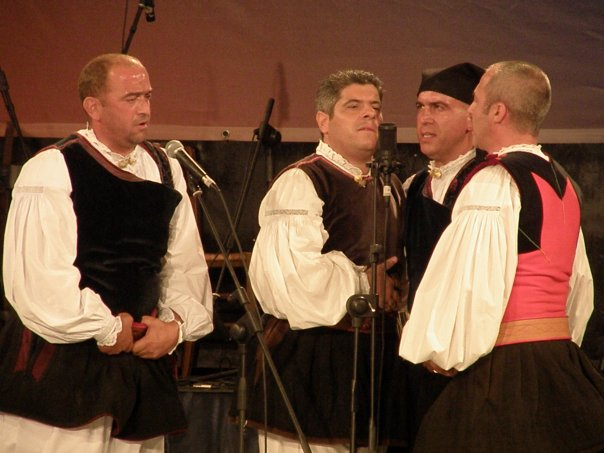
Tenores di Bitti "Mialinu Pira"

The Tenore di Bitti is a traditional folk music group from Bitti, Sardinia who employs a polyphonic vocal style, often described as a type of overtone singing, whose oral tradition dates back to 3000 BC.

The Tenore di Bitti is considered one of the best and most traditional groups in Sardinia. This group of voices extemporizes or performs poems with each singer taking one of four parts: boke, bassu, contra, mesu oke. Boke is the soloist and provides melody, bassu is the root and provides the tonic, contra provides the fifth, and mesu oke provides the octave above the fifth, filling out a chord in just intonation. There are in Bitti several "a tenore" groups and the most famous is Tenore di Bitti Mialinu Pira and Tenore di Bitti remunnu 'e Locu. Piero Sanna and Daniele Cossellu alternate boke and mesa 'oke on different songs while on all songs Tancredi Tucconi and Mario Pira take contra and bassu respectively.

Their album S'amore 'e mama includes the ambient noises of the various recording locations in Bitti including churches, streets, canteens, bars, countryside, and "nuraghe".

== Recordings ==
- Tenores di Bitti Remunnu 'e Locu: S'amore 'e mama ["Mother's Love"]. Real World.
- Tenores di Bitti "Mialinu Pira": Su monte 'e mesus. RBS 1998

Ballu Seriu starts with single voices (Oche, Bassu, Contra, Mesu Oche)
Tenores di Bitti Mialinu Pira Live recording in Modena, June 2011
