= Trallalero =

Italian polyphonic folk music

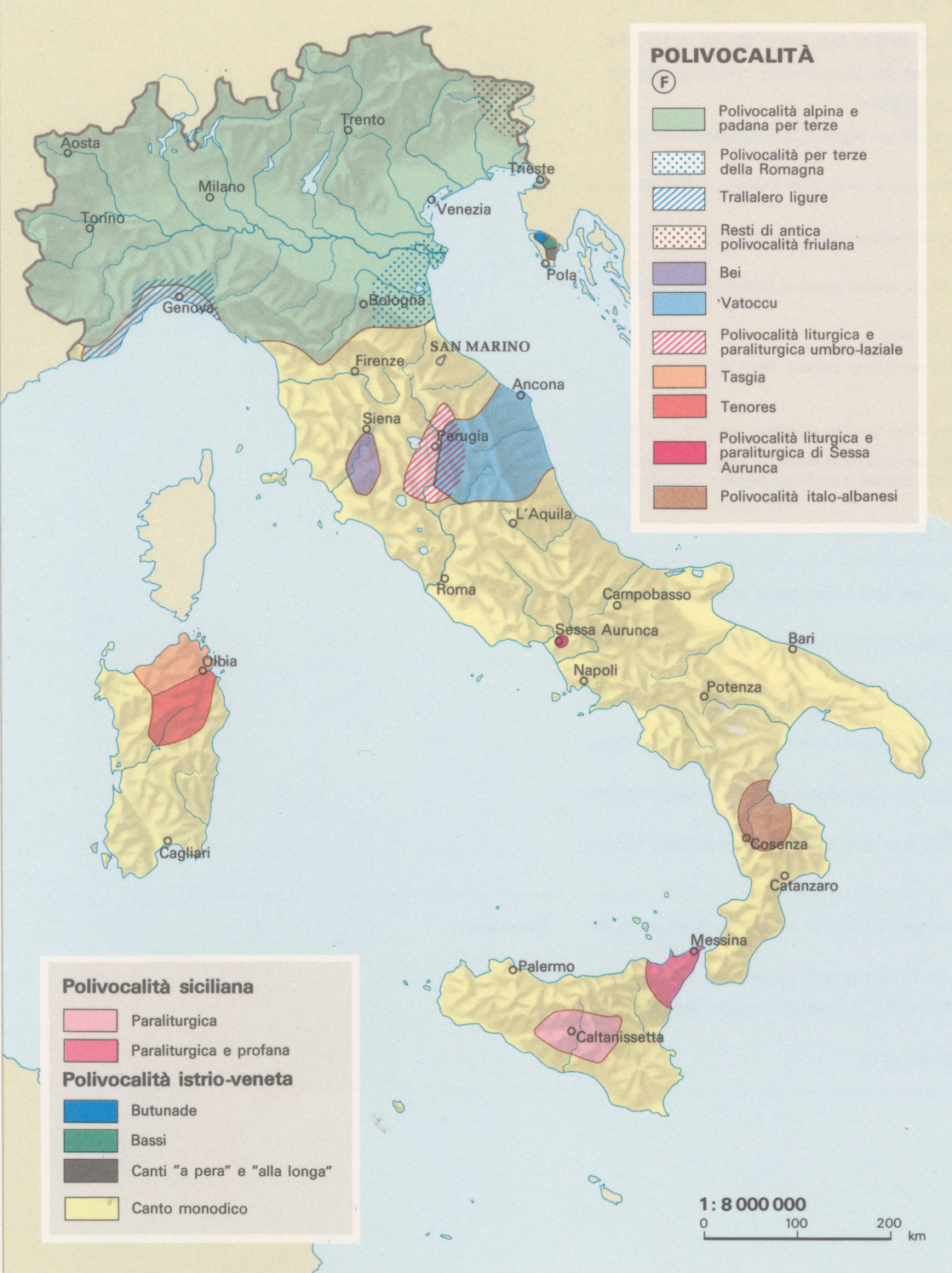
Map of polyphonic folk singing in Italy

Trallalero is a kind of polyphonic folk music from the Ligurian region of Genoa, in northern Italy. It is traditionally performed by men, though there have been some female performers in the modern era. The name derives from the monosyllabic vocables (non-lexical vocalizations), tra-la-le-ro, which feature heavily in the repertoire of the groups or Squadre. These are typically sections of songs without words during which the melody is sung on nonsense syllables.

In the 1950s, American musicologist Alan Lomax and Diego Carpitella recorded trallalero. Lomax later claimed he was blown away, and called it the most significant work in his long and storied career. Edward Neill worked to revitalize the tradition in the middle of the 20th century, with a wide range of works by musicologist Mauro Balma making up the majority of modern academic study on the subject.

Trallalero groups consist of tenor, baritone and bass parts, accompanied by a contralto and a singer whose voice imitates a guitar (chitarra). As the names of parts suggest, the imitation of instrumental styles replaces traditional vocal polyphony: this is a distinguishing feature of this genre. Nine singers are considered a normal line-up: one each of chitarra, tenor, contralto, baritone and five basses, although sometimes groups can be significantly larger.

In these larger groups basses are often divides into three sections: the bassi profondi or 'deep basses' who are usually limited to the long sounds or drones, the bassi altior 'high basses' who are similar to the deep basses but, as the name suggests, sing a slightly higher melody during certain sections of the songs, and the 'bassi cantabili' or 'singable basses' who typically sing a higher, more complex melody and often provide a rhythmic counterpoint to the other bass parts.

Group harmony in Liguria is historically associated with mountain villages, where two voices (usually a tenor and a baritone) sung over accompaniment by bass or drone. A repertoire of traditional songs evolved over time, and the style moved to the docks of Genoa, a noted port city. There, metal-workers, longshoremen and stevedores sang Trallalero, with the practice peaking in the first three decades of the 20th century. Some Trallalero groups are still practicing in Genoa and Liguria, and can be usually seen performing at the annual Le vie dei canti festival in the winter months.
