= Gosos =

The gosos or goccius (Sardinian) or goigs (Catalan) are a kind of devotional and paraliturgical songs sang pertaining to the folk tradition that are dedicated to the Virgin Mary, Jesus Christ, or a saint. They are typical of the Catalan Countries and Sardinia, and written in the Catalan, Sardinian or Spanish languages. They are sung during religious ceremonies, processions, pilgrimages and the votive festivals.

== Etymology ==
=== Catalan ===
In Catalan, goigs means "joys", from the Latin gaudium, meaning "joy" or "delight". The term comes from the origin of these songs, which celebrated the Seven Joys of the Virgin. Thus, the word is always used in plural, even when referring to a single composition.

=== Sardinian ===
The term gosos and its varieties (gotzos, cotzos, and gosi in Gallurese) used in the central-northern part of Sardinia derive from the Castilian gozos, (Note: For the original use, see: • de San Antonio, J. (1742). Novena del glorioso principe y sagrado arcangel San Rafael, médico y medicina de los dolientes, guía y defensor de los caminantes, abogado y protector de los pretendientes, consuelo y alivio de los afligidos (in Spanish). por la viuda de Miguel de Ortega. • Sánchez, T.A.; Pidal, P.J.; Janer, F. (1864). Poetas castellanos anteriores al siglo XV. Biblioteca de autores espanoles desde la formacion del lenguaje hasta nuestros dias (in Spanish). M. Rivadeneyra.) whereas in southern Sardinia the varieties goggius, goccius, and coggius derive from the Catalan goigs, which has been kept as such in the city of Alghero. Both gozos and goigs seem to originate in turn from the Latin gaudium. Sergio Bullegas, to whom the gosos seem to constitute "an hagiographic genre of dramatic kind", stresses the "clear influence of the Hispano-Catalan culture" and the "rather close linguistic relationship with the goigs."

Fragment of a popular goig to the Holy Chalice sung in Valencia Cathedral

A minor denomination comes from the Catalan cobla (strophe), called gròbbes or cròbbes, which also comprise some other genres related to the improvised poetry in some areas around Nuoro, and especially where the conventional boundaries of the Logudorese and Campidanese dialects merge.

== The Catalan goigs ==
Goigs evolved from the liturgical songs sung during the period of formation of Romance languages, and in their origin they were exclusively dedicated to the Virgin Mary. In the 12th century, literature written in Latin already has poems that praise Mary's Joys (gaudia). Starting on the 14th century, it became popular to write them in honour of other saints, at the same time that goigs acquired a prominent role in folk culture that kept increasing in the following centuries.

The earliest written document that mentions goigs in this sense is the Chronicle of Muntaner, a text written between the years 1325 and 1328 narrating the events since the birth of king James I of Catalonia-Aragon until the coronation of king Alphonse IV. This chronicle explains that the whole Catalan army was singing goigs to Saint Peter, asking him to make it rain on the day before attacking Gallipoli. Guilds and confraternities popularized goigs to their respective patron saints.

The oldest known goigs in Catalan is considered to be the Ballada dels goyts de nostre dona en vulgar cathallan a ball redo, (meaning "Dancing of the goigs of Our Lady in Vulgar Catalan in ball rodó" in Medieval Catalan, where ball rodó was a popular form of dancing and "vulgar" refers to a vehicular language that is not Latin), preserved in the manuscript of the Red Book of Montserrat, written in the late 14th century, and which shows the relation of goigs and dancing inside churches before the Council of Trent. However, an earlier manuscript known as Ms. 486 kept in Catalonia's National Archive titled Flor de lir e de gog e de legranssa is considered older than the Red Book of Montserrat.

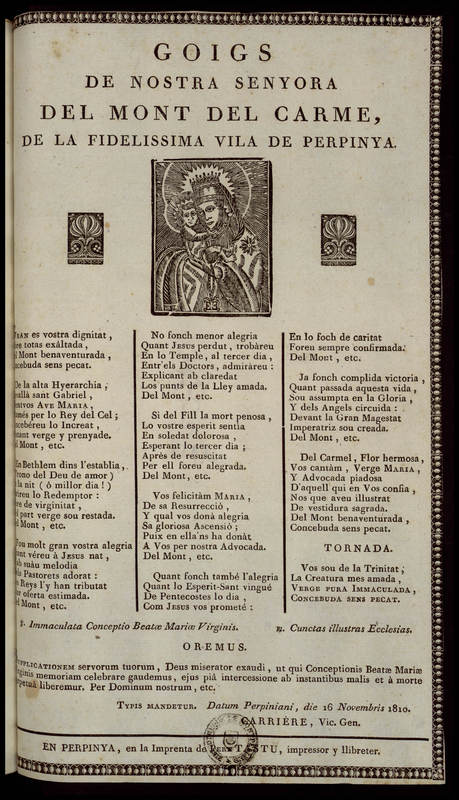
Goigs to Our Lady of Mount Carmel, printed in 1810 in Perpinyà (Northern Catalonia) in the Catalan language.

Though goigs have existed in Catalonia as manuscripts since at least the 14th century, printing them did not become generalized until the 17th century. Their graphic composition has not changed much through the centuries, and they are still printed to look virtually the same as in the 17th century: a page of approximately 30x20 cm where the text is printed in two or three columns, an image of the religious figure being worshipped in the centre, and a decorative frame around the page. They might include the musical notation at the bottom of the page. The melodies are simple and often based on repetitive structures. In the 19th century, bibliophiles and collectors searched for printed goigs, giving more importance to their aesthetic value than to their religious character.

This genre has been cultivated for centuries in Catalan culture without interruption until the present day. There is no chapel, parochial church or hermitage that does not have -or has not had until recently- their own printed goigs sung in the local festivity day.

== The gosos in Sardinia ==
The gosos include religious pieces of music in the Sardinian language and all its dialects, following a rhyme scheme based on the octave, sestina and quintain.

According to the scholar Giovanni Dore, the roots of the Sardinian gosos actually lie in the Byzantine models: they are in fact identical to the Greek kontakion in terms of the metre structure and the strophes with the chorus at the end. It is also known from the De cerimoniis aulae Byzantinae that the protospatharios Torchitorio I, in honor of the Emperor Constantine VII Porphyrogenitus, sent a delegation of Sardinians who sang a peculiar Greek hymn in Constantinople. Some other authors think that the gosos derive from the Italian lauda, which made its way to Sardinia and the other regions of Europe thanks to Saint Francis' spiritual influence; it has also been theorised that the gosos style of singing might actually be of autochthonous origin, with sonorities typical of the ancient Mediterranean region.

Starting from the 14th century, the gosos were already mentioned as a fundamental part of the novenas; while Sardinian was still retained in the 15th century, the Spanish language overall prevailed. A temporary halt is attested when the Spanish Inquisition operated, but the genre of religious drama spread on the island in the 17th century, and the gosos were an integral part of such rituals.

Philip IV imposed a ban on theatrical performances in 1649; however, the tradition in Sardinia was kept alive and, from the 18th century onwards, manuscripts documenting the gosos in Sardinian became widespread and were soon handed out to all the local communities. Some pieces written in Spanish have also been saved, such as the one in the parish of Sedilo by Jaime Zonquelo Espada, who composed the Gosos de la Virgen de la Piedad in 1734.

They became the subject of censorship again in 1763, when the archbishop of Sassari Giulio Cesare Viancini forbade the gosos in favour of a sterner style (the prelate had favourable views towards Jansenism). These popular Sardinian chants were forbidden once more in 1924, when the Concilio Plenario Sardo (Plenary Council of Sardinia) congregated at the Santa Giusta Cathedral in Oristano and put a ban on this kind of singing. The following years also saw the gosos being declared illegal, in accordance with a series of policies that favoured cultural assimilation to Italian and discouraged the use of the non-Italian dialects and languages, Sardinian included. (Note: For details on the 1924 Concilio Plenario Sardo, see "Lettera degli Arcivescovi e Vescovi di Sardegna al loro Clero e Popolo", 31 May 1924 in Monitore Ufficiale dell'Episcopato Sardo, pp. 47– ff.)

== Collections ==
=== In Catalonia ===
In Catalonia, there is a significant tradition of collecting goigs since the 19th century, often linked to the Renaixença movement. Famous collectors include the poet and priest Jacint Verdaguer, the poet and linguist Marià Aguiló and the philologist Milà i Fontanals. One of the greatest goigs collectionists was Salvador Roca i Ballvé, who collected 21,927 compositions from the 17th to the 19th centuries. His collection was acquired by the Library of Catalonia in 1936. The Library has continued receiving donations and buying collections, and nowadays it preserves more than 30,000 Catalan goigs. Many other local archives and libraries have their own set collection of goigs, being particularly important those in the Episcopal Public Library of Barcelona, the Library of Montserrat, the Historical Archive of the City of Barcelona. Outside of Catalonia, the Vallat collection in the Montpellier library includes several thousands goigs.

There are also associations around Catalonia that collect and popularize goigs. The oldest association dedicated to this is Amics dels Goigs, founded in 1921 by Francesc de P. Baldelló. Amics dels Goigs has about 600 members. It publishes a trimestral journal, celebrates an annual conference circle, and funds the publication of goigs.

=== In Sardinia ===
The most ancient gosos text known is the collection of the Laudes a sa Rejna de sa Rosa. Grazia Deledda has documented some gosos in a chapter of her work Tradizioni popolari di Nuoro (transl. Popular traditions of Nuoro), as they were reported to her in the prolific collector Giuseppe Ferraro's work Canti popolari in dialetto logudorese. Said collection by Ferraro has 37 gosos transcribed, some of them being reported in the single local varieties, and all of them reporting the name of whoever collected them first.

In 2004, the diocese of Nuoro released a collection of gosos edited by the priests Giovanni Carta and Pietro Muggianu, with one hundred or so gosos that were scattered across the various parishes of central Sardinia.

== See also ==
- Music of Sardinia
- Titles of Mary
- Seven Joys of the Virgin
