= Bifora (musical instrument) =

Traditional Sicilian wind instrument

The bifora or pifara was a Sicilian double reed instrument of the oboe family, related to the ancient shawm and particularly to the piffero of the northern Italian Apennines. Much larger than the piffero, and made in one piece, it was employed together with drums in ceremonial processions, particularly in the town of San Marco d'Alunzio in the province of Messina. Its use seems to have died out during the twentieth century.
