= Maggio drammatico =

Medieval musical and dramatic rituals at planting time in central Italy

Literally, "plays of May" the Maggio drammatico refers to medieval musical and dramatic rituals at planting time in central Italy, typical of many agrarian societies. Their origins, however, are certainly prehistoric. In the case of these central Italian rituals, the combination of song, text and drama has been speculated to be one of the origins of Italian opera, born in the workshops of the Florentine Camerata.
