= Cantu a tenore =

Folk singing style from Sardinia, Italy

Cantu a tenòre
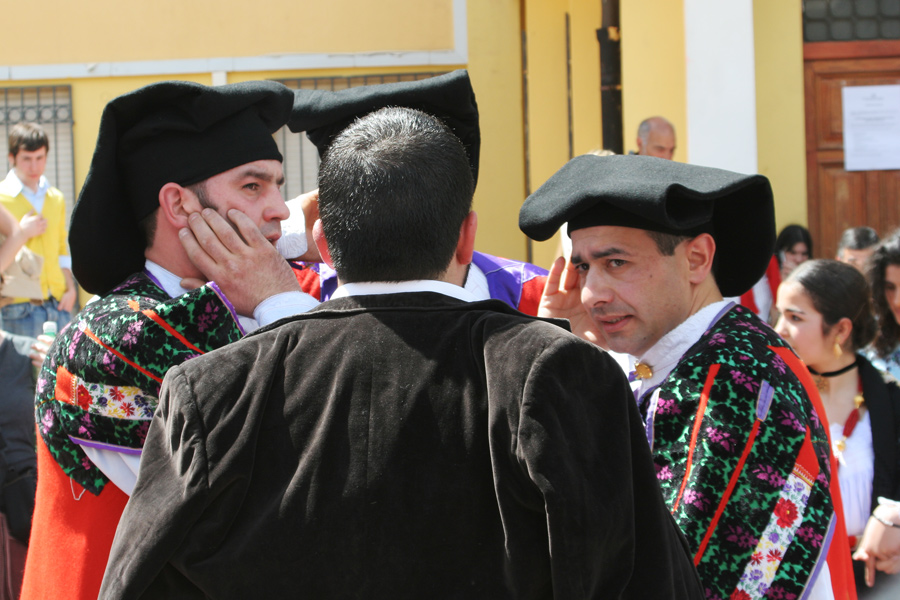
- Canto a tenore in Oliena, Sardinia
- Stylistic origins: Sardinian music
- Typical instruments: Human voice

Local scenes
- Sardinia

Canto a tenore, Sardinian pastoral songs
- UNESCO Intangible Cultural Heritage
- Country: Italy
- Reference: 00165
- Region: Europe and North America

Inscription history
- Inscription: 2008 (3rd session)
- List: Representative

The cantu a tenòre (Sardinian: su tenòre, su cuncòrdu, su cuntràttu, su cussèrtu, s'agorropamèntu, su cantu a pròa; Italian: canto a tenore) is a style of polyphonic folk singing characteristic of the island of Sardinia (Italy's second largest island), particularly the region of Barbagia, though some other Sardinian sub-regions bear examples of such tradition.

In 2005, UNESCO proclaimed the cantu a tenore to be an example of intangible cultural heritage.

== Etymology ==
The word tenore is not to be confused with the word "tenor" as a simple description of vocal register; it refers to the actual style of folk singing and is distinguished from other similar styles called by different names in different places on the island, such as taja in Gallura and concordu in Logudoro (Sassu 1978).

In the Barbagia region on the island of Sardinia, there are two different styles of polyphonic singing: cuncordu, usually a form of sacred music, sung with regular voices, and tenore, usually a form of profane music, marked by the use of overtone singing.

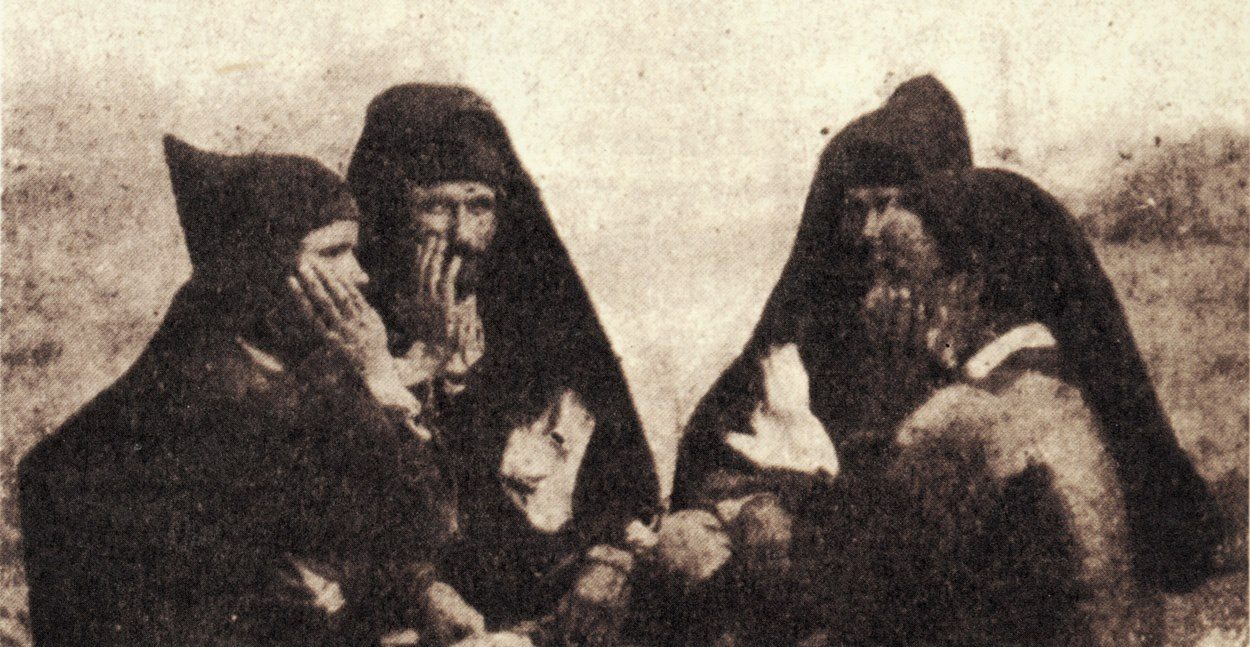
Singers from Nuoro (Nùgoro) in 1903.

== Technique ==
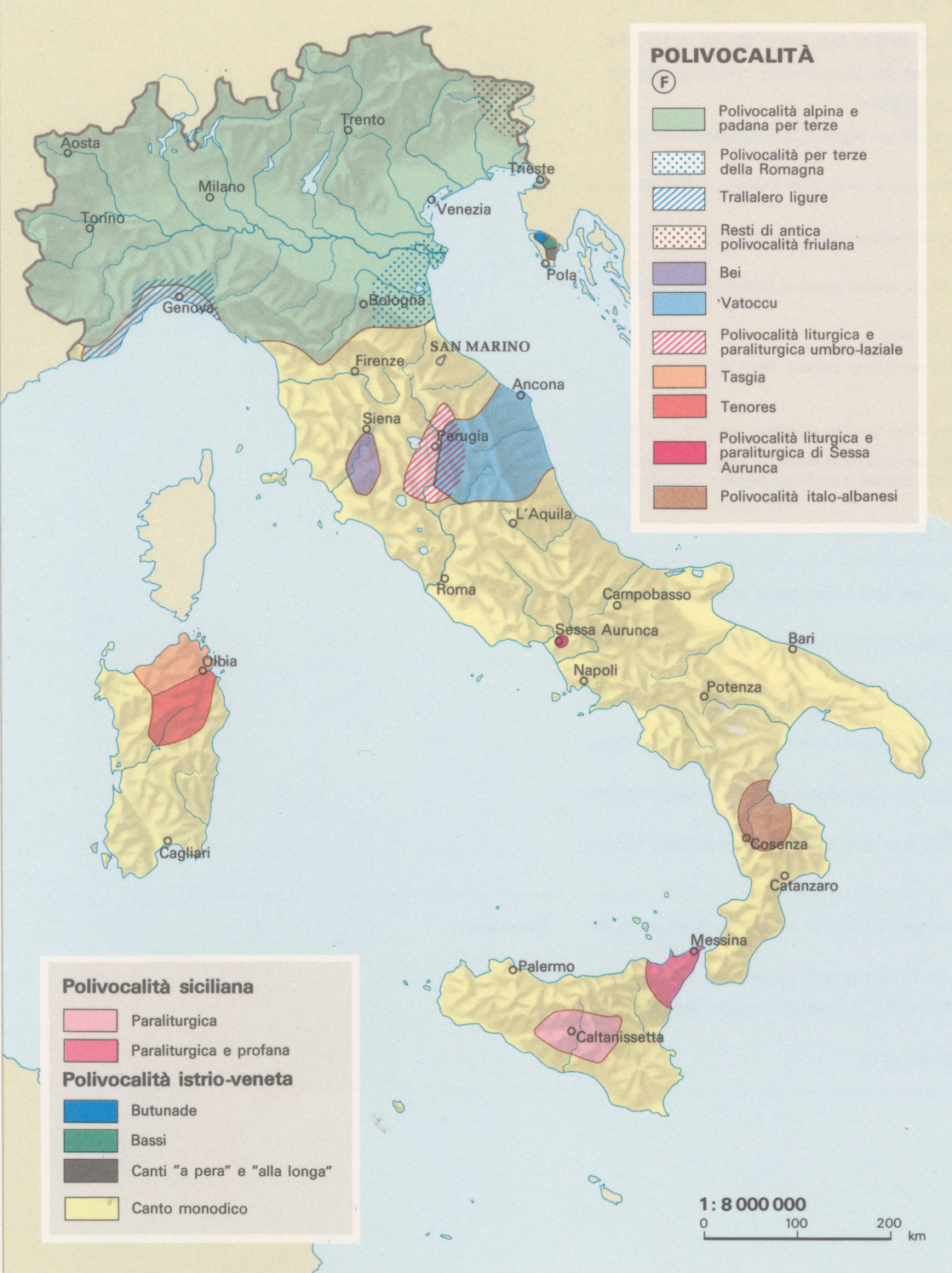
Map of polyphonic folk music in Italy

Cantu a tenore is traditionally practised by groups of four male singers standing in a close circle. Each singer has a distinct role, here listed in descending pitch order—form a chorus (another meaning of tenore):

- 'oche or boche (pronounced /oke/ or /boke/, 'voice') is the solo voice
- mesu 'oche or mesu boche is the 'half voice'
- contra is the 'counter'
- bassu as 'bass'

The bassu sings the same note sung by the 'oche, and contra a fifth above the bassu. The 'Oche and the mesu 'oche sing in a regular voice, whereas the contra and the bassu sing with a technique affecting the larynx. The 'oche sings a poetic text in Sardinian, which can be of epic, historic, satirical, amorous or even protest genre. The chorus consists of nonsense syllables (for example bim-bam-boo).

According to popular tradition, mesu 'oche imitates the sound of wind, while the contra imitates a sheep bleating and the bassu a cow lowing.

The solo voice starts a monodic vocal line and is then joined by the others as he indicates to them to join in.

The effect is somewhat that of a round except that the points where the other singers join in vary and, thus, the harmonies vary from version to version. The execution differs in details between each of the villages where a tenore is sung to such an extent that the village can be immediately recognized.

== Tradition ==
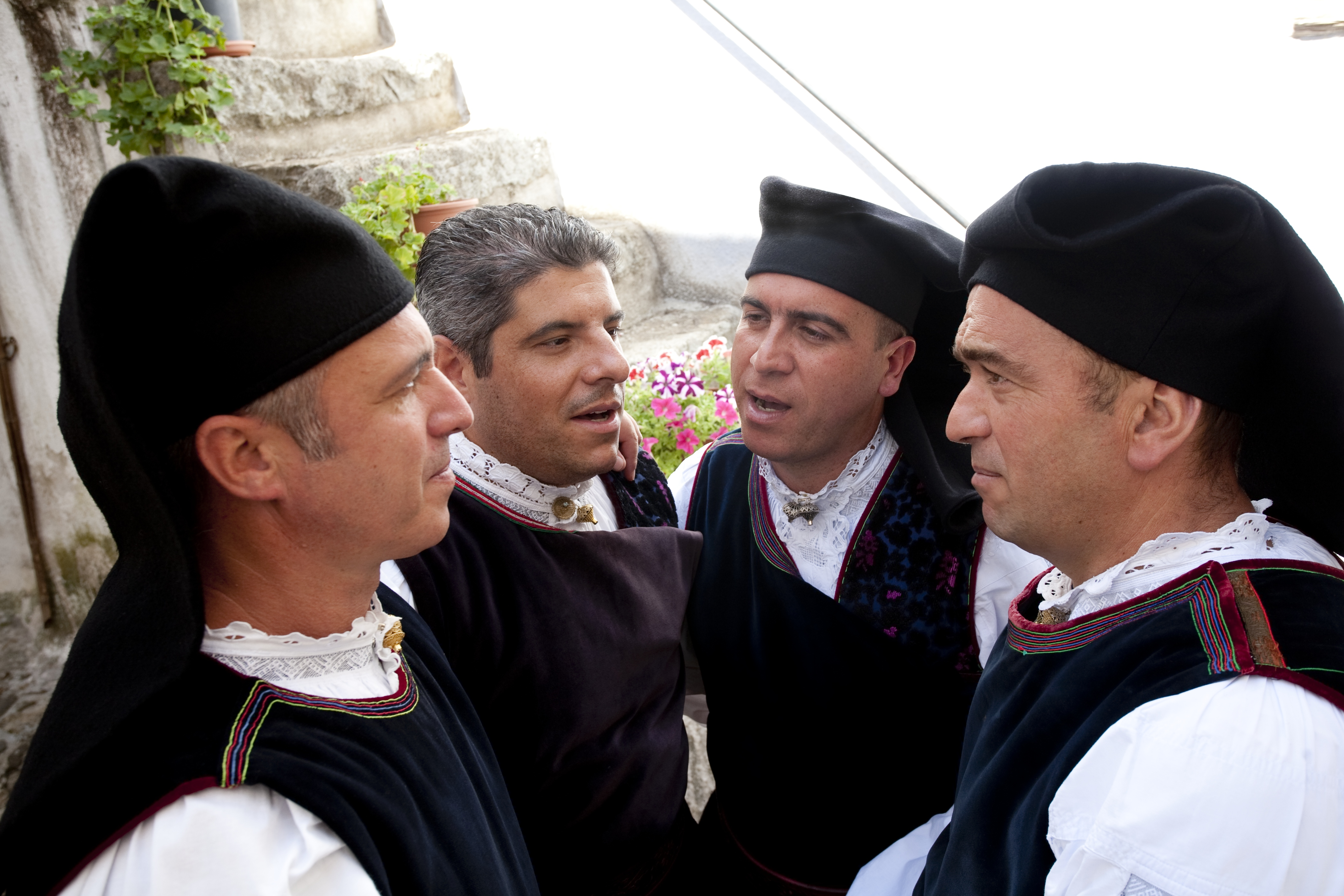
Tenores di Bitti

Ballu Seriu starts with single voices (Oche, Bassu, Contra, Mesu Oche)
Tenores di Bitti Mialinu Pira Live recording in Modena, June 2011

Although nowadays cuncordu and cantu a tenore are performed only by men, memories remain of a time when women groups performed as well, following the matriarchal tradition of Sardinia. According to some anthropologists, cantu a tenore was performed back in Nuragic times.

Some of the most well known groups who perform a tenore are Tenores di Bitti, Tenore de Orosei, Tenore di Oniferi and Tenores di Neoneli.

== Listening ==
- Tenore singers on a mountain

== See also ==
- Throat singing
