= Gavino Gabriel =

Gavino Gabriel (Tempio Pausania, 1881 – Rome, 1980) was an Italian composer, ethnomusicologist scholar of Sardinian music, especially that of Gallura, and has written and published many essays on the subject.

== Biography and career ==
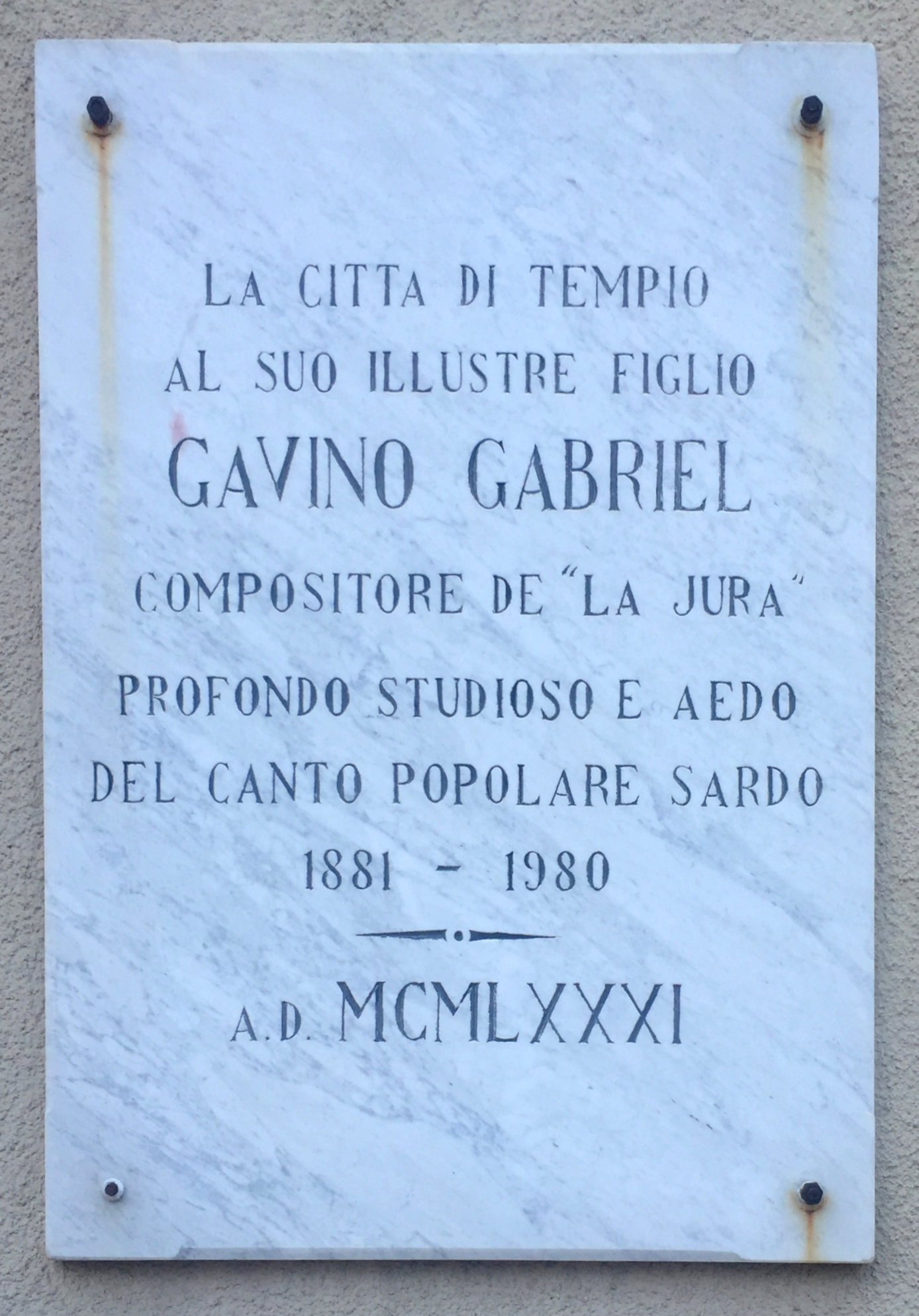
Municipio Tempio Pausania

In 1905 he graduated in literature at the University of Pisa, discussing an experimental thesis on literary aesthetic criticism; from 1906 to 1910 he settled in Florence where, under the pseudonym A.B. Salu (in Gallurese dialect: "guess it"), he collaborated in La Voce directed by Giuseppe Prezzolini. In 1910 on the Rivista Musicale Italiana, with the presentation of Ildebrando Pizzetti, he published his first ethnomusicological work, Canti e cantadori della Gallura.

In the years between 1922 and 1925 Gabriel in Milan carried out an intense activity of popularizing the new technologies of sound reproduction, he started with the recording for La voce del padrone of the collection of traditional Sardinian songs entitled I canti di Gallura, dell'Anglona, Marghine e della Barbagia. Later he continued with a series of demonstration conferences, promoted by the Minister of Education Giovanni Gentile, which culminated in the publication of some educational manuals for the use of primary schools (among these: Il "Grammofono educativo", Milano 1922; Programma discografico analitico per l'impiego del "Grammofono educativo" nelle scuole elementari italiane, 1924).

In 1928 he assumed the direction of the newborn Istituto centrale per i beni sonori ed audiovisivi ("Central Institute for Sound and Audiovisual Assets", or Discoteca di Stato), he composed an only opera La Jura; in 1934, following his initiative, a law was passed that extended the activity to "everything in the field of sounds that interests the scientific, artistic and literary culture" and, more particularly, to the collection of songs and dialects from all regions and colonies of Italy, as well as studies of glottology and history.

In 1935 he collaborated as assistant director to the celebrating film of the Bellini Centenary Casta Diva by Carmine Gallone. He made the documentary Nei paesi dell’orbace, filmed in Sardinia and published the following year by the Cines film production company.

=== The Eritrean period ===
In 1936, invited to collaborate in the daily newspaper La Nuova Eritrea of Asmara, he moved to Eritrea where he will remain until 1953. During his stay in Africa he dedicated himself to the study of local ethnography. In 1941 he wrote 162 proverbi eritrei (162 Eritrean proverbs unpublished) and Profili eritrei (Eritrean profiles), a collection of articles on local ethnography, published in the asmarino newspaper.

In 1949, with the Italian delegation led by Carlo Sforza, he went to the United States, at the United Nations temporary headquarters of Lake Success, to plead the cause of Eritrea's independence. On this occasion he met Giuseppe Prezzolini who a year earlier had been nominated "professor emeritus" of Italian studies at Columbia University. In Asmara he was in charge as librarian and in 1951 he made Italy acquire the Eritrean Historical Archive (no less than 48 crates) with autograph manuscripts of great value.

== Works ==
- Canti e cantadori della Gallura, Rivista musicale italiana, XVII, 1910, pp. 926–950
- Canti di Sardegna, Italica Ars, Milano, 1923
- Programma discografico analitico per l'impiego del "Grammofono" educativo nelle scuole elementari italiane (con due relazioni su gli esperimenti compiuti...), 1923–1924
- Musica a centimetri: avvisaglie e schermaglie fonografiche, prefazione di Giovanni Gentile, Roma, 1934

== Bibliography ==
- Susanna Pasticci (ed.), Musica e identità nel Novecento italiano: il caso di Gavino Gabriel, LIM, Lucca 2018. ISBN 978-88-7096-969-6
