= Italian folk music =

Italian folk music reflects a long and diverse history. National unification occurred relatively late on the Italian Peninsula, allowing its many hundreds of regional cultures to retain distinct musical traditions. Italy’s geographic position—at the southern edge of Europe and central to the Mediterranean Sea—has contributed to a wide array of external influences. French music, Slavic, Arabic, Greek, Spanish musical elements are readily apparent in regional styles. Italy's mountainous geography and the historical dominance of small city-states further encouraged the persistence of localized traditions.

Contemporary classification of Italian folk music often follows the geographic typology proposed by Alan Lomax in 1956, which has been frequently reiterated in later studies. The styles of Northern Italy and Southern Italy Central Italy exhibits a mixture of these traditions, alongside older indigenous forms such as narrative balladry. The music of Sardinia remains especially distinct, most notably for its polyphonic vocal tradition known as tenores.

== Italian folk revival ==
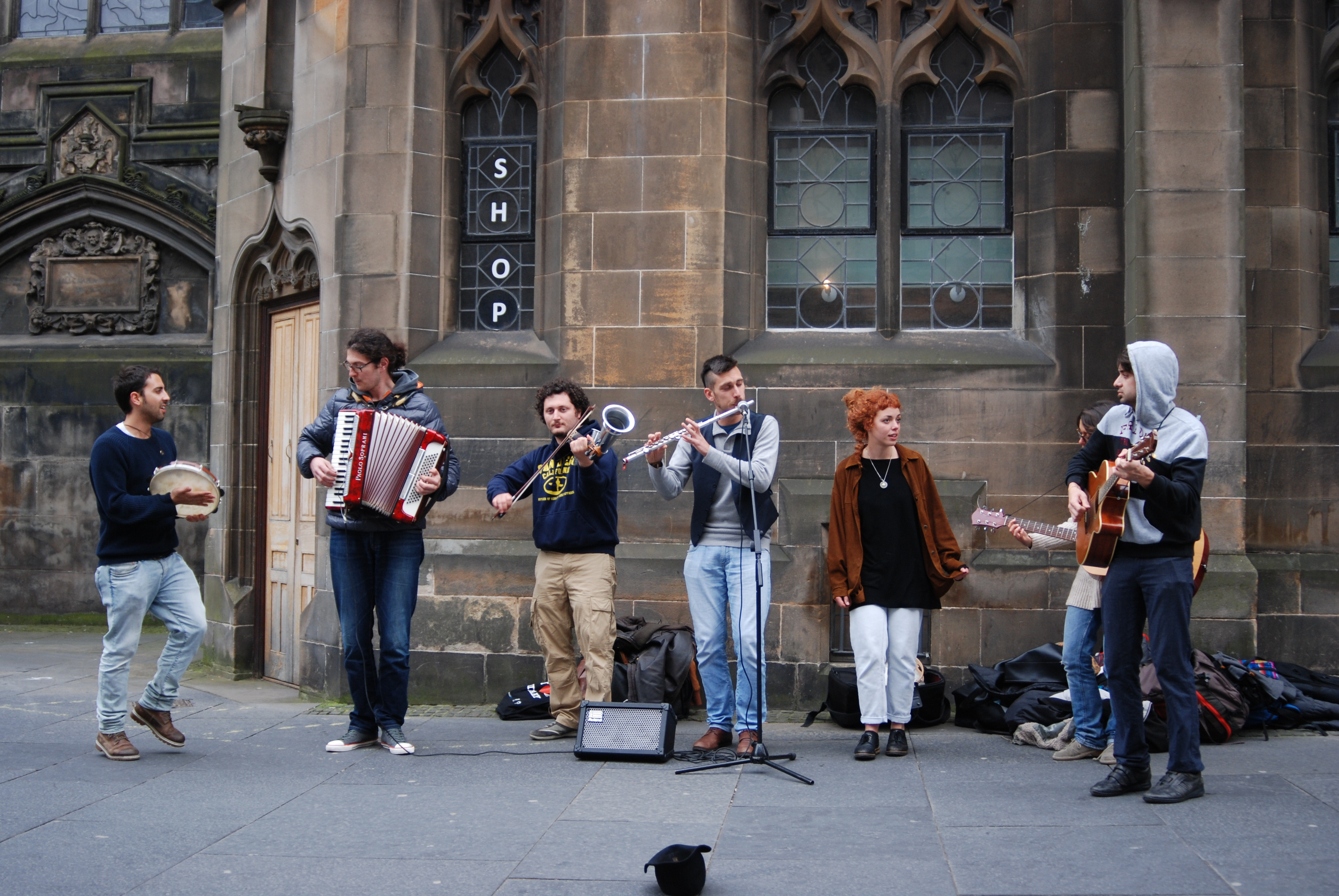
Italian folk musicians performing in Edinburgh

The modern understanding of Italian folk music developed alongside the rise of ethnomusicology in the 1940s and 1950s and the resurgence of regionalism in Italy during that period. The Centro Nazionale di Studi di Musica Popolare (CNSMP), now part of the Accademia Nazionale di Santa Cecilia, was established in 1948 to document and archive musical traditions across Italy. In the 1950s, significant field recordings were conducted by American ethnomusicologist Alan Lomax and Italian scholars including Diego Carpitella, Franco Coggiola, and Roberto Leydi. Toward the end of the decade, special attention was given to the musical traditions of the Meridione (southern Italy), including an influential study by Carpitella and anthropologist Ernesto de Martino on the tarantella.

The early 1960s saw the emergence of socially and politically conscious popular music, including numerous releases by the I Dischi del Sole label. Several notable groups were also formed at this time, including Cantacronache in 1958 and the Nuovo Canzoniere Italiano (NCI) in 1962. The NCI brought together musicians and composers, including Giovanna Marini, and made its first major public appearance at the 1964 Spoleto Festival dei Due Mondi. The group went on to produce a large number of recordings and live performances.

The Italian folk revival gained momentum by 1966, when the Istituto Ernesto de Martino was founded in Milan by historian Gianni Bosio to promote oral culture and document traditional music. With the formation of the Nuova Compagnia di Canto Popolare in 1970, a new model emerged in which ensembles focused on the music of specific regions—in this case, Campania. Many of Italy’s most recognized folk revival bands began during the following decade, including La Lionetta (1977), Tre Martelli (1977), La Ciapa Rusa (1978), Re Niliu (1979), Calicanto (1981), and Baraban (1983).

== Northern & central Italy ==
The northern regions of Italy historically exhibited influences in their cultures. Roots revivalists have revived traditional songs, though, from Piedmont (La Ciapa Rusa, Tre Martelli), Lombardy (Barabàn, Pandemonio) and Veneto (Calicanto).

The Genoese docks are the home of trallalero, a polyphonic vocal style with five voices, one of which imitates a guitar. It arose in the 1920s and includes modern groups like La Squadra -- Compagnia del Trallalero and Laura Parodi.

The highly urban provinces of northern and central Italy are also known for the medieval sung poetry ottava rima, especially in Tuscany, Lazio and Abruzzo. Ottava rima is performed by the poeti contadini (peasant poets) who use the poems of Homer or Dante, as well as more modern lyrics which address political or social issues. It is often completely improvised, and sometimes competitive in nature. Tuscan folk poetry is closer in form and style to high-culture poetry than is typical elsewhere in Italy.

The saltarello dance is also popular throughout the region. Canzoniere del Lazio is one of the biggest names from central Italy during the 1970s roots revival. With socially aware lyrics, this new wave of Italian roots revivalists often played entirely acoustic songs with influences from jazz and others. More modern musicians in the same field include Lucilla Galeazzi, La Piazza and La Macina.

== Southern Italy ==
Puglia is also home to brass bands like Banda Cittá Ruvo Di Puglia for the Tarantella; this tradition has led to collaborations with jazz musicians like Matteo Salvatore, Eugenio Colombo, Natale Galletta and Enrico Rava

Folk musical traditions in the area include a religious piece, Passiuna tu Christù, which recounts the Passion of Christ. The Passion is performed by street accordionists with two singers. An example of a pizzica song from Salento region is Kali Nifta (Good night). The lyrics were written in Griko by Vito Domenico Palumbo (1856–1918).

=== Sicily ===
Sicily is home to a great variety of religious music, including a cappella devotional songs from Montedoro and many brass bands like Banda Ionica, who play songs from a diverse repertoire. Harvest songs and work songs are also indigenous to the agricultural island, known as "Italy's granary". Franco Battiato, Fratelli Mancuso, Luciano Maio, Taberna Mylaensis and Ciccio Busacca are among the most popular musicians from Sicily. Busacca has worked with Dario Fo, like many Italian musicians, but is perhaps best known for his setting the poems of Ignazio Buttitta, a Sicilian language poet.

Fratelli Mancuso (brothers Enzo and Lorenzo Mancuso) have fused traditional Sicilian peasant songs (lamintazioni), monodic chants (a la carrittera) and other indigenous forms to create a uniquely Sicilian modern song style.

== Sardinia ==
Probably the most culturally distinct of all the regions in Italy, Sardinia is a Mediterranean island known for the cantu a tenore polyphonic chant, sacred songs called gozos, and launeddas, a woodwind instrument similar to the Greek aulos. Launeddas are used to play a complex style of music that has achieved some international attention, especially Dionigi Burranca, Antonio Lara, Luigi Lai and Efisio Melis; Burranca, like many of the most famous launedda musicians, is from Samatzai in Cagliari. An ancient instrument, dating back to at least the 8th century BC, launeddas are still played during religious ceremonies and dances (su ballu). Distinctively, they are played using extensive variations on a few melodic phrases, and a single song can last over an hour.

The ottava, or eight-line stanza, is a common lyrical form in Sardinia, one which allows the performer a certain amount of improvisation and is not unlike the stornello of south-central mainland Italy.

Rural polyphonic chanting of the tenores is sung with four vocal parts. They are bassu, mesa boghe, contra and boghe (respectively to be properly translated to English from Sardinian as "bass", "middle", "counter" and "soloist"). The most popular group is Tenores di Bitti. In November 2005, the Cantu a Tenore vocal style of the Sardinian pastoral culture was proclaimed a Masterpiece of the Oral and Intangible Heritage of Humanity by UNESCO.

Sacred gozos, or sacred songs, can be heard during religious celebrations, sung by choruses like Su Cuncordu 'e su Rosariu.

Other influential Sardinian musicians include Totore Chessa (organetto), Maria Carta (singer), Mauro Palmas, Elena Ledda and Suonofficina, Cordas et Cannas, Paolo Fresu (trumpet), Gesuino Deiana (guitar), Tazenda, Marisa Sannia.

== List of Italian folk songs by region ==
- Friuli: Quel mazzolin di fiori

== Bibliography ==
- Lomax, Alan (1956). "Folk Song Style: Notes on a Systematic Approach to the Study of Folk Song". Journal of the International Folk Music Council. VIII: 48–50.
- Magrini, Tullia (2001). "Italy: Traditional Music". In L. Macy (ed.). Grove Music Online.
- Sorce Keller, Marcello (2000). "Italy". In James Porter; Timothy Rice; Chris Goertzen (eds.). Garland Encyclopedia of World Music. Vol. 8: Europe. New York: Garland. pp. 604–625. ISBN 0-8240-6034-2.
- Sorce Keller, Marcello (2005). “La musique de l’émigration suisse et italienne aux États-Unis”, in L. Aubert (ed.), Musiques migrantes, In Folio, Genève, pp. 197–210.
- Surian, Alessio (1999). "Tenores and Tarantellas". In Simon Broughton; Mark Ellignham; Richard Trillo (eds.). World Music, Vol. 1: Africa, Europe and the Middle East. London: The Rough Guides. pp. 189–201. ISBN 1-85828-636-0.
