= All'Italia =

1835 poem by Giacomo Leopardi

- by Giacomo Leopardi
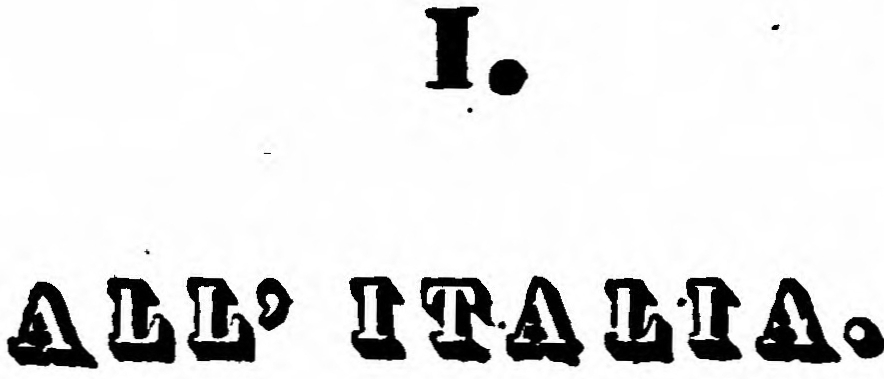
- Heading of the poem All'Italia in the edition of Antonio Ranieri in Opere di Giacomo Leopardi, vol. I, Napoli, Saverio Starita, 1835
- Country: Italy
- Language: Italian
- Publisher: Antonio Ranieri, Saverio Starita
- Publication date: 1835

All'Italia (English: To Italy) is a poem composed by Giacomo Leopardi. Dated to September 1818, Leopardi published it in Rome in the following year, along with its twin canzone Sopra il monumento di Dante.

The first edition of the Canti belongs to the tradition of Italian civil poetry, inspired by political and patriotic themes, inspired by classical works such as Dante Alighieri's Purgatory sixth canto and the ballads Spirto gentil and Italia mia from Petrarca's Il Canzoniere. The influence of Ugo Foscolo is also evident, derived by The Last Letters of Jacopo Ortis and Dei Sepolcri.

== Content ==
«O patria mia, vedo le mura e gli archi
e le colonne e i simulacri e l'erme
torri degli avi nostri,
ma la gloria non vedo [...]»
(All'Italia, lines 1-4)

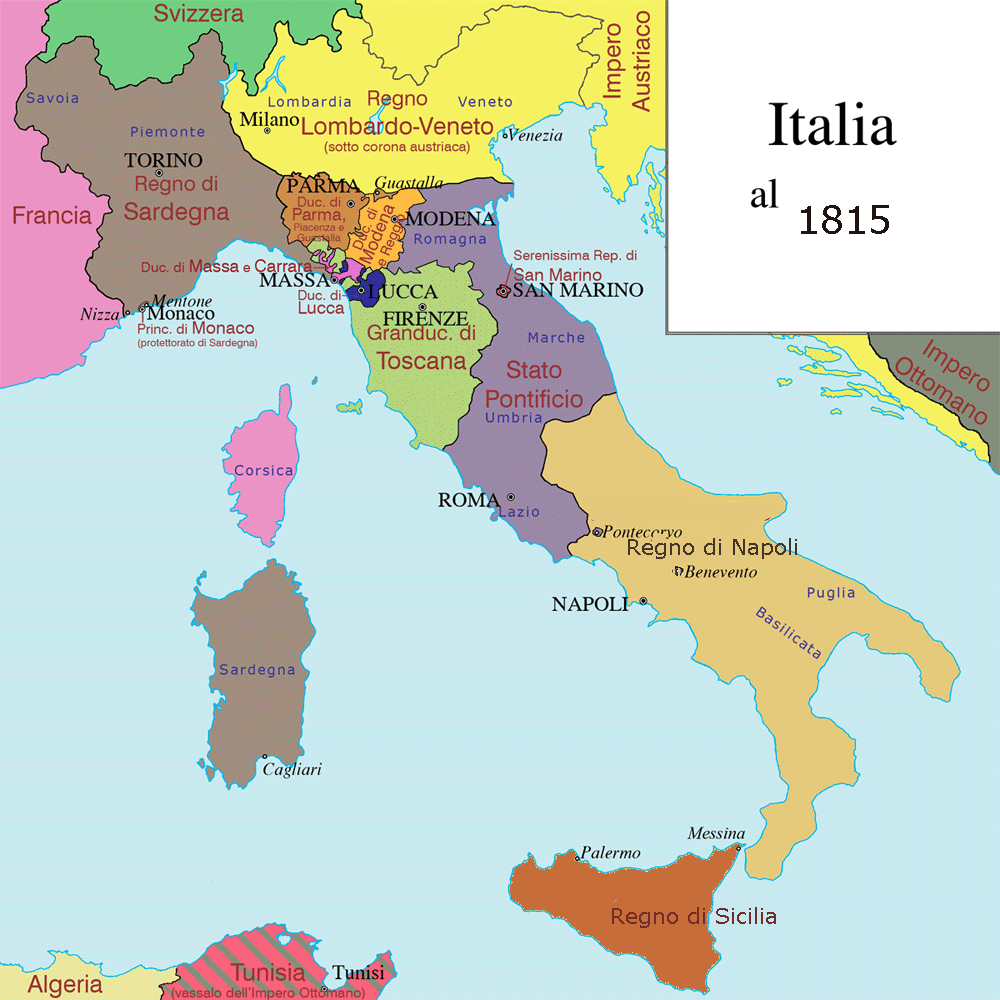
Italy during the Conservative Order

The poetic composition shows strong patriotism, being written a few years after the Congress of Vienna, which by establishing the Conservative Order cemented the political submission of Italy to foreign powers, mainly the Austrian empire. Leopardi deeply regretted the conditions of his time, comparing it to the greatness of ancient times.

=== The verses ===
In the first stanza, Leopardi laments the moral and civic decline of Italy, comparing it to a chained and despised beautiful woman, no longer a symbol of glory:

Piangi, che ben hai donde, Italia mia,

le genti a vincer nata

e nella fausta sorte e nella ria.

— All'Italia, verses 18-2

Starting from the fourth stanza, Leopardi recalls the ancient times, when many people were willing to fight to the death for their homeland. He cites the young Spartans who fell at Thermopylae to stop the Persian invaders:

Beatissimi voi,
ch'offriste il petto a le nemiche lance
per amor di costei ch’al sol vi diede

— All'Italia, verses 85-87

The poem is heavily inspired by the surging Italian patriotism against the newly established Conservative Order. Not many years later, the newborn Italian nationalism sparked the Risorgimento movement and the reunification of Italy itself, as Leopardi wished in his poem.

== Critical reception ==
All'Italia was included in the Canti as the opening poem. The collection was published in 1835, shortly before the author's death in 1837. While Francesco de Sanctis devalued all of Leopardi's earliest poems and judged his first lyricism as purely rhetorical and almost childish, Giosuè Carducci retorted that it was a distinct rendition of nostalgia for lost times.
