= Vincenzo Zitello =

Italian composer and harpist (born 1956)

- Born: 13 December 1956 (age 69); Modena, Italy
- Occupations: Composer, harpist

Vincenzo Zitello (born 13 December 1956) is an Italian composer and harpist who specializes in original music for the Celtic harp, or clarsach.

== Career ==
He began studying music at a very young age, playing the transverse flute, viola, violin, and cello. In 1975, he was part of Magnetic Loom, an experimental group led by Franco Battiato, along with Yuri Camisasca, Roberto Mazza, Lino Capra, Terra di Benedetto, and Mino De Martino.

In 1977, he dedicated himself to studying Breton culture and music through workshops at "Ti Kendalc'h" with Breton harpists Dominig Bouchaud and Mariannig Larc'hantec, while simultaneously studying classical harp with Lisetta Paleari. Zitello is also noted for being the first player and popularizer of the Celtic Cláirseach harp (metal strings) in Italy.

In 1980, he studied the bardic harp (Clasach) and British and Gaelic chant with Alan Stivell. In 1985, he joined Franco Battiato's tour with Saro Cosentino, who later produced a single by the duo under the pseudonym Kilim. This single, released by EMI under the name 'A Sciara,' featured a reworking of a traditional Irish piece sung in Gaelic and led to winning the "Gondola D'Argento" at the International Exhibition of Light Music in 1985.

In 1986, Zitello self-produced an audio cassette titled "Fragments of Aura Amorosa," which in 1987 was re-released as his first solo album, "Et Vice Versa." This album became the first CD and vinyl of Celtic harp recorded and published in Italy (by Stile Libero/Virgin), consisting entirely of original pieces by Vincenzo Zitello for the Cláirseach harp.

In 1988, he released his second album, Kerygma (Epic CBS Sony Music), which was presented at the Tenco Award. The album was also released in the U.S. by the Narada (Sona Gaia) label under the title Euphonia.

In 1994, he released his third album, La Via, published by D.D.D./BMG Ariola. This album was released in Europe in 1996 under the title Serenade.

In 1995, he composed the music for the show The Beat Generation, which featured readings and literary reworkings by Massimo Arrigoni on the Beat Generation, alongside musicians Daniele Caldarini, Federico Sanesi, Tobia Winter, Stephen James, and Amelia Cuni. A CD was produced for this show, which was presented during a tribute to Fernanda Pivano in Conegliano Veneto. Zitello also accompanied Allen Ginsberg in a reading, and the performance was reprised in 2007 for the tenth anniversary of the poet's death.

In 1995, he composed an Ave Maria in Latin for the Pauline Editions, which he presented live, along with singer Rossana Casale, Franco Parravicini, and Federico Sanesi, in Loreto, in the presence of the Pope and 400,000 young people from across Europe. The Ave Maria was published in a compilation of sacred music, Laudate Domini, released by CGD.

From 1997 to 2015, he served as the artistic director of the Isolabona HARPAE Festival, in alternating phases until 2014. In 1998, he released his fourth album, Aforismi dell'Arpa, published by RTIMUSIC and Sony S4.

In 2000, Famiglia Cristiana released the Easter 2000 CD Musica Caeli, a concert for the Jubilee, featuring pieces performed in St. Peter's Square in Rome in the presence of the Pope.

In 2001, he released the CD Vincenzo Zitello Trio, composed with Franco Parravicini and Federico Sanesi for the Felmay label. The album, titled Concerto, was recorded live at Bloom di Mezzago.

In 2004, the Fairyland label released his sixth album, Solo, which was entirely played on Celtic and Baric harps (Clasach).

In 2006, he founded a school for the rebirth of the Viggianese harp and became the director of the Viggiano Harp Festival. In 2007, he released his seventh album, Atlas, which features not only Celtic harps but also wind and string instruments.

In 2011, he released his eighth album, Talismano, entirely dedicated to the Bardic harp (Clasach) with 12 original compositions.

In 2012, he collaborated with Emanuela Maccarani's National Rhythmic Gymnastics team.

In 2014, he published his ninth album, Infinito, featuring original pieces for strings, oboe, flutes, and Celtic harp, inspired by the four seasons and elements.

In 2017, he released his tenth album, Metamorphose XII, a double disc with 12 original songs performed both with the harp alone and with a twenty-one-piece orchestra.

In 2019, he released his eleventh album, Anima Mundi, which includes 22 songs interpreting the Major Arcana of the tarot.

In 2021, he published his twelfth album, Mostri e Prodigi, featuring 8 songs inspired by the medieval bestiary.

In 2022, he released his thirteenth album, Le Voci della Rosa, with 10 songs inspired by Elisabetta Motta's critical work on nine contemporary poets.

He has held master classes at the Conservatories of Parma and Pesaro, served on the jury for the Prix du Trophée de Harpes Camac at the Interceltique de Lorient festival in 2010, and was part of the jury for the International Harp Sound Festival in Salsomaggiore from 2010 to 2014. He also served on the jury at the Saluzzo high school (Cn) in 2015 and 2016.

== Discography ==
- 1987 - Et vice versa (Virgin Dischi, SLLP 006; collana Stile Libero)
- 1988 - Kerygma (Epic, 465181 1)
- 1994 - La Via (DDD - La Drogueria di Drugolo, 74321 18905 2; distribuzione: BMG Ariola)
- 1998 - Aforismi d'arpa (RTI S4/Sony Music, 8012842130427)
- 2001 - Concerto (Live) (Felmay, FY 21750 8035 2; pubblicato come Vincenzo Zitello Trio)
- 2005 - Solo (Telenn)
- 2007 - Atlas (Telenn)
- 2011 - Talismano (Telenn)
- 2014 - Infinito (Telenn)
- 2017 - Metamorphose XII (Telenn)
- 2019 - Anima Mundi (Telenn)
- 2021 - Mostri e Prodigi (Telenn)
- 2023 - Le voci della rosa (Telenn)
- 2025 - Graal (Telenn)

=== Collaborazioni discografiche ===
- 1979 - Francesco Magni - Il Paese dei Bugiardi (Ariston – AR/LP/12344)
- 1984 - Nicola Frangione – Italic Environments
- 1986 - Alice - Park Hotel (EMI – 64 1187711)
- 1987 - Ivano Fossati - La pianta del tè (CBS – 460664 1)
- 1988 - Underground Life - 'Gloria Mundi (Hiara Records – HR 53705)
- 1990 - Quiet Force – 'The Maior and Miror Things (Les Folies Art – LFAD 12199
- 1990 - Ivano Fossati - Discanto (Epic – EPC 467079 1)
- 1991 - Mario Castelnuovo -Come sarà mio figlio (RCA Italiana – PL 75010)
- 1992 - Ivano Fossati - Lindbergh - Lettere da sopra la pioggia (Epic – EPC 471496 1)
- 1993 - Teresa De Sio - La mappa del nuovo mondo (CGD – 4509-93545-2)
- 1993 - Ivano Fossati - Buontempo' Volume 1 Live Teatro Ponchielli Cremona (Epic – EPC 473901 2)
- 1993 - Ivano Fossati - Carte da decifrare Volume 2 Live Teatro Ponchielli Cremona (Sony Music – 88697762852)
- 1993 - The Gang - Storie d’Italia (CGD – 4509 92426-1)
- 1993 - Cardinale/Parravicini - Canto D’amore (DDD – 74321-12353-2)
- 1993 - Bouchaud/Colas - Heol Dour (Keltia Musique – KMc 40)
- 1994 - Dagda Morrigan - Tir na nog
- 1994 - Claudio Rocchi - Claudio Rocchi (Mercury – 522 883-2)
- 1995 - Massimo Arrigoni - The Beat Generation
- 1995 - Casale/Zitello - Laudate Dominum
- 1995 - Mara - Mara (Psycho, 07432 12648829)
- 1995 - Tosca - Incontri e Passaggi (Rca – 74321461192)
- 1996 - Pooh - Amici per sempre (CGD East West – 0630 15818-2)
- 1997 - Quartetto Borciani - Razmatazz (Felmay – fy 7003, New Tone Records – 21750 7003 2)
- 1998 - Gai Saber - Espirit de Frontiera (Gai Saber (2) – GS 01)
- 1998 - Alice - Exit (WEA – 3984-24879-2)
- 1999 - Arcari/Corsi/Salis/Dalla Porta - Il viandante immaginario ( EGEA – SCA 073)
- 2000 - Musica Caeli - Concerto per il Giubileo (Famiglia Cristiana – FC0001CD)
- 2001 - Gaspare Bernardi - L’arco Terrestre (Amiata Records – ARCD 0701)
- 2002 - I Luf - Ocio ai Luf (UPR Folkrock – UFR 0017)
- 2003 - La Lionetta - Arzan (FolkClub Ethnosuoni – ES 5331, FolkClub Ethnosuoni – ES5331)
- 2003 - Dodi Battaglia - Assolo (Più In Alto – 5050466683922)
- 2003 - Greenoch - Greenoch
- 2003 - Vibrarpa - Scianti (Ikona Edizioni)
- 2003 - Tilion - Insolitariamente (Mellow Records – MMP 438)
- 2004 - Dino Betti Van Der Noot - Ithaca (Soul Note – 121399-2)
- 2004 - La Sedon Salvadie - Il cielo d’Irlanda
- 2004 - Lou Dalfin - L’oste del Diau
- 2004 - Francesco Magni - Scigula
- 2004 - Tao Alchemic Simphony - Tao
- 2004 - Carmelo Salemi - A sud dell’anima (FolkClub Ethnosuoni – ES5351)
- 2005 - Maurizio Camardi - Impronte (Caligola – 2073)
- 2007 - Luf - So nahit’h val Camonega
- 2007 - Roberto Tardito - Controvento
- 2007 - Dino Betti Van Der Noot - The Humming cloud (Sam Productions (2) – SAM 9008)
- 2008 - Piazza/Brahms - Ashbrah
- 2008 - Colossus Project - The Empire & the Rebellion (Musea – FGBG 4700)
- 2008 - Piazza/Brahms - Tiakuraka
- 2008 - Ivano Fossati - Musica moderna (Capitol Music – 5099923781825, EMI – 5099923781825)
- 2008 - Francesco Magni - Balada del Balabiott
- 2008 - Fabio Caucino - Passeggero dell’anima
- 2009 - Beppe Barra - N’attimo Marocco Music - MARM/012
- 2009 - Dino Betti Van Der Noot - God Save the Earth (Sam Productions (2) – SAM 9026)
- 2009 - Daal - Disorganicorigami
- 2010 - Lepricorns - La Figlia del vento
- 2010 - Duo Mille Miglia - A musical Journey
- 2010 - Girotondo D’arpe - Wandering Harps
- 2011 - Yo Yo Mundi - Munfrâ (Felmay – fy 8178)
- 2011 - Maura Susanna - Terra Mia
- 2011 - Stefano Melone e Vincenzo Zitello - Cosmos Orchestra
- 2012 - Dino Betti Van Der Noot - September’s New Moon (SAM Productions (2) – SAM 9036)
- 2012 - Emanuela Degli Esposti - Valse, arabesque, ballade, berceuse
- 2012 - Ar Nevez - Canntaireachd (Marzelle – MARZ013)
- 2012 - Daal - Dodecahedro
- 2012 - Zu Gruve - Summer Vibes
- 2012 - Girotondo d’arpe - For Christmas
- 2013 - I Luf - Mat e Famat
- 2013 - Dino Betti Van Der Noot - Dreams Are Made On (EGEA – INC 168)
- 2013 - Nichelodeon - Bath Salts
- 2014 - Alberto Patrucco /Andrea Mirò - Segni (e) Particolari (Sony Music – 88843039852)
- 2015 - Girotondo D’arpe - Girotond & Friends
- 2015 - Leggend and Prophecy - Crohm
- 2015 - Massimo Donno - Partenze (isage Music – VM3007, Visage Music – 012957.99120)
- 2015 - Dino Betti Van DerNoot - Notes are but wind
- 2016 - Uaragniaun - Primitivo(Suoni della Murgia SDM003)
- 2016 - Flo Gaggiano - Il mese del rosario
- 2016 - Fufluns - Spaventapasseri
- 2017 - Prowlers - Navigli Riflessi
- 2017 - Massimo Priviero - All'Italia (Edizioni Musicali Moletto – ME 035 CD)
- 2017 - Dino Betti Van Der Noot - Où Sont Les Notes D'Antan ?
- 2018 - Maurizio Geri - Perle D'Appennino (Visage Music – VM 3017)
- 2018 - Alessandro Parente - Storia di un antico Suonatore
- 2018 - The Magic Door
- 2019 - Alan Stivell - Uman-KeltHuman~Kelt (World Village Records, PIAS)
- 2019 - Dino Betti Van Der Noot-Two ships in the night
- 2019 - Martina Novelli-Yo
- 2020 - ZDL V.Zitello - D. Di Bonaventura - C. La Manna -Nudo
- 2021 - Alfio Costa - Frammenti (Ma.Ra.Cash Records – MRC093)
- 2021 - Paola Tagliaferro Paola Tagliaferro - Sings Greg Lake (Owl Records (7) – OWL4TP)
- 2021 - Arthuan Rebis -Sacred Woods
- 2021 - Dino Betti Van Der Noot - The silence of the broken lute (Audissea – ada 015)
- 2021 - Nichelodeon - Incidenti
- 2021 - Max Manfredi - Il grido della fata (Maremmano Records – MRM 025-2)
- 2021 - Osanna - Il Diedro del mediterraneo (Afrakà – DDM2021)
- 2022 - Zorama - Conteremo i fiori di un giardinoLA CELLULA/MAXSOUND
- 2022 - L'arcaico raggio - L'arcaico raggio (Fairylands Records – 001-2020)
- 2022 - Enten Hitti - La via lattea (Artisti Del 900 – AD9 011)
- 2022 - L'arcaico Raggio-Il signore della ruota. Ode ai quattro elementi. STAMAN (9791281045125)
- 2023 - Renato Franche & His Band Attimi di infinito.
- 2023 - Giuliano Mattioli .Notte. Solo Harp Nocturnal Works Of The 20th Century (Da Vinci Classics – C00720)
- 2023 - Dino Betti Van Der Noot- <let us ecount our Dreams Audissea (Audissea – ada 015)
- 2024 - Giada Colagrande-Agadez Queendoms
- 2024 - Ilenia Romano- Arbore Femina (Moonlighte Records)
- 2025 - Laerte Scotti- Dediche (Radici records)
- 2024 - Camerata Mediolanense- Atalanta Fugiens (Auerbach)
- 2025 - Davide Matrisciano- Libidal (La cellula Records)
- 2025 - Banda Solìa-"Ël Bal ëd la Còrda"
- 2025 - Terra Di Benedetto/Albergo Intergalattico Spaziale-"Navicomete" Psych-Out Records (PO-33048)
