= CNSMP =

CNSMP may refer to:

- Centro Nazionale Studi di Musica Popolare
- Conservatoire National Supérieur de Musique de Paris
