= Ada Negri =

Italian poet (1870–1945)

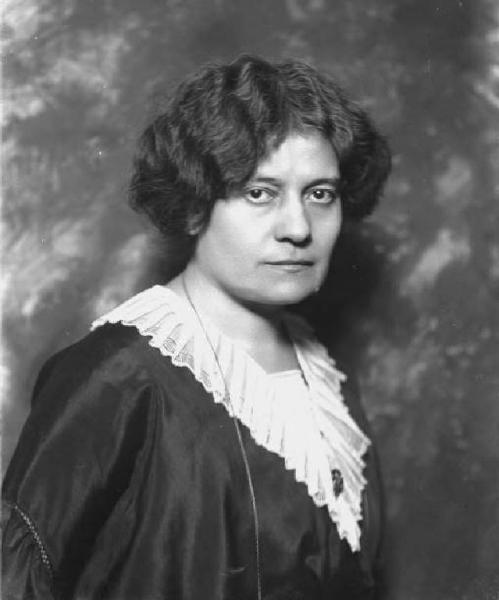
- Negri in 1913
- Born: 3 February 1870; Lodi, Lombardy, Italy
- Died: 11 January 1945 (aged 74); Milan, Italy
- Occupation: Poet

Signature
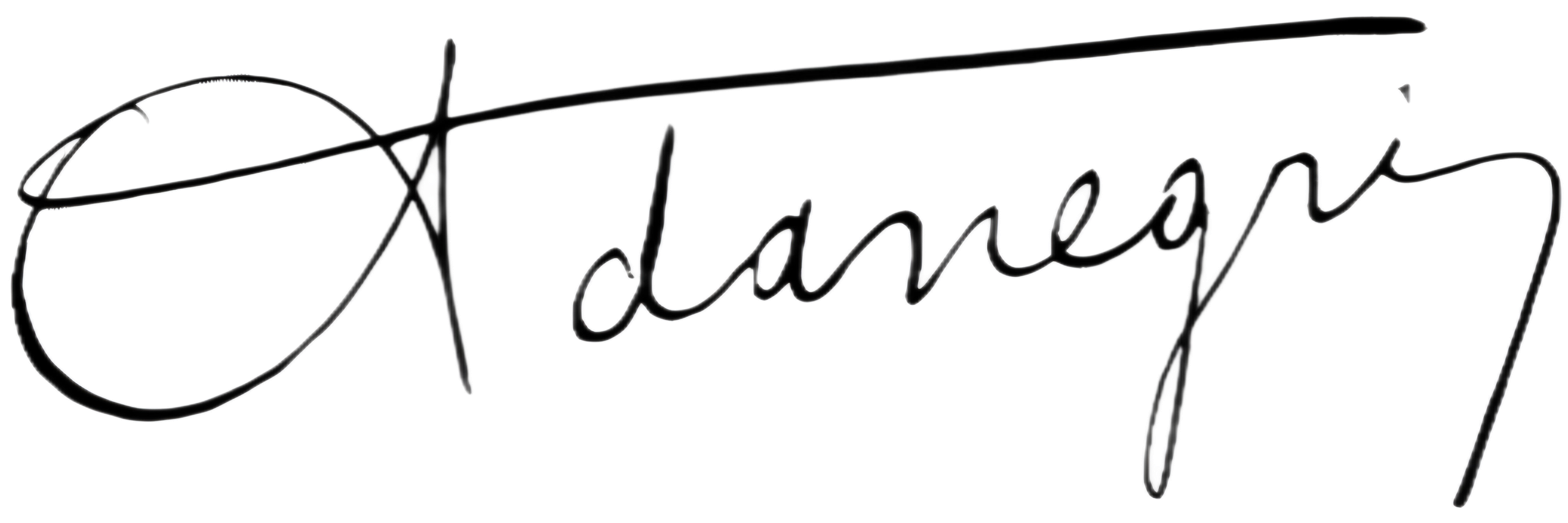

Ada Negri (3 February 1870 – 11 January 1945) was an Italian poet and writer. She was the only woman to be admitted to the Academy of Italy.

== Biography ==
Ada Negri was born in Lodi, Italy on 3 February 1870. Her father, Giuseppe Negri, was a coachman, and her mother, Vittoria Cornalba, was a weaver.

After her father's death in 1871, Negri's childhood was characterized by her relationship with her grandmother, Giuseppina "Peppina" Panni. Panni worked as a caretaker at the noble Barni family's palace, in which Negri spent much time alone, observing the passage of people as described in the autobiographical novel Stella Mattutina (1921).

She attended Lodi’s normal school for girls and earned an elementary teacher’s diploma. At eighteen, she became a schoolteacher in the village of Motta Visconti near the Ticino river, in Pavia. In her spare time, Negri would write poetry and submit it to local newspapers. Her early work appeared in the Milanese periodical L'Illustrazione Popolare. She was encouraged to continue her education by her teacher Paolo Tedeschi, who recognized her precocity and talent. Negri's inaugural volume of poetry, Fatalità (1892), was well received by readers and critics, earning her the "Giannina Milli" prize which provided Negri with a small stipend. These accomplishments led to an appointment as a professor at the normal school in Milan. Here she became engaged to the young socialist intellectual Ettore Patrizi and met members of the Italian Socialist Party, including Filippo Turati, Benito Mussolini, and Anna Kuliscioff. Her second book of poems, Tempeste (1896), was published the same year Negri broke off her engagement to Patrizi. The book contains reflections on heartbreak and a continued focus on social inequity.

On 28 March 1896, she married industrialist Giovanni Garlanda of Biella, who had fallen in love with Negri after reading her poetry. By 1904, they had two daughters named Bianca and Vittoria. Vittoria died in infancy. In 1913, Negri separated from her husband and moved to Switzerland to live in Zurich with Bianca. Negri remained in Zurich until the outbreak of the First World War, after which she returned to Italy.

She was a frequent visitor to Laglio on Lake Como, where she wrote her only novel, an autobiographical work titled Stella Mattutina (Morning Star). The book was published in 1921 and translated into English for publication in 1930. In March 1923, Negri began an extended stay on the island Capri, where she wrote I canti dell'isola. Mussolini nominated Negri for a 1927 Nobel prize, but it was subsequently won by fellow Italian poet Grazia Deledda. During this period, Negri often stayed at Palazzo Cornazzani in Pavia, the same building Ugo Foscolo, Contardo Ferrini, and Albert Einstein inhabited at different points in history.

In 1940, Negri was admitted as the first female member of the Italian Academy. However, this achievement stained her reputation later in life because members of the Academy had to swear loyalty to the Fascist regime. They were rewarded by the government with various material benefits.

Negri was one of the contributors to Lidel, a nationalist women's magazine published between 1919 and 1935. Her work was widely translated during her lifetime, with individual poems published in newspapers in the U.S. and elsewhere.

On 11 January 1945, her daughter Bianca found Negri dead in her studio in Milan. She was 74 years old.

== Reception ==
Benedetto Croce described her work as "facile, tearful, completely centred on the melodiousness and readiness of emotions—poetics that are somewhat melancholy, idyllic-elegiac". He dismissed her, writing that a "lack or imperfection in artistic work is most particularly a feminine flaw (difetto femminile). It is precisely woman’s maternal instinct, her 'stupendous and all-consuming' ability to mother a child, that prevents her from successfully giving birth to a fully realized literary work."

However, other critics saw her as "someone whose vision focused on the toils of life in a way few other writers did during those troubled times. Her naturally lyrical soul knew, in the major parts of her works, how to transform with an imprint of originality the sufferings, the bitterness, the joys of an entire generation." She was described as a writer who "abolished established conventions, and shaped her lyrics according to the rhythms of the heart, in sync to whatever it is that makes the winds blow, gives rise to the waters and pulse to the stars—a poetry infinitely free, capricious and precise."

Negri's initial acclaim within socialist circles earned her the name 'la vergine rossa' or 'the red maiden'. She fell out of favour after her marriage to Garlande, which was seen as a political betrayal.

Like many Italian writers of this period, her reputation after 1945 suffered from being associated with the Fascist movement, having received the Mussolini Prize in 1931. The prize was funded by Corriere della Sera.

The actress Pola Negri (born Barbara Apolonia Chałupiec) adopted the stage surname "Negri" in emulation of the poet. The actress Paola Pezzaglia, a personal friend of Negri, was an interpreter of her poetry on stage.

== Works ==
=== Poetry ===
- Fatalità (1892)
- Tempeste (1896)
- Maternità (1904)
- Dal profondo (1910)
- Esilio (1914)
- Il libro di Mara (1919),
  - The Book of Mara, translated into English by Maria A. Costantini, Italica Press (2011)
- I canti dell’isola (1925)
  - Songs of the Island, translated by Maria A. Costantini. Italica Press (2011)
- Vespertina (1930)
- Il dono (1936)
- Fons amoris (1946), published posthumously

=== Prose ===
- Le solitarie (1917)
- Orazioni (1918)
- Stella mattutina (1921)
  - Morning Star, translated by Anne Day. Macmillan Co., (1930). Republished, Sublunary Editions (2021)
- Finestre alte (1923)
- Le strade (1926)
- Sorelle (1929)
- Di giorno in giorno (1932)
- Erba sul sagrato (1939)
- Oltre (1947) published posthumously
