= Leo Levi =

Italian musicologist (1912–1982)

Leo Levi (1912–1982) was an Italian musicologist.

He was the first to study the oral musical traditions of Italian Jewry. Grandson of a rabbi, Levi's attempt to submit a PhD thesis at the University of Turin on the music in Italian synagogues was thwarted by the rise to power of Fascism and the spread of anti-Semitism in Italy. He was arrested on two occasions during his university studies for subversive activities. A fervent Zionist, he emigrated to Palestine in 1936.

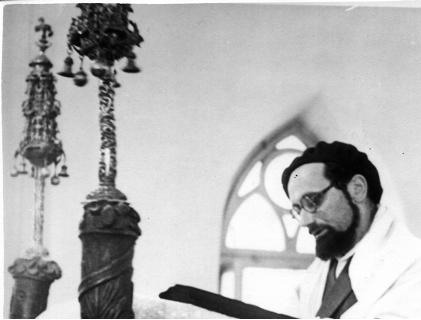
Leo Levi at the Italian Synagogue of Jerusalem

He returned to Italy after World War II, dedicating himself to the study of Italian-Jewish music. He collaborated with the Centro Nazionale Studi di Musica Popolare at the National Academy of Santa Cecilia in Rome and with other Italian ethnomusicologists working in the field, such as Giorgio Nataletti. He was an active part of the project of field recordings done by the RAI (the Italian Radio and Television service) to collect and preserve traditional Italian music, the results of which are preserved in the Santa Cecilia archives.

Levi was a research fellow at the Jewish Music Research Centre of the Hebrew university in Israel. Some of his research is available on a 2001 publication (CD and booklet) edited by Francesco Spagnolo, entitled Jewish Musical Traditions from the Leo Levi Collection (1954-1961), recording number AMTI CD 0102 of the Jewish Music Research Centre of The Hebrew University of Jerusalem and the Accademia Nazionale di Santa Cecilia, Rome. He is also the father of Natan Levi and Rabbi Joseph Levi.

He died in Jerusalem in 1982.
