= Müsa =

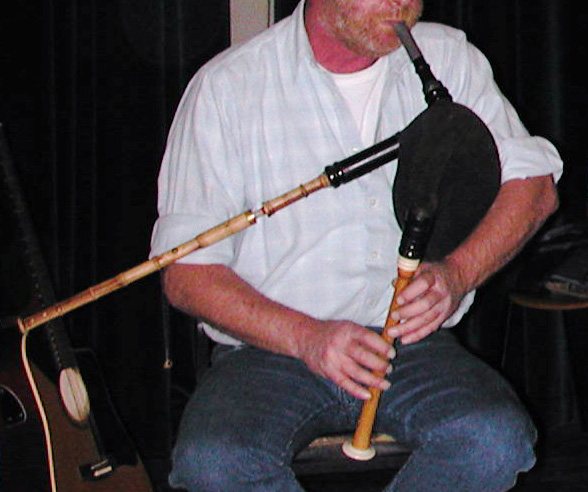

The müsa, or müsa appenninica, is a bagpipe from the Apennines of north-west Italy which was commonly used to accompany the piffero in the folk music of the Quattro Province: the ‘Four Provinces’ of (Pavia, Alessandria, Genoa and Piacenza). In the 1930s, however, the instrument fell into disfavour and was generally displaced by the accordion.

== Discografia ==
- 1986: I Suonatori delle quattro province - Musica tradizionale dell'Appennino - Robi Droli
- 1987: Baraban - I canti rituali, i balli, il piffero - ACB
- 1993: I Suonatori delle quattro province - Racconti a colori - Robi Droli
- 2001: I Müsetta - La vulp la vâ 'ntla vigna - Folkclub-Ethnosuoni
- 2003: Enerbia - Così lontano l’azzurro - EDT
- 2004: Musicisti Vari - Tilion - Folkclub-Ethnosuoni
- 2006: Musicisti Vari - Le tradizioni musicali delle quattro province - SOPRIP
