= Palazzo Cornazzani =

Medieval palace in Italy

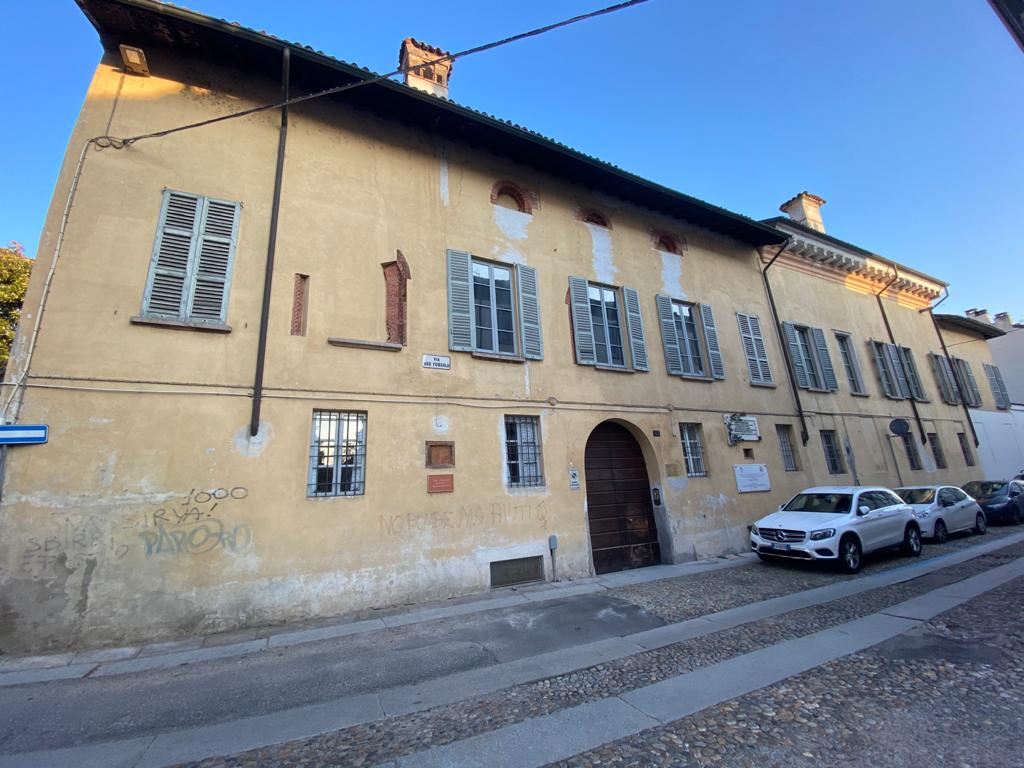
- The facade

General information
- Type: Palace
- Architectural style: Gothic
- Location: Pavia, Italy
- Coordinates: 45°11′00″N 9°09′47″E
- Opened: 15th century

Palazzo Cornazzani is a palace in Pavia, in Lombardy, where, between 1895 and 1896, Albert Einstein lived.

== History ==
The palace belonged to the noble Cornazzani family and was built in the 15th century, incorporating the remains of previous buildings, in late Gothic style. Originally the building had belonged to the aristocratic Beccaria family and passed to the Cornazzani in the 16th century through marriage; the Cornazzani were a lineage of Parma origin who served Filippo Maria Visconti for a long time first and then the Sforza, thus obtaining Milanese citizenship, and of which a branch settled in Pavia. Prominent personalities often stayed in the house, such as the governor of Milan Antonio de Guzmán or Cardinal Michele Bonelli, who apparently stayed more than a year in the Pavia palace.

Ugo Foscolo also resided there, in the company of his friend Giulio Gabrielli di Montevecchio, in the years in which he was a university professor in Pavia, which is why the building is now also called "Casa del Foscolo"; later the street where the building is located was named after the famous poet. Later the building was inhabited, at different times, by the professor Contardo Ferrini, by the poet Ada Negri and by a young Albert Einstein; the latter stayed there with his family in 1895, when his father Hermann ran a factory manufacturing electric machines in Pavia , from 1894-1896, arriving few months later to rejoin with his family, after abandoning his schooling in Munich. In the palace he wrote a short essay with the title "On the Investigation of the State of the Ether in a Magnetic Field".

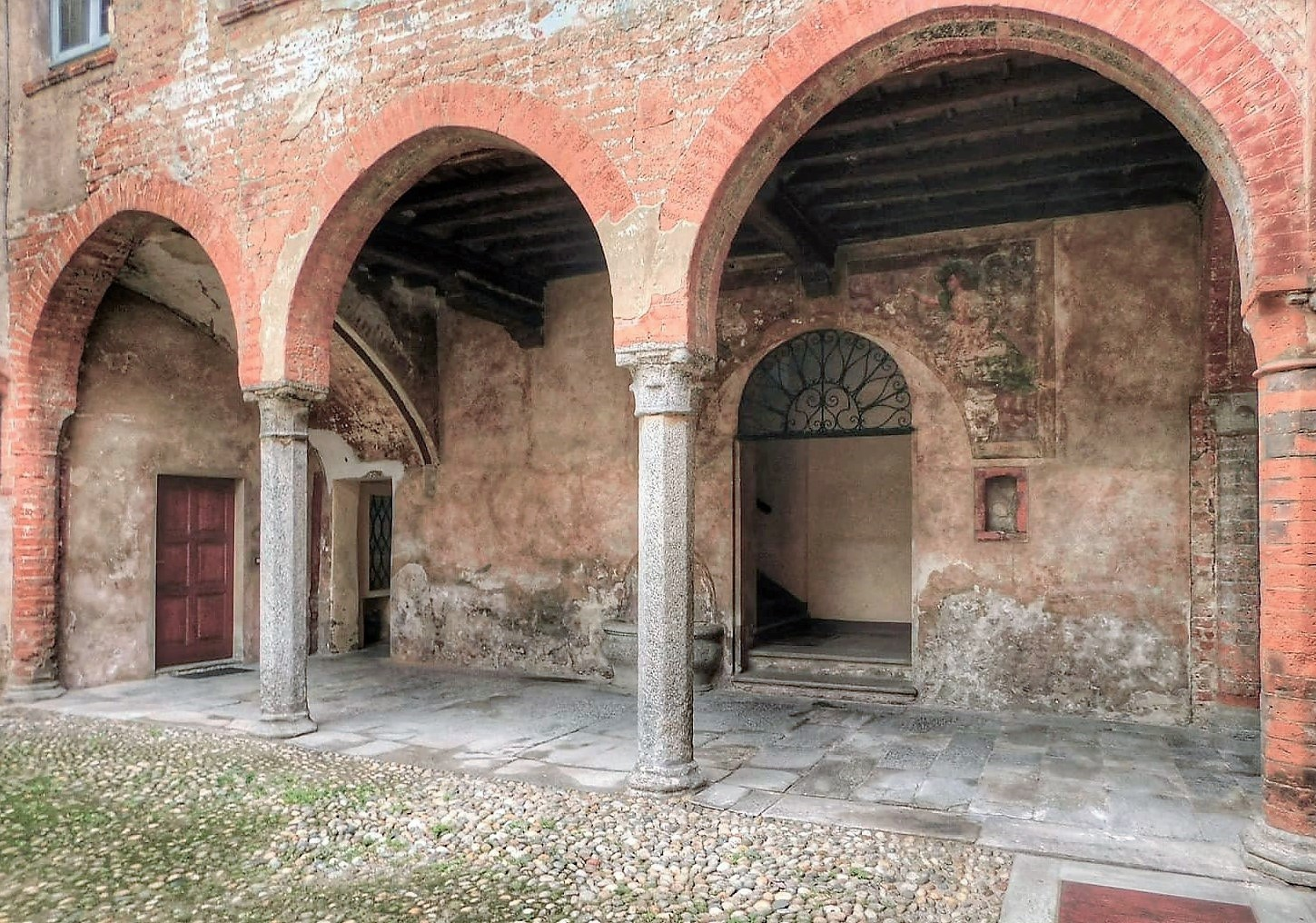
The courtyard.

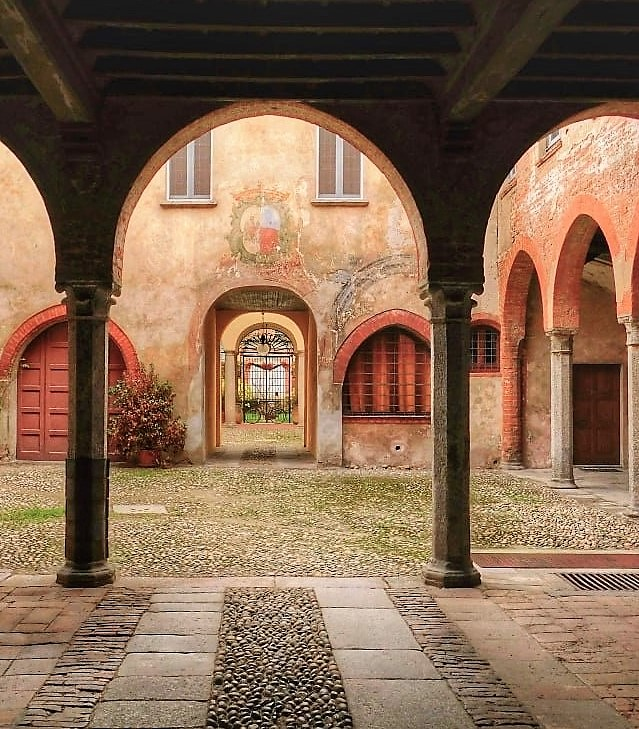
The courtyard.

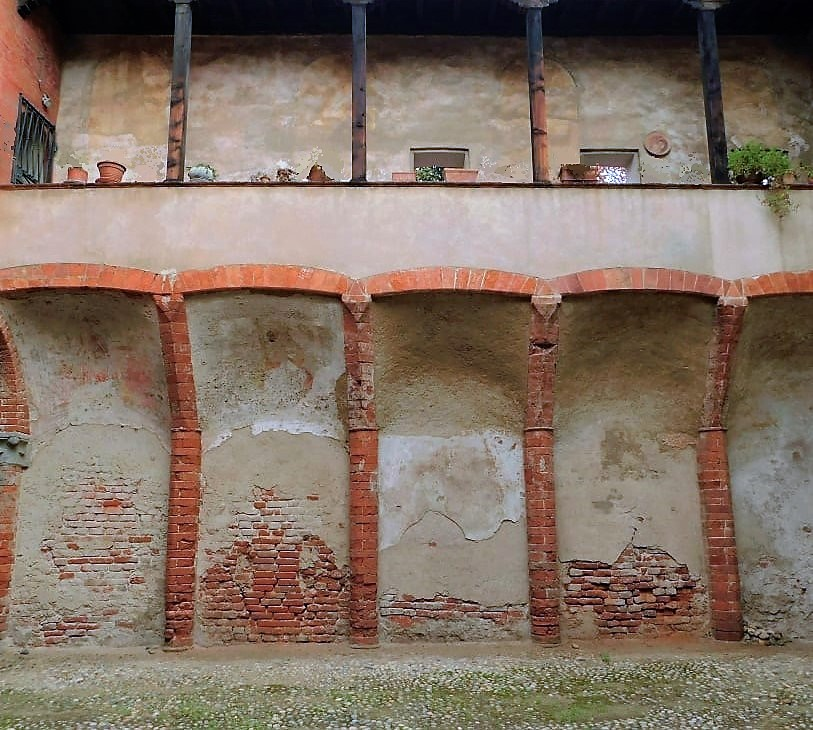
The loggia.

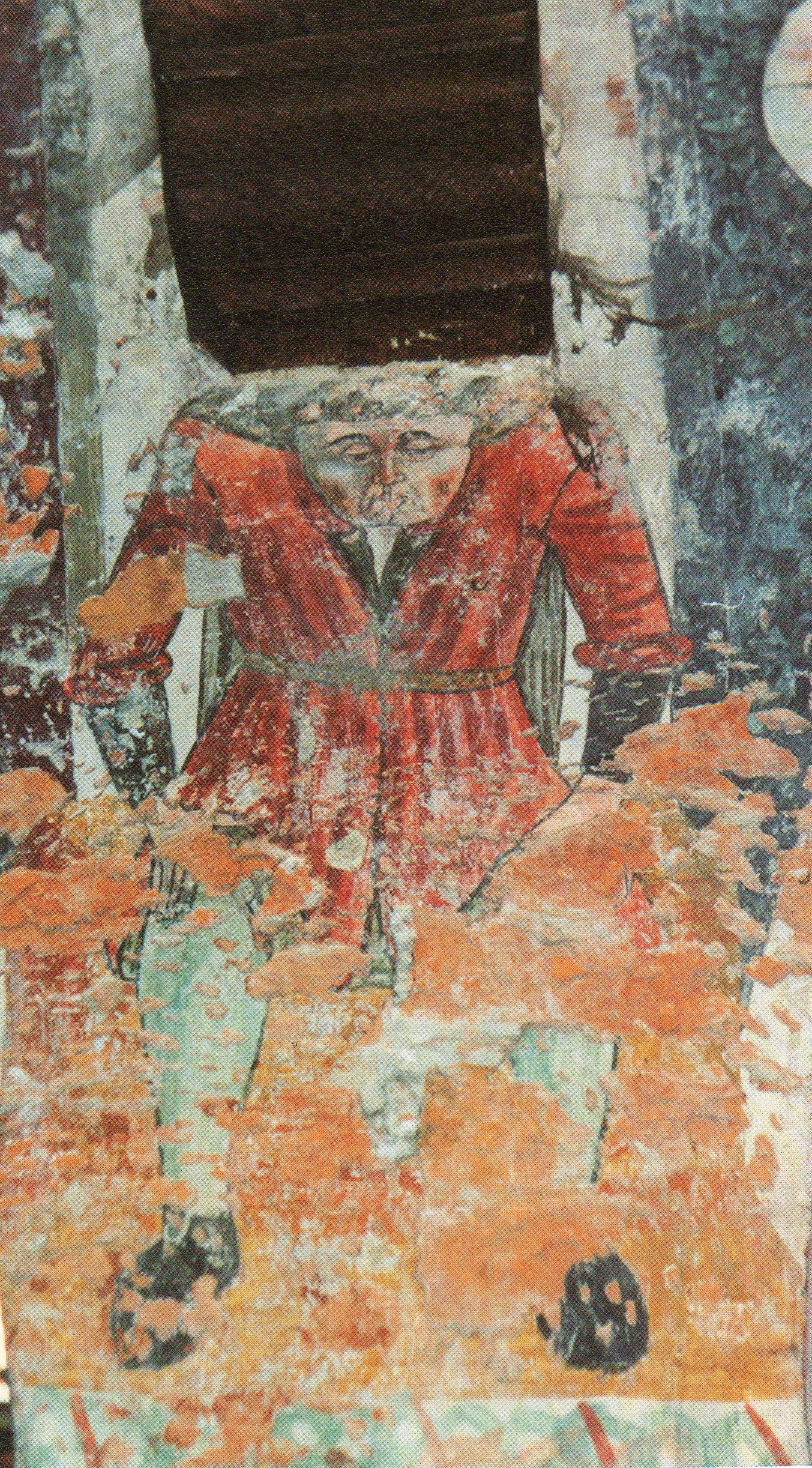
Detail of the late Gothic frescoes.

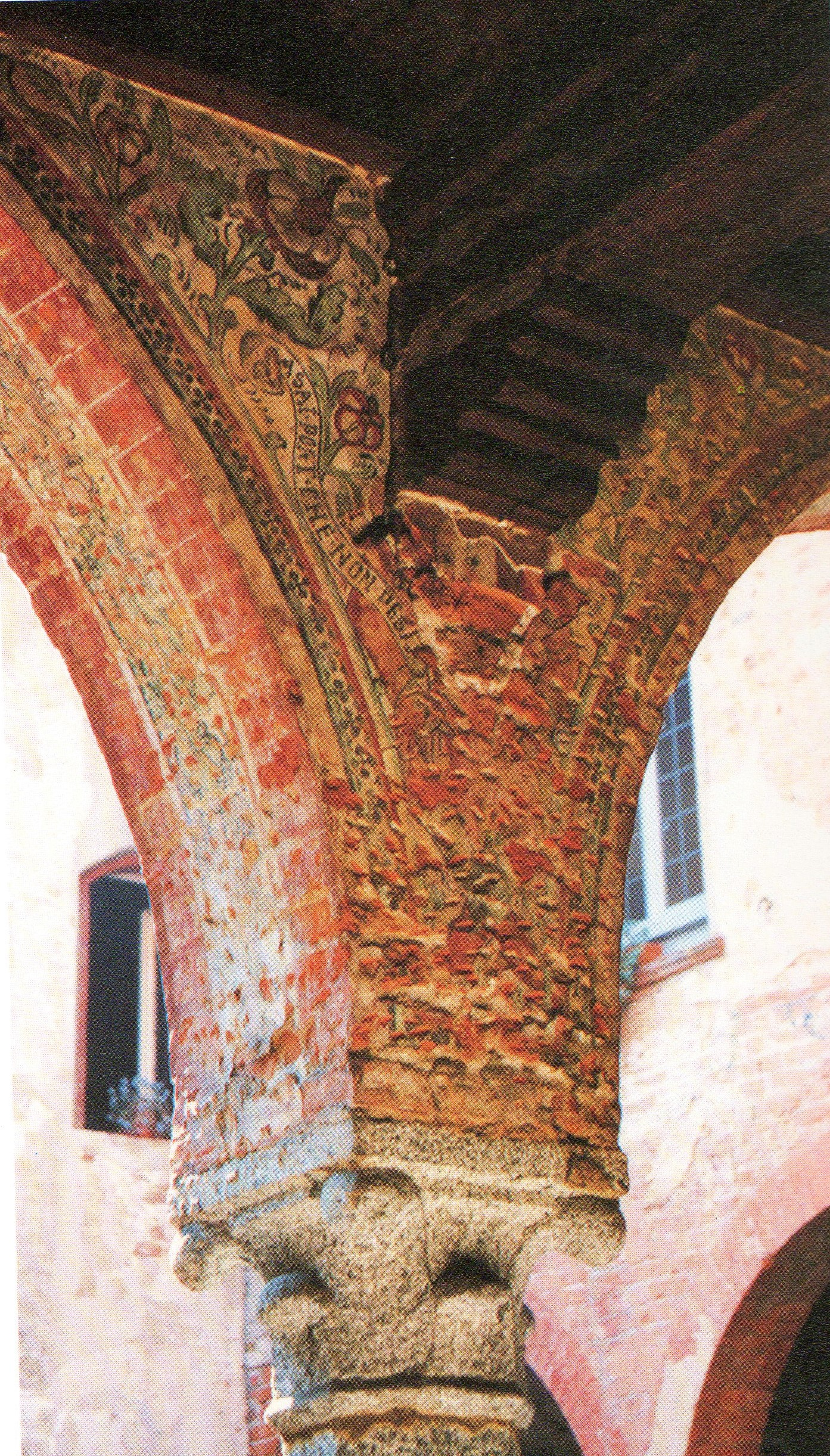
Detail of the late Gothic frescoes

== Architecture ==
The palace is structured on two courtyards: the first, dating back to the 15th century, has a late Gothic look, with a portico equipped with typical octagonal granite columns, very common in Lombard construction of the period, and enriched by numerous frescoes. The northern side of the portico retains a Gothic-style loggia, supported on the balcony by wooden columns. The second, where the Cornazzani coat of arms is frescoed in the lunettes, was added during the seventeenth century. On the facade, plastered in the modern age, there is a fifteenth-century terracotta tile depicting the Nativity. Inside, it preserves rich fifteenth-century coffered ceilings, Baroque frescoes and a neoclassical wing

== Bibliography ==
- Lucrezia Chiofalo, I palazzi a corte a Pavia. 1450- 1535, Milano, Industrie Grafiche Pubblicità Milano, 1993, pp. 60– 61.
- Andrea Del Giudice, Intonaci dipinti e graffiti a Pavia tra la fine del XIV e l'inizio del XVI secolo, "Bollettino della Società Pavese di Storia Patria", 94, 1994, p. 126, ISSN 2239-2254
- Chiara Porqueddu, Il patriziato pavese in età spagnola. Ruoli familiari, stile di vita, economia, Milano, Edizioni Unicopli, 2012, pp. 697– 699, ISBN 9788840015606.
