= Centro Nazionale di Studi di Musica Popolare =

The Centro Nazionale di Studi di Musica Popolare (CNSMP; Italian: "National Centre for Folk Music Studies") is a scholarly center for music studies in Italy. It is housed on the premises of the National Academy of Santa Cecilia in Rome.

The CNSMP was founded in 1948 by Giorgio Nataletti. Currently, the Archives of Ethnomusicology contain over 11,000 recordings of traditional music, including about 7,000 documents of Italian folk music. Special attention is devoted to the Central and Southern regions — including Sicily and Sardinia — and to liturgical chants of the Mediterranean. The collections include the research of Alan Lomax and Diego Carpitella, hundreds of documents recorded in 1954–55, as well as the results of the research of Ernesto De Martino and Carpitella in Southern Italy. Along with classification of its materials (which, since 1996, has included Leo Levi's collection of Hebrew liturgical music), the Archive has issued a journal since 1993, entitled EM — Rivista degli Archivi di Etnomusicologia dell'Accademia Nazionale di Santa Cecilia, which is currently published by Squilibri, Rome.

== See also ==
- Folk Music of Italy
