= Gianni Coscia =

Italian musician

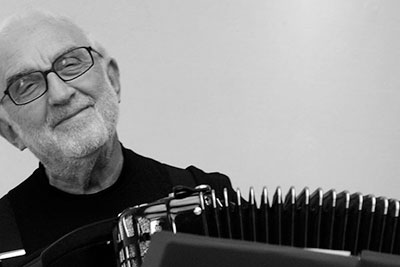
Gianni Coscia

Gianni Coscia (born January 23, 1931, in Alessandria) is an Italian jazz accordionist. Originally a lawyer, Coscia began focusing full-time on jazz music. Expresses an interest in developing "the remote values of cultural and popular tradition through the language of jazz." Has toured widely on the international jazz circuit. Of interest: the liner notes to his first CD were written by his former classmate Umberto Eco and he collaborated with Luciano Berio in the writing of the music of a stage show against antisemitism. Since 1995 he has collaborated with wood-player Gianluigi Trovesi mainly on the label ECM Records and since 2006 he has been a member of the Council of the Chigiana Music Academy in Siena.

== Discography ==
As leader

- L'altra fisarmonica (Dire, 1985)
- La briscola (Phrase, 1989)
- Il bandino (DDD, 1993)
- Radici with Gianluigi Trovesi (Egea, 1995)
- Come una volta with Gabrielle Mirabassi, Battista Lena, and Enzo Pietropaoli (Egea, 1996)
- A Kramer piaceva cosi (GE, 1998)
- La bottega (Egea, 1999)
- Round About Weill with Gianluigi Trovesi (ECM, 2005)
- In cerca di cibo (ECM, 2006)
- La bancarella di Gianni Coscia (Egea, 2007)
- Frescobaldi Per Noi (with Dino Piana, Fulvio Sigurta, Enzo Pietropaoli (Giotto, 2007)
- Something to Remember: Prima che il tempo cambi with Anna Maria Castelli, Renato Sellani (Audiophile, 2009)
- Frère Jacques: Round About Offenbach with Gianluigi Trovesi (ECM, 2011)
- L' Archiliuto di Gianni Coscia (Egea, 2013)
- Ansema with Tre Martelli (Felmay, 2014)
- La Misteriosa Musica Della Regina Loana (ECM, 2019)

As sideman

- Banda Sonora, Battista Lena (Label Bleu, 1996)
- Incontra Gianni Coscia (Iktis, 1997)
- L'anima delle cose with Max De Aloe, Massimo Moriconi, Stefano Bagnoli (Abeat, 2003)
