= Ugo Foscolo =

Italian writer, revolutionary and poet (1778–1827)

Niccolò Ugo Foscolo
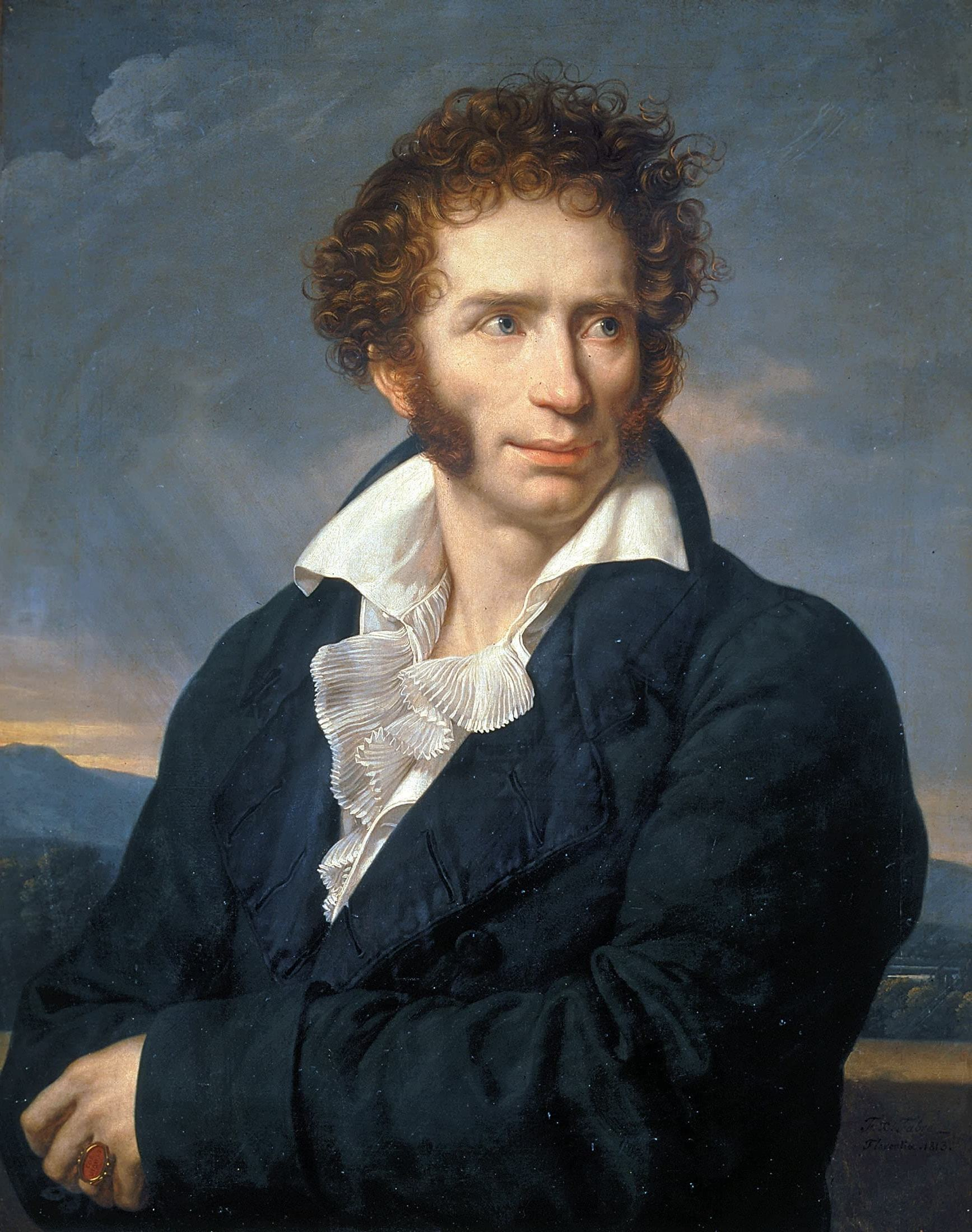
- Portrait by François-Xavier Fabre, 1813
- Born: 6 February 1778; Zakynthos (Zante), Ionian Islands, Republic of Venice, now Greece
- Died: 10 September 1827 (aged 49); Turnham Green, now London, England
- Resting place: Basilica of Santa Croce, Florence
- Citizenship: Venetian (1778–1799), Italian (until 1814), Britain (1814–1827)
- Occupations: Poet, writer, soldier
- Partner(s): Isabella Teotochi Albrizzi (1795–1796); Isabella Roncioni (1800–1801); Antonietta Fagnani Arese (1801–1803); Fanny "Sophia" Emerytt-Hamilton (1804–1805); Quirina Mocenni Magiotti (1812–1813)
- Children: Mary "Floriana" Hamilton-Foscolo (from Fanny Hamilton)
- Writing career
- Pen name: Didimo Chierico
- Language: Italian
- Period: 1796–1827
- Genres: Lyrical poetry, epistolary novel, literary critic
- Movements: Neoclassicism, Pre-Romanticism

Signature
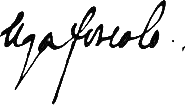

Ugo Foscolo (Italian: [ˈuːɡo ˈfoskolo, fɔs-]; 6 February 1778 – 10 September 1827), born Niccolò Foscolo, was an Italian writer, revolutionary and poet.

He is remembered for his 1807 long poem Dei Sepolcri, for writing what is considered the first modern Italian novel, The Last Letters of Jacopo Ortis (1798), and the carmen The Graces (1812).

== Early life ==
Foscolo was born in Zakynthos in 1778, in the Ionian Islands. His father Andrea Foscolo was an impoverished Venetian nobleman and medical doctor, and his mother Diamantina Spathis was Greek.

In 1788, upon the death of his father, who worked as a physician in Spalato (present-day Split, Croatia), the family moved to Venice, and Foscolo completed the studies he began at the Dalmatian grammar school at the University of Padua.

Amongst his Paduan teachers was the Abbé Melchiore Cesarotti, whose version of Ossian was very popular in Italy, and who influenced Foscolo's literary tastes; he knew both modern and Ancient Greek. His literary ambition revealed itself in the appearance in 1797 of his tragedy Tieste—a production that enjoyed a certain degree of success.

== Politics and poetry ==
Foscolo, who, for unknown reasons, had changed his Christian name Niccolò to that of Ugo, began to take an active part in the stormy political discussions which the fall of the Republic of Venice had triggered. He was a prominent member of the national committees, and addressed an ode to Napoleon, expecting Napoleon to overthrow the Venetian oligarchy and create a free republic.

The Treaty of Campo Formio (17 October 1797), under which, the French having indeed forced the dissolution of the ancient Republic of Venice, then handed over the city and the Veneto to the Austrians (in exchange for the Austrian Netherlands) gave a rude shock to Foscolo, but did not quite destroy his hopes. The state of mind produced by that shock is reflected in his novel The Last Letters of Jacopo Ortis (1798), which was described by the 1911 Encyclopædia Britannica as a more politicized version of Johann Wolfgang von Goethe's The Sorrows of Young Werther: "for Foscolo's hero embodies the mental sufferings and suicide of an undeceived Italian patriot just as Goethe's hero places before us the too-delicate sensitiveness, embittering and at last cutting short the life of a private German scholar."

The story of The Last Letters of Jacopo Ortis had a groundwork of melancholy fact. Jacopo Ortis had been a real person; he was a young student from Padua, and committed suicide there under circumstances akin to those described by Foscolo.

Foscolo, like many of his contemporaries, had thought much about suicide. Cato the Younger and the many classical examples of self-destruction described in Plutarch's Lives appealed to the imaginations of young Italian patriots as they had to the heroes and heroines of the Gironde in France. In the case of Foscolo, as in that of Goethe, the effect produced on the writer's mind by the composition of the work seems to have been beneficial. He had seen the ideal of a great national future rudely shattered; but he did not despair of his country, and sought relief in now turning to gaze on the ideal of a great national poet.

After the fall of Venice, Foscolo moved to Milan, where he formed a friendship with the older poet Giuseppe Parini, whom he later remembered with admiration and gratitude. In Milan, he published a selection of twelve sonnets, blending the passionate sentiments shown in The Last Letters of Jacopo Ortis with classical control of language and rhythm.

Still hoping that his country would be freed by Napoleon, in 1799 Foscolo enlisted as a volunteer in the National Guard of Napoleon's Cisalpine Republic, was wounded at Cento, near Bologna, and taken as prisoner to Modena. Liberated after the French armies took Modena, he took part in the battle of the Trebbia (1799) and was wounded again in defence of the siege of Genoa (1800). Following the battle of Marengo (1800), he returned to Milan, and there gave the last touches to his The Last Letters of Jacopo Ortis, published a translation of and commentary upon Callimachus, commenced a version of the Iliad and began his translation of Laurence Sterne's A Sentimental Journey Through France and Italy. He also took part in a failed memorandum intended to present a new model of unified Italian government to Napoleon.

In 1804, Foscolo returned to military service in Napoleon's cause, attached to the Italian Division of Napoleon's army, based in Boulogne-sur-Mer, as part of Napoleon's invasion force against Britain. Foscolo himself was stationed in Valenciennes, where he fathered a daughter, Floriana, by Sophia St John Hamilton, daughter of the Scottish novelist Lady Mary Hamilton.

Following the defeat at Trafalgar (1805) and Napoleon's abandonment of his plans for invasion, Foscolo returned to Italy in 1806. Before leaving France, however, Foscolo once again met Alessandro Manzoni in Paris. Some seven years younger, Manzoni was still living in the house of his mother Giulia Beccaria. Studies have noted very close analogies (textual, metrical and biographical) between the poetry of Foscolo and Manzoni in the period 1801 to 1803, such as those between Foscolo's All'amica risanata ("To the healed friend"), an ode to Antonietta Fagnani Arese, and Manzoni's Qual su le cinzie cime ("Who, on the peaks of Cynthus").

In 1807, occasioned by Napoleon's 1804 decree forbidding burials within city limits, Foscolo wrote Dei Sepolcri ("On Sepulchres"), of which James Montgomery Stuart wrote that "the entire spirit and language may be described as a sublime effort to seek refuge in the past from the misery of the present and the darkness of the future." In this poem, the author calls on the dead to fight once again for their country.

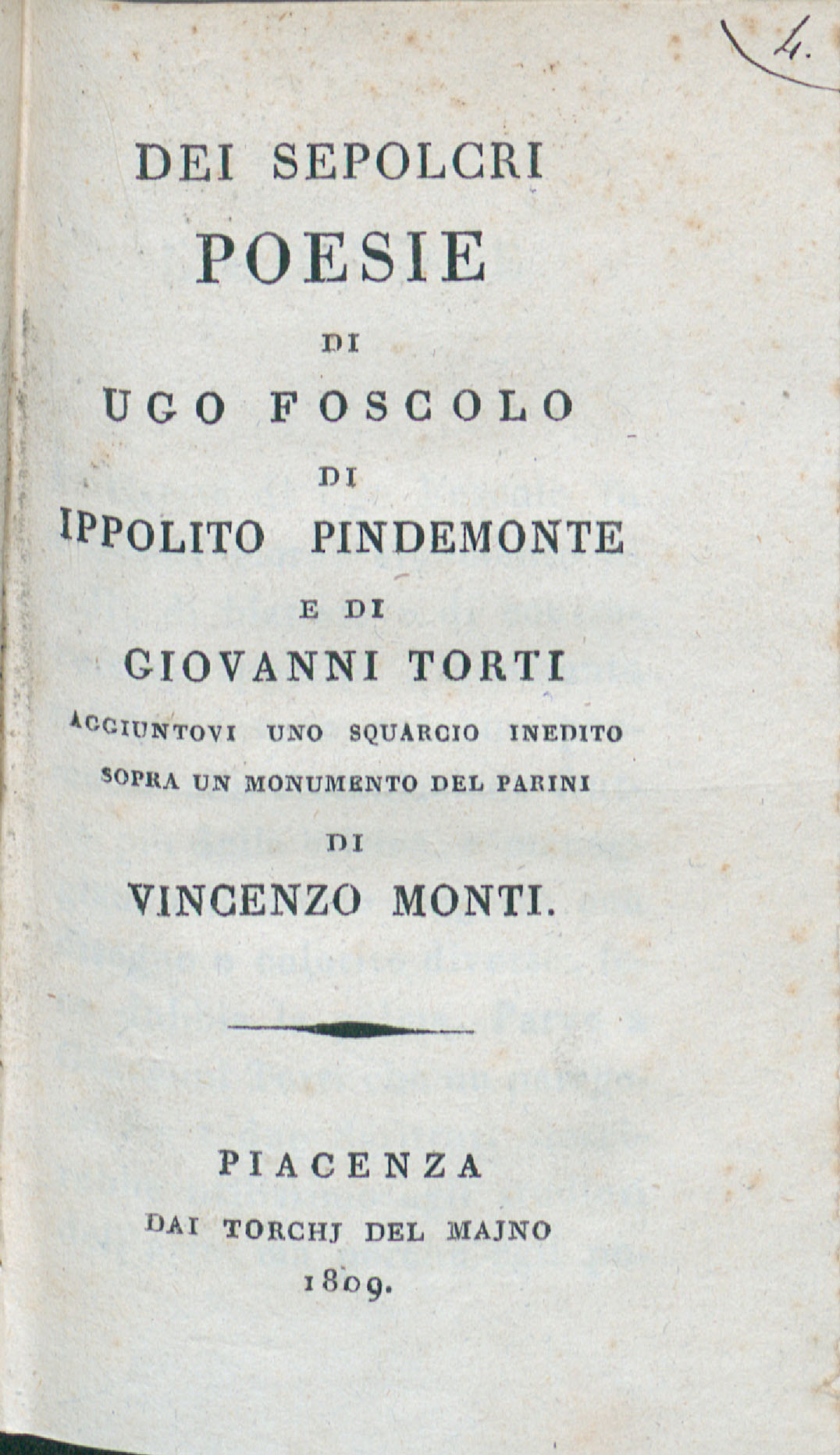
Dei Sepolcri, 1809

From Dei Sepolcri, 1807

All'ombra de' cipressi e dentro l'urne
confortate di pianto è forse il sonno
della morte men duro? Ove piú il Sole
per me alla terra non-fecondi questa
bella d'erbe famiglia e d'animali,
e quando vaghe di lusinghe innanzi
a me non-danzeran l'ore future,
né da te, dolce amico, udrò piú il verso
e la mesta armonia che lo governa,
né piú nel cor mi parlerà lo spirto
delle vergini Muse e dell'amore,
unico spirto a mia vita raminga,
qual fia ristoro a' dí perduti un sasso
che distingua le mie dalle infinite
ossa che in terra e in mar semina morte?

— Lines 1–15

English translation:
Beneath the cypress shade, or sculptured urn
By fond tears watered, is the sleep of death
Less heavy? — When for me the sun no more
Shall shine on earth, to bless with genial beams
This beauteous race of beings animate —
When bright with flattering hues the coming hours
No longer dance before me — and I hear
No more, regarded friend, thy dulcet verse,
Nor the sad gentle harmony it breathes —
When mute within my breast the inspiring voice
Of youthful poesy, and love, sole light
To this my wandering life — what guerdon then
For vanished years will be the marble reared
To mark my dust amid the countless throng

Wherewith the Spoiler strews the land and sea?

In January 1809, Foscolo was appointed to the chair of Italian rhetoric at the University of Pavia. In Pavia, Foscolo resided at the Palazzo Cornazzani, later home to Contardo Ferrini, to Ada Negri and to Albert Einstein, respectively. His inaugural lecture, titled On the origin and duty of literature, was conceived in the same spirit as his Dei Sepolcri. In his lecture, Foscolo urged his young countrymen to study literature, not in obedience to academic traditions, but in their relation to individual and national life and growth.

The sensation produced by this lecture played no small part in provoking the decree of Napoleon by which the chair of rhetoric was abolished in all the Italian universities under Napoleonic control. Soon afterwards, in 1811 Foscolo's tragedy Ajace ("Ajax") was presented at Milan, with little success; and because of its supposed allusions to Napoleon, he was forced in 1812 to move from Milan to Tuscany.

The chief fruits of his stay in Florence were the tragedy of Ricciarda, the Ode to the Graces, left unfinished, dedicated to Antonio Canova, and the completion of his translation of Laurence Sterne's Sentimental Journey, including his own fictional memoir Notizia intorno a Didimo Chierico ("News concerning Didymus the cleric", 1813), covering much of the same ground as that of Sterne's main character, the Reverend Yorick; which Foscolo had begun during his service at Boulogne-sur-Mer. In his account of Notizia intorno a Didimo Chierico, Foscolo throws much light on his own character. His version of Sterne is an important feature in his personal history.

Foscolo returned to Milan in 1813, until the return of the Austrians in 1815; from there he passed into Switzerland, where he wrote a fierce satire in Latin on his political and literary opponents; and finally he went to England at the close of 1816.

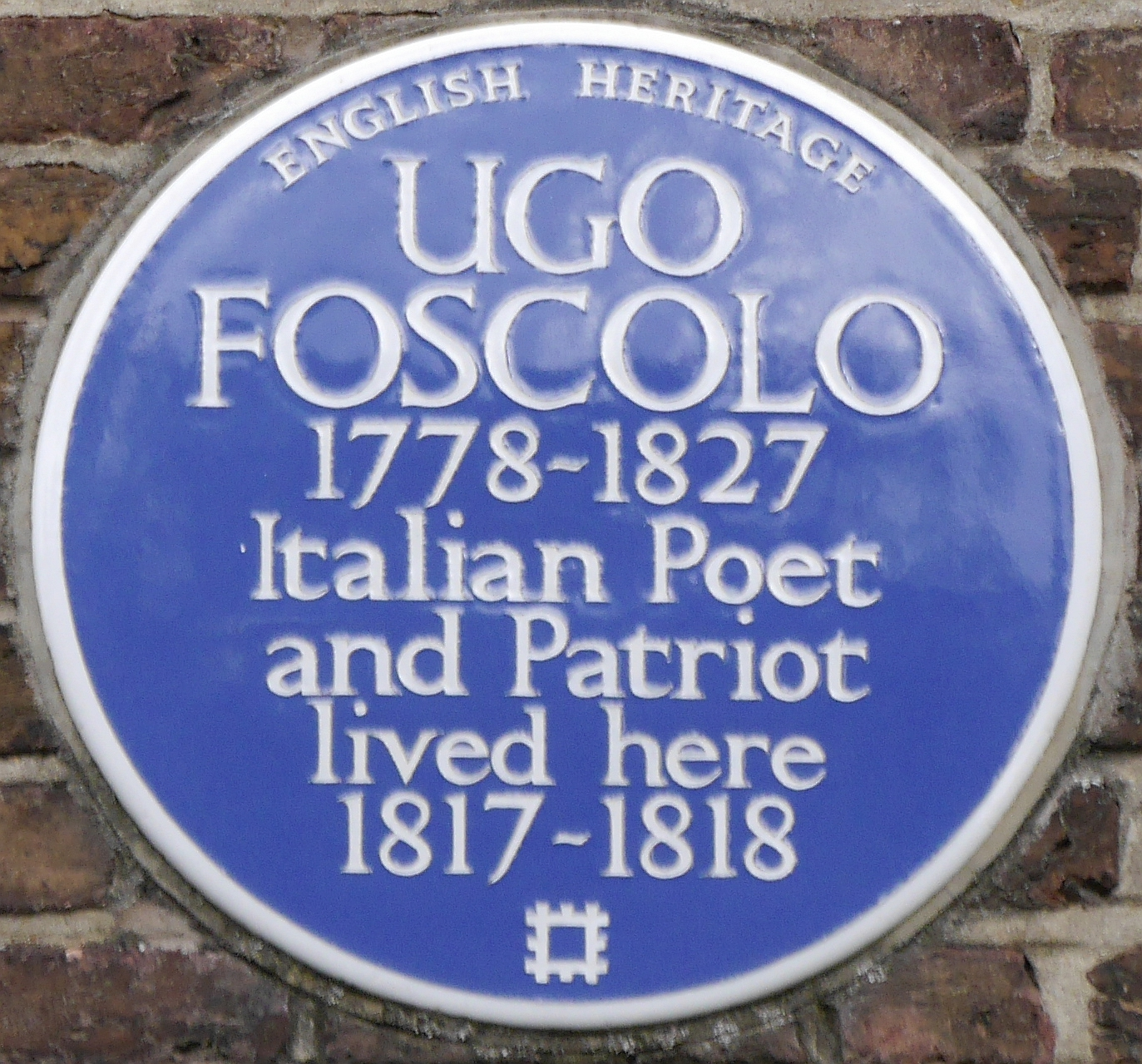
Blue plaque in Edwardes Square in west London

== London ==
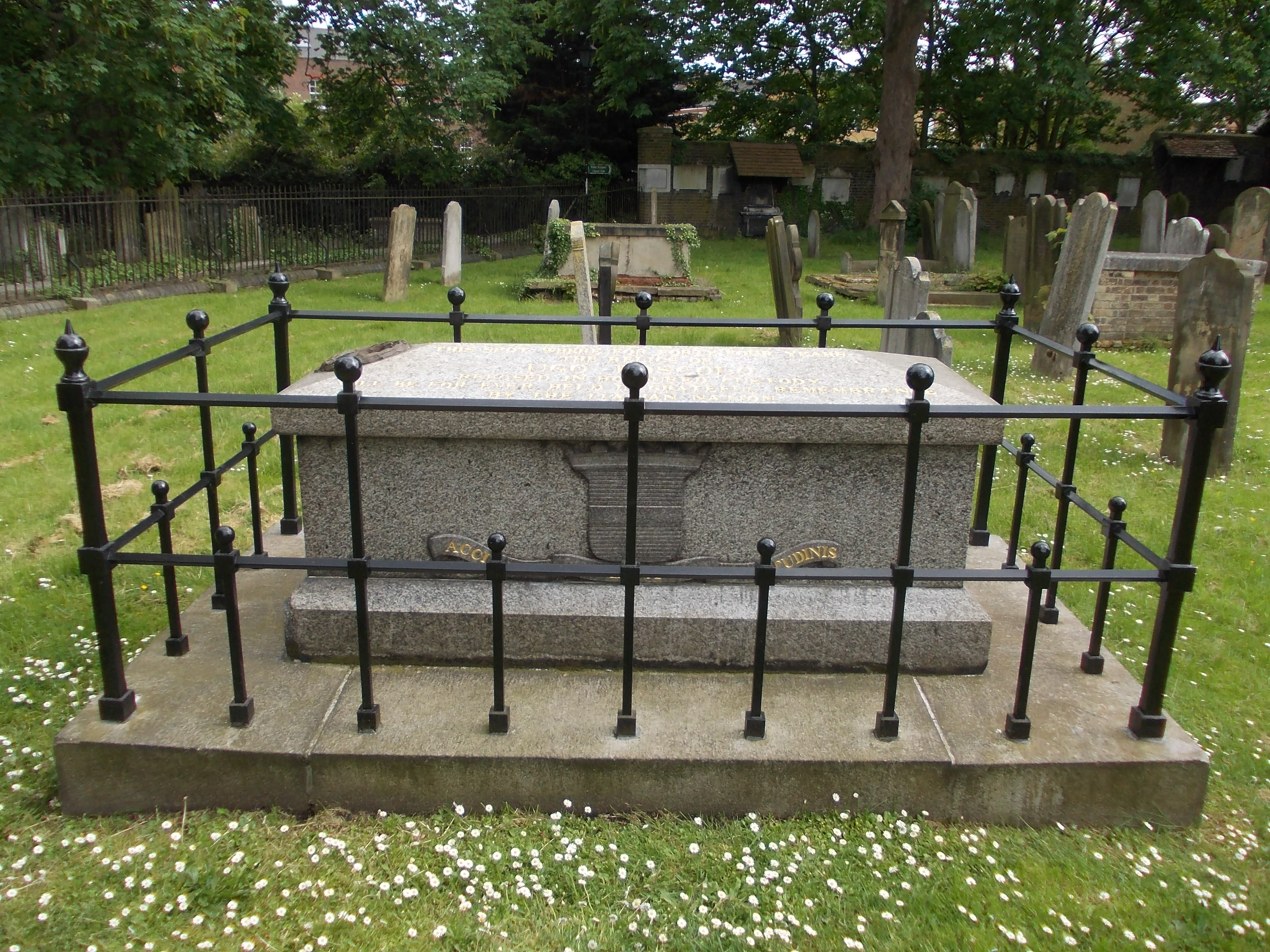
His now-empty tomb in the churchyard of St Nicholas Church, Chiswick

During the eleven years spent by Foscolo in London, until his death there, he enjoyed all the social distinction which the most brilliant circles of the English capital could confer on foreigners of political and literary renown, and experienced all the misery which follows on from a disregard of the first conditions of domestic economy.

His contributions to the Edinburgh Review and Quarterly Review, his dissertations in Italian on the text of Dante Alighieri and Giovanni Boccaccio, and still more his English essays on Petrarch (1821), of which the value was enhanced by Barbarina Brand's admirable translations of some of Petrarch's finest sonnets, heightened his previous fame as a man of letters. However, he was frequently accused of financial ineptitude, and ended up spending time in debtors' prison, which affected his social standing after his release.

According to the History of the County of Middlesex, the scientist and businessman William Allen hired Foscolo to teach Italian at the Quaker school he co-founded, the Newington Academy for Girls. His general bearing in society – as reported by Walter Scott – had not been such as to gain and retain lasting friendships. He died at Turnham Green on 10 September 1827, and was buried at St Nicholas Church, Chiswick, where his restored tomb remains to this day; it refers to him as the "wearied citizen poet", and incorrectly states his age as 50. Forty-four years after his death, on 7 June 1871, his remains were exhumed at the request of the King of Italy and taken to Florence, where with all the pride, pomp and circumstance of a great national mourning, found their final resting-place beside the monuments of Niccolò Machiavelli and Vittorio Alfieri, of Michelangelo and Galileo, in the church of Santa Croce, the pantheon of Italian glory he had celebrated in Dei Sepolcri.

As noted by historian Lucy Riall, the glorification of Ugo Foscolo in the 1870s was part of the effort of the Italian government of this time (successful in completing the Italian unification but at the cost of a head-on confrontation with the Catholic Church) to create a gallery of "secular saints" to compete with those of the Church and sway popular feeling in favor of the newly created Italian state.

== References in modern culture ==
- Ugo Foscolo is the subject of a composition, La fuga di Foscolo, written in 1986 by Italian composer Lorenzo Ferrero.
- His sonnet "Alla sera" appears in the movie La meglio gioventù.
- His house in Edwardes Square in Kensington, west London, has an English Heritage blue plaque.

== Works ==
=== Poetry ===
- Ai novelli repubblicani, ode (1797)
- A Bonaparte liberatore [To Bonaparte the liberator], ode (1797)
- A Luigia Pallavicini caduta da cavallo [To Luigia Pallavicini fallen from a horse], ode (1800)
- All'amica risanata [To the healed (female) friend], ode (1802)
- Non son chi fui, perì di noi gran parte, sonnet (1802)
- Che stai?, sonnet (1802)
- Te nudrice alle Muse, sonnet (1802)
- E tu ne' carmi avrai perenne vita, sonnet (1802)
- Perché taccia il rumor di mia catena, sonnet (1802)
- Così gl'interi giorni in lungo incerto, sonnet (1802)
- Meritamente, però ch'io potei, sonnet (1802)
- Solcata ho fronte, sonnet (1802)
- Alla sera [To the night (evening)], sonnet (1803)
- A Zacinto [To Zakinthos], sonnet (1803)
- Alla Musa [To the Muse], sonnet (1803)
- In morte del fratello Giovanni [In death of brother John], sonnet (1803)
- Dei Sepolcri [Of the sepulchres], carmen (1807)
- Delle Grazie [Of the Graces], short poem (1803–1827, unfinished)

=== Novels ===
- Sesto tomo dell'io (1799–1801)
- Ultime lettere di Jacopo Ortis [The last letters of Jacopo Ortis] (1802)

=== Plays ===
- Tieste [Thyestes] (1797)
- Ajace [Ajax] (1811)
- Ricciarda (1813)
