= Muzi Epifani =

Italian writer and poet (1935–1984)

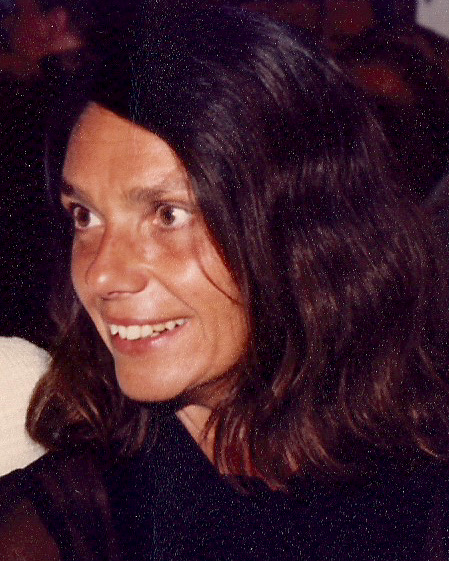
- Born: Maria Luisa Gabriella Epifani; March 18, 1935; Benghazi, Italian Libya
- Died: February 12, 1984 (aged 48); Rome, Italy
- Education: Heidelberg University; Sapienza University of Rome
- Writing career
- Language: Italian

Maria Luisa Gabriella Epifani, better known as Muzi Epifani (March 18, 1935 – February 12, 1984), was an Italian writer and poet.

== Biography ==
Muzi Epifani was born in Benghazi, Libya. She studied literature and philosophy at the Heidelberg University and the University of Rome La Sapienza, where she obtained a degree in aesthetics under the supervision of Emilio Garroni. She was particularly influenced by the Hermeneutics of Hans-Georg Gadamer and the anthropological thought of Ernesto de Martino, whose missions she worked on in Lucania and Salento. During her studies at La Sapienza, she met Alex Duran (to whom she dedicated her novel Pazzi & creature), Gabriele Giannantoni, Enzo Siciliano, and Franco Voltaggio.

Epifani was one of the first Italian writers to develop a distinctive style of female writings alongside Natalia Ginzburg, Luce d'Eramo, Dacia Maraini, Biancamaria Frabotta, Gabriella Sobrino, and Angiola Sacripante. She was a very attentive reader of English female writers such as Katherine Mansfield and, above all, Virginia Woolf.

She collaborated with various newspapers, such as "l'Unità", "l'Avanti!", "Paese Sera". She was considered an environmental activist and "Il Globo" published her own innovative column on the protection of the Italian landscape and environment entitled "Article 9", in reference to the Constitution of the Republic of Italy ("The Republic promotes the development of culture and scientific and technological research, providing safeguard of the landscape and historical and artistic heritage on the Nation"). Epifani also worked as a journalist for RAI, Italy's national public broadcasting company, in the fields of theatre and literature.

In her “Il Premio Viareggio? La mia vita”, Gabriella Sobrino described Muzi Epifani as always "surrounded by her children". They would work during the nights together "when we had finally managed to put to bed the children who would gather around us like puppies in their multi-coloured pyjamas".

In 1976, her comedy "La fuga" (The escape) won the "Young Theatre" Prize. In this satirical play, Epifani intertwined a personal affair with a current political debate concerning the abortion law in Italy. The writer exposed the Italian hypocrisy of people who would permit abortion in the private sphere whilst at the same time criticising it in public. The play has been republished in 2015. The new edition, introduced by the Italian writer and film-director Cristina Comencini, has been presented at the Casa delle letterature in Rome (29 May 2015) by Cristina Comencini, Biancamaria Frabotta, Lucianna Di Lello and Franco Voltaggio, with readings made by the Italian actress Piera degli Esposti.

Epifani is the mother of the film director Francesca Archibugi, of the dramatist Luca Archibugi and of the economist Daniele Archibugi, a professor at Birkbeck College, University of London. She died in Rome.

== Works ==
=== Novels and poetry collections ===
- Muzi Epifani, Cloto. Poesia, Antonio Lalli Editore, Poggibonsi.
- Muzi Epifani, Infanzia di una casalinga emancipata, Prospetti, XII/48, December 1977.
- Muzi Epifani, Pazzi & creature, Rebellato, Venice 1982.
- Muzi Epifani, L'adulterio. (Il lato comico), Nuovi Argomenti, n. 16, October–December 1985.

=== Plays ===
- Muzi Epifani, La fuga, Rome 1976. Republished by La Mongolfiera Editrice e Spettacoli, Doria di Cassano Jonio, 2015 ISBN 978-88-96254-99-8.
- Muzi Epifani and Francesca Pansa, Di madre in madre, Teatro della Maddalena, Rome 1979.
- Muzi Epifani and Gabriella Sobrino, Flou, Rome.
- Muzi Epifani and Gabriella Sobrino, Contrada lunare, Rome.

=== Translations into Italian ===
- Margaret Mead, Maschio e femmina, Il Saggiatore, Milan 1962.
- James H. Leuba, La psicologia del misticismo religioso, Feltrinelli, Milan 1960.

== See also ==
- Hans-Georg Gadamer
- Ernesto de Martino
- Natalia Ginzburg
- Feminism
- Écriture féminine
- Virago Press
