= Ernesto de Martino =

Italian anthropologist, philosopher and historian

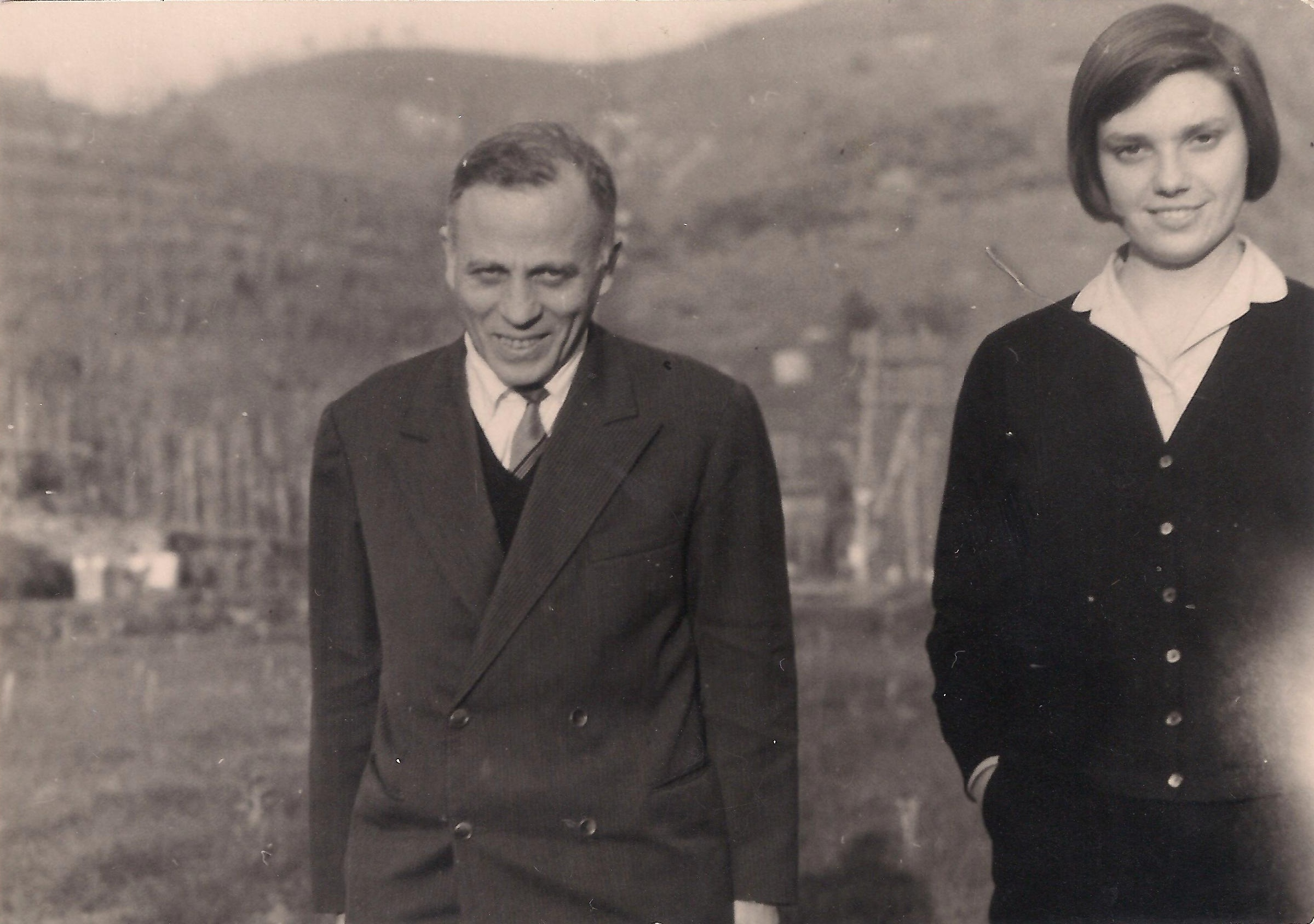
Ernesto de Martino and Muzi Epifani, 1956, during fieldwork in Lucania

Ernesto de Martino (1 December 1908 – 9 May 1965) was an Italian anthropologist, philosopher and historian of religions. He studied with Benedetto Croce and Adolfo Omodeo, and did field research with Diego Carpitella into the funeral rituals of Lucania and tarantism.

== Biography ==
Ernesto de Martino was born in Naples, Italy, where he studied under Adolfo Omodeo, graduating with a degree in philosophy in 1932. His degree thesis, subsequently published, dealt with the historical and philological problem of the Eleusinian Gephyrismi (ritual injuries addressed to the goddess) and provides an important methodological introduction to the concept of religion. Clearly influenced by reading Das Heilige by Rudolf Otto, de Martino preferred to emphasise the choleric nature of the believer, overturning the German scholar's thesis and making it capable of being applied to relations with gods in polytheistic religions and spirits in animist religions.

Attracted by the ideological stance of the regime, for several years de Martino worked on an essay interpreting Fascism as a historically convenient form of civil religion. However, the attempt was insubstantial and the work, still unpublished, was gradually rejected by the author, who subsequently approached left-wing ideas and after the war became a supporter of the Italian Communist Party. At this time, which we now call the "Neapolitan" period, lasting until 1935, de Martino fell under the spell of the personality and work of an archaeologist who was particularly open-minded concerning the ancient history of religions and who was disliked by both the regime and its intellectual opponents: Vittorio Macchioro, known for his Orphic interpretation of the frescoes in the Villa of Mysteries in Pompeii and advocate of a theory of religion understood essentially as experience.

From 1959 until his death, he taught ethnology and history of religions at the University of Cagliari: here, with Alberto Mario Cirese, Clara Gallini, Giulio Angioni and other scholars he founded the Anthropological School of Cagliari.

De Martino has also been a very charismatic mentor and teacher. One of his students, the writer Muzi Epifani, dedicated to him the comedy The Escape. In this work, the protagonist Ernesto discusses the changing role of women in post-industrial society.

== Works about de Martino ==
Flavio A. Geisshuesler wrote the most comprehensive English-language book about Ernesto de Martino to date. Titled The Life and Work of Ernesto de Martino: Italian Perspectives on Apocalypse and Rebirth in the Modern Study of Religion, the book provides a comprehensive study of de Martino's life and work, and places his ideas within the intellectual and socio-political context of his time. Geisshuesler also shows how de Martino's perspective on religion can be compared to other scholars such as Mircea Eliade, Claude Lévi-Strauss, and Clifford Geertz. The book argues that scholarship on religion was influenced by moments of fear of the apocalypse, and that de Martino's approach can help revitalize the field of religious studies. The book is published by Brill in the Numen Book Series.

== Bibliography ==
English translations

- Primitive Magic: the Psychic Powers of Shamans and Sorcerers. Bridport: Prism Press, 1988.
- The Land of Remorse: A Study of Southern Italian Tarantism, translated by Dorothy L. Zinn. London: Free Association Books, 2005.
- Magic: A Theory from the South, translated by Dorothy L. Zinn. Chicago: University of Chicago Press/HAU Books, 2015.
- The End of the World. Cultural Apocalypse and Transcendence, translated by Dorothy L. Zinn. Chicago and London: University of Chicago Press, 2023.

Italian original editions

- 1941, Naturalismo e storicismo nell'etnologia.
- 1948, Il mondo magico: Prolegomeni a una storia del magismo, Torino: Einaudi.
- 1958, Morte e pianto rituale. Dal lamento funebre antico al pianto di Maria.
- 1959, Sud e Magia (on the magic in southern Italian societies).
- 1961, La terra del rimorso.
- 1962, Magia e civiltà. Un'antologia critica fondamentale per lo studio del concetto di magia nella civiltà occidentale.
- 1975, Mondo popolare e magia in Lucania.
- 1993, Scritti minori su religione, marxismo e psicoanalisi (edited by Roberto Altamura e Patrizia Ferretti).
- 1995, Storia e metastoria: i fondamenti di una teoria del sacro (edited and with an introduction by Marcello Massenzio).
- 2002a (1962). Furore Simbolo Valore, Milano: Feltrinelli.
- 2002b (1977). La fine del mondo. Contributo all’analisi delle apocalissi culturali, Torino: Einaudi.
- 2005b Scritti filosofici (edited by Roberto Pastina).
- 2008, Ricerca sui guaritori e la loro clientela (edited by Adelina Talamonti, with an introduction by Clara Gallini).
- 2011, Etnografia del tarantismo pugliese. I materiali della spedizione nel Salento del 1959 (edited by Amalia Signorelli e Valerio Panza, with an introduction and commentary by Amalia Signorelli).

== Works devoted to de Martino ==
- Ferrari, Fabrizio M. (2012). Ernesto de Martino on Religion. The Crisis and the Presence. London and Oakville: Equinox.
- Charuty, Giordana, (2018). « Être ensemble dans la même histoire : l’œuvre-vie d’Ernesto De Martino » in Bérose - Encyclopédie internationale des histoires de l’anthropologie
- Geisshuesler, Flavio A. (2021). The Life and Work of Ernesto De Martino. Leiden: Brill.
