= Pandemonio =

Lombardian folk band

Pandemonio is a Lombardian folk band. Since the year 2000 they have been recovering and rearranging traditional Italian folk songs with elements from other sonorous worlds such as bluegrass, country and Irish music. The sound is based on acoustic guitars, mandolin, flutes and the bowed psaltery colored with polyphony voices.

== Biography ==
The group Pandemonio was formed back in 2000 by Vittorino Gaio (acoustic guitar, mandolino, vocal), Marco Giai-Levra (acoustic guitar, mandolino, vocal) and Christophe Schmuziger (acoustic guitar, mandolino, vocal), who were all former students of well known Beppe Gambetta (flatpick guitar player) and Carlo Aonzo (mandolin player). Since the early notes the group found his path in the beautiful acoustic folk music. The group's main interest is to bring back and to reproduce a repertoire mainly popular, feeding it with arrangements and sonority of typical flatpick instruments. In 2004 Giacomo Cerra (flutes and vocals) and Riccardo Scharf (bowed psaltery) joined the band. Finally the group was completed and became a quintet. Their repertoire include instrumental as well as vocal arrangements by using the accompaniments of the acoustic instruments sweeping from the traditional Italian to the Celtic/Irish and American country music. The group Pandemonio released their first CD in 2006 and had numerous appearances in Italian TV-channels such as Telelombardia, Canale 6, Antenna 3 and Canale 5.in 2006 they released their first ever album

== Band members ==
- Marco Giai-Levra plays guitar, mandolin and voice.
- Christophe Schmuziger plays guitar and voice.
- Vittorino Gaio plays guitar, mandolin and voice.
- Giacomo Cerra plays flute and voice.
- Riccardo Scharf bowed psaltery and voice.

== Albums ==
- il raccolto -the harvest- (2006)
