= Diego Carpitella =

Diego Carpitella (Reggio di Calabria, 12 June 1924 – Rome, 7 August 1990) was an Italian professor of ethnomusicology at D'Annunzio University of Chieti–Pescara and La Sapienza University in Rome. He is considered one of the greatest scholars of Italian folk music and has written and published many essays on the subject. He collaborated with the Centro Nazionale Studi di Musica Popolare from 1952 to 1958, collecting more than 5,000 Italian folk songs. He was also the founding editor of the journal Culture musicali and a co-founder of the cultural magazine Marcatre.
