= Barabàn =

Italian folk group

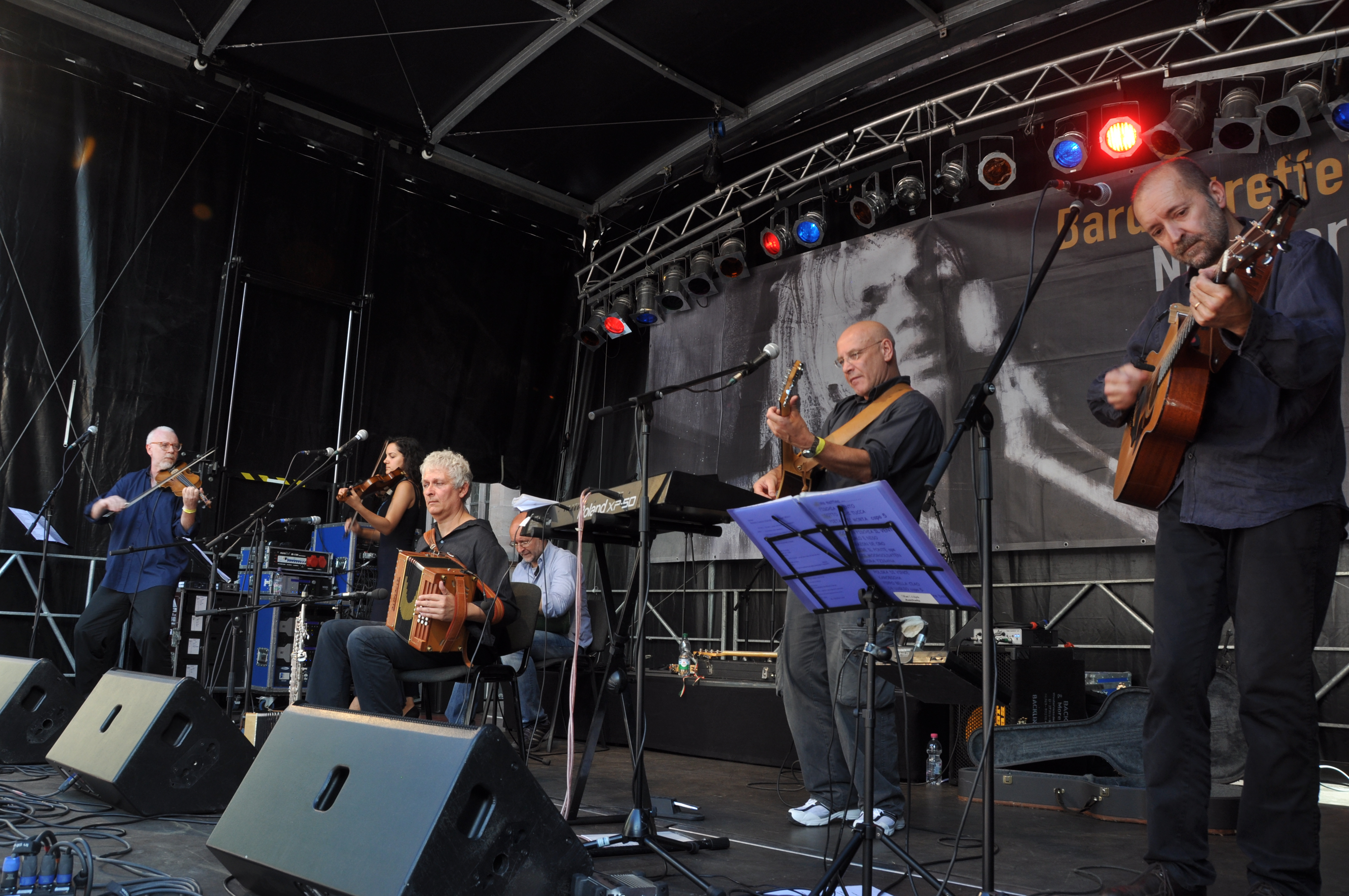
Barabàn at the 2014 Bardentreffen festival in Nuremberg

Barabàn is an Italian folk group focused on the musical traditions of northern Italy, particularly that of the Po Valley for contemporary audience. They are recognized as a notable and widely reviewed folk group in Italy.

Founded in Milan in 1982, the group has released seven albums and has been included in various compilations.

== Members ==
- Vincenzo Caglioti
- Aurelio Citelli
- Giuliano Grasso
- Antonio Neglia
- Alberto Rovelli
- Maddalena Soler

== Discography ==
=== Album ===
- Musa di pelle...pinfio di legno nero (1984)
- Il valzer dei disertori (1987)
- Naquane (1990)
- Live (1994)
- La Santa Notte dell'Oriente (1996)
- Terre di passo (2002)
- Venti^{5} d'Aprile (DVD, 2005)
- Voci di trincea (2015)

=== Collaborations ===
- Cansun del Mag (Canzone del Maggio), of Fabrizio De André, in the album Canti Randagi.
