= Conservative Order =

European political history period from 1815 to 1830

The Conservative Order was the period in political history of Europe after the defeat of Napoleon in 1815. From 1815 to 1830, a conscious program by conservative statesmen, including Metternich and Castlereagh, was put into place to contain revolution and revolutionary forces by restoring the old orders, particularly the previously-ruling aristocracies. On the other hand, in South America, in light of the Monroe Doctrine, the Spanish and Portuguese colonies gained independence.

Britain, Prussia, Russia, and Austria renewed their commitment to prevent any restoration of Bonapartist power and agreed to meet regularly in conferences to discuss their common interests. The period contained the time of the Holy Alliance, a military agreement. The Concert of Europe was the political framework that grew out of the Quadruple Alliance in November 1815.

The Conservative Order had as its main aim to stay in power and regarded the widespread nationalism to be a threat to the aristocracy.

== Congress of Vienna ==
In March 1814 the military coalition of Napoleon's four major opponents (United Kingdom, Austria, Prussia, and Russia) had agreed to remain united not only to defeat France but also to ensure peace after the war. After Napoleon's defeat, the alliance restored the Bourbon monarchy to France and agreed to meet in Vienna, Austria, in September 1814 to arrange a settlement, a meeting that would become known as the Congress of Vienna.

The conservatives' goal at the meeting, led by Prince Klemens von Metternich of Austria, was said to be to re-establish peace in Europe. Metternich and the other four states sought to do so by restoring the old ruling families and to create buffer zones between the major powers. To contain the still-powerful French, the House of Orange-Nassau was put onto the throne in the Netherlands in what had been the Dutch Republic and the Austrian Netherlands (now Belgium). Southeast of France, Piedmont (officially part of the Kingdom of Sardinia) was enlarged. The Bourbon dynasty was restored to France and to Spain as well as a return of other former rulers to the Italian states. To contain the Russian empire, Poland was divided up between Austria, Prussia and Russia. Austria and Prussia were allowed to keep some of their Polish territories, and a new nominally-independent Polish kingdom was established, with the Romanov dynasty of Russia as its hereditary monarchs. Also, the German Confederation was created to replace the Napoleonic Confederation of the Rhine.

During the Congress of Vienna, Napoleon escaped from Elba and launched his unsuccessful "Hundred Days". That ultimately did not disrupt the meeting but as a punishment to the French for allowing Napoleon back in power, they were forced to pay an indemnity, accept an army of occupation for five years and have France's borders returned to those of 1790.

== Conservative ideology ==
The Congress of Vienna was only the beginning of the conservative reaction bent on containing the liberal and nationalist forces unleashed by the French Revolution. Metternich and most of the other participants at the Congress of Vienna were representatives of an ideology known as conservatism, which generally dates back to 1790, when its best-known figure, Edmund Burke, wrote Reflections on the Revolution in France. Burke, however, was not the only kind of conservative. Joseph de Maistre was a very influential spokesperson for a counterrevolutionary and authoritarian conservatism and believed in hereditary monarchies because they would bring "order to society," a commodity in short supply in his eyes after the chaos of the French Revolution. Despite their differences, most conservatives held to some general principles and beliefs:

- Obedience to political authority
- The centrality of organized religion to social order
- Opposition to revolutionary upheavals
- Unwillingness to accept liberal demands for civil liberties and representative government and nationalistic aspirations generated by the French Revolutionary era
- Precedence of community over individual rights
- Structured and ordered society
- Tradition as a guide for an ordered society

Many conservatives such as Metternich were not opposed to reforming governments but said that such changes must be taken gradually and that radical revolutions are aimed, rather than at benefiting the masses, as simply power grabs by the new middle class.

After 1815, the political philosophy of conservatism was supported by hereditary monarchs, government bureaucracies, landowning aristocracies and revived churches (Protestant or Catholic). The conservative forces appeared dominant after 1815 both internationally and domestically.

== Demise (1830–1848) ==
The first liberal reaction against the Conservative Orded established after the congress of Vienna manifested itself in the Revolutions of the 1820s, where Liberal groups started multiple insurrections against absolute monarchies in Portugal, Spain, Italy, the Ottoman Empire (Greece) and the Russian Empire. While the Revolutions had limited success in Portugal (where a constitutional monarchy was instated) and Greece (which became independent from the Ottoman Empire), they were largely crushed in other European countries, resulting in a victory for the Conservative Order.

The Revolutions of 1830 were the first step to the demise of the Conservative Order: in France, the autocratic King Charles X was forced to abdicate and replaced with the liberal Louis Philippe I and a constitutional monarchy was created, while Belgium gained independence from the Netherlands, also becoming a constitutional monarchy. The Revolutions of 1848, while not completely successful, saw the demise of the Conservative Order.
