= Dei Sepolcri =

Poem written by Ugo Foscolo in 1806

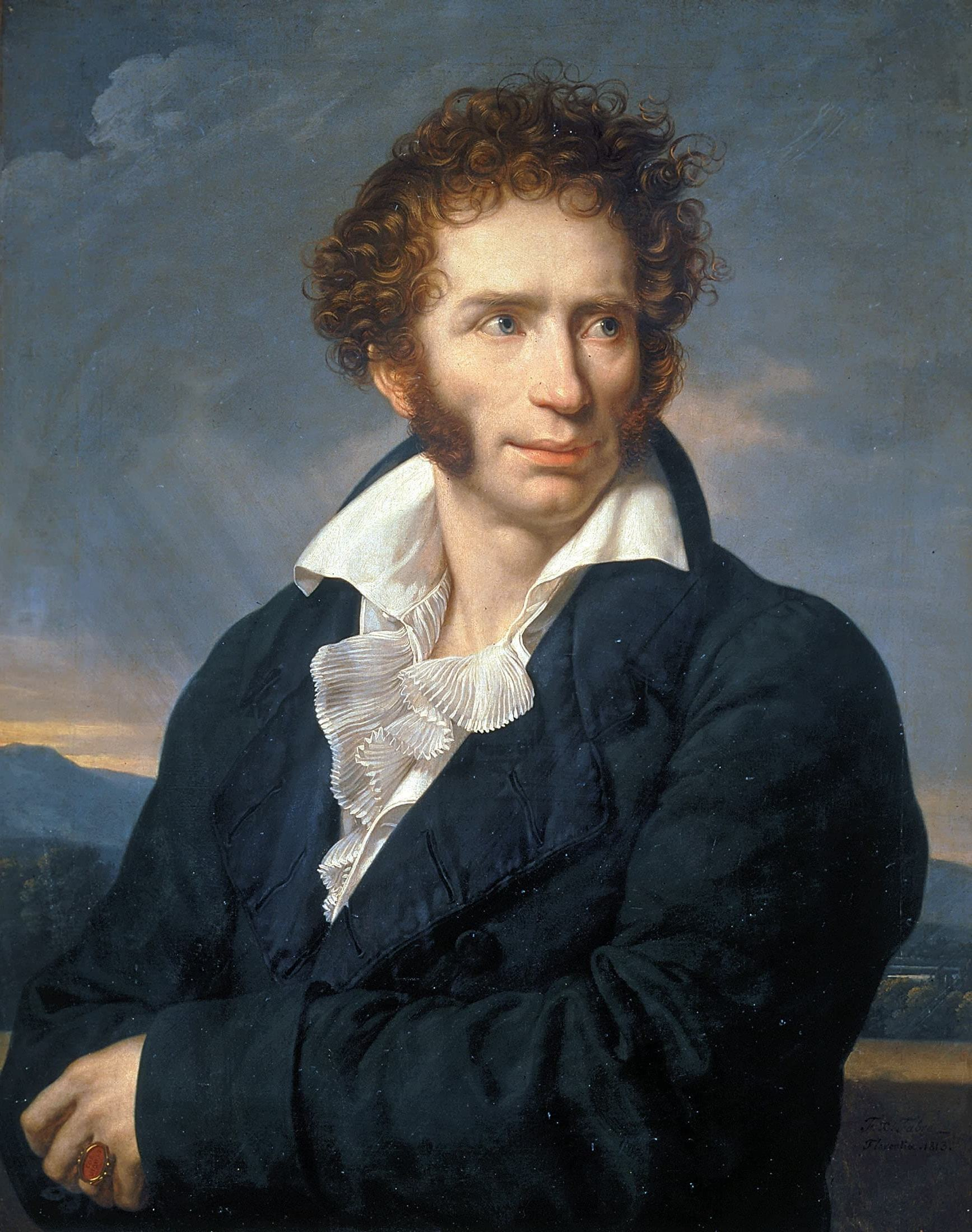
Portrait of Ugo Foscolo by François-Xavier Fabre

"Dei Sepolcri" ("Sepulchres") is a poem written by the Italian poet, Ugo Foscolo, in 1806, and published in 1807. It consists of 295 hendecasyllabic verses. The carme (as the author defined it) is dedicated to another poet, Ippolito Pindemonte, with whom Foscolo had been discussing the recent Napoleonic law regarding tombs. Neoclassical in its idiom, but romantic in its compression, depth of feeling, and unexpected changes of direction, it sets the transforming power of the imagination against materialist rationalism in ways that anticipate and bear comparison with Leopardi.

== Description ==
The idea behind the poem can be traced to 1804, when the Napoleonic edict of Saint-Cloud was issued. On September 5, 1806, the edict was applied to Italy. In short, it stated that all burials must take place outside the city walls; that, for democratic reasons, the burial monuments must all be of the same size; and that their inscriptions would be controlled by a special commission. The edict's implementation caused Foscolo to meditate upon the nature and philosophy of death.

Irreligious, Foscolo did not share the view of his fellow poet Pindemonte, who defended the Christian view, as opposed to the new Enlightenment ideas introduced by the French regime. Even so, Foscolo was critical of the decree, mostly for civic reasons; he acknowledges that human beings aspire to transcend death. Tombs, monuments for fallen heroes and virtuous men from the past, may inspire those living today, including artists and poets. He affirmed the value of tombs as memorials to noble souls or bright intellects. Long after the marble monuments are destroyed by time, those memorialized can survive in artworks they have inspired, and can in turn inspire virtue in new generations.

== English translations ==
- On Sepulchres: An Ode to Ippolito Pindemonte. Translated by Thomas G. Bergin. Bethany, Minn.: Bethany Press. 1971.
- Sepulchres and Other Poems. Translated by J.G. Nichols. Richmond, London: Alma Books. 2015. ISBN 978-1847494665.
