= The Last Letters of Jacopo Ortis =

Novel by Ugo Foscolo

The Last Letters of Jacopo Ortis (Italian: Ultime lettere di Jacopo Ortis) is an epistolary novel written by Ugo Foscolo between 1798 and 1802 and first published later that year. A second edition, with major changes, was published by Foscolo in Zurich (1816) and a third one in London (1817).

The model was Goethe's novel The Sorrows of Young Werther (1774). Another influence is Rousseau's Julie, or the New Heloise (1761). Foscolo's work was also inspired by the political events that occurred in Northern Italy during the Napoleonic period, when the Fall of the Republic of Venice and the subsequent Treaty of Campoformio forced Foscolo to go into exile from Venice to Milan. The autobiographic elements reflect into the novel.

Ortis is composed of letters written by Jacopo to his friend Lorenzo Alderani; the last chapter is the description of the young man's last hours and suicide written by Lorenzo.

== Plot ==
The plot is located in the countryside near Padua and takes place between October 1797 and March 1799. Jacopo Ortis is a patriot who must retreat in a village in Colli Euganei to escape political persecutions. Here he meets a girl, named Teresa, and her family. The two youths fall in love, but this love is impossible, since the girl is fiancée to Odoardo, and Jacopo is in no condition to offer her a marriage.

In despair, Jacopo travels through Italy (then divided into various little states) and visits many cities, among them Florence, with the historical tombs of Santa Croce, Milan, where he meets Giuseppe Parini, Genoa, Ventimiglia. After a deep meditation about nature, history and human fate, he resolves to go back to Veneto. He visits Teresa, then his mother. Finally he commits suicide.

== Legacy ==
Alphonse de Lamartine writes appreciatively of the book in Graziella:

...espèce de Werther, moitié politique, moitié romanesque, où la passion de la liberté de son pays se mêle dans le cœur d’un jeune Italien à sa passion pour une belle Vénitienne. Le double enthousiasme, nourri par ce double feu de l’amant et du citoyen, allume dans l’âme d’Ortis une fièvre dont l’accès, trop fort pour un homme sensible et maladif, produit enfin le suicide. Ce livre, copie littérale mais coloriée et lumineuse du Werther de Gœthe, était alors entre les mains de tous les jeunes hommes qui nourrissaient, comme nous, dans leur âme, ce double rêve de ceux qui sont dignes de rêver quelque chose de grand : l’amour et la liberté. [...] La police de Bonaparte et de Murat proscrivait en vain l’auteur et le livre. L’auteur avait pour asile le cœur de tous les patriotes italiens et de tous les libéraux de l’Europe. Le livre avait pour sanctuaire la poitrine des jeunes gens comme nous ; nous l’y cachions pour en aspirer les maximes.

[... a sort of Werther, half political, half romantic, where the passion for his country's liberty mingles in the heart of a young Italian with his passion for a beautiful Venitian girl. The double excitement, fed by the double fire of lover and citizen, sets off in Ortis' soul a fever which, too strong for a sensitive and sickly man, eventually results in his suicide. This book, a literal copy of Gœthe's Werther, was at the time read by all the young men who cherished, like us, in their soul, the double dream of those who are worthy of dreaming something great: love and liberty. [...] The police of Bonaparte and Murat proscribed the book and its author in vain. The author had as his asylum the hearts of all the young Italian patriots and all the liberals of Europe.]

— Alphonse de Lamartine, Graziella
