= Tre Martelli =

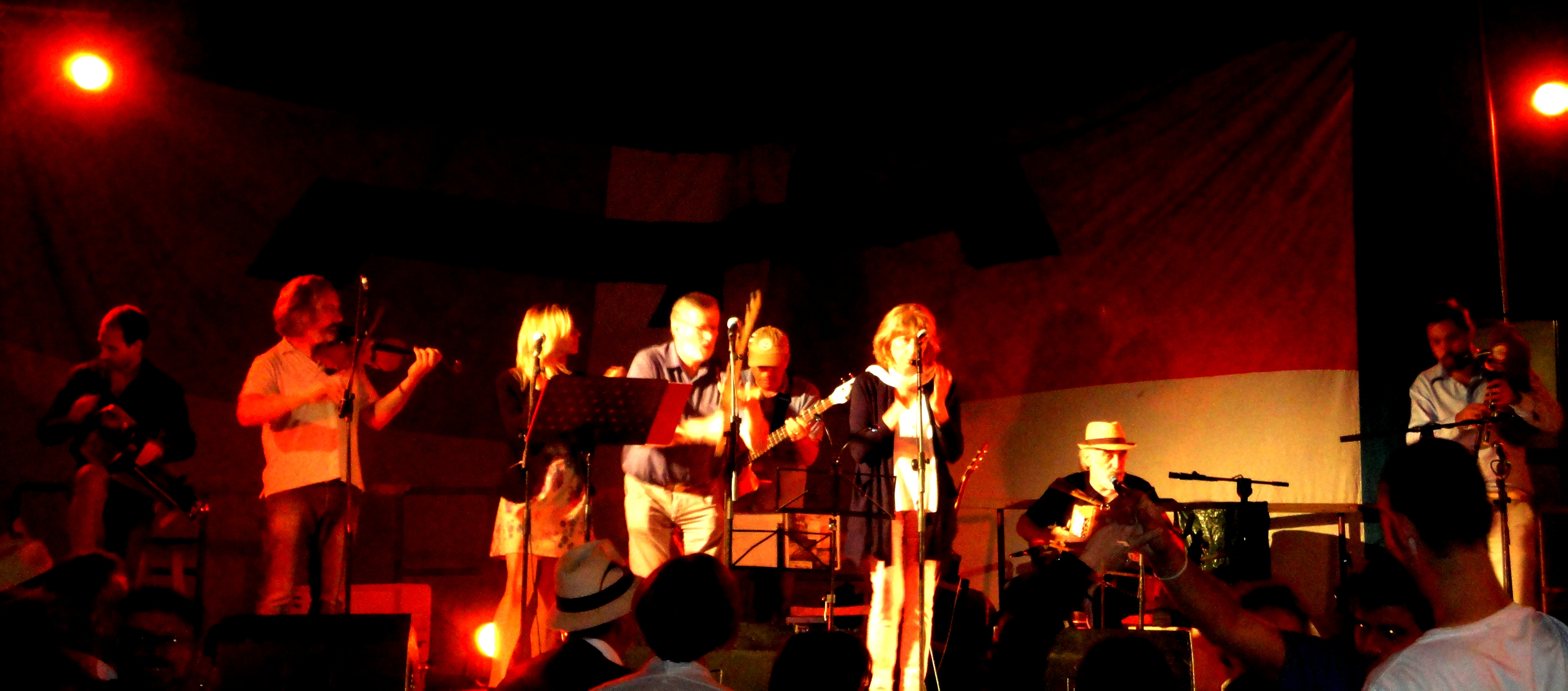
- Tre Martelli 2016

Background information
- Origin: Piedmont, Italy
- Genres: Folk
- Years active: 1977–present
- Labels: Felmay
- Website: www.tremartelli.it

Tre Martelli are an Italian folk and traditional music band. Since 1977, Tre Martelli has been developing its work on the study, recovery and popularization of the traditional musical culture of the region of Piemonte in northern Italy.

They have held concerts and tours, not only in Italy, but also in many parts of Europe. The group had numerous appearances in some European national TV-channels such as RAI, BBC and others.

== Discography ==
- 1978 Danza di luglio - demotape
- 1982 Trata Birata – Trata Birata, CL001
- 1985 Giacu Trus – Pentagramma, LPPG 218
- 1987 La Tempesta – Trata Birata, TM 003
- 1991 Brüze Carvè – Trata Birata, TM 005
- 1995 Omi e Paiz – Robi Droli, rdc 5024
- 2000 Car der Steili – Felmay, 8023
- 2002 Semper Viv (antologia) – Felmay, 8048
- 2005 Tra Cel e Tèra – Felmay, 8097
- 2012 Cantè 'r paròli – omaggio a Giovanni Rapetti – Felmay, 8193
- 2014 Tre Martelli & Gianni Coscia Ansema – Felmay, 8219
- 2017 40 gir 1977–2017 – Felmay, 8247
- 2021 Concerto di Natale – Felmay, 8279

== Anthology ==
- 1989 Folkautore – Madau dischi
- 1995 Roots Music Atlas – Robi Droli
- 1996 Gente del Piemonte – De Agostini
- 1997 Roots Music Atlas – Italia 2 – Robi Droli
- 1997 Musica popolare in Piemonte (1957–1997) – Regione Piemonte
- 1998 Tradizione popolare e linguaggio colto nell'Ottocento e Novecento piemontese – Ass. Cult. Trata Birata
- 2001 Isolafolk-Decennale – Isolafolk
- 2002 Feestival Gooik 1996–2001 – DKdisc
- 2002 Capodanno celtico "Samonios" in musica – Divo 00006
- 2002 Omaggio al Piemonte vol.2 – Regione Piemonte
- 2002 Tribù Italiche "Piemonte" – WorldMusic 028
- 2003 Italie:instruments de la musique populaire – Buda Records
- 2003 Tradicionarius 2003 XVI ediciò Discmedi – Barcelona
- 2004 Piemonte. Antologia della musica antica e moderna – Dejavu Retro
- 2004 Italia 3 – Atlante di musica tradizionale – Dunya records
- 2005 Piemonte World – The stars look very different today – Regione Piemonte
- 2005 Gong – Tradizioni in movimento – Gong

== Bibliography ==
1987 – Livio Tesio La riproposta della canzone tradizionale in Piemonte
1990 – Giovanni Sisto Alessandria una provincia diversa
1995 – Franco Castelli La danza contro il tiranno
1996 – AAVV The rough guide to world music
1997 – Franco Lucà & Maurizio Martinotti Musica popolare in Piemonte
1998 – Michele L. Straniero Antologia della canzone popolare piemontese tra settecento e novecento
2002 – Ivo Franchi e Ezio Guaitamacchi 100 dischi ideali per capire la world music
2003 – Luca Ferrari Folk geneticamente modificato
2003 – Ugo Boccassi & Franco Rangone (IO) lui, gli altri e la musica
2005 – AAVV 80 anni di storia alessandrina
2014 – AAVV (a cura di Noretta Nori) Viaggio nella danza popolare in Italia
2014 – Stefano Baldi Le fonti musicali in Piemonte, IV volume, Regione Piemonte
2020 – Maurizio Berselli Storie folk, il folk revival nell'Italia settentrionale e centrale raccontato dai protagonisti, Artestampa, 2020
