= La Lionetta =

Folk band from Turin, Italy

La Lionetta is an acoustic band of Turin, Piedmont. The group was started in 1977 as a folk group. After the two first LPs, "Danze e ballate dell'area celtica italiana" and "Il gioco del Diavolo", La Lionetta played in the Principal Folk Festival in Europe (Nyon, Salzburg, Murienne...)

The group broke up in 1987. After a long period the group has a new life with two of the old components and new friends. Now, the sound is more influenced by Arabian and Balcanic music and the songs are written by the band.
