= Giorgio Nataletti =

Giorgio Nataletti (12 June 1907 - 16 July 1972) was an Italian ethnomusicologist, composer, pioneer in Italian radio and film, recording studio executive, and radio broadcaster and executive. He began his career serving as the music director for Italy's first radio station in 1922-1923, and later was a radio broadcaster for the RAI programme "Cronache Italiane del Turismo" from 1936-1943. He also served as that programme's music director from 1948 until 1955, when he was appointed artistic director of the Italian branch of RCA Records. He composed scores to some of the first sound films made in Italy in 1930-1931. He was the first director of the Ethnomusicological Archives at the National Academy of Santa Cecilia in Rome, where he was a professor from 1940 through 1972. He was in charge of a vast project from 1948 to 1972 to record traditional Italian music. It was done under the auspices of RAI, the Italian Radio and Television agency. The results are preserved in the RAI archives as well as those of the National Academy of Santa Cecilia.

== Life and career ==
Giorgio Nataletti was born in Rome on 12 June 1907. He was educated at the Pesaro Conservatory, where he earned a diploma in music composition, studying that subject at the conservatory with Vincenzo di Donato. A pioneer in radio in Italy, he served as music director of Italy's first radio station, Radio Araldo, in 1922-1923. He was a broadcaster for RAI, serving in the capacity for more than 1,000 broadcasts on the programme "Cronache Italiane del Turismo" from 1936 to 1943. He later returned to that program as music director from 1948 until 1955, when he was appointed Artistic Director of the Italian branch of RCA Records. He remained in that role until his death in 1972. He also worked as a consultant for the Italian record label Fonit Cetra.

As an ethnomusicologist, Nataletti published extensively on Italian folk music and was an active member of the International Folk Music Council and the UNESCO commission on Italian folk music. He did ethnographic research in Italy, beginning his research in 1926 by making transcripts and tapes of music in the Maritime Alps and Tunisia. He spent ten years on this research, not completing it until 1936. He was a professor at the Tunisia Conservatory in 1932-1934. From 1936 through 1961, he was director of Le Arti e le Tradizioni Popolari dell’OND (known by the acronym ENAL), and from 1947 through 1952, he served as secretary of the Comitato Nazionale delle Arti Popolari. He was the first director of the Ethnomusicological Archives at the National Academy of Santa Cecilia (NASC) in Rome; an archive he founded in 1948. He joined the staff at NASC in 1940 as a professor of folk music, a position he held until he was named a professor of music history at that same school in 1961. He held this latter post until his death in 1972.

As a composer, Nataletti used Italian folk music as an inspiration within his writing, with his composition blending Western classical techniques with Italian folk song material. His compositions were mainly written in the 1920s and encompassed choral and orchestral works, some of them large-scale compositions, as well as chamber music. He also composed music for some of the first sound films made in Italy, working as a film score composer for Istituto Luce in 1930-1931.

Nataletti died in Rome on 16 July 1972.
