= Contardo Ferrini =

Italian Franciscan tertiary and legal scholar beatified by the Catholic Church

Blessed Contardo Ferrini, T.O.S.F.
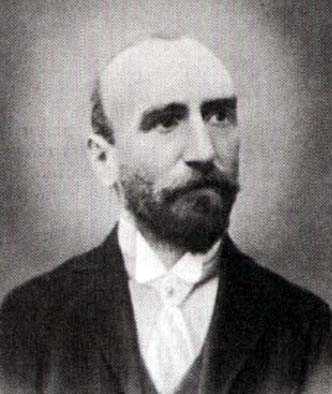
- Born: 5 April 1859; Milan, Kingdom of Lombardy–Venetia, Austrian Empire
- Died: 17 October 1902 (aged 43); Suna, Novara, Kingdom of Italy
- Venerated in: Catholic Church (Third Order of Saint Francis)
- Beatified: 13 April 1947, Saint Peter's Square, Vatican City, by Pope Pius XII
- Major shrine: Chapel of the Università Cattolica del Sacro Cuore, Milan, Italy
- Feast: 17 October; 22 October (in the Archdiocese of Berlin)

Contardo Ferrini, T.O.S.F. (5 April 1859 – 17 October 1902) was a noted Italian jurist and legal scholar. He was also a fervent Roman Catholic, who lived a devout life of prayer and service to the poor as a Franciscan tertiary. He has been beatified by the Catholic Church.

== Life ==
He was born on 5 April 1859 in Milan, Italy, to Rinaldo Ferrini and Luigia Buccellati. He was baptized at the same baptismal font where Frédéric Ozanam, also a native of Milan, had been baptized 46 years prior. After receiving his First Holy Communion at the age of twelve, he joined the Confraternity of the Blessed Sacrament.

Rinaldo Ferrini, a professor of mathematics and science, taught his son at an early age. Contardo learned to speak several languages. His love for the Catholic faith caused friends to nickname him "Saint Aloysius" (after Aloysius Gonzaga). He entered the University of Pavia at age seventeen and, two years later, he was appointed dean of students. At age twenty-one he became a doctor of the law at the university. His doctoral thesis, which related Penal Law to Homeric poetry, was the basis of his being awarded a scholarship to the University of Berlin, where he specialized in Roman-Byzantine law, a field in which he became internationally recognized as an expert.

During Ferrini's stay in Berlin, he wrote of his excitement at receiving the Sacrament of Penance for the first time in a foreign land. The experience brought home to him, he wrote, the universality of the Roman Catholic Church.

Upon his return to Italy, Ferrini was a lecturer in the universities at Messina, Modena, and Pavia. He received his first professorship at the young age of twenty-six. Contardo attempted to discern his vocation whether as a secular priest, a member of a religious order, or as a married person. Ultimately, he fulfilled his vocation as an unmarried layperson. He vowed himself to God, became a member of the Third Order of St. Francis in 1886, and was also a member of the Saint Vincent de Paul Society, to which he had been introduced by his father, a member of the Society.

As a faculty member at University of Pavia, Ferrini was considered an expert in Roman Law. Over the course of his career he published books, articles and reviews. He taught for a time at the University of Paris. He later became a canon lawyer in addition to being a civil lawyer.

An unconfirmed anecdote about Ferrini is that he was asked to attend a dinner party and, once there, found it tedious. His resort was to invite all the guests to join him in praying the rosary.

In 1900, Ferrini developed a heart lesion. In autumn 1902, in order to rest, he went to his country home in the village of Suna, Novara, (now part of the commune of Verbania, Province of Verbano-Cusio-Ossola), on the shores of Lake Maggiore. While there, he became ill with typhus. He died at age forty-three on 17 October 1902. Residents of Suna immediately declared him a saint. His colleagues at the University of Pavia wrote letters in which he was described as a saint.

== Legacy ==
Ferrini's works are considered a mileston in the history of Roman law historiography. The German historian Theodor Mommsen told the philologist Bartolomeo Nogara, in August 1902 (just before Ferrini's death), that "the nineteenth century has been called the century of Savigny, but the twentieth will be known as that of Ferrini. By the labours of Ferrini the primacy of Roman law research has passed from Germany to Italy; nor are we jealous of the result."

== Veneration ==
In 1909 Pope Pius X authorized Cardinal Andrea Carlo Ferrari, the Archbishop of Milan, to open a process to promote Ferrini's canonization. He was subsequently declared Venerable by Pope Pius XI and he was beatified by Pope Pius XII on 13 April 1947. His body is venerated in a chapel of Milan's Catholic University. Some sources cite his feast day and celebration of memory by Franciscans on 20 October.

Ferrini is the patron saint of schools, colleges, universities, professors and Homeric scholarship.

== Selected works ==
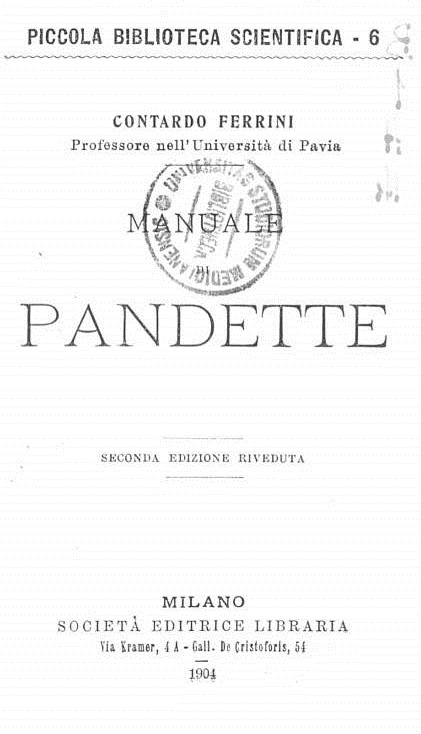
Manuale di Pandette, 1904

- Quid conferat ad iuriscriminalis historiam Homericorum Hesiodeorumque poëmatum studium (in Latin). Berlin: Apud S. Calvary. 1881.
- "Note critiche al libro IV dello Pseudo-Teofilo", Rendiconti dell'Istituto Lombardo, II s., XVII, 1884, 891 ff.
- "Delle origini della Parafrasi greca delle Istituzioni". Archivio Giuridico. XXXVII: 353 ff. 1886.
- Diritto penale romano. Teorie generali (in Italian). Milan: Hoepli. 1899.
- "Sulle fonti delle Istituzioni di Giustiniano". Bullettino dell'Istituto di Diritto Romano. XIII: 101 ff. 1901.
- Manuale di Pandette (in Italian). Milano: Società Editrice Libraria. 1904.
- Diritto penale romano. Esposizione storica e dottrinale (in Italian). Rome: L'Erma di Bretschneider. 1976. ISBN 978-8870622669.

== Quotes ==
"Our life must reach out towards the Infinite, and from that source we must draw whatever we can expect of merit and dignity."

"If on any particular day we do nothing more than give a little joy to a neighbor, that day will not be wasted. For we have succeeded in giving comfort to an immortal soul."

"If the way that leads to Jesus' Heart is arduous and long, have one look at the heart of this Mother, and you will have courage!"

== See also ==
- Third Order of St. Francis

== Bibliography ==
- Jarrett, Bede (1933). Contardo Ferrini. London: Alexander Ouseley.
- Fagioli Vercellone, Guido (1997). "FERRINI, Contardo". Dizionario Biografico degli Italiani (in Italian). Vol. 47: Ferrero–Filonardi. Rome: Institute of the Italian Encyclopaedia. ISBN 978-88-12-00032-6.
