= Scarfiotti =

Scarfiotti is an Italian surname. Notable people with the surname include:

- Ferdinando Scarfiotti (1941–1994), Italian art director and production designer
- Ludovico Scarfiotti (1933–1968), Italian Formula One and sports car driver
