= Marco Fusi =

Marco Fusi may refer to:

- Marco Fusi (clarinetist) (born 1972), Italian clarinetist and composer
- Marco Fusi (violinist), Italian violinist, violist and viola d'amore player
