= Pigs Have Wings (film) =

1977 Italian drama film

- Film poster
- Directed by: Paolo Pietrangeli
- Written by: Marco Lombardo Radice; Lidia Ravera
- Produced by: Mario Orfini
- Starring: Franco Bianchi
- Cinematography: Dario Di Palma
- Edited by: Ruggero Mastroianni
- Music by: Giovanna Marini
- Production companies: Eidoscope S.r.l. Uschi S.r.l.
- Distributed by: Titanus
- Release date: 1977
- Running time: 102 minutes
- Country: Italy
- Language: Italian

Pigs Have Wings (Italian: Porci con le ali) is a 1977 Italian drama film directed by Paolo Pietrangeli and based on the 1976 book of the same name by Lidia Ravera and Marco Lombardo Radice. It was entered into the 27th Berlin International Film Festival.

The novel is about the life style, political attitudes, and sexual behavior of left-wing Italian youth. The book was presented as a factual account. In Italy, the book was originally confiscated as pornographic, but it eventually became a best seller.

== Plot ==
Rocco and Antonia are two left–wing, politically active 15-year-old students. Neither can tolerate the conformism of their parents. They meet, fall in love and discover sex. But the relationship doesn't last. Following other experiences, including homosexual ones, and the occupation of their school, the school year comes to an end and they take different paths.

== Cast ==
- Franco Bianchi as Rocco
- Lou Castel as Marcello
- Benedetta Fantoli
- Susanna Javicoli as Carla, Marcello's wife
- Marco Lucantoni
- Cristiana Mancinelli as Antonia
- Anna Nogara

== Censorship ==
In Italy, the book was originally confiscated as pornographic, but it eventually became a best seller.

In 1977, deputy prosecutor Claudio Vitalone ordered the seizure the film on charges of obscenity, when it was screened at the Ariston Cinema in Rome. It was released in theaters in the fall of 1977 with a R rating. It was confiscated by the censors, but was then re-released with the same rating. The film was broadcast a year later on private TV channels.

The authors of the novel criticized the film, believing it strayed from their literary intentions, with too many ideological additions and many parts – especially vocal ones – that weren't in the original narrative. Pietrangeli took responsibility for the chaotic screenplay, that was riddled with narrative holes, slow–paced, and unengaging. The narrative outlined in the novel was about the right of two teenagers not to take themselves too seriously, despite the politically charged period. The film betrayed that approach, because Rocco and Antonia have a unique relationship, influenced by political ideas, within collectives, private radio stations, and extra-parliamentary influences. The tone of the film is dark, almost anguished, the complete opposite of the erotic novel.

The film is memorable for some scenes bordering on pornographic, and it became a cult classic as a ghost film; apart from a few appearances on free-to-air television in the early 1980s.

== Reception ==
Film critic Gordiano Lupi said "Cristiana Mancinelli isn't the best; Franco Bianchi does a fine job playing a clumsy teenager, being excessively awkward, especially in the erotic scenes; the only real actor is Lou Castel." He went on to say "there's little redeeming about the story; the atmosphere of the historical period is reproduced quite faithfully, with an almost documentary like approach; the mix of politics and sex is unbalanced in favor of the former – unlike the book – and the character of Rocco isn't enough to redress the overly ideological script." He concluded that "homosexuality is addressed without irony and in a fairly serious manner, with a modern approach and no preconceptions whatsoever; the adolescent crises are believable, and the best parts see the boys disinterested in politics and dedicating themselves to sex and masturbation."

== See also ==
- Cinema of Italy
- List of Italian films of 1977
- List of LGBTQ-related films of 1977
- When pigs fly

== Sources ==
- Healey, Robin (1998). Twentieth-century Italian Literature in English Translation: An Annotated Bibliography 1929-1997. University of Toronto Press. ISBN 978-0-8020-0800-8.
