= Abe Schwartz discography =

The klezmer violinist and bandleader Abe Schwartz recorded prolifically in the 1910s and 1920s.

name of formation	track n°	track name	track length	year of recording	album	label	catalogue #	country	year of publishing
Jacob Hoffman & the Kandel's Orchestra	1	Doïna and Hora [Hebrew Dance]	3:06		Klezmer: Early Yiddish Instrumental Music 1908–1927	Arhoolie Records	7034	USA	1996
Orchestra Orfeon	2	Sirba	3:37		Klezmer: Early Yiddish Instrumental Music 1908–1927	Arhoolie Records	7034	USA	1996
Abe Schwartz's Orchestra	3	Mechutonim Tantz	3:20		Klezmer: Early Yiddish Instrumental Music 1908–1927	Arhoolie Records	7034	USA	1996
Naftule Brandwein	4	Kalliarash	3:16		Klezmer: Early Yiddish Instrumental Music 1908–1927	Arhoolie Records	7034	USA	1996
Max Leibowitz & Phil Friedmann	5	Yiddish Chusedel	3:35		Klezmer: Early Yiddish Instrumental Music 1908–1927	Arhoolie Records	7034	USA	1996
Orchestra Goldberg	6	Kleftico Vlachiko	3:25		Klezmer: Early Yiddish Instrumental Music 1908–1927	Arhoolie Records	7034	USA	1996
Abe Schwartz's Orchestra & Naftule Brandwein	7	Fihren Die Mechutonim Aheim (Tanz)	3:38		Klezmer: Early Yiddish Instrumental Music 1908–1927	Arhoolie Records	7034	USA	1996
Mishka Ziganoff	8	Koilen (Dance)	3:32		Klezmer: Early Yiddish Instrumental Music 1908–1927	Arhoolie Records	7034	USA	1996
Abe Schwartz's Orchestra & Boibriker Kapelle	9	Ch'sidishe Nigunim	2:58		Klezmer: Early Yiddish Instrumental Music 1908–1927	Arhoolie Records	7034	USA	1996
H. Steiner	10	Haneros Haluli	2:52		Klezmer: Early Yiddish Instrumental Music 1908–1927	Arhoolie Records	7034	USA	1996
Joseph Moskowitz	11	Sadegurer Chused'l	3:01		Klezmer: Early Yiddish Instrumental Music 1908–1927	Arhoolie Records	7034	USA	1996
S. Kosch	12	Doina, Pt. 1	3:19		Klezmer: Early Yiddish Instrumental Music 1908–1927	Arhoolie Records	7034	USA	1996
S. Kosch	13	Doina, Pt. 2	2:45		Klezmer: Early Yiddish Instrumental Music 1908–1927	Arhoolie Records	7034	USA	1996
Naftule Brandwein's Orchestra	14	Turkische Yalle Vey Uve (Tanz)	3:22		Klezmer: Early Yiddish Instrumental Music 1908–1927	Arhoolie Records	7034	USA	1996
Abe Schwartz's Orchestra	15	Sadigurer-Chusid	3:14		Klezmer: Early Yiddish Instrumental Music 1908–1927	Arhoolie Records	7034	USA	1996
Abe Schwartz's Orchestra & Yiddisher Orkester	16	Biem Reben's Sideh	3:35		Klezmer: Early Yiddish Instrumental Music 1908–1927	Arhoolie Records	7034	USA	1996
Naftule Brandwein	17	Oi, Tate, S'Is Gut	3:14		Klezmer: Early Yiddish Instrumental Music 1908–1927	Arhoolie Records	7034	USA	1996
Abe Schwartz's Orchestra	18	Schweir und Schwiger Tanz	3:13		Klezmer: Early Yiddish Instrumental Music 1908–1927	Arhoolie Records	7034	USA	1996
Joseph Solinski	19	Rumänische Fantasien, Pt. 1	2:44		Klezmer: Early Yiddish Instrumental Music 1908–1927	Arhoolie Records	7034	USA	1996
Belf's Rumanian Orchestra	20	Khosidl	2:42		Klezmer: Early Yiddish Instrumental Music 1908–1927	Arhoolie Records	7034	USA	1996
Abe Schwartz's Orchestra	21	Der Shtiller Bulgar	3:07		Klezmer: Early Yiddish Instrumental Music 1908–1927	Arhoolie Records	7034	USA	1996
Hochman's Orchestra	22	A Mitzve Tenzel	3:04		Klezmer: Early Yiddish Instrumental Music 1908–1927	Arhoolie Records	7034	USA	1996
Abe Schwartz's Orchestra	23	National Hora, Pt. 2	3:27		Klezmer: Early Yiddish Instrumental Music 1908–1927	Arhoolie Records	7034	USA	1996
Abe Schwartz's Orchestra	24	Sher, Pt. 2	3:07		Klezmer: Early Yiddish Instrumental Music 1908–1927	Arhoolie Records	7034	USA	1996

== Singles & EPs ==
This section presents some Phonograph recordings of Abe Schwartz's Orchestra between from 1919 until 1946.

name of formation	disc name	side	track name	written by	year of recording	city	year of publishing	country	Label	catalogue#	format
Abe Schwartz's Orchestra	Simchas Torah Noch Die Hakofes / Mazel Tov Mechutonim	A	Simchas Torah Noch Die Hakofes (means: "Dancing After the Torah Celebration")		April 1919	Ney York City	1919	USA	Columbia Graphophone Company	E4281	Shellac, 78 RPM, 10"
Abe Schwartz's Orchestra	Simchas Torah Noch Die Hakofes / Mazel Tov Mechutonim	B	Mazel Tov Mechutonim (means: "Good Luck, In-Laws")		April 1919	New York City	1919	USA	Columbia Graphophone Company	E4281	Shellac, 78 RPM, 10"
Abe Schwartz's Orchestra	Der Rebbi Hot Geheisen Freilich Zain / A Tanz Far Alle Mechutonim	A	Der Rebbi Hot Geheisen Freilich Zain (means "The Rabbi Told Us To Be Happy")		November 1919	New York City	1921	USA	Columbia Graphophone Company	E7320	Shellac, 10", 78 RPM
Abe Schwartz's Orchestra	Der Rebbi Hot Geheisen Freilich Zain / A Tanz Far Alle Mechutonim	B	A Tanz Far Alle Mechutonim (means "A Dance For All In-Laws")		November 1919	New York City	1921	USA	Columbia Graphophone Company	E7320	Shellac, 10", 78 RPM
George Wagner with Abe Schwartz's Orchestra	Anniversary Waltz / Bésame Mucho	A	Anniversary Waltz	[Uncredited] – Chaim Tauber, Ion Ivanovici	April 1, 1947	New York City	May 1947	USA	Apollo Records (2)	144	Shellac, 10", 78 RPM
George Wagner with Abe Schwartz's Orchestra	Anniversary Waltz / Bésame Mucho	B	Bésame Mucho	Consuelo Velázquez	April 1, 1947	New York City	May 1947	USA	Apollo Records (2)	144	Shellac, 10", 78 RPM
