= Giovanna Marini =

Italian singer and songwriter (1937–2024)

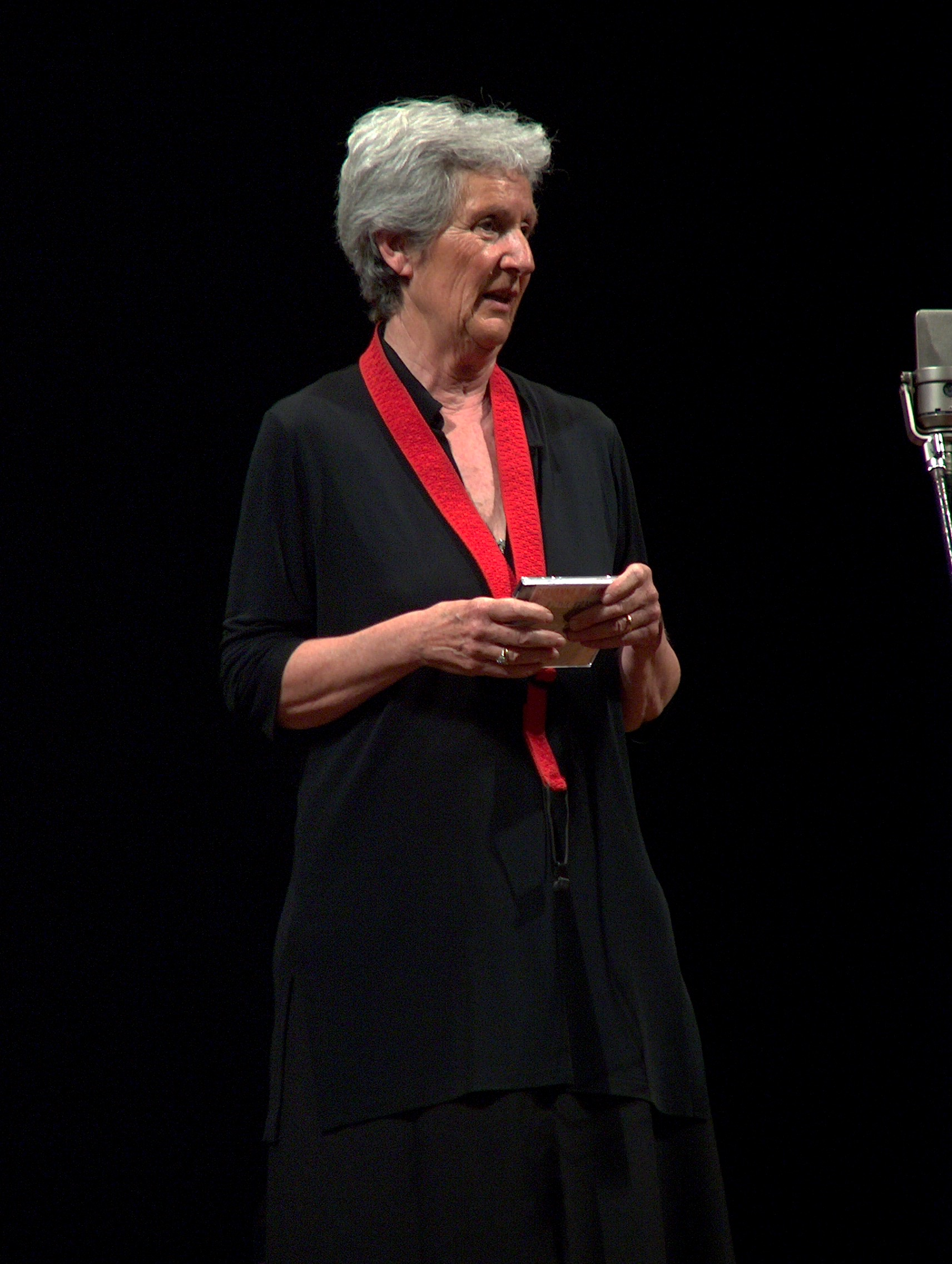
- Marini in 2003

Background information
- Born: Giovanna Salviucci; 19 January 1937; Rome, Italy
- Died: 8 May 2024 (aged 87) Rome, Italy
- Genres: Folk
- Occupation: Singer-songwriter
- Instruments: Vocals, guitar
- Years active: 1959–2024
- Labels: I dischi del sole, Vedette, Le chant du monde, Nota, Columbia, Sony BMG, Ala Bianca, Igloo
- Website: www.giovannamarini.it

Giovanna Marini (born Giovanna Salviucci; 19 January 1937 – 8 May 2024) was an Italian singer, songwriter, researcher and ethnomusicologist. Marini founded the School of Popular Music of Testaccio, and has been called "the voice of Italian folk song".

== Biography ==
Marini was born in Rome in a family of musicians. Her father, Giovanni Salviucci (1907–1937), was a composer who studied with Ottorino Respighi. Her mother, Ida Parpagliolo (1904–1994), was a pianist. Marini studied classical guitar with Andrés Segovia and in 1959 she graduated from the Conservatorio Santa Cecilia in Rome.

In the early 1960s, she befriended artists and writers who were passionate about Italian popular traditions, such as Pier Paolo Pasolini, Dario Fo, Italo Calvino and Roberto Leydi. In the mid-1960s, she married Pino Marini, a nuclear physicist. The couple relocated for a few years in Boston, an experience that later informed Giovanna Marini's 1966 album Vi parlo dell'America (Let me tell you about America). An ardent communist, Marini identified in contemporary folk music the perfect vehicle to express her political ideas. Over the course of her career Marini wrote many protest song lyrics (many of them sung by fellow musician Paolo Pietrangeli), embracing the themes of social justice that characterized the Italian '68 period and other political issues.

Marini founded the School of Popular Music of Testaccio during the 1970s. She wrote many pieces for cinema and theatre.

From 1991 to 2002 she taught ethnomusicology at the University of Vincennes (Paris-VIII).

Marini died in Rome on 8 May 2024, at the age of 87. After her death, she was described as "the voice of Italian folk song" and the "Italian Joan Baez".

== Awards ==
- 1999 – Targa Tenco: best singer (with Francesco De Gregori) for Il fischio del vapore

== Discography ==
=== EP and singles ===
- 1963: Lu picurare - canzoni popolari abruzzesi (45 rpm)
- 1965: La disispirata - canzoni popolari sarde (45 rpm)
- 1967: Ciò che voi non-dite/La linea rossa (EP, with I.Della Mea)
- 1977: Ho bisogno di te/Se si sa di volare (EP)

=== Albums ===
- 1965: Le canzoni di Bella ciao
- 1966: Vi parlo dell'America
- 1967: Chiesa Chiesa
- 1968: Lunga vita allo spettacolo. Viva Voltaire e Montesquieu
- 1971: Controcanale '70
- 1972: La Nave. La Creatora
- 1969: La vivazione
- 1974: L'eroe (ballata nuova)
- 1975: I treni per Reggio Calabria
- 1978: Correvano coi carri
- 1979: La grande madre impazzita 1
- 1979: La grande madre impazzita 2
- 1980: Cantate de tous les jours
- 1982: Cantate de tous les jours vol. 2
- 1983: Quatuor vocal
- 1984: Le cadeau de l'empereur
- 1985: Pour Pier Paolo
- 1986: Requiem.Cantata delle cinque stanze
- 1996: Oresteia Aischylos (Igloo)
- 1998: Musiche di scena
- 1999: Si bemolle
- 2002: Il fischio del vapore (with Francesco De Gregori)
- 2003: Buongiorno e buonasera
- 2004: Passioni
- 2005: Nostra patria è il mondo intero
- 2006: Antologia

== See also ==
- Nuovo Canzoniere Italiano
