= Bella ciao =

Italian anti-fascist folk song

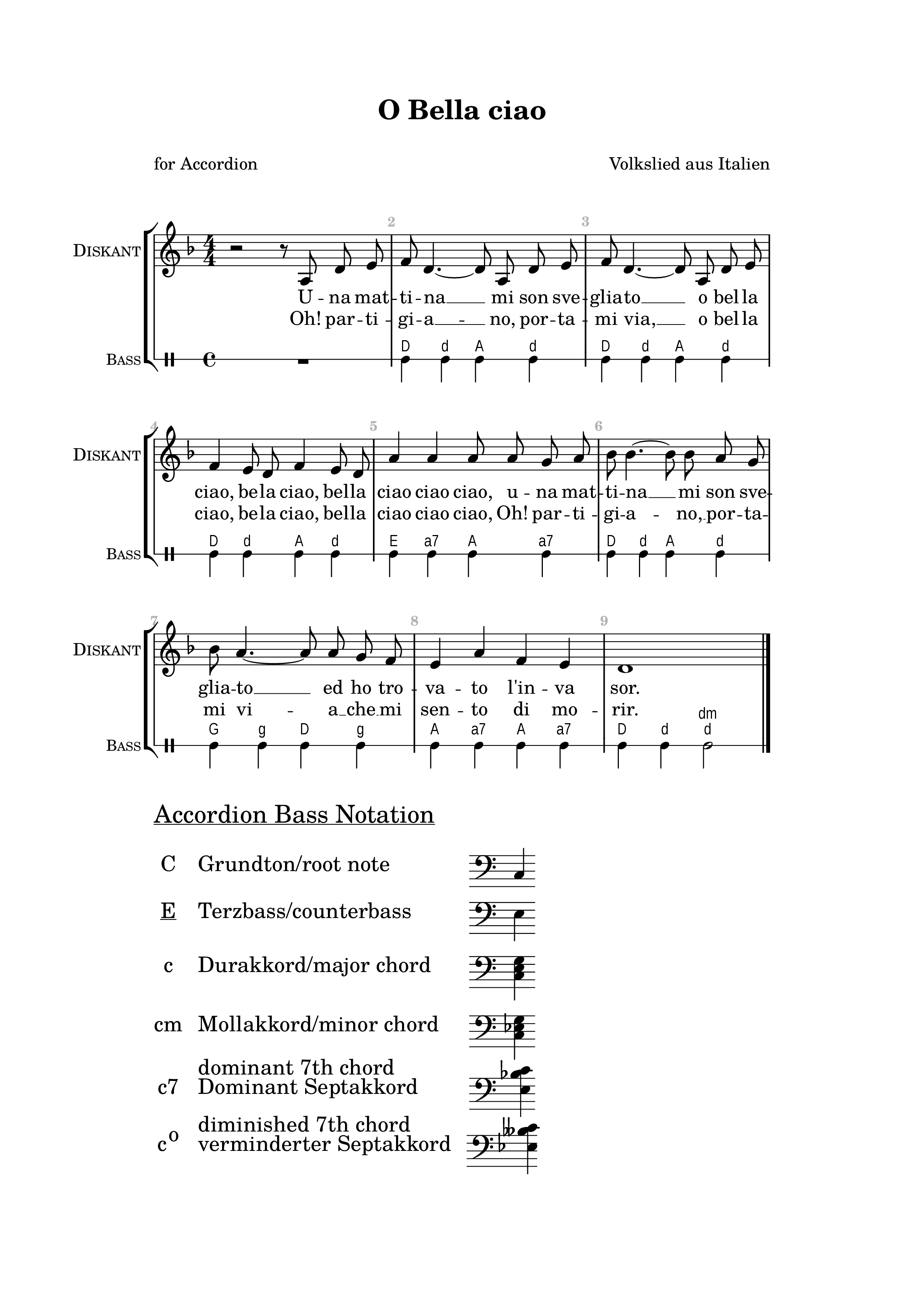

Song
- Language: Italian
- Published: 1953
- Genre: Folk

"Bella ciao" (Italian: [ˈbɛlla ˈtʃaːo]) is an anti-Nazi and anti-fascist Italian folk song dedicated to the partisans of the Italian resistance, who fought against the occupying troops of Nazi Germany and the collaborationist fascist forces during the liberation of Italy.

The exact origins are not known, but it is theorized to be based on a folk song of the late 19th century, sung by female workers (mondine) of the paddy fields in Northern Italy in protest against harsh working conditions. There is little evidence of the song being used during World War II, with the current partisan version becoming widespread only after it ended. Versions of "Bella ciao" continue to be sung worldwide as a hymn of resistance against Nazism, fascism, injustice and oppression.

== History ==
The origins of the song are unclear, although one hypothesis is that "Bella ciao" was originally sung as "Alla mattina appena alzata" ("In the morning as soon as I woke up") by seasonal workers of paddy fields of rice, especially in Italy's Po Valley from the late 19th century to the first half of the 20th century, with different lyrics. They worked at mondare (weeding) the rice fields in Northern Italy, to help the healthy growth of young rice plants. This work was performed during the flooding of the fields, from the end of April to the beginning of June every year. During this time, the first stages of the rice plants' development, the delicate shoots needed to be protected from the difference in temperature between the day and the night. It consisted of two phases: transplanting the plants and pruning the weeds.

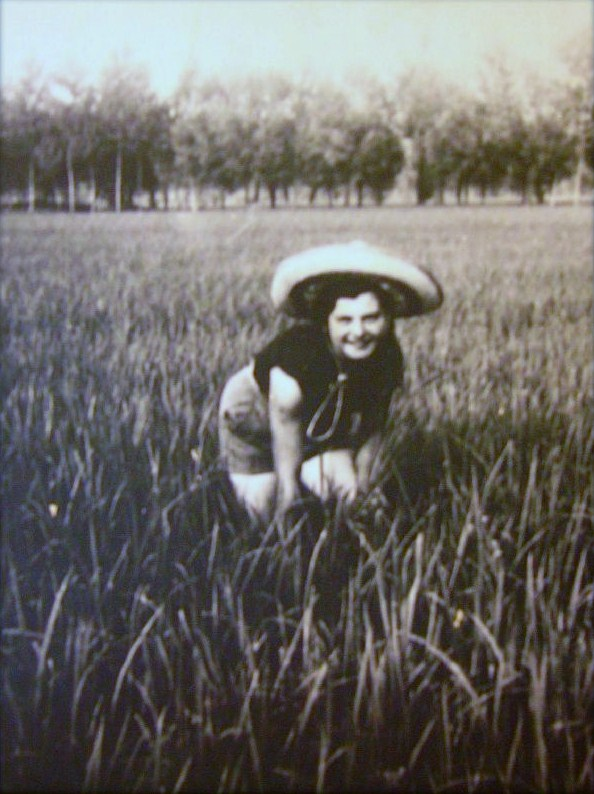
Photograph of a mondina working in a field

This exhausting task was carried out primarily by women known as mondine, recruited from the poorest social classes. They spent their workdays barefoot in water up to their knees, their backs bent continuously. Poor working conditions, excessive hours and low pay led to constant dissatisfaction and, occasionally, rebellious movements and riots in the early 20th century. Struggles against the supervising padroni (an employer who completely controls his or her workers, especially one who exploits Italian immigrants) were even harder, with plenty of clandestine workers ready to compromise even further the already low wages just to get work. Besides "Bella ciao", similar songs of the mondina included "Sciur padrun da li beli braghi bianchi" and "Se otto ore vi sembran poche".

Other versions of the antecedents of "Bella ciao" appeared over the years, indicating that "Alla mattina appena alzata" must have been composed in the latter half of the 19th century. The earliest written version is dated to 1906 and comes from near Vercelli, Piedmont.

=== As a partisan song ===
There are no indications of the relevance of "Bella ciao" among the partisan brigades, nor of the very existence of the 'partisan version' prior to the first publication of the text in 1953. There are no traces in the documents of the immediate postwar period nor is it present in important songbooks. It is not found, for example, in Pasolini's 1955 Canzoniere Italiano nor in the Canti Politici of Editori Riuniti of 1962. The 1963 version of Yves Montand shot to fame after the group Il Nuovo Canzoniere Italiano presented it at the 1964 Festival dei Due Mondi at Spoleto both as a song of the mondine and as a partisan hymn, and the latter so "inclusive" that it could hold together the various political souls of the national liberation struggle (Catholics, Communists, Socialists, Liberals...) and even be sung at the end of the Christian Democracy (Democrazia Cristiana) 1975 congress which elected the former partisan Zaccagnini as national secretary.

As reported in the text by Roberto Battaglia History of the Italian Resistance popular songs of the era were Fischia il vento and the famous Soviet folk aria Katyusha, which became the official anthem of the Garibaldi Partisan Brigades.

"Bella ciao" at U Fleků, Prague

Even the well-known journalist, former partisan and historian of the partisan struggle, Giorgio Bocca publicly stated:

"Bella ciao"... song of the Resistance, and "Giovinezza"... song of the Fascist period... Neither one nor the other born from partisans or fascists, one borrowed from a Dalmatian song, the other from the Tuscan student spirit and over the years it has become the official or de facto anthems of anti-fascist Italy and that of the Mussolini regime... In the twenty months of the partisan war I have never heard people sing "Bella ciao", an invention of the Spoleto Festival.

— Luigi Morrone, The true story of "Bella ciao," which was never sung in the Resistance, "Our Story," "Corriere della Sera," 10 July 2018.

These statements were later verified by Carlo Pestelli in his book Bella ciao. The song of freedom, in which he reconstructs the origins and spread of the song.

Historians of Italian music, including Antonio Virgilio Savona and Michele Straniero, agree "Bella ciao" was not sung or only rarely sung during the partisan war and became popular only after WW2 ended.

Only a few voices, such as that of the historians Cesare Bermani and Ruggero Giacomini, claim that some version of "Bella ciao" was sung by some brigades during the Resistance, although not necessarily in the now popular 'partisan version', of whose existence, as specified above, there is no documentary evidence until the 1950s.

The text as sung today was first published in 1953 in the magazine La Lapa, and then in L'Unità in 1957.

== Melody ==
Bella ciao
Instrumental version performed by Representative Orchestra of Serbian Guards (ROG)

Bella Ciao
Instrumental version by Peter Gerloff

A possible origin of the melody was identified by researcher Fausto Giovannardi, following the discovery of a Yiddish melody (Koilen song) recorded by a Russian Klezmer accordionist, Mishka Ziganoff, in 1919 in New York. According to the scholar Rod Hamilton of The British Library in London, "Koilen" is a version of "Dus Zekele Koilen" (The bag of coal), of which there are various versions dating back to the 1920s.

Italian folksinger Giovanna Daffini recorded the song in 1962. The music is in quadruple meter.

== Lyrics ==
=== Mondine version ===
Italian lyrics

Alla mattina appena alzata
o bella ciao bella ciao bella ciao, ciao, ciao
alla mattina appena alzata
in risaia mi tocca andar.

E fra gli insetti e le zanzare
o bella ciao bella ciao bella ciao ciao ciao
e fra gli insetti e le zanzare
un dur lavoro mi tocca far.

Il capo in piedi col suo bastone
o bella ciao bella ciao bella ciao ciao ciao
il capo in piedi col suo bastone
e noi curve a lavorar.

O mamma mia o che tormento
o bella ciao bella ciao bella ciao ciao ciao
o mamma mia o che tormento
io t'invoco ogni doman.

Ed ogni ora che qui passiamo
o bella ciao bella ciao bella ciao ciao ciao
ed ogni ora che qui passiamo
noi perdiam la gioventù.

Ma verrà un giorno che tutte quante
o bella ciao bella ciao bella ciao ciao ciao
ma verrà un giorno che tutte quante
lavoreremo in libertà.

English translation

In the morning I got up
oh bella ciao, bella ciao, bella ciao, ciao, ciao (Goodbye beautiful)
In the morning I got up
To the paddy fields I have to go.

And between insects and mosquitoes
oh bella ciao, bella ciao, bella ciao, ciao, ciao
and between insects and mosquitoes
a hard work I have to do.

The boss is standing with his cane
oh bella ciao, bella ciao, bella ciao, ciao, ciao
the boss is standing with his cane
and we work with our backs curved.

Oh my God, what a torment
oh bella ciao, bella ciao, bella ciao, ciao, ciao
oh my God, what a torment
as I call you every morning.

And every hour that we pass here
oh bella ciao, bella ciao, bella ciao, ciao, ciao
and every hour that we pass here
we lose our youth.

But the day will come when we all
oh bella ciao, bella ciao, bella ciao, ciao, ciao
but the day will come when we all
will work in freedom.

=== Partisan version ===
Italian lyrics (Note: In some versions, an additional part of the song is added, it has these lyrics: Ed era rossa la sua bandiera. O bella ciao, bella ciao, bella ciao ciao ciao, Era rossa, la sua bandiera la bandiera del lavor. Ed era rossa la sua bandiera, La bandiera del lavor! (en. And his flag was red Oh bella ciao, bella ciao, bella ciao ciao ciao, His flag, it was red. The flag of labor. And his flag was red. The flag of Labor!))

Una mattina mi son svegliato,
O bella ciao, bella ciao, bella ciao, ciao, ciao!
Una mattina mi son svegliato
E ho trovato l'invasor.

O partigiano portami via,
o bella ciao, bella ciao, bella ciao ciao ciao
o partigiano portami via
che mi sento di morir.

E se io muoio da partigiano,
o bella ciao, bella ciao, bella ciao ciao ciao,
e se io muoio da partigiano
tu mi devi seppellir.

E seppellire lassù in montagna,
o bella ciao, bella ciao, bella ciao ciao ciao,
e seppellire lassù in montagna
sotto l'ombra di un bel fior.

E le genti che passeranno
O bella ciao, bella ciao, bella ciao, ciao, ciao!
E le genti che passeranno
Ti diranno o che bel fior.

È questo il fiore del partigiano
O bella ciao, bella ciao, bella ciao, ciao, ciao!
È questo il fiore del partigiano
Morto per la libertà.

English translation

One morning I awakened,
oh bella ciao, bella ciao, bella ciao, ciao, ciao! (Goodbye beautiful)
One morning I awakened
And I found the invader.

Oh partisan carry me away,
oh bella ciao, bella ciao, bella ciao, ciao, ciao
oh partisan carry me away
Because I feel death approaching.

And if I die as a partisan,
oh bella ciao, bella ciao, bella ciao, ciao, ciao
and if I die as a partisan
then you must bury me.

Bury me up in the mountain,
oh bella ciao, bella ciao, bella ciao, ciao, ciao
bury me up in the mountain
under the shade of a beautiful flower.

And all those who shall pass,
oh bella ciao, bella ciao, bella ciao, ciao, ciao
and all those who shall pass
will tell you "what a beautiful flower."

This is the flower of the partisan,
oh bella ciao, bella ciao, bella ciao, ciao, ciao
this is the flower of the partisan
who died for freedom

== Covers ==
One of the most famous recordings is that of the Italian folk singer Giovanna Daffini who recorded both the mondina and the partisan versions. It appears in her 1975 album Amore mio non piangere. Many artists have recorded the song, including Herbert Pagani, Mary Hopkin, Sandie Shaw, Goran Bregovic and Manu Chao.

- 1964: Yves Montand as a single
- 1965: Milva as a single
- 1969: Quilapayún in the album Basta, later connected to criticism of the regime of Augusto Pinochet
- 1975: Giovanna Daffini in her album Amore mio non piangere
- 1987: Leslie Fish and the Dehorn Crew in the album It's Sister Jenny's Turn to Throw the Bomb
- 1993: KUD Idijoti on the album Tako je govorio Zaratusta
- 1993: Modena City Ramblers on the album Combat Folk
- 1993: Banda Bassotti on the mini-album Bella Ciao
- 2001: Anita Lane on the album Sex O'Clock
- 2004: Serbian punk rock band Goblini in their 2004 live album Najbolje priče
- 2010: Talco on the album Combat Circus
- 2012: Goran Bregovic on the album Champagne For Gypsies
- 2018: Marc Ribot and Tom Waits on the album Songs of Resistance 1942–2018 by Marc Ribot
- 2018: Steve Aoki and Marnik published another EDM version
- 2018: Klischée released an Electro Swing version as a single.
- 2019: Amparo Sánchez and Juan Pinilla released a Flamenca interpretation for the congress of the European Left
- 2021: Hopsin released a hip hop version sampling Bella Ciao on his "Be11a Ciao" album
- 2021: Helmut Lotti released "Italian Songbook" with Bella Ciao as track number 5
- 2021: Becky G as a single
- 2022: Two-time Grammy winner Ulises Bella, from the band Ozomatli, arranged a version for Italian-American singer Isabella Han-Bolelli.
- 2022: As a part of the Hearts of Iron IV's DLC By Blood Alone, Paradox Games released a choir version of "Bella Ciao" arranged by Håkan Glänte and performed by Göteborg Baroque.
- 2022: American Musician Seth Staton Watkins Released a culturally translated cover loosely based on a translation by Paddy Shannon on his YouTube Channel
- 2024: A guitar cover of the song, featuring English lyrics she translated using Google Translate, was posted by Mitski on her YouTube channel.

=== International versions ===
In addition to the original Italian, the song has been recorded by various artists in many different languages, including Albanian, Arabic, Armenian, Belarusian, Bosnian, Breton, Bengali, Bulgarian, Burmese, Catalan, Chinese, Croatian, Czech, Danish, English, Esperanto, Finnish, German, Greek, Hindi, Hungarian, Hebrew, Japanese, Kashmiri, Kurdish, Persian, Macedonian, Malayalam, Marathi, Norwegian, Occitan, Punjabi, Russian, Serbian, Sinhalese, Slovak, Spanish, Syriac, Swedish, Tagalog, Tamil, Telugu, Thai, Tibetan, Turkish, Ukrainian and Yiddish.

- Azerbaijani Soviet singer Muslim Magomayev performed the song at some of his concerts and he stated that it was Brezhnev's favorite by him.
- The Chinese version of the song featured in the Chinese translation of the Yugoslavian film The Bridge.
- A rewritten version of the song can be heard on Chumbawamba's acoustic album A Singsong and a Scrap.
- Guadeloupean punk band The Bolokos recorded a version in Creole and French called "Bel Aw" on their eponymous album inspired by the Ramoneurs de Menhirs version.
- Another version of the song was recorded by the punk rock band Dog Faced Hermans on their album, Every Day Time Bomb.
- Former Yugoslav punk rock bands KUD Idijoti and later Goblini recorded their versions of the track.
- Hungarian punk rock band Aurora has performed the song.
- Folk musician Leslie Fish has written and performed several versions of the song, one of which can be found on the album Smoked Fish.
- Folk artist Mirah lent her voice to this song on her 2004 album, To All We Stretch the Open Arm.
- Anita Lane recorded a version in English for her 2001 album, Sex O'Clock.
- Russian Band Balagan Limited 1997 - English: We're going to the city.
- Breton folk punk band Les Ramoneurs de menhirs recorded a version in Breton and French but called it "BellARB".
- Swedish progg group Knutna nävar included a version in Swedish named I Alla Länder on their album De svarta listornas folk from 1973.
- Danish psychedelic rock group The Savage Rose have recorded a version of this song on the albums En Vugge Af Stål from 1982 and Ild Og Frihed (1989).
- San Francisco punk band La Plebe perform "Bella Ciao" on their album, Brazo en Brazo.
- French-born musician of Spanish origin Manu Chao has also recorded a version of the song.
- Kurdish Singer Ciwan Haco has included the song in his album Çaw Bella 1989 – Bochum – Germany. He sang it in Kurmanji Kurdish He added the Kurmanji masculine vocative case article 'lo' to the lyrics to give it some locality.
- Kurdish music band Koma Dengê Azadî has also included the song with a different style in their album Çaw Bella 1991 – Istanbul – Turkey. The song was revived during ISIS attack on Kobane 2014.
- The tune has been used in the song "Pilla Chao" from the 2011 Telugu language film Businessman, composed by S. Thaman and also dubbed as "Penne Chaavu" in the Malayalam version of the same film.
- The 2013 Hindi language film Besharam starring Ranbir Kapoor uses the tune in the song "Love Ki Ghanti."
- Italian ska punk band Talco recorded the song on their 2006 album Combat Circus.
- The Norwegian group Samvirkelaget (a collaboration between rap group Gatas Parlament and ska band Hopalong Knut) released a version of the song on their 2007 album Musikk.
- German Liedermacher Hannes Wader recorded a German version on Wader, Hannes (1977). Hannes Wader singt Arbeiterlieder [sings workers' songs] (in German). Mercury.
- Konstantin Wecker and Hannes Wader performed it live on their collaboration album Was für eine Nacht.
- Turkish band Grup Yorum have recorded a Turkish translation of the song on their 1988 album Haziranda Ölmek Zor / Berivan.
- Turkish band Bandista has recorded a Turkish version, "Hoşçakal", on their album Daima!, in 2011.
- Bosnian musician Goran Bregović has recorded one version on his album Champagne for Gypsies (2012).
- German folk duo Zupfgeigenhansel recorded a free adaptation on their 1982 album Miteinander that, instead of glorifying the death of the partisan, paints him as a reluctant anti-hero who is scared and despises war, but feels he has no other choice because of the atrocities he has seen.
- Thai anti-fascist band Faiyen recorded a Thai version of the song called "Plodploy Plianplaeng" (Thai: ปลดปล่อย เปลี่ยนแปลง, "Liberate and Change"). It has been used by the Red Shirts anti-fascism group since 2011.
- Spanish punk rock band Boikot recorded a modified version in Spanish.
- An a cappella version was recorded by The Swingle Singers in 1991 on their album Folk Music Around The World.
- Belarusian folk punk band Dzieciuki recorded a modified version in Belarusian under the name "Трымайся, браце!" ("Hold fast, brother!").
- Patric recorded "Bèla Ciaò", a version in Occitan for his 2010 album, Colors.
- Mike Singer recorded an Electro dance version in June 2018.
- Jama Musse Jama translated the song into Somali and recorded a Somali version with the singer Abdinasir Macallin Eydeed and hist band for 2015 Hargeysa International Book Fair.
- In August 2018, Škampi na Žaru, an occasional musical project of Slovak Radio Expres, published the song with Slovak lyrics.
- In November 2018, Slovak Gypsy musical project Kuky band released a version of the song on YouTube with lyrics about the life of a Gypsy musician, becoming an internet sensation and popular meme in both Czechia and Slovakia, due to the humorous nature of the low quality greenscreen VFX used in the music video, reaching over 1,5 million views as of September 2025. The band's other music videos also contributed to their rise in popularity, both due to internet virality and the band's musical talent, taking them from uploading homemade YouTube videoclips and playing small, local concerts, to getting played on radios and even becoming popular abroad.
- Hardwell and Maddix released an EDM version of the song in 2018.
- American DJ Steve Aoki and Marnik also made an EDM version in 2018.
- Marc Ribot collaborated with Tom Waits to create their own version for 2018. It is the first song Tom Waits has done in 2 years. This appears on the Marc Ribot album Songs of Resistance 1942–2018.
- In 2019, The Swedish Social Democratic Party released a version featuring several party officials recorded in Benny Andersson's studio.
- In 2019, Extinction Rebellion modified the text to suit their mission and named their new version "Rebella Ciao".
- In 2019, Spanish singer Najwa released her take on the Spanish version of the song, that later served as the music in the ending credits of the fourth season of Money Heist (in which she plays Alicia Sierra).
- On 23 February 2020 Kashmiri version of the song was released by Zanaan Wanaan, an independent feminist collective based in Kashmir, to protest against the Indian government in the region of Kashmir.
- In September 2019, Lebanese singer Shiraz released her remixed version of the song that topped the Lebanese Singles Chart.
- In October 2019, in CAA and NRC protests Poojan Sahil, made a Hindi version "Wapas Jao" (transl. Go Back) of Bella Ciao in Hindi.
- On 6 January 2020, a Hindi version of this song was used by protesters in Mumbai who were agitating against the Indian government (Citizenship Amendment Act protests).
- 2018: DJ Ötzi covered the song with German lyrics.
- In the 2020 Slim by-election, Barisan Nasional specifically Pergerakan Pemuda UMNO supporters adopted the song's melody, modified it in Malay under the name "Cukuplah Sekali Ditipu" ("It's enough to be cheated once") referring to the former Pakatan Harapan administration from 2018 to 2020. The song, with rendition, later regained popularity among BN supporters in the 2022 Malaysian General Elections, which was uploaded on the official YouTube channel of UMNO.
- In February 2020, a Bengali translation of the song by Sharif Siraj was sung by Jojon Mahmud.
- On 17 December 2020, during the 2020–2021 Indian farmers' protest, Poojan Sahil made a rendition of "Bella Ciao" in Punjabi against the new farm laws in India.
- During the 2020 COVID-19 pandemic, a Bengali version of the song was created named "Lorey Jao" (trans : Continue to fight) to encourage the frontline workers in India.
- In 2020, Indian rapper Epr Iyer released a song named "Yeh Bata (Bella Ciao)"
- In 2020, protest group Men In Black Denmark used the song's melody, renaming it "Mette Ciao", referring to Danish Prime Minister Mette Frederiksen.
- During the coronavirus pandemic in 2020 and inspired by the TV series La Casa de Papel, six Armenian pop stars – Nick Egibyan, Sofi Mkheyan, Hayko, Erik Karapetyan, Emmy, Nerses Avetisyan – came together to release the Armenian version of the song, with original lyrics by Aram Topchyan.
- The song was featured in Far Cry 6 as, "La Bella Ciao de Libertad." It is sung in Spanish by the main protagonist and side character during a mission as they burn a tobacco farm.
- Zin Linn, a Burmese student activist, wrote the Burmese version of the song and it was sung in several demonstrations in Myanmar, during the nationwide protest against the military coup in early 2021.
- In 2021, a Bengali version of "Bella Ciao" was used by an Indian political party, BJP, to campaign against another party named TMC. The song was named "Pishi jao", which means "Aunty go!" in Bengali referring to TMC leader Mamata Banerjee. This led to widespread derision and a lot of unintended humor as many observers pointed out the obvious irony of a far-right party needing to resort to using a historically left-wing slogan for their campaign.
- In July 2022, Sri Lankan actress Samanalee Fonseka and Sri Lankan singer Indrachapa Liyanage together with the National People's Power released a Sinhalese cover "Enawado (එනවාදෝ)" ("Will you come?") during the 2022 Sri Lankan protests.
- In 2023, the Serbian version of "Bella Ciao", part of "Next to you" movie soundtrack, interpreted by Bojana Janković, was used as anthem of 2023 Serbian protests.
- In 2022, Celtic F.C. fans created a chant based on the song. Other clubs later followed in creating their own versions.
- In 2026, it was used on the soundtrack of the Hindi Netflix production Taskaree: The Smuggers Web.

== In popular culture ==
As an internationally known hymn of freedom, it was intoned at many historic and revolutionary events. The song originally aligned itself with Italian partisans fighting against Nazi German occupation troops, but has since come to merely stand for the inherent rights of all people to be liberated from tyranny.

=== Renewed popularity ===
In 2017 and 2018, the song received renewed popularity due to the singing of "Bella ciao" multiple times in the Spanish television series Money Heist. The character Tokyo recounts in one of her narrations, "The life of the Professor revolved around a single idea: Resistance. His grandfather, who had fought against the fascists in Italy, taught him the song and he taught us." The song is played in emblematic moments in the series as a metaphor for freedom.

In the German protests against the rising right-extremist party AfD in January 2025, the song was chanted by around 600 people in Würzburg. The event produced a viral TikTok video with 3.4 million views within 4 days, documenting the chants during the protest.

Chart positions (2018)
Date	Title	Performer(s)	Charts							
Date	Title	Performer(s)	FRA	AUT	BEL (Fl)	BEL (Wa)	GER	NLD	POL	SWI
14 April 2018	Bella Ciao (La Casa de Papel Remix)	Meder	—	—	—	—	—	—	—	—
14 April 2018	Bella Ciao	Bella Ciao	119	—	—	—	—	—	—	—
14 April 2018	Bella Ciao	The Bear	45	—	—	—	—	—	—	—
14 April 2018	Bella Ciao (1995 version)	Thomas Fersen	153	—	—	—	—	—	—	—
14 April 2018	Bella Ciao	Red Army Choir (Les Chœurs de l'Armée rouge)	147	—	—	—	—	—	—	—
21 April 2018	Bella Ciao	Sound of Legend	29	—	—	—	—	—	—	—
21 April 2018	Bella Ciao (Hugel Remix)	El Profesor	11	1	13	4 (Ultratip)	2	—	27	14
28 April 2018	Bella Ciao	Ska J	159	—	—	—	—	—	—	—
5 May 2018	Bella Ciao	Manu Pilas	27	—	—	—	—	—	—	—
12 May 2018	Bella Ciao	Rémy	66	—	—	Tip	—	—	—	—
12 May 2018	Bella Ciao	El Profesor & Berlin	4	35	—	21 (Ultratip)	—	—	—	—
19 May 2018	Bella Ciao	Naestro, Maître Gims, Vitaa, Dadju, Slimane	1	—	—	13	—	—	—	57
25 May 2018	Bella Ciao	Young Ellens	—	—	—	—	—	27	—	—
29 June 2018	Bella Ciao	Mike Singer	—	59	—	—	44	—	—	80

Video of Italian Catholic priest Andrea Gallo singing the song during mass with the congregation was recorded in 2012. In 2016, Jacobin magazine uploaded the video to social media, receiving hundreds of thousands of views, and occasionally re-uploads the Don Gallo rendition.

In April 2018, supporters from the Portuguese football club F.C. Porto adapted the song with the lyrics "Penta Xau" ("Bye bye fifth"), as a taunt referring to the lost opportunity by rival club S.L. Benfica to win a fifth consecutive national championship, a feat realized in Portugal by F.C. Porto.

The song was the basis of a taunt by Brazilian fans used during World Cup 2018 exemplifying the Argentina–Brazil football rivalry, and the unrealized elimination during the first round in another attempt by Argentina at a 5th Cup title cut short if they were eliminated. The lyrics made references to Argentine players Di María, Mascherano, and Messi.

The song was the inspiration for the #EleNão movement against right wing Brazilian presidential candidate Jair Bolsonaro.

During nationwide protests in Colombia in 2019, the anti-fascist song was adapted by demonstrators to oppose the government of Iván Duque of the Centro Democrático party, who have been for years questioned or investigated for systematic violations of the Constitution, the environment, Human Rights and Crimes against humanity. As the presidential period of Duque ends in 2022, since 2019 the song, dubbed as 'Duque Chao', is sung and interpreted in protests in Colombia and by the diáspora, also during the national strike demonstrations of April and May 2021, in which citizens have been killed, injured and disappeared by state police forces.

In March 2020, the song once again gained international attention after Europeans and Italians in lockdown due to the COVID-19 pandemic in Italy and Europe sang "Bella ciao" from the balconies of their housing complexes.

In 2023, unionists from the Italian General Confederation of Labour, Italian Confederation of Trade Unions, and Italian Labour Union sang "Bella Ciao" to protest Prime Minister Giorgia Meloni, who has been criticized for her party's neo-fascist origins. Similarly, in 2024, left-wing MEPs sang "Bella Ciao" in the European Parliament on the occasion of a visit by Hungary's authoritarian prime minister Viktor Orbán.

In September 2025, Utah Governor Spencer Cox announced that a bullet casing from a rifle found during the investigation of the assassination of Charlie Kirk was engraved with "Oh bella ciao bella ciao bella ciao ciao ciao".

=== Filmography ===
"Bella Ciao" has been used many times in soundtracks of films. Examples include:

- 1969: "Most (Savage Bridge)", directed by Hajrudin Krvavac, Yugoslavia.
- 1976: 3000 Leagues in Search of Mother directed by Isao Takahata, Japan.
- 2000: À l'attaque! directed by Robert Guédiguian.
- 2006: No Mercy for the Rude is a South Korean neo-noir action comedy film directed by Park Chul-hee.
- 2010: L'Immortel directed by Richard Berry, where "Bella Ciao" is sung by a prisoner.
- 2012: Businessman directed by Puri Jagannadh, where "Pilla Chao" is sung by Vijay Surya. Music director: S Thaman
- 2013: "Besharam" directed by Abhinav Kashyap, where "Love Ki Ghanti" is sung by Sujeet Shetty, Ranbir Kapoor, & Amitosh Nagpal.
- 2017: Money Heist, Spanish TV series, sung many times by the robbers.
- 2018: Bella Ciao!, a feature film. Whistled on soundtrack during the beginning title and performed by The Carnival Band in a scene.
- 2019: The Two Popes, a biographical film directed by Fernando Meirelles.
- 2020: There Is No Evil, Iranian drama film directed by Mohammad Rasoulof.
- 2022: R.M.N., Romanian drama film written and directed by Cristian Mungiu, where the villagers sing and dance to the song, ironic given the turn the village takes later.
- 2023: Next to you, Serbian film directed by Stevan Filipović.

== See also ==
- Bandiera Rossa – another Italian revolutionary song
- Fischia il vento – another song associated with the Italian partisans
- Siamo i ribelli della montagna – another Italian partisan song
- Zog nit keyn mol – A Yiddish partisan song popularized during WW2
- Stornelli Legionari – The pro-fascist 'equivalent'
- List of socialist songs
