= Moni Ovadia =

Italian artist and activist (born 1946)

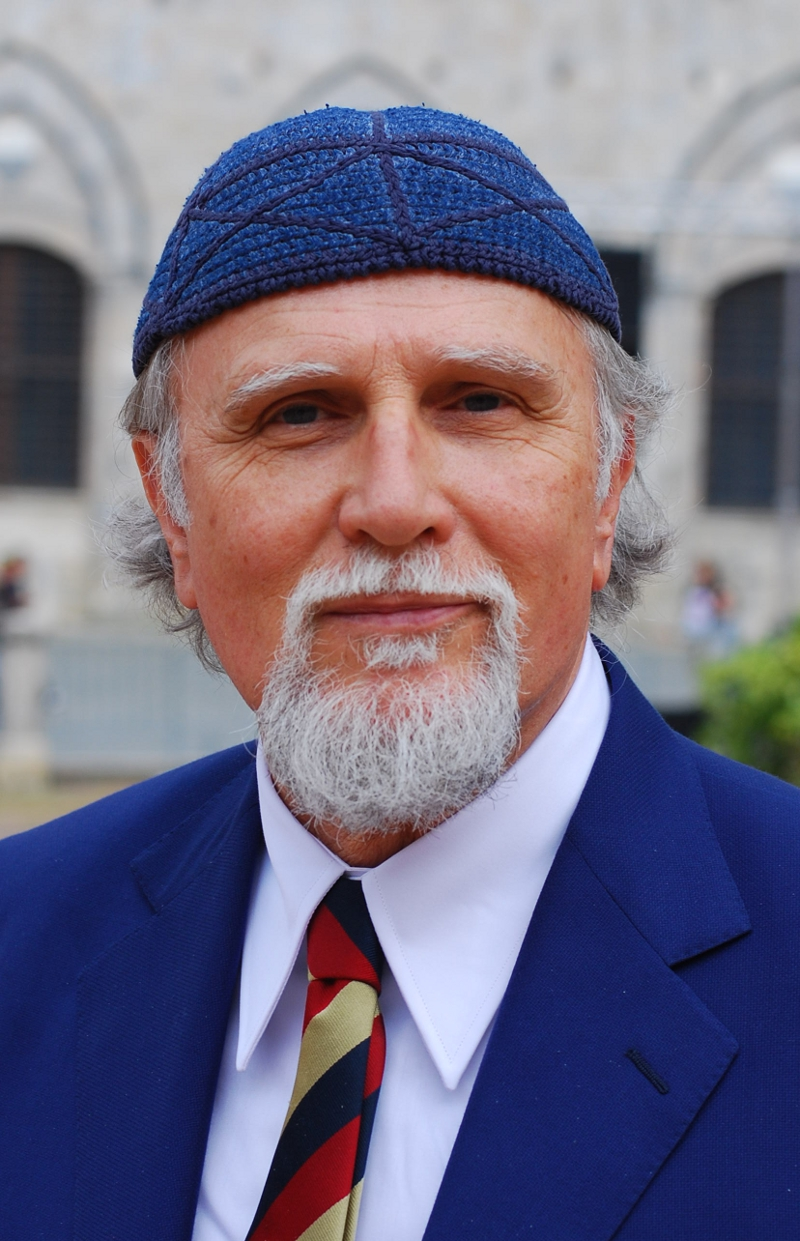
- Ovadia in 2010
- Born: Solomon Ovadia; 16 April 1946 (age 80); Plovdiv, Tsardom of Bulgaria
- Occupations: Actor, musician, singer, theatrical author
- Height: 1.74 m (5 ft 9 in)
- Spouse: Elisa Savi (m. 1997)

Salomone Moni Ovadia (born 16 April 1946) is a Bulgarian-born Italian Jewish actor, musician, singer, theatrical author, and activist. His theatrical performances reference Eastern European Jewish culture and historical Yiddish culture.

== Early life and family ==
Solomon Ovadia was born on 16 April 1946 in Plovdiv, Bulgaria, to a Sephardic Jewish family. His father, a violinist, had Greek and Turkish roots, while the family of his mother, a singer, was of Serb origin. In March 1943, the 1,500 Jews of Plovdiv, including Ovadia's family, were saved from the Holocaust in Bulgaria by the actions of Metropolitan of Plovdiv, Cyril, one of the heads of the Bulgarian Orthodox Church who threatened to throw himself before the train were it to depart with the community's Jews, whom the Nazis planned to deport to a concentration camp. (Note: "the deportation of the 1,500 Jews of the Bulgarian city of Plovdiv began, local Bishop Metropolitan Kiril succeeded in halting it. Kiril sent a personal telegram to the King begging for his mercy towards the Jews, and contacted the head of the local police, threatening to end his loyalty towards to Bulgaria and to act as he wished. Further testimony claims that he threatened to lie across the railway tracks in order to stop the deportation. When told that his actions had proved successful, and that this deportation order had been cancelled he rushed to the Jewish school – which the authorities had turned into a roundup point for the Jews – and told them the good news." (Yad Vashem 2002)) His family's sense of Judaism was restricted to observing key feastdays. They shifted to Italy in 1949 to flee a rise in antisemitism in post-war Bulgaria, which had otherwise protected its Jews.

== Move to Italy ==
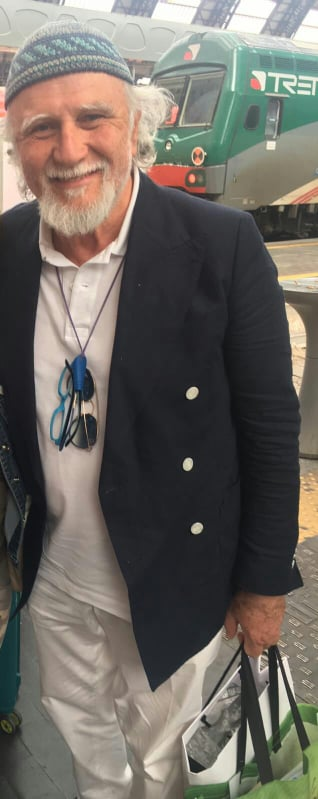
Ovadia in 2019

Ovadia speaks Italian with a Milanese accent. In Milan, he attended its Jewish school. There he was taught to sing Yiddish songs, but only began to learn the language much later, from a Chabad rabbi, after an acquaintance, Rudi Litwak, insisted that, instead of frequenting Milan's Central Synagogue, with its Italian rites, they visit a small synagogue, Beit Shlomo, at Porta Romana, an apartment used as a shul or shtibi where the language was being spoken passionately by elderly Holocaust survivors and that rabbi. (Note: "An important turning point came when 'during prayer service at the big temple of Milan, someone pestered me and hounded me until I followed him to an apartment where two hundred 'Yiddishkeit' Jews were sitting. I discovered the Yiddish theatre right here, in Milan. They spoke Yiddish, laughed in Yiddish and argued in Yiddish the whole time.'" (Zaikowsky 2003))

A formative influence in this period, particularly for his interest in Jewish culture, was the mathematician and psychoanalyst Haim Baharier, who had studied under Emmanuel Levinas, (Note: Both Baharier and Levinas came under the sway of the charismatic vagabond Monsieur Chouchani, a polymath with a reputed total command also of the Bible, the Talmud and the entire literature of commentary succeeding it, as well as the Qur'an (Costantino 2014)) and who opened up for him the riches of Yiddish culture. (Note: They later drifted away from each other, despite the latter's extreme refinement in rabbinical studies:"a painful separation bound up with the contradictions many Jews lodge within themselves. When he speaks of Talmudic hermeneutics, his thinking is as consummately refined, daredevilish, head-spinning as anything one might imagine, while when he speaks of the state of Israel and the Palestinian question, it sinks to the level of mediocre agit-prop." (una separazione dolorosa legata alle contraddizioni molti ebrei albergano in sé. Quando lui parla di ermeneutica talmudica, il suo pensiero è quanto di più raffinato, spericolato, vertiginoso si possa immaginare, mentre quando parla dello Stato di Israele e della questione palestinese, scade al livello di un mediocre agit-prop.) (Ovadia & Pepino 2021)) Ovadia graduated in political science and made his debut in the theatre world under Roberto Leydi as singer and musician in the band Almanacco Popolare.

== Artistic career ==
In 1972, Ovadia founded a company, the Gruppo Folk Internazionale, dedicated initially to the study and playing of traditional Italian music, a focus which quickly expanded to embrace traditions of songs and music in the Balkans. He renamed it the Ensemble Havadià in 1978, a name drawn from his remote family origins. In 1984, Ovadia made his debut as a theatrical actor. In 1986, he produced Dalla sabbia dal tempo ("From sand, from time"), staged in collaboration with his friend from his Jewish lyceum days, Mara Cantoni, with an accompanying orchestra that also plays a role in the spectacle. Here Ovadia adopts his future format, of recitations interleaved by Yiddish songs and music. The unnamed protagonist (Shlomo in the script) is a Bundist émigré from an eastern shtetl in the process of assimilation. The period may be the 30s, and the ambiance either that of Vienna or Paris.

The Polish director Tadeusz Kantor, whom he met in 1983, became an important influence on his work. Throughout the 90s, Ovadia's performances drew rave reviews in Italy, and played a seminal role in the rise of a vogue for Jewish culture in that country. In 1990, he created the Theatre Orchestra, which became a stable component of his theatre, a backing of some 11 musicians. The innovation was perhaps influenced by Max Reinhardt's Gesamtkunstwerk and aspects of pre-war Yiddish theatre.

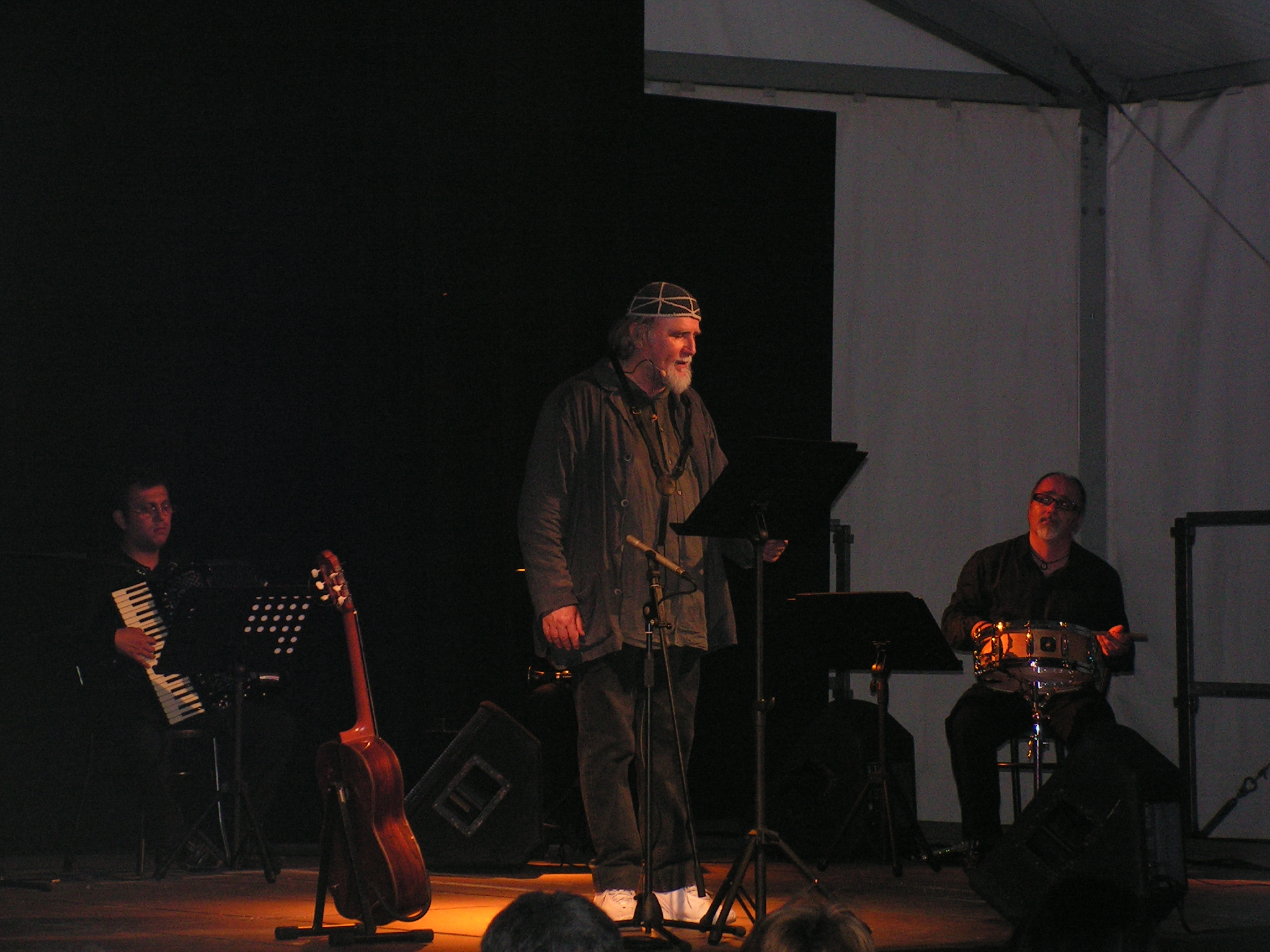
Ovadia during one of his shows

Around 1990 and 1991, Ovadia developed the idea of Golem, a cypher for Jewish diasporic identity, which crystallised in 1992 with his production of Oylem Goylem, (Note: Ovadia recalls that when his cabaret version was attended by the wife of the Chabad rabbi of Milan she rang later and said: "I won't change an iota of this show...This isn't an orthodox play, not at all, but it helped people working with our school better understand us. In just two hours, this show accomplished what we have not been able to accomplish in two months: to clarify who we are, where we came from, why and how." (Zaikowsky 2003)) Based on H. Leivick's Yiddish play The Golem, Ovadia's version (Oylem Goylem is Yiddish for "The world is dumb") skillfully melded satire and klezmer music sung by himself and deploys a range of accents: the Italian parts being recited by a Polish actor while Ovadia himself, when speaking Italian, pronounced it with a species of szmonces, a comic Yiddish accent used by Jewish actors in the interwar years when speaking Polish in cabaret performances. Ovadia and his team then toured Italy, France, Germany and the United States with the play, and the spectacle was broadcast by RAI, Italy's public broadcaster, in 2005. In 1995, Ovadia wrote Dybbuk, which addresses the Holocaust. His treatment drew inspiration from both S. An-sky's Yiddish drama Der Dibbuk and the Yiddish poet (murdered at Auschwitz) Itzhak Katzenelson's Song of the Murdered Jewish People. (Note: dos lid fun oysgehargeten yidishen folk (Mincer 2000, pp. 149–150).)

Dybbuk has come to be regarded as one of the most important Italian theatrical shows of the period. In the same year, he produced Taibele e il suo demone and Diario ironico dall'esilio, written with Roberto Andò. His following spectacles include Ballata di fine millennio (1996), Pallida madre, tenera sorella (1996), Il caso Kafka ("The Kafka File", 1997, with Andò), Trieste, ebrei e dintorni (1998), Mame, mamele, mamma, mamà... (1998), Joss Rakover si rivolge a Dio (1999), il banchiere errante (2001), L'armata a cavallo (2003). In The Kafka File, he plays the role of Yitzchak Lowy, whose Yiddish theatre fascinated the Czech writer. The premier of his Trieste piece, which took place on the eve of the Jewish holiday, Simchat Torah, was full of topical allusion to the Jewish experience of that city, which Ovadia noted drew on the work of his friend Claudio Magris, combined readings of the Torah with Jewish jokes and songs. In the finale, the lights are doused, to symbolize the erasure of that rich culture, which exists only in imaginative reconstructions like his own.

In 2005, Ovadia collaborated with the band Modena City Ramblers for their album Appunti partigiani. In 2007, a poll revealed that he was regarded as one of the six most popular cultural figures in Italy. In 2009, he appeared in the movie Mi Ricordo Anna Frank (Memories of Anne Frank). In 2010, together with artists from nomadic cultures such as the Roma and Sinti, he performed a theatrical piece entitled Rom & Gagè after France took measures to expel its gypsy population. A long time advocate of the cultural rights of persons with disabilities, Ovadia held for the first time a full representation in Italian Sign Language of "Il registro dei peccati", one of his most famous monologues, on 20 June 2013. The project was commissioned by and held at SoundMakers Festival, the only Italian multidisciplinary art festival fully accessible to persons with sensory disabilities. In 2016, in an event that was broadcast by RAI to an audience of millions, Ovadia was chosen to deliver one of the eulogies at Sforza Castle on the occasion of the funeral of Umberto Eco, Italy's most prominent post-war public intellectual and writer. He chose to honour his friend by recounting one of the numerous Yiddish jokes he had heard from Eco's vast repertoire.

== Views ==
=== Social philosophy ===
Ovadia says of himself that he is "proudly extremist", qualifying this by stressing his opposition to any form of violence. (Note: Highly critical of the United States whose policies since 2001, in his view, effectively fomented wars in the Middle East and are thereby responsible for the terrorism of Salafi, Wahhabite and Isis groups, Ovadia states: "All contemporary wars are criminal, as Gino Strada so eloquently maintained. That is because 90–95% of the victims are innocent civilians." (Tutte le guerre di oggi sono criminali come diceva straordinariamente bene Gino Strada. Perché il 90-95% delle vittime sono i civili innocenti.) (De Giovannangeli 2021)) He has been an outspoken opponent of racism, also within Italian society, which he says has absolved itself of any sense of guilt for its massacres in Ethiopia, Cyrenaica, and former Yugoslavia. He received an award from the University of Pavia in October 2007; in his acceptance speech he denounced the treatment of immigrants, especially Roma and Sinti. Ovadia states that his deep affinity for these people reflects his own sense of what being a Jew entails:

In western civilization, no one has been regarded as "the other", "the foreigner", the minority existing outside of its proper place, more than the Rom, the Sinti and the Jews. Yet while, in the wake of the great catastrophe, the Jews have taken their place in the winners' salon, of those everything about whom is to be duly acknowledged, this has not been done for the Rom and Sinti. Everybody recognizes the word Shoah, no one Porrajmos, which means the devouring: their extermination has yet to be acknowledged in the Europe that produced it. (Note: "Nella civiltà occidentale nessuno è stato considerato 'l'altro' e 'lo straniero', la minoranza fuori posto, più di rom, i sinti e gli ebrei. Però gli ebrei, dopo la grande catastrofe, sono entrati nel salotto dei vincitori, di coloro ai quali va riconosciuto tutto. I rom e i sinti no. Tutti conoscono parola 'Shoah' nessuno 'Porrajmos', il divoramento: il loro serminio non ha ancora avuto un riconoscimento nell'Europa che lo ha prodotto." (Calvini 2010))

=== Relationship with Judaism ===
Ovadia identifies as Jewish and agnostic. His characteristic woolen headdress is not a kippah, (Note: As has been suggested by Ruth Gruber, it was knitted for him by his wife, a fashion designer.) but rather bears close similarities to those worn by Moroccans, a likeness which has often led to Arabs in the street greeting him as "one of them". He says that it is something of the comfort factor of Linus's blanket.

In response to the possible impression his comic performances of a constructed shtetl "Jew" might feed into antisemitic stereotypes, such as that of a putative Jewish greed and Jewish noses, (Note: Rüthers' impression, drawing also on Gruber, is that he drops Yiddish witticisms with at times anti-Semitic punchlines before enthusiastic audiences (Rüthers 2010, p. 88).) Ovadia has remarked: "The merit of my success is that I simultaneously satisfy vast categories of people: Jews who love to laugh at themselves, those who feel a sense of guilt for that which happened and finally can laugh at Jews along with a Jew; anti-Semites who see their stereotypes confirmed." In a learned article penned for the Corriere della Sera in defence of Roberto Benigni's Life Is Beautiful, which was panned in some quarters as fabricating a version of the Holocaust and distorting its horror by introducing humour into its narrative of the tragedy, Ovadia documented the importance of the comical in Judaism and Jewish civilization generally. In appreciation of Benigni's work, he called him "a Jew honoris causa".

=== Views on Israel-Palestine conflict ===
Although he previously labeled himself as a "non-Zionist", Ovadia has progressively moved on to identifying as an anti-Zionist. The writer first visited Israel in 1966, and when asked of his feelings about the country, he replied:

Let's start by saying that I prefer 'Land of Holiness' or 'Land of the Holy One' to 'Holy Land'. It's a land whose (proper) destination is that of constructing holiness. In the Bible indeed the Blessed Holy One states: 'You shall be holy because I am holy'. To build holiness means therefore to pursue the imitatio Dei (imitation of God), while avoiding falling for the Luciferean temptation of substitutio Dei (Taking God's place); ...The land in itself therefore is not holy. (Note: "Cominciamo con il dire che io preferisco a 'Terra Santa' 'Terra di santità' o 'Terra del Santo'. È una terra la cui destinazione è di costruire santità. Il Santo Benedetto dice infatti nella Bibbia: Sarete santi perché io sono santo. Costruire santità significa allora perseguire l'imitatio Dei, evitando di cadere nella luciferina tentazione della substitutio Dei; ...La terra dunque di per sé non è santa) (Caffulli & Giorgi 2016, p. 1))

During the following years, Ovadia has become more and more critical of Israel, and of the double standards used by the United States in sanctioning human rights violations elsewhere, but never against Israel. (Note: "After what happened to Navalny, Russia was hit with sanctions. On the other hand, the approach of Israeli policies against Palestinians – which are illegal, oppressive, colonial and sadistic with regard to a defenceless people – are justified with a string of buts/howevers. I'm sick and tired of this stuff." (Dopo il caso Navalny, la Russia ha subito le sanzioni. Invece la politica degli israeliani nei confronti dei palestinesi – che è illegale, oppressiva, colonialista, sadica nei confronti di un popolo indifeso – si giustifica con una serie di però. Io sono stufo di questa roba.) (De Giovannangeli 2021)) In 2013, Ovadia broke with the Milan Jewish Community, which he joined out of respect for his parents, after complaining that it had become a "propaganda office for Israel", and in protest at what he called attempts to "Israelize" Judaism. (Note: Ovadia's withdrawal, more directly related to protests about the policies of Binyamin Netanyahu, occurred 10 months after a similar step was taken by Gad Lerner in protest against the Milan community's failure to take a clear stance when former PM Silvio Berlusconi at a Holocaust ceremony dropped some remarks praising Mussolini (Forward 2013).)

After the outbreak of the Gaza war in October 2023, the writer repeatedly accused Israel of genocide and ethnocide against the Palestinian people and criticized the press for the improper use of the term antisemitism, which according to Ovadia has been instrumentalized to silence critics of Israeli policies, adding that within Israel there is widespread "the worst idolatry ever". During an intervention in Turin on 27 January 2025, he doubled down by asserting that, considering the situation in the Middle East, "the Remembrance Day has failed".

== Reception and recognition ==
Ovadia has had a notable influence on the Neapolitan writer Erri De Luca. In 2005, he received the prize "Archivio Disarmo – Golden Doves for Peace" from IRIAD. The American writer Ruth Gruber, while noting the seminal role Ovadia's work has played in promoting (especially Eastern European) Jewish culture, adds a reservation:

Ovadia's performances, the image he projects and his immense influence in Italy illustrate another trap: the risk that Jews themselves can create or buy into or perpetuate Jewish worlds that are just as "virtual" or "absolutely fake" as those created by non-Jews. The world presented by Ovadia, Italy's most visible Jewish cultural figure, had little to do with either the physical image or popular culture of Italy's largely assimilated Jews themselves.

Gruber also notes the apparent contradiction of an Italian Jew using Yiddish, a language never adopted among Jewish communities there, as a vehicle for celebrating the Jewish tradition generally. Although despised by intellectuals of the Haskalah, who used it satirically in plays to mock the "backwardness" of their traditional communities, Yiddish nonetheless became in turn, also through theatre, a "civilizing agency par excellence" for the Jewish masses under the stress of modernity. (Note: "Beginning in Berlin in the latter half of the 18th century, the Haskalah (Jewish Enlightenment movement) stigmatized Yiddish speech as inimical to realizing the modern, Westernized Jew, which was this movement's project. Yiddish became an object of performative parody and satire, among both maskilim (Jewish advocates of the Haskalah) and non-Jewish Germans. The former wrote scathing satirical plays in Yiddish-which they often derisively referred to as zhargon (jargon)-using the language as a weapon of attack upon itself and its speakers; among the latter, Yiddish-inflected German speech (known as mauscheln) became a stock feature of comic performances mocking the integrationist efforts of German Jewish parvenus. The modern Yiddish theatre, which began in Romania in the 1870s, quickly emerged as an epitome of secularization and modernity-a 'civilizing agency par excellence' -for Yiddish-speaking masses in Eastern Europe and in immigrant centers, especially New York." (Shandler 2004, pp. 22–23))

== Books ==
- 1996 – Perché no?: L'ebreo corrosivo (it:La nave di Teseo),
- 1998 – Oylem Goylem, Mondadori, ISBN 978-8-804-45248-5
- 1998 – L'ebreo che ride, Giulio Einaudi, ISBN 978-8-858-41437-8
- 1998 – Speriamo che tenga – Viaggio di un saltimbanco sospeso tra cielo e terra, Mondadori, ISBN 88-04-45623-X (a hilarious autobiography)
- 1999 – La Porta di Sion. Trieste, Ebrei e dintorni, Libreria editrice goriziana, ISBN 978-8-886-92823-6
- 2000 – Ballata di fine millennio (book and CD), Einaudi, ISBN 978-88-06-15210-9
- 2002 – Vai a te stesso, Einaudi, ISBN 978-88-06-19438-3
- 2005 – Contro l'idolatria, Einaudi, ISBN 978-88-06-17644-0
- 2007 – Lavoratori di tutto il mondo, ridete (a humoristic revolution of communism), Einaudi, ISBN 978-88-06-18535-0
- 2010 – Il conto dell'Ultima cena (in collaboration with Gianni Di Santo), Einaudi, ISBN 978-88-06-20035-0
- 2010 – Introduction to the Italian edition of Yehudi Menuhin's book Musica e Vita Interiore
- 2013 - La meravigliosa vita di Jovica Jovic (in collaboration with Marco Rovelli), Feltrinelli, ISBN 978-88-07-17248-9

== Discography ==
- 1991 – Oylem Goylem (Fonit Cetra)
- 1995 – Dybbuk (Sensible Records)
- 2004 – Sulla memoria, with Yesh Gvul of Marco Fusi (CNI Audiocoop)
- 2011 – Oltre i confini – ebrei e zingari, with Moni Ovadia Stage Orchestra, (Promo Music Records/Edel)
- 2013 – Benvenuti nel ghetto, with Stormy Six (BTF)

== Bibliography ==
- Alvaro, Lorenzo (2 October 2014). "Ovadia: Plodviv è il cuore pulsante dell'Europa della convivenza" [Ovadia: Plodviv is the beating heart of the Europe of coexistence]. Vita (in Italian).
- Bellaspiga, Lucia (8 November 2019). "Caso Segre. Moni Ovadia: espellere gli odiatori o torneremo ai tempi bui" [Segre case. Moni Ovadia: expel the haters or we will go back to the dark times]. Avvenire (in Italian).
- Caffulli, Giuseppe; Giorgi, Carlo, eds. (2016). Gerusalemme: Dove tutti siamo nati [Jerusalem: Where We Were All Born] (in Italian). Fondazione Terra Santa. ISBN 978-8-862-40419-8.
- Calvini, Angela (24 August 2010). "Moni Ovadia: "Io e i rom a teatro contro il razzismo"" [Moni Ovadia: "Roma and I at the theatre against racism"]. Avvenire (in Italian).
- Capozzi, Rocco (Spring 2016). "Umberto Eco: Acute Observer of Our Social and Cultural History". Italica. 93 (3): 5–22. JSTOR 43896080.
- Costantino, Lorenza (2 April 2014). "Un genio che parlava 70 lingue: "Fu mio maestro, un clochard"" [A genius who spoke 70 languages: "He was my teacher, a homeless man"]. L'Arena (in Italian).
- De Giovannangeli, Umberto (11 September 2021). "Intervista a Moni Ovadia: 'Ma quale democrazia, l'Occidente ha fallito'" [Interview with Moni Ovadia: "But what democracy, the West has failed"]. Il Riformista (in Italian).
- De Giovannangeli, Umberto (12 April 2024). "'Chi nega l'etnocidio a Gaza è un vigliacco, il sionismo è diventato nazionalismo furioso', intervista a Moni Ovadia" ["Those who deny the ethnocide in Gaza are cowards, Zionism has become furious nationalism", interview with Moni Ovadia]. L'Unità (in Italian).
- Fagone La Zita, Nicolò (27 January 2025). "Moni Ovadia: «Il Giorno della Memoria ha fallito. Non ha senso ricordare la Shoah se non si lotta contro ogni forma di oppressione»". Corriere della Sera (in Italian).
- Ferrari, Chiara (29 October 2023). "Roberto Leydi, il cantore degli ultimi" [Roberto Leydi, the singer of the last]. Patria Indipendente (in Italian).
- Gruber, Ruth Ellen (2002). Virtually Jewish: Reinventing Jewish Culture in Europe. University of California Press. ISBN 978-0-520-92092-7.
- Gruber, Ruth Ellen (14 November 2013). "The actor who quit Milan's Jewish community". Jewish Telegraphic Agency.
- "Italian Actor Moni Ovadia Quits Milan Jewish Community". The Forward. 11 November 2013.
- "La lettera di 'un ebreo agli ebrei' di Moni Ovadia: 'In Israele la peggiore idolatria di sempre, quella della terra. C'è un nazionalismo fanatico e feroce'". Il Fatto Quotidiano. 4 June 2024.
- "The Journalism Prize 'Archivio Disarmo Golden Doves for Peace'" (PDF). Istituto di Ricerche Internazionali Archivio Disarmo-IRIAD. 2024.
- Leone, Massimo (2002). "Shoah and Humour: A Semiotic Approach". Jewish Studies Quarterly. 9 (2): 173–192. doi:10.1628/0944570022715680. JSTOR 40753305.
- Magris, Claudio (October–December 2003). "Identità ovvero incertezza" [Identity or Uncertainty]. Lettere Italiane. 55 (4): 519–527. JSTOR 26266859.
- Mincer, Laura (May–August 2000). "La tradizione rivisitata nel teatro yiddish di Moni Ovadia" [Tradition Revisited in Moni Ovadia's Yiddish Theatre]. La Rassegna Mensile di Israel. 3 (in Italian). 66 (2): 145–154. JSTOR 41287429.
- Murgese, Elisa (23 February 2016). "Funerali Umberto Eco, Moni Ovadia: 'Condividevamo la passione per le barzellette, notti intere a raccontarmi quelle sugli ebrei'" [Umberto Eco's funeral, Moni Ovadia: "We shared a passion for jokes, and spent entire nights telling me ones about Jews"]. Il Fatto Quotidiano (in Italian).
- "Moni Ovadia. La propensione universale dei popoli alla convivenza" [Moni Ovadia. The universal propensity of peoples to coexistence] (in Italian). Rai Radio 3. 2016.
- "Moni Ovadia. Prego Dio per liberarmi da Dio" [Moni Ovadia. I pray to God to free me from God]. Rai Cultura (in Italian). 13 January 2020.
- Ovadia, Moni (29 August 2014). "Io, ebreo, sostengo i diritti palestinesi. Ecco perché" [I, a Jew, support Palestinian rights. Here's why]. Il Fatto Quotidiano (in Italian).
- Ovadia, Moni; Pepino, Livio (2021). Un ebreo contro: Intervista [A Jew Against: Interview] (in Italian). Associazione Gruppo Abele Onlus/Edizioni Gruppo Abele. ISBN 978-8-865-79246-9.
- Pagura, Maresa (2013). SoundMakers: il festival della cultura accessibile [SoundMakers: the festival of accessible culture] (in Italian). Arte e cultura. Magazine di Informa disAbile.
- Puppa, Paolo (31 May 2009). "La Scena di Moni Ovadia" [Moni Ovadia's Stage]. Belfagor (in Italian). 64 (3): 315–322. JSTOR 26143525.
- Randone, Giulia (22 November 2017). "Il teatro di Moni Ovadia" [Moni Ovadia's Theatre] (PDF). Mimesis Journal – via University of Turin.
- Ruccia, Gisella (3 April 2024). "Gaza, Ovadia: 'Qui starnazzano di antisemitismo che non c'entra nulla. Quello commesso da Israele è etnocidio con carattere genocidiario'" [Gaza, Ovadia: "They're blathering about anti-Semitism here, which has nothing to do with it. What Israel is committing is ethnocide with a genocidal nature"]. Il Fatto Quotidiano.
- Rüthers, Monica (January 2010). "Sichtbare und unsichtbare Juden: Eine visuelle Geschichte des 'Ostjuden'" [Visible and Invisible Jews: A Visual History of the "Eastern Jew"]. Osteuropa (in German). 60 (1): 75–93. JSTOR 44935446.
- Shandler, Jeffrey (Spring 2004). "Postvernacular Yiddish: Language as a Performance Art". TDR (1988-). 48 (1): 19–43. doi:10.1162/105420404772990655. JSTOR 4488527. S2CID 57568353.
- Truzzi, Silvia (5 November 2013). "Moni Ovadia: 'Lascio la Comunità ebraica di Milano, fa propaganda a Israele'" [Moni Ovadia: "I leave the Jewish community of Milan, propaganda to Israel"]. Il Fatto Quotidiano (in Italian).
- "Two Bulgarian Clergymen honored as Righteous Among the Nations". Yad Vashem. 12 March 2002.
- Zaikowsky, Vered (September–October 2003). "Moni Ovadia, star of Italian theatre, discovers 'Yiddishkeit'". Eretz acheret. Translated by Zorrotranslations Web. Archived from the original on 12 May 2006 – via All About Jewish Theatre.
