= Nuovo Canzoniere Italiano =

Italian magazine

Nuovo Canzoniere Italiano was an Italian language music magazine published in Milan, Italy.

== History and profile ==
Nuovo Canzoniere Italiano was formed in 1964 in Milan by historian Gianni Bosio and ethnomusicologist Roberto Leydi. They were part of a musicians' group connected to the left-wing political - cultural movement of the late sixties. They aimed to establish a new musical movement to revive Italian popular music.

== Collaborators ==
- Nuccio Ambrosino
- Fausto Amodei
- Stefano Arrighetti
- Rudi Assuntino
- Dante Bellamio
- Cesare Bermani
- Gianni Bosio
- Caterina Bueno
- Paolo Ciarchi
- Franco Coggiola
- Giovanna Daffini
- Alberto D'Amico
- Ivan Della Mea
- Roberto Leydi
- Sergio Liberovici
- Giovanna Marini
- Giuseppe Morandi
- Piero Nissim
- Alessandro Portelli
- Riccardo Schwamenthal
- Michele Straniero

== See also ==
- List of magazines in Italy
