= Angelo My Love =

1983 film

- Film poster
- Directed by: Robert Duvall
- Written by: Robert Duvall
- Produced by: Robert Duvall
- Starring: Angelo Evans
- Cinematography: Joseph Friedman
- Edited by: Stephen Mack
- Music by: Michael Kamen
- Production company: Lorton Productions
- Distributed by: Cinecom International Films (United States and Canada); Lorimar Distribution International (International)
- Release date: 27 April 1983
- Running time: 115 minutes
- Country: United States
- Language: English

Angelo My Love is a 1983 American drama film written and directed by Robert Duvall and starring Angelo Evans. The screenplay is about New York City Romani people. It was screened out of competition at the 1983 Cannes Film Festival.

== Cast ==
- Angelo Evans as himself
- Michael Evans as himself
- Ruthie Evans as herself
- Tony Evans as himself
- Debbie Evans as herself
- Steve Tsigonoff as himself
- Millie Tsigonoff as herself
- Frankie Williams as himself
- George Nicholas as himself
- Katerina Ribraka as Patricia
- Timothy Phillips as School Teacher
- Lachlan Youngs as Student Reporter
- Jennifer Youngs as Student Reader

== Production ==
Robert Duvall first saw the lead actor, Angelo, in 1977 when he was 8 years old, having an argument with an older woman on Columbus Avenue that "sounded like a lovers quarrel." The screenplay for Angelo My Love was written by Duvall, with some dialogue improvised by the Romani actors, most of whom play themselves.

Besides Angelo are his older brother Michael, his fortune teller mother, his sister Debbie, and his girlfriend Patricia (Katerina Ribraka); his father Tony Evans, from the movie might have been thought to be absent, but is actually in a couple of scenes.

== Reception ==
"Angelo is a kind of idealized sum-total of all New York street kids no matter what their ethnic backgrounds. He is physically small but he has such a big, sharply defined personality that he seems to be a child possessed by the mind and experiences of a con man in his 20s. Then, as the movie goes on, one sees Angelo moving from glib, smart-talking self-assurance to childhood tears and back again, all in the space of a few seconds of screen time. This, too, may be part of Angelo's con, but it's also unexpectedly moving as well as funny. Angelo, among other things, is scared of ghosts."

Variety reported that Mr. Duvall spent five years and more than $1 million on the film and that many of the cast, including Angelo, did not read English.

San Francisco, New York, and Los Angeles commercial screenings were documented, with a Cinemax cable presentation in 1985.

In her 1985 novel, Exit to Eden (written as Anne Rampling), Anne Rice gives an extensive in-story review of this film.

== See also ==
- Mishka Ziganoff
