= Fair Game (1988 film) =

1988 Italian thriller film by Mario Orfini

- French poster
- Directed by: Mario Orfini
- Written by: Mario Orfini; Lidia Ravera
- Starring: Trudie Styler
- Cinematography: Dante Spinotti
- Edited by: Claudio M. Cutry
- Music by: Giorgio Moroder
- Distributed by: Warner Bros. Italia
- Release date: 1988
- Country: Italy
- Language: English

Fair Game (Italian: Mamba) is a 1988 Italian thriller-horror film written and directed by Mario Orfini.

== Plot ==
After being dumped by his girlfriend Eva, who was tired of his unrelentingly negative and sexist attitude, Gene decides to take revenge by killing her with a mamba, a venomous snake, into which he also injected hormones to increase its aggressiveness.

== Cast ==
- Trudie Styler as Eva
- Gregg Henry as Gene
- Bill Moseley as Frank

== Production ==
The film had a budget of 4.6 million dollars. Set design was made by Ferdinando Scarfiotti, while costumes were designed by Milena Canonero. It was shot between Los Angeles, Cinecittà and the Mojave Desert. To reproduce the movements of the mamba, Orfini used a steadicam technique.

== Reception ==
The film bombed at the Italian box office, grossing only 539,521,000 lire. It was distributed in 36 foreign countries.
