= Giovanna Daffini =

Italian singer (1914–1969)

Giovanna Daffini in 1964, photographed in Gualtieri by ethnomusicologist Giorgio Vezzani

Giovanna Daffini (22 April 1914 – 7 July 1969) was an Italian singer, associated with the Nuovo Canzoniere Italiano movement.

== Life ==
Born at Villa Saviola, in the province of Mantua, she started associating with travelling musicians from an early age. During the rice-growing season, she worked in the rice-growing districts of Novara and Vercelli; it was here that she learned the folk-songs which would eventually make her famous. Later, she was accompanied by her husband Vittorio Carpi on violin, with whom she would perform at wedding dances and country festivals.

In 1962, she recorded the song "Alla mattina appena alzata", a version of Bella Ciao, for the musicologists Gianni Bosio and Roberto Leydi.

She died at Gualtieri (Reggio Emilia), where she had spent much of her life, in 1969.

== Recordings ==
=== EP ===
- 1964 - La mariuleina - Canzoni padane (I dischi del sole) DS 32

=== LPs ===
- 1967 - Una voce un paese (I dischi del sole) DS 146/48
- 1975 - Amore mio non piangere (I dischi del sole) DS 1063/65

=== 45 ===
- 1967 - Festa d'aprile / Ama chi ti ama (I dischi del sole) LR 45/4

=== CD ===
- 1991 - L'amata genitrice (I dischi del mulo) 300 004-2

== Bibliography ==
- Maria Chiara Periotto (Ed.), Giovanna Daffini: il segno vitale del canto, Comune di Motteggiana 2001
- Cesare Bermani (Ed.), Giovanna Daffini, l'amata genitrice, Comune di Gualtieri 1993
- Serafino Prati, Giovanna Daffini cantastorie, Edizioni Libreria Rinascita 1975
- Aldo Vitale, in: Ethnomusicologie, éditions Paris 3, ACPI, 1978
