= Serhat Baran =

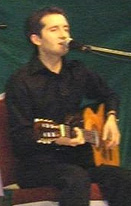
- Baran performing during a concert in 1999

Background information
- Also known as: Baran
- Born: Serhat Baran; 9 June 1974 (age 51); Istanbul, Turkey
- Genres: Rock, folk rock, worldbeat
- Occupations: Musician, singer-songwriter
- Instruments: Guitar, vocals

Serhat Baran is a Kurdish ethno-rock musician.

Baran was member of famous Kurdish ethno-rock band Koma Denge Azadi. He is a singer, composer and writes his own lyrics. In 1994 and 1998 he released two albums with this band ("Welate Min/Roj we be", 1994 and "Fedi", 1998), which sold over 200 thousand copies. With this Band he gave numerous concerts in Turkey, Germany, Belgium, Netherlands and United Kingdom. The music style of Koma Denge Azadi contains elements of traditional Kurdish music, rock, jazz and Anatolian rock.

Since 2003 he lives in Germany.

== Albums ==
=== 1994: Welate Min/Roj we be ===
Welate Min/Roj we be, the third album of music band Koma Dengê Azadi, was released in 1994 as MC and CD. The album has sold almost 100 thousand copies. The album contains fourteen original songs, all recorded live in the studio in Istanbul. Most of the songs in this album are rearranged authentic Kurdish folk songs like "Dera Sore" or "Erebo".

In this album Baran sings the songs "Agire Azadi", "Erebo", "Gul û xwin", "Yar degrim" and two title songs "Roj we be" and "Welate min".

He also wrote the lyrics of the songs "Welate min" and "Roj we be".

=== 1998: Fedi ===
Fedi, the fourth album of music band Koma Dengê Azadi, was released in 1998. In this album, Baran sings the songs "Dile Xemgin". and "Ax le kine", among others.
