= Vittorio Agnoletto =

European Parliament member

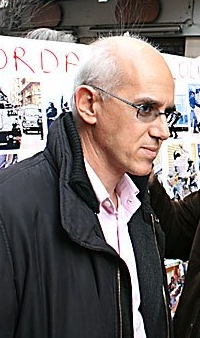
Vittorio Agnoletto

Vittorio Emanuele Agnoletto (born 6 March 1958 in Milan) is an Italian doctor, politician and a former Member of the European Parliament for the Southern Italy constituency. He was first elected in the 2004 European Parliament elections as independent on the Communist Refoundation Party (Italian: Partito della Rifondazione Comunista, PRC) list, part of the European Left. He was not re-elected in the 2009 European Parliament elections.

Agnoletto sat on the European Parliament's Committee on Foreign Affairs and was a substitute for the Committee on International Trade, and a substitute for the Delegation for relations with the United States.

== Career ==
A graduate in medicine and surgery at the University of Milan (1985), he specialized in occupational medicine, and became a co-founder (1987) and national chairman (1992–2001) of LILA - Italian League against AIDS. Since 1992, Agnoletto has been a lecturer and director of studies for training courses on AIDS at the Higher Institute of Health in Rome.

Between 1993 and 2001, he served as a member of the National Committee on AIDS of the Italian Ministry of Health, and a member of the National Coordinating Committee for action to combat drugs established under the Italian Prime Minister's office. Since 1994, he is a member of the International AIDS Society. He works with the International Organization for Migration on preventive medicine projects in the Balkans. Vittorio Agnoletto was a member of the European AIDS Treatment Group between 1994 and 2000. In 1994, he was awarded the title Doctor of the Year in 1994 by the journal Stampa medica.

Before joining the PRC, he was a member of Proletarian Democracy (and was a member of its National Secretariat in the 1980s). He was elected to the Milan Province Council in 1990 and served until 1995. A spokesman for the Genoa Social Forum during the 27th G8 summit in 2001, he became a member of the International Council of the World Social Forum.

His published works include the 2003 Prima persone: le nostre ragioni contro questa globalizzazione - published by Laterza. In 2011 he publishes, together with Lorenzo Guadagnucci, L'eclisse della Democrazia, Le verità nascoste sul G8 2001 a Genova (27th G8 summit) - published by Feltrinelli. With the musician Marco Fusi Agnoletto wrote a play of great success, also represented in the European Parliament in Brussels.
