= Koma Dengê Azadî =

Koma Dengê Azadî (Voice of Liberty), formed in Istanbul in 1990, was one of the most popular and longest-running Kurdish bands in Turkey. Like other Kurdish bands of the 90's, Koma Dengê Azadî adopted a style which was completely new for the Kurdish music scene, reinterpreting traditional Kurdish Music in a modern form with particular appeal to a young generation of urban Kurds and Turks. They also performed Kurdish translations of international songs such as "Bella Ciao".

Between 1991 and 1998, Koma Dengê Azadî has released four albums, all of which were at one point banned by the state. Despite the bans several hundred thousand copies of the albums were sold. Despite many of their concerts being banned in Turkey, they remained popular there and also gave numerous concerts in Germany, Belgium, Netherlands and United Kingdom.

== Music style and impact ==
The band interpreted many of their self-composed songs or traditional songs they covered in funk, funk-jazz, and rock’n’roll. Most of the popular songs of Koma Dengê Azadî have a funk rhythm. However, they differ from classical western funk songs by using oriental instruments such as Baglama, Duduk, and Mey alongside western instruments like guitar and trumpet. This blend is still unique today and is particularly noticeable in the intros of songs such as "Selimo", "Ax le kinê", "Berivan" and "Ez te bash nasdikim".

Many of the band’s songs have achieved cult status and have been covered countless times. Some of the most famous and most covered songs include "Selimo", "Hat karwanê Helebê", "Lo sivano", "Lêlê bejnê", "Dera sorê", "Roj roja me ye" and "Ax lê kinê".

Although the band only lasted for just under 7 years, it has had a lasting impact on Kurdish music, much like some other Kurdish bands from the 1990s. Koma Denge Azadi’s modern and urban music has made it easier for many young Kurds (and Turks) who have struggled to listen to traditional Kurdish songs to get into Kurdish music.

== Songs ==
Some of the most popular songs of this band are the following:

- Roj roja me ye
- Newroz tê
- Tew gulê narê
- No çi halo
- Selo
- Gul û xwîn
- Fedî
- Dilê xemgîn
- Dere sorê
- Lêlê Bejnê
- Dikim herim eskeriyê (Hat karwanê Helebê)

== Albums ==
- Hêvî (Hope), 1991
- Em Azadîxwaz in (We are liberty-loving), 1993
- Welatê min/Roj wê bê (My homeland), 1995
- Fedî (Shame), 1998

== Members ==
- Dilek
- İbrahim Erdem
- Ömer Avcı
- Serhat Karakas
- Nuri Erdem
- Serhat Baran
- Mehmet Atlı
- Sema Yiğit
- Ece Güner
- I. Halil Yıldız
- Hakan Ener

== Additional Sources ==
- Guner, Hasan (2007):"Kom'lar ve Kürt müzigi". In: Esmer Dergisi, 05.2007, Istanbul
- Kurdish Wikipedia
- Kurdshow.com
- Kurdish magazin
- Musika Kurdi, Lyrics of Koma Denge Azadi
- Cafrande.org
