= Ivan Della Mea =

- Birth name: Luigi Della Mea
- Born: 16 October 1940
- Origin: Lucca, Italy
- Died: 14 June 2009 (aged 68); Milan, Italy
- Genres: Folk music
- Occupation: Singer-songwriter
- Instrument(s): Vocals, guitar
- Years active: 1962–2009
- Labels: I dischi del sole Vedette

Ivan Della Mea (born Luigi Della Mea, 16 October 1940 – 14 June 2009) was an Italian novelist, journalist, singer-songwriter and political activist.

== Biography ==
Born in Lucca, his family moved to Milan when he was a child. He worked in a factory, but eventually started to work at a small newspaper, Stasera.

In 1956 he joined the Italian Communist Party (PCI). He started his career as a singer and songwriter in Milanese dialect the same year.

In the 1960s, he belonged to the Italian Nuova canzone politica and became active in the magazine Nuovo Canzoniere Italiano. As a writer he started publishing some works in the 1980s/1990s, including three novels, and as a journalist. With his brother, Luciano, he wrote for Il Grandevetro, and worked at l'Unità and Liberazione.

His brother was political activist Luciano Della Mea (1924–2003).

== Discography ==
=== Albums ===
- Io so che un giorno (1966, LP)
- Il rosso è diventato giallo (1979, LP)
- La balorda (1972, LP)
- Se qualcuno ti fa morto (1972, LP)
- Ringhera (1974, LP)
- Fiaba grande (1975, LP)
- La piccola ragione di allegria (1978, LP)
- Sudadio giudabestia (1979, LP)
- Sudadio giudabestia 2 (1980, LP)
- Karlett (1983, LP)
- Ho male all'orologio (1997, CD)
- La cantagranda forse walzer (2000, CD)

=== EP and 45 rpm ===
- Ballate della violenza (1962, EP)
- Ho letto sul giornale (1964, EP)
- La mia vita ormai (1965, EP)
- O cara moglie/Io ti chiedo di fare all'amore (1966, 45 rpm)
- Ciò che voi non-dite/La linea rossa (1967, 45 rpm, with G.Marini)
- La nave dei folli (EP, 1972)

== Literature ==
Works of Ivan Della Mea:

- Il sasso dentro (1990; Interno Giallo editions)
- Se nasco un'altra volta ci rinuncio (1992; Interno Giallo editions)
- Sveglia sul buio (1997; Est editions)
