= Lidia Ravera =

Lidia Ravera (born 6 February 1951, Turin, Piedmont) is an Italian writer, journalist, essayist and screenwriter.

Ravera has been a regular contributor to the italian edition of Cosmopolitan. Her most popular novel, Porci con le ali (Winged Pigs), dealt with the disillusionment of her generation with the ideals of the late 1960s. In 1977 Ravera wrote a film adaptation of the book.

She'a an atheist.

== Bibliography ==
- Porci con le ali (1976, with Marco Lombardo Radice)
- Ammazzare il tempo (1978)
- Bambino mio (1979)
- Bagna i fiori e aspettami (1986)
- Per funghi (1987)
- Se dico perdo l'America (1988)
- Voi grandi (1990)
- Tempi supplementari (1990)
- Due volte vent'anni (1992)
- In quale nascondiglio del cuore: lettera a un figlio adolescente (1993)
- Il paese di Eseap (1994)
- Sorelle ("Sisters", 1994)
- I compiti delle vacanze (1997)
- Nessuno al suo posto (1998)
- Maledetta gioventù (1999)
- Né giovani né vecchi (2000)
- Un lungo inverno fiorito e altre storie (2001)
- Il paese all'incontrario (2002)
- La festa è finita (2002)
- Il freddo dentro (2003)
- In fondo, a sinistra... (2005)

== Screenplays ==
- Porci con le ali (1977)
- Maschio Femmina Fiore Frutto (1979)
- Oggetti smarriti (1980)
- Adamo ed Eva, la prima storia d'amore (1982)
- Pathos - un sapore di paura (1987)
- Fair Game (1988)
- 32 dicembre (1988)
- Amori in corso (1989)
- Due madri per Rocco (1994)
- Dopo la tempesta (1995)
- Due volte vent'anni (1995)
- Un nero per casa (1998)
- Il Dolce Rumore Della Vita (1999)
- Una vita in gioco (TV series)
- Una vita in gioco 2. Dopo la tempesta (TV series)

== Theater ==
- Comprami! (2012, with Marco Fusi)
- Nuda proprietà (2014)
