= Mondina =

Female workers in rice paddy fields

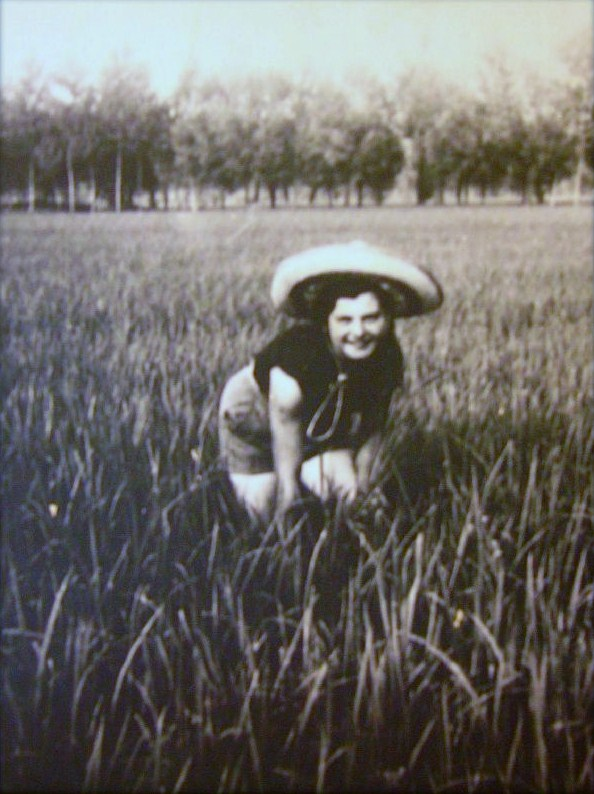
A mondina

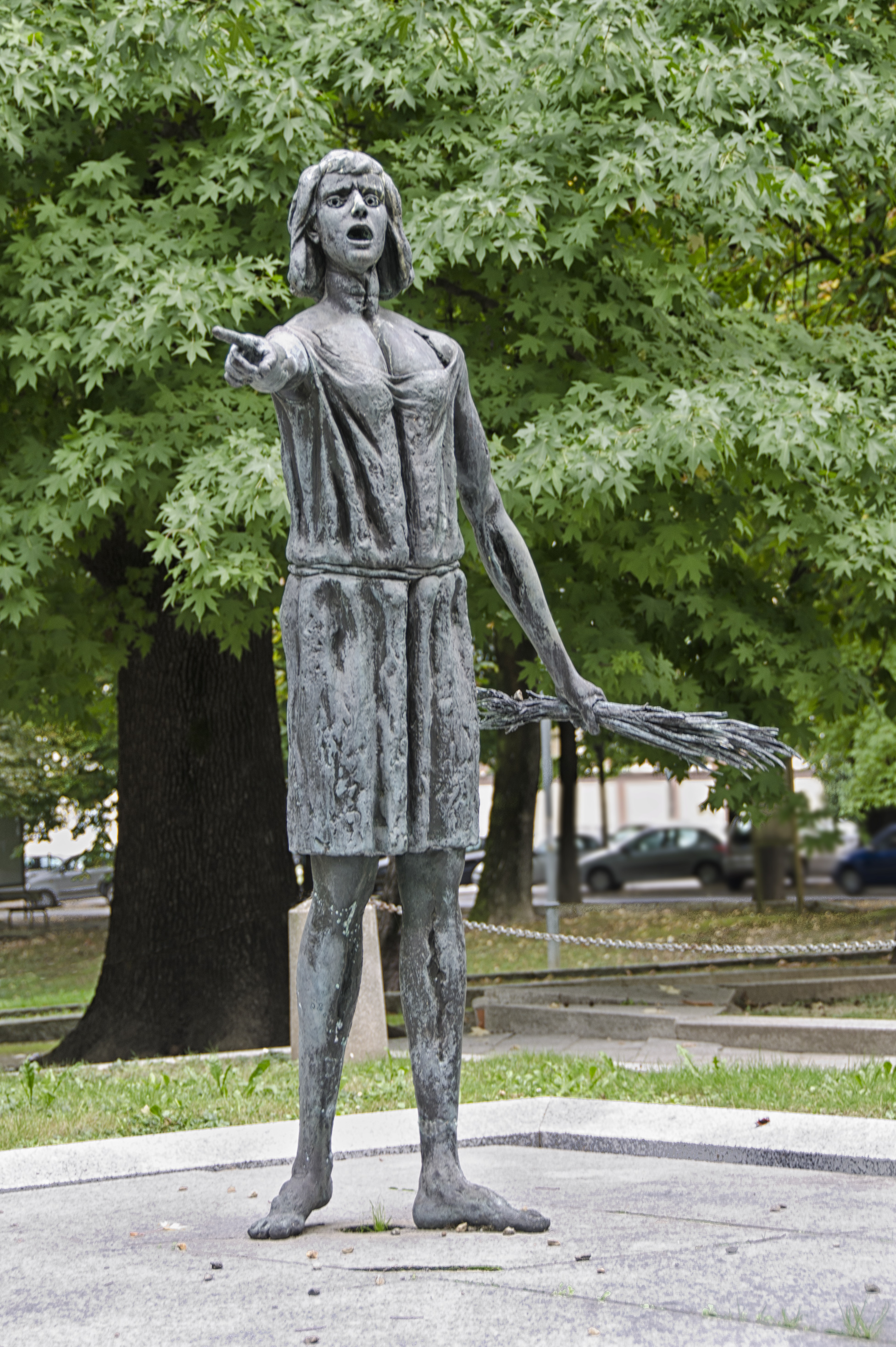
A monument for the mondine in Vercelli

A mondina (Italian: [monˈdiːna]; pl.: mondine; from the verb mondare, meaning 'to peel', 'to husk', 'to clean', or 'to weed') is a seasonal rice paddy female worker, especially in Italy's Po Valley from the late 19th century to the first half of the 20th; though this practice traces back to about 600 years.

The work of monda (weeding) was widespread in northern Italy in that era. The work consisted of removing the weeds growing in rice fields that hindered the healthy growth of young rice plants. It took place during the flooding of the fields, from the end of April to the beginning of June every year, during which the delicate shoots needed to be protected, during the first stages of their development, from temperature differences between the day and the night. It consisted of two phases: transplanting the plants and pruning the weeds.

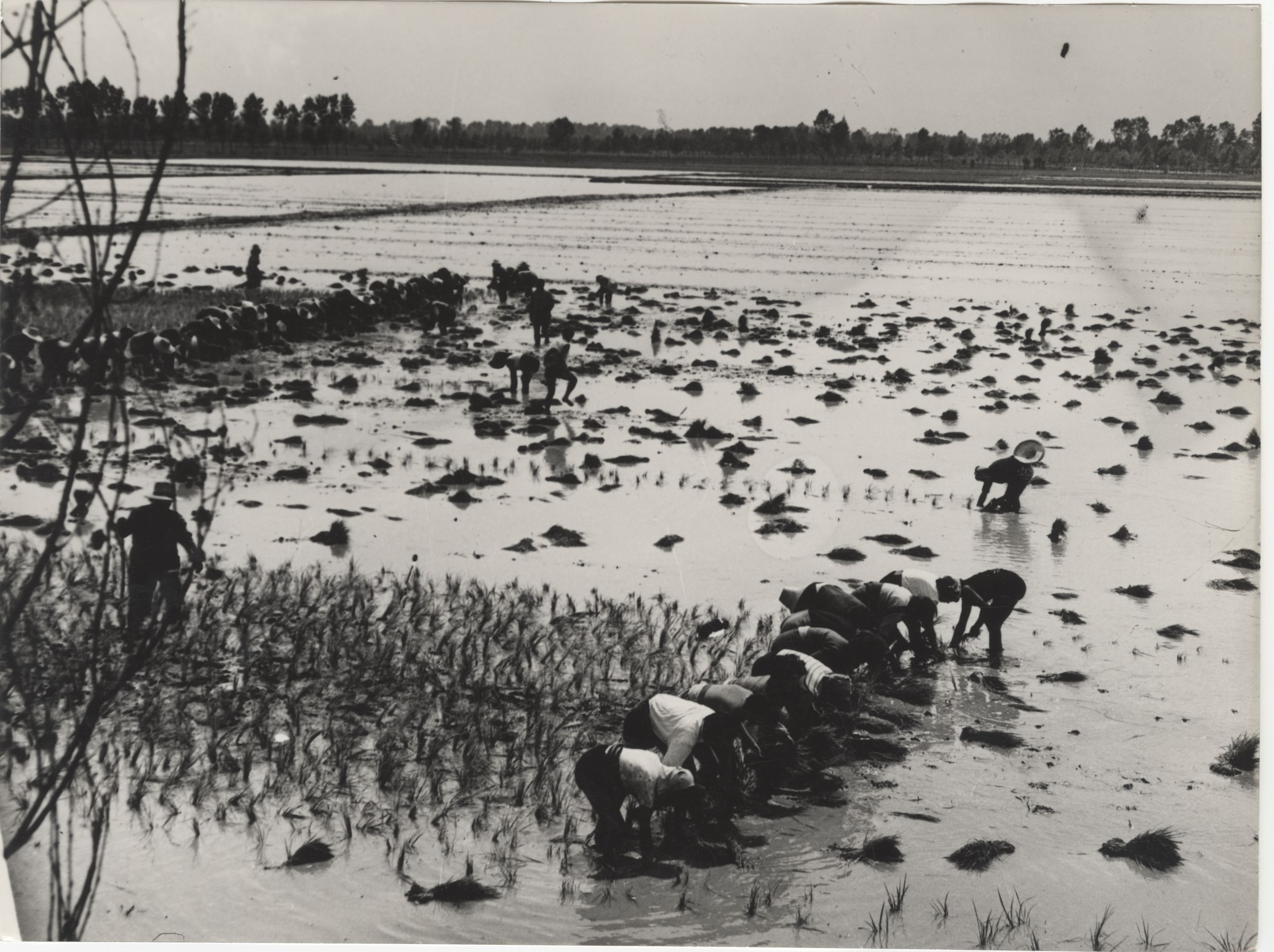
Mondine transplanting rice seedlings into paddy fields in Novara's country side in 1955

The monda was an extremely tiring task, carried out mostly by women of the poorest social classes from Emilia-Romagna, Veneto, Lombardy and Piedmont, working in northern Italy, mostly around Vercelli, Novara and Pavia. The workers would spend their workdays with their bare feet in water up to their knees and their back bent for many hours. To protect themselves from insects and the sun, the workers would wear a scarf and a hat with broad brim and shorts or large panties so as not to wet their clothes. Commuting was often practiced by riding bikes to work.

The atrocious working conditions, long hours and very low pay led to constant dissatisfaction and, at times to rebellious movements and riots in the early years of the 20th century. The struggles against the supervising padroni; (owners/boss); were even harder with the abundance of clandestine workers ready to compromise even further the already low wages just to get work. They are described as crumiri; strikebreakers; The practice of the strikebreaking resulted in popular protests. The demands of the protesting rioters were finally satisfied between 1906 and 1909, when all the communes of the Province of Vercelli were required to abide by the eight-hours restriction.

== Popular culture ==
The strike breaking practice also resulted in protest songs like "Se otto ore vi sembran poche" aimed at limiting the working day to eight hours or "Sciur padrun da li belli braghi bianchi" aimed at the work patrons and supervisors. The work of the mondine also inspired many popular songs such as "Alla mattina appena alzata", popular since the late 19th century, which is considered the origin of "Bella ciao", the anti-fascist song from the Second World War. The fate of the mondine was also displayed in literature works and later in cinematographic works, the most famous being the 1949 film Bitter Rice (Riso amaro).

== Bibliography ==
- (in Italian) F. Castelli, E. Jona, A. Lovatto, Senti le rane che cantano. Canzoni e vissuti popolari della risaia, Donzelli, 2005 ISBN 8879899430
- (in Italian) M. Minardi, La fatica delle donne. Storie di mondine, Ediesse, 2005 ISBN 8823010829
- (in Italian) B.Bassi, La mia vita, Negretto, Mantova, 2009 ISBN 9788895967158
