= Caterina Bueno =

Italian singer and folk music historian

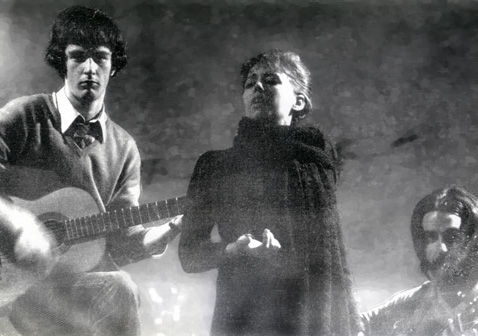

Background information
- Born: 2 April 1943
- Origin: Fiesole (Italy)
- Died: 16 July 2007 (aged 64)
- Genres: Folk
- Occupation: Singer
- Instrument: Vocals
- Years active: 1963–2007
- Labels: I dischi del sole, Fonit Cetra

Caterina Bueno (2 April 1943 – 16 July 2007) was an Italian singer and folk music historian.

== Biography ==
Starting in the 1960s, her research and performances of Italian folk songs, particularly those of Tuscany, are credited to bringing a new awareness of Italian folk music.

Bueno was born in San Domenico di Fiesole to her Spanish father, painter Xavier Bueno, and Swiss mother, the writer Julia Chamorel. She taught herself to play the guitar and collected folk records, generally of Tuscany origin. She became active at the l'Istituto Ernesto De Martino and later the magazine Nuovo Canzoniere Italiano.

She has worked with many artists in her career including Francesco De Gregori who dedicated his song "Caterina" to her.

== Albums ==
- 1964 -La brunettina – Canzoni, rispetti e stornelli toscani- (I dischi del sole)
- 1968 – La veglia – (I dischi del sole)
- 1969 – La Toscana di Caterina – (I dischi del sole)
- 1970 – In giro per la Toscana – (Amico)
- 1973 – Eran tre falciatori – (Fonit Cetra)
- 1974 – Se vi assiste la memoria – (Fonit Cetra)
- 1976 – Il trenino della "Leggera" – (Fonit Cetra)
- 1997 – Canti di maremma e d'anarchia – (Libera Informazione Editrice)
- 1998 – Caterina Bueno in spettacolo canzoni paradossali e storie popolari di dolente attualità (Supreme)
- 2001 – Caterina Bueno dal vivo (Compagnia Nuove Indye (CNI))
- 2005 – Eran tre falciatori – Se vi assiste la memoria – Il trenino della "leggera"] (Warner Music)
- 2007 – Dal vivo / live – Firenze 1975 Caterina Bueno e Coro degli Etruschi (Pegasus)

== Singles ==
- 1976 – Italia bella mostrati gentile/La "Leggera" (from a television performance) – (Fonit Cetra)

Bueno was also featured in the 1999 Italian folk collection CD The Great Ladies of Italian Folk Music (Buda Musique)

== References and further reading ==
- Enciclopedia della canzone italiana, di Autori Vari (a cura di Gino Castaldo), ed. Curcio, 1990; alla voce "Bueno, Caterina", di Ambrogio Sparagna, pag. 228
- Agamennone, Maurizio. "Per Caterina Bueno, in occasione del conferimento del "Fiorino d'oro"". Il Cantastorie.
