= Ferdinando Scarfiotti =

Italian art director (1941–1994)

- Born: 6 March 1941; Potenza Picena, Marche, Italy
- Died: 30 April 1994 (aged 53); Los Angeles, California, U.S.
- Occupation: Art director
- Years active: 1968–1994

Ferdinando Scarfiotti (6 March 1941 – 30 April 1994) was an Italian art director and production designer.

After graduating in architecture at the University of Rome, he was approached by Luchino Visconti, who asked him to design his stage production of La Traviata for the 1963 Spoleto Festival. After working in opera theatre for over a decade, director Bernardo Bertolucci asked Scarfiotti to work with him on the film The Conformist (1970) followed by Visconti's Death in Venice (1971). In 1980, he moved to Los Angeles, where he worked on a number of films, including American Gigolo (1980), Cat People (1982) and Scarface (1983).

Scarfiotti won a BAFTA Award for Death in Venice in 1971 and an Academy Award in the category Best Art Direction for the film The Last Emperor in 1987.

== Selected filmography ==
- The Conformist (1970)
- Death in Venice (1971)
- Daisy Miller (1974)
- American Gigolo (1980)
- Cat People (1982)
- Scarface (1983)
- The Last Emperor (1987)
- Fair Game (1988)
- The Sheltering Sky (1990)
- Toys (1992)

== See also ==
- Art Directors Guild Hall of Fame
