= Shiraz (singer) =

Lebanese singer

- Born: 19 September 1982 (age 43)

Shiraz (Arabic: شيراز; born 19 September 1982) is a Lebanese singer who represented Lebanon at Miss Earth.

== Career ==
Shiraz has released the songs Kif Badak Aani Tghib, Gamara, and Ayesh Ma3aya.

For two years in a row, Shiraz participated in the International Beirut Marathon since 2015, and sang to crowds in Downtown Beirut and Beirut Water Front (Biel). In 2015, Shiraz launched a university tour that covered a number of educational institutions in Lebanon, such as Notre Dame University–Louaize and the University of Balamand.

== Awards ==
Shiraz won the Murex d'Or and was awarded the title of The Star of The Youth Song.

== Discography ==
- Layalik
- Chou Ba'amel Bhal Alb
- Sahart Ayouni
- Layalik Remix
- Amount Wansak
- Kif Badak Aani Tghib
- Gamara
- Ayech Ma3aya
- Sahar Sahar
- Ba'ed Lyawm
- Agmal Wahda
- Bella Ciao Bel Arabi
