= Paolo Pietrangeli =

Italian film director (1945–2021)

- Born: 29 April 1945; Rome, Italy
- Died: 22 November 2021 (aged 76); Rome, Italy
- Occupations: Film director Screenwriter
- Years active: 1975–2001

Paolo Pietrangeli (29 April 1945 – 22 November 2021) was an Italian singer-songwriter, film director and screenwriter. He directed six films between 1975 and 2001. His 1977 film Pigs Have Wings was entered into the 27th Berlin International Film Festival.

He died on 22 November 2021, at the age of 76.
