= Mishka Ziganoff =

Russian musician

- Born: 15 January 1889; Odesa, Kherson Governorate, Russian Empire
- Died: February 1967 (aged 78) New York City, U.S.

Misha Demitro Tsiganoff better known as Mishka Ziganoff, sometimes also spelled as Tziganoff (January 15, 1889 – February 1967), was a Russian born American musician of Romani descent.

== Biography ==
Misha, son of Yanchie Demitro Tsiganoff and Vorgja Nickolama, was a Roma musician originally from Odesa, then part of the Russian Empire, who moved to New York at the beginning of the 20th-century, where he opened a restaurant.

Virtuoso accordionist, Mishka Ziganoff, despite being a Christian, was well versed in Yiddish and Klezmer music.

In 1919, he recorded a disc that contained the song "Koilen", whose melody, as reported by the research by the scholar Fausto Giovannardi, would be very similar and probably would have inspired a part of the melody of the famous Italian partisan song "Bella ciao".

According to the scholar Rod Hamilton, of The British Library in London, "Koilen" would be a version of Eastern-Jewish traditional song "Dus Zekele Koilen" (standard yiddish: דאָס זעקעלע קוילן Dos Zekele Koiln, This Bag of Coal), of which there are various versions dating back to the early 1900s.

He died in New York in February 1967 and was buried in Linden's Rosedale Cemetery.

Ziganoff is mentioned in the 1983 film Angelo My Love, written and directed by Robert Duvall.
