= Marco Fusi (clarinetist) =

Italian clarinetist and composer

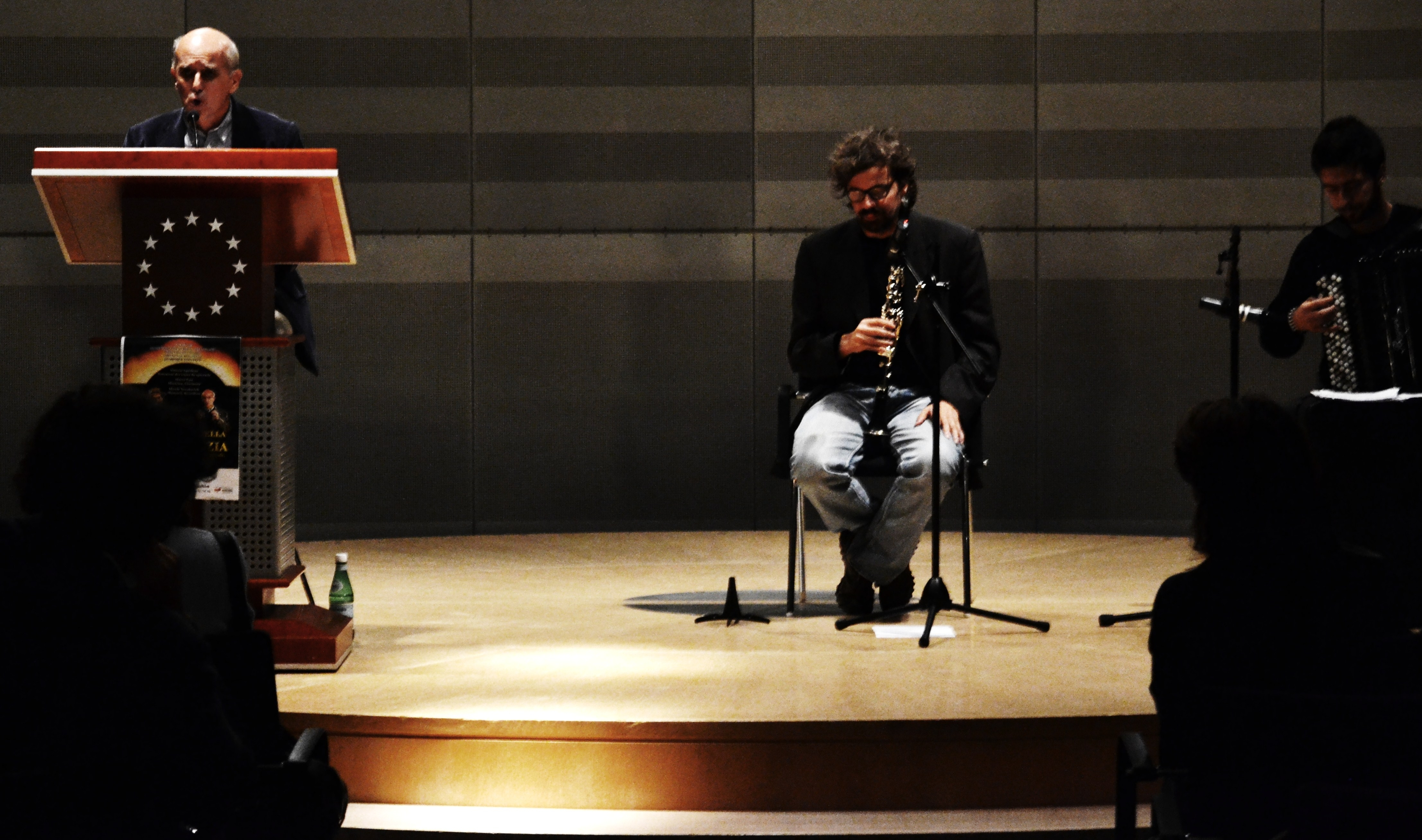
Marco Fusi at the European Parliament

Marco Fusi (born 1972) is an Italian clarinetist and composer.

== Career ==
In 2002, he founded the group Yesh Gvul, with whom he recorded two albums, Moon Waltz and Addio a Lugano, distributed all over the world, with the collaboration of Moni Ovadia and Vladimir Denissenkov. With his ensemble cast has worked with institutions such as the Club Tenco Sanremo, Jeunesses musicales International and Fondazione Collegio San Carlo Marco Fusi has also worked as a solo artist in tandem with Vladimir Denissenkov.

As composer Fusi has collaborated with journalist and presenter Antonio Lubrano, for which he wrote the music for the show Il Favoliere, represented with great success in a tour in Italian theaters and on Rai 2, the national Italian television channel, by the same Lubrano and Fusi.

In 2008 and 2009 he was the protagonist of the show Refusnik Tango, which was attended by important names of Italian cultural scene: Ottavia Piccolo, Moni Ovadia, Lidia Ravera, Ricky Gianco, Renato Sarti. Fusi was greatly appreciated by the Undersecretary of Education Nando dalla Chiesa which in 2010 named him to perform in the new year celebrations in Genoa.

He also collaborated with Lidia Ravera writing with her Comprami!, show of civic engagement on violence against women In 2012 he wrote with Vittorio Agnoletto L'eclisse della democrazia , which gets very positive feedback, so that Agnoletto and Fusi are invited to represent it at the European Parliament in Brussels.

Also in 2012 he was invited to perform on National Television of Serbia.

In 2014 he was given the International Award Artelario - Villa Vigoni for his work as a composer for the theater.

The influences of his compositions are music of Balkans and Eastern Europe, klezmer, jazz and classical music.

Alongside his musical career, Marco Fusi has been a prominent advocate for civil rights and freedom of artistic expression. His legal battle regarding artistic freedom in public spaces gained international attention, leading to an official parliamentary inquiry at the European Parliament European Parliament, Parliamentary questions, 14 April 2016, E-002883-16, "Freedom of artistic expression".Furthermore, he is an established author of philosophical and anthropological essays published and held by the Sacred Heart Catholic University (Università Cattolica del Sacro Cuore) in Milan.

== Discography ==
- Moon Waltz (Ethnoworld)
- Addio a Lugano (Music Center)
- Sulla Memoria (with Moni Ovadia, Alexian and Others) (CNI)
- La strada della luna (Music center)

== Works for the theater ==
- Il Favoliere, by Antonio Lubrano e Marco Fusi.
- Comprami! by Lidia Ravera and Marco Fusi.
- L'Eclisse della democrazia by Vittorio Agnoletto e Marco Fusi.
- Refusnik Tango, with the participation of Marco Fusi Ensemble, Ottavia Piccolo, Renato Sarti, Moni Ovadia, Ricky Gianco, Lidia Ravera.
- Il Lago maestro by Marco Fusi and Giuseppe Guin.

== Awards and acknowledgments ==
- International Prize Artelario - Villa Vigoni.
