= Roberto Leydi =

Italian ethnomusicologist

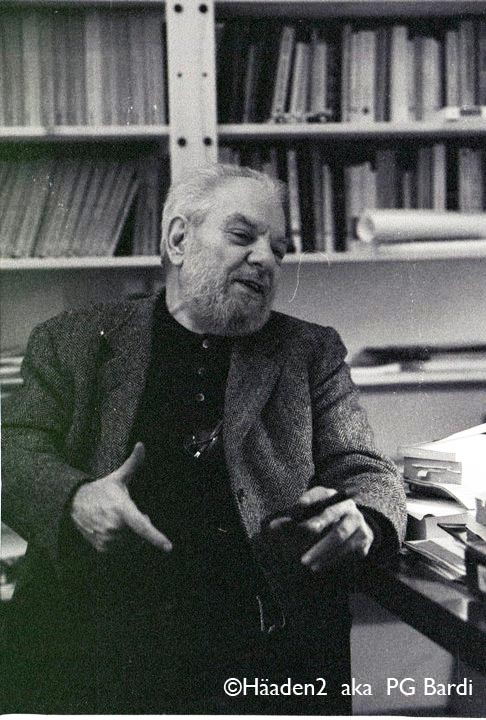
Roberto Leydi, Milan, 1994

Roberto Leydi (21 February 1928, in Ivrea – 15 February 2003, in Milan) was an Italian ethnomusicologist.

He started his career in the field of contemporary music and jazz, and in the 1950s started his research into the social significance of folk and popular music. He published widely, including L'altra musica (The Other Music; ed. Giunti-Ricordi 1991) and I canti popolari italiani, (Italian folksongs; Mondadori, 1973.) He was known as sponsor and coordinator of numerous projects and festivals to display and preserve Italian music, both traditional and recent. Shortly before his death, he donated his entire private collection (some 700 musical instruments, 6'000 records, 10'000 books, and 1'000 tapes) to the Centro di dialettologia e di etnografia (Center for Dialectology and Ethnography) in Bellinzona, Switzerland.

== Works ==
- L' altra musica. Etnomusicologia, Lucca, LIM, 2008
- L' influenza turco-ottomana e zingara nella musica dei Balcani, Nico Staiti, Nicola Scaldaferri (a cura di), Udine, Nota, 2004
- Gli strumenti musicali e l'etnografia italiana (1881-1911) /Roberto Leydi, Febo Guizzi, Lucca, LIM, 1996
- L'altra musica, Giunti-Ricordi, 1991
- I canti popolari italiani, Mondadori, 1973
- Musica popolare e musica primitiva, Torino-Eri, 1959

== See also ==
- Nuovo Canzoniere Italiano

== Bibliography ==
- Marcello Sorce Keller, "En souvenir de Roberto Leydi (1928-2003) – Les origines et l’évolution de l’éthnomusicologie en Italie", Cahiers de musiques traditionnelles, XVII/2004, pp. 297–314; republished as "Un ricordo di Roberto Leydi (1928-2003): un’occasione per riflettere sulle origini dell’etnomusicologia in Italia", Cenobio, LIV(2005), no. 2, pp. 145–162.
