= Targa Tenco =

Italian music award

The Targa Tenco ("Tenco Plaque") is a prize awarded annually by the Club Tenco. Founded in 1984, it has a large jury of 200 journalists and critics awarding the best works of the year. It is considered the most prestigious award in Italian music.

== Winners ==
The winners of Targa Tenco awards are:

=== Best Song ===
- 1984 – Gino Paoli – "Averti addosso"
- 1985 – Paolo Conte – "Sotto le stelle del Jazz"
- 1986 – Lucio Dalla – "Caruso"
- 1987 – Francesco Guccini and Juan Carlos Biondini – "Scirocco"
- 1988 – Ivano Fossati – "Questi posti davanti al mare"
- 1989 – Enzo Jannacci and Maurizio Bassi – "Se me lo dicevi prima"
- 1990 – Francesco Guccini – "Canzone delle domande consuete"
- 1991 – Fabrizio De André and Mauro Pagani – "La domenica delle salme"
- 1992 – Franco Battiato – "Povera patria"
- 1993 – Luigi Grechi – "Il bandito e il campione"
- 1994 – David Riondino – "La ballata del sì e del no"
- 1995 – Daniele Silvestri – "Le cose in comune"
- 1996 – Luciano Ligabue – "Certe notti"
- 1997 – Fabrizio De André and Ivano Fossati – "Princesa"
- 1998 – Francesco De Gregori – "La valigia dell'attore"
- 1999 – Paolo Conte – "Roba di Amilcare"
- 2000 – Francesco Guccini and Luciano Ligabue – "Ho ancora la forza"
- 2001 – Giorgio Gaber and Sandro Luporini – "La razza in estinzione"
- 2002 – Enzo and Paolo Jannacci – "Lettera da lontano"
- 2003 – Enzo Jannacci – "L'uomo a metà"
- 2004 – Samuele Bersani – "Cattiva "
- 2005 – Paolo Conte – "Elegia"
- 2006–2013 – not assigned
- 2014 – Virginiana Miller – "Lettera di San Paolo agli operai"
- 2015 – Cristina Donà and Saverio Lanza – "Il senso delle cose" / Samuele Bersani, Pacifico and Francesco Guccini – "Le storie che non conosci" (ex aequo)
- 2016 – Francesco Di Giacomo and Paolo Sentinelli – "Bomba intelligente"
- 2017 – Brunori Sas – "La verità"
- 2018 – Mirkoeilcane – "Stiamo tutti bene"
- 2019 – Daniele Silvestri with Manuel Agnelli and Rancore – "Argentovivo"
- 2020 – Tosca – "Ho amato tutto"
- 2021 – Madame – "Voce"
- 2022 – Elisa – "O forse sei tu"
- 2023 – Niccolò Fabi – "Andare oltre"
- 2024 – Diodato – "La mia terra"
- 2025 – Lucio Corsi – "Volevo essere un duro"
- 2026 – Emma Nolde – "Quello che deve essere sarà"

=== Best Album ===
- 1984 – Fabrizio De André – Crêuza de mä
- 1985 – Paolo Conte – Paolo Conte
- 1986 – Ivano Fossati – 700 giorni
- 1987 – Paolo Conte – Aguaplano
- 1988 – Francesco De Gregori – Terra di nessuno
- 1989 – Francesco De Gregori – Mira Mare 19.4.89
- 1990 – Ivano Fossati – Discanto
- 1991 – Fabrizio De André – Le nuvole
- 1992 – Ivano Fossati – Lindbergh – Lettere da sopra la pioggia
- 1993 – Paolo Conte – 900
- 1994 – Francesco Guccini – Parnassius Guccinii
- 1995 – Pino Daniele – Non calpestare i fiori nel deserto
- 1996 – Ivano Fossati – Macramé
- 1997 – Fabrizio De André – Anime salve
- 1998 – Vasco Rossi – Canzoni per me
- 1999 – Franco Battiato – Gommalacca
- 2000 – Samuele Bersani – L'oroscopo speciale
- 2001 – Vinicio Capossela – Canzoni a manovella / Francesco De Gregori – Amore nel pomeriggio (ex aequo)
- 2002 – Daniele Silvestri – Unò-dué
- 2003 – Giorgio Gaber – Io non mi sento italiano
- 2004 – Samuele Bersani – Caramella smog
- 2005 – Francesco De Gregori – Pezzi
- 2006 – Vinicio Capossela – Ovunque proteggi
- 2007 – Gianmaria Testa – Da questa parte del mare
- 2008 – Baustelle – Amen
- 2009 – Max Manfredi – Luna Persa
- 2010 – Carmen Consoli – Elettra
- 2011 – Vinicio Capossela – Marinai – profeti e balene
- 2012 – Afterhours – Padania / Zibba & Almalibre – Come il suono dei passi sulla neve (ex aequo)
- 2013 – Niccolò Fabi – Ecco
- 2014 – Caparezza – Museica
- 2015 – Mauro Ermanno Giovanardi – Il mio stile
- 2016 – Niccolò Fabi – Una somma di piccole cose
- 2017 – Claudio Lolli – Il grande freddo
- 2018 – Motta – Vivere o morire
- 2019 – Vinicio Capossela – Ballate per uomini e bestie
- 2020 – Brunori Sas – Cip!
- 2021 – Samuele Bersani – Cinema Samuele
- 2022 – Marracash – Noi, loro, gli altri
- 2023 – Vinicio Capossela – Tredici canzoni urgenti
- 2024 – Paolo Benvegnù – È inutile parlare d’amore
- 2025 – Lucio Corsi – Volevo essere un duro
- 2026 – Caparezza – Orbit Orbit

=== Best Performer ===
- 1984 – Ornella Vanoni – Uomini
- 1985 – Alice – Gioielli rubati
- 1986 – Gianni Morandi – In teatro
- 1987 – Mina – Rane supreme
- 1988 – Fiorella Mannoia – Canzoni per parlare
- 1989 – Mia Martini – Martini Mia
- 1990 – Fiorella Mannoia – Di terra e di vento
- 1991 – Pietra Montecorvino – Segnorita
- 1992 – Fiorella Mannoia – I treni a vapore
- 1993 – Peppe Barra – Mo' vene
- 1994 – Tiziana Ghiglioni – Tiziana Ghiglioni canta Luigi Tenco
- 1995 – Fiorella Mannoia – Gente comune
- 1996 – Nicola Arigliano – I sing ancora
- 1997 – Tosca – Incontri e passaggi
- 1998 – Patty Pravo – Notti – guai e libertà
- 1999 – Fiorella Mannoia – Certe piccole voci
- 2000 – Franco Battiato – Fleurs
- 2001 – La Crus – Crocevia
- 2002 – Têtes de Bois – Léo Ferré – l'amore e la rivolta
- 2003 – Francesco De Gregori and Giovanna Marini – Il fischio del vapore
- 2004 – Fiorella Mannoia – Concerti
- 2005 – Morgan – Non al denaro non all'amore nè al cielo
- 2006 – Petra Magoni & Ferruccio Spinetti – Musica nuda 2
- 2007 – Têtes de Bois – Avanti pop
- 2008 – Eugenio Finardi, Sentieri Selvaggi & Carlo Boccadoro – Il cantante al microfono – Eugenio Finardi interpreta Vladimir Vysotzky
- 2009 – Ginevra Di Marco – Donna Ginevra
- 2010 – Avion Travel – Nino Rota l'amico magico
- 2011 – Roberta Alloisio – Janua
- 2012 – Francesco Baccini – Baccini canta Tenco
- 2013 – Mauro Ermanno Giovanardi and Sinfonico Honolulu – Maledetto colui che è solo
- 2014 – Raiz & Fausto Mesolella – Dago Red
- 2015 – Têtes de Bois – Extra
- 2016 – Peppe Voltarelli – Voltarelli canta Profazio
- 2017 – Ginevra Di Marco – La rubia canta la negra
- 2018 – Fabio Cinti – La voce del padrone – Un adattamento gentile
- 2019 – Alessio Lega – Nella corte dell'arbat. Le canzoni di Bulat Okudzava
- 2020 – Tosca – Morabeza
- 2021 – Peppe Voltarelli – Planetario
- 2022 – Simona Molinari – Petali
- 2023 – Alice – Eri con me– Sedici canzoni di Franco Battiato / Francesco Guccini – Canzoni da intorto (ex aequo)
- 2024 – Simona Molinari – Hasta Siempre Mercedes
- 2025 – Ginevra Di Marco – Kailedoscope
- 2026 – Avincola – Avincola canta Carella

=== Best Debut Album ===
- 1984 – Lucio Quarantotto – Di mattina molto presto
- 1985 – not assigned
- 1986 – not assigned
- 1987 – Marco Ongaro – Ai
- 1988 – Mariella Nava – Per paura o per amore
- 1989 – Francesco Baccini – Cartoons
- 1990 – Max Manfredi – Le parole del gatto
- 1991 – Mauro Pagani – Passa la bellezza / Vinicio Capossela – All'una e trentacinque circa (ex aequo)
- 1992 – Pino Pavone – Maledetti amici
- 1993 – Mau Mau – Sauta Rabel
- 1994 – Almamegretta – Anima migrante
- 1995 – La Crus – La Crus
- 1996 – Claudio Sanfilippo – Stile libero
- 1997 – Cristina Donà – Tregua
- 1998 – Elisa – Pipes & Flowers
- 1999 – Quintorigo – Rospo
- 2000 – Ginevra Di Marco – Trama tenue
- 2001 – Pacifico – Pacifico
- 2002 – Sergio Cammariere – Dalla pace del mare lontano
- 2003 – Morgan – Canzoni dell'appartamento
- 2004 – Alessio Lega and Mariposa – Resistenza e amore
- 2005 – not assigned
- 2006 – Simone Cristicchi – Fabbricante di canzoni
- 2007 – Ardecore – Chimera
- 2008 – Le luci della centrale elettrica – Canzoni da spiaggia deturpata
- 2009 – Elisir – Pere e cioccolato
- 2010 – Piero Sidoti – Genteinattesa
- 2011 – Cristiano Angelini – L'ombra della mosca
- 2012 – Colapesce – Un meraviglioso declino
- 2013 – Appino – Il Testamento
- 2014 – Filippo Graziani – Le cose belle
- 2015 – La Scapigliatura – La Scapigliatura
- 2016 – Motta – La fine dei vent'anni
- 2017 – Lastanzadigreta – Creature selvagge
- 2018 – Giuseppe Anastasi – Canzone ravvicinate del vecchio tipo
- 2019 – Fulminacci – La vita veramente
- 2020 – Paolo Jannacci – Canterò
- 2021 – Madame – Madame
- 2022 – Ditonellapiaga – Camouflage
- 2023 – Daniela Pes – Spira
- 2024 – Elisa Ridolfi – Curami l'anima
- 2025 – Anna Castiglia – Mi piace
- 2026 – Piji – Sta registrando audio…

=== Best Work in a Dialect ===
Initially awarded to the best dialectal song, since 1996 it goes to the best album mostly performed in a regional language (referred to as a "dialect" in Italy).

- 1984 – Fabrizio De André and Mauro Pagani – "Creuza de mä"
- 1985 – Maria Carta – "A David a ninnia"
- 1986 – Enzo Gragnaniello – "Giacomino"
- 1987 – Gualtiero Bertelli – "Barche de carta"
- 1988 – Teresa De Sio – "'A neve e 'o sole"
- 1989 – Pino Daniele – "Schizzechea"
- 1990 – Enzo Gragnaniello – "Fuijente"
- 1991 – Tazenda – "Disamparados"
- 1992 – Pitura Freska – "Pin Floi"
- 1993 – Pino Daniele and Chick Corea – "Sicily"
- 1994 – 99 Posse – "Curre curre guagliò"
- 1995 – Almamegretta – "Sanacore"
- 1996 – Agricantus – Tuareg
- 1997 – Sensasciou – Generazione con la x
- 1998 – Daniele Sepe – Lavorare stanca
- 1999 – Enzo Gragnaniello – Oltre gli alberi
- 2000 – 99 Posse – La vida que vendrá
- 2001 – Almamegretta – Imaginaria
- 2002 – Davide Van de Sfroos – ...E semm partii
- 2003 – Sud Sound System – Lontano
- 2004 – Lou Dalfin – L'òste del diau
- 2005 – Enzo Jannacci – Milano 3-6-2005
- 2006 – Lucilla Galeazzi – Amore e acciaio
- 2007 – Andrea Parodi & Elena Ledda – Rosa Resolza
- 2008 – Davide Van de Sfroos – Pica!
- 2009 – Enzo Avitabile – Napoletana
- 2010 – Peppe Voltarelli – Ultima notte a Malà Strana
- 2011 – Patrizia Laquidara and Hotel Rif – Il canto dell'anguana
- 2012 – Enzo Avitabile – Black Tarantella
- 2013 – Cesare Basile – Cesare Basile
- 2014 – Loris Vescovo – Penisolâti
- 2015 – Cesare Basile – Tu prenditi l'amore che vuoi e non chiederlo più
- 2016 – Claudia Crabuzza – Com un soldat
- 2017 – Canio Loguercio and Alessandro D'Alessandro – Canti, ballate e ipocondrie d'ammore
- 2018 – Francesca Incudine – Tarakè
- 2019 – Enzo Gragnaniello – Lo chiamavano vient' 'e terra
- 2020 – Nuova Compagnia di Canto Popolare Napoli 1534. Tra moresche e villanelle
- 2021 – Fratelli Mancuso – Manzamà
- 2022 – 'A67 – Jastemma
- 2023 – Almamegretta – Senghe
- 2024 – Setak – Assamanù
- 2025 – La Niña – Furèsta
- 2026 – Carmen Consoli – Amuri Luci

== See also ==
- Club Tenco
