= Daniela Pes =

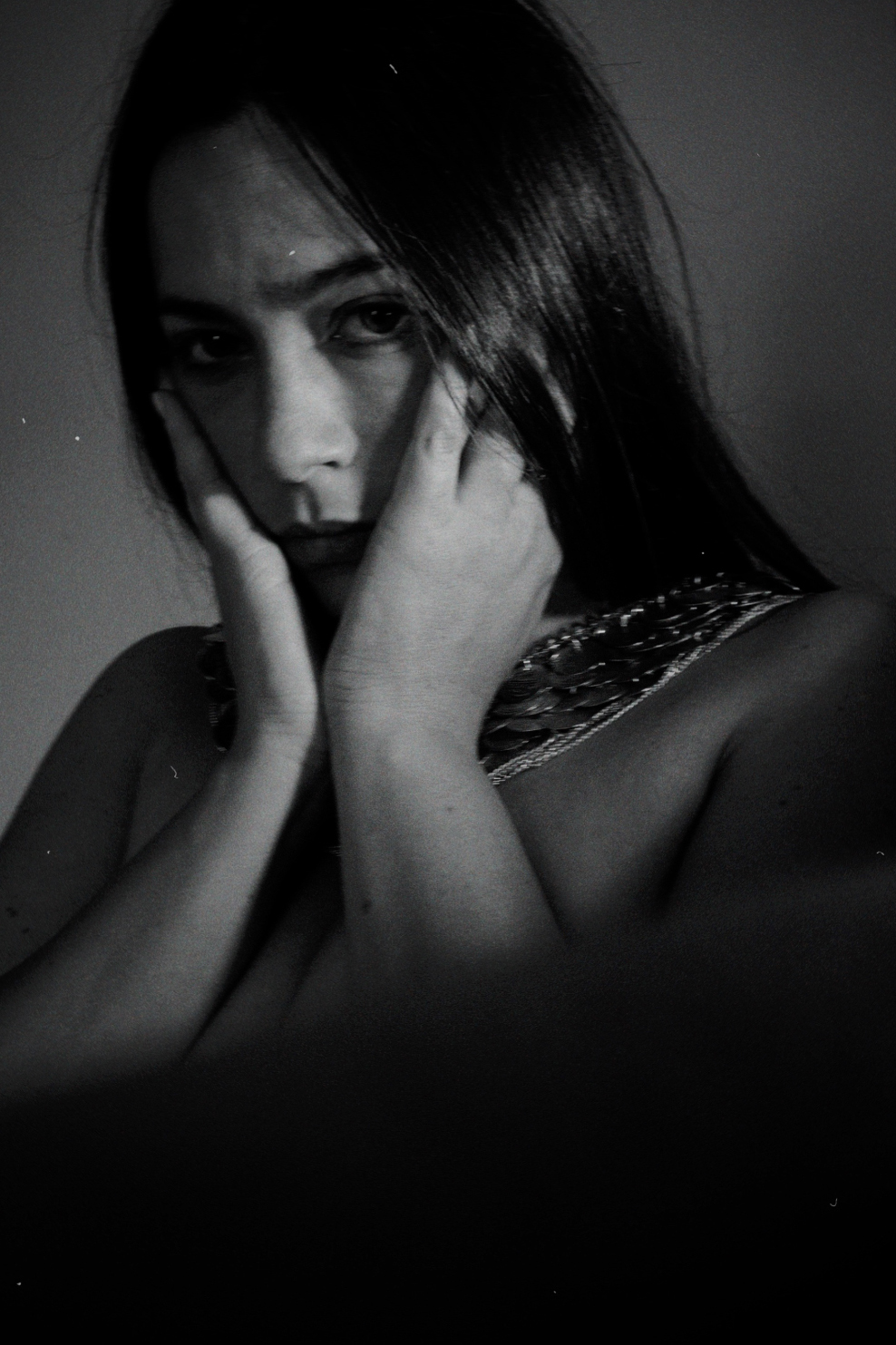

Background information
- Born: 1992 (age 33–34); Tempio Pausania, Sardinia (Italy)
- Genres: Electronic music; Jazz; Folk
- Occupations: Songwriter, singer
- Instruments: Vocals; piano; guitar; synths
- Years active: 2016–present
- Labels: Tanca Records
- Website: https://www.danielapes.com

Daniela Pes (born 1992) is an Italian musician and songwriter.

== Biography ==
Daniela Pes was born in Tempio Pausania, a town in the Gallura region of northern Sardinia, Italy, in the province of Sassari.

In 2016 she graduated in jazz singing at the Luigi Canepa Conservatory of Sassari. With Dora Scapolatempore she founded The Dalthes, a harp and voice duo that re-proposes various repertoires in an electronic jazz key and with which in 2016 she performed at the Harp Festival in Rio de Janeiro.

== Solo career ==
She set to music the poems written in Gallurese dialect by Gavino Pes, an eighteenth-century priest, his fellow citizen, and in 2017 she participated in the Andrea Parodi Award, winning the overall prize and that of criticism.

In 2018 she took part in the Musicultura Festival where she won the NuovoImaie and Best Music awards.

On 14 April 2023 she released her first studio album Spira which was produced by Iosonouncane and with which she won the Tenco Award as best debut album. The album is promoted by a tour that touches various parts of Italy.

In October 2023 she was a guest in the television show Via dei Matti nº0 broadcast on Rai 3 hosted by Stefano Bollani. In the same year she was also a guest in some concerts by Vinicio Capossela.

From May 2023, she began a tour of approximately 120 concerts in Europe. During the tour, she met French director Vincent Moon, which culminated in the filming of an unreleased version of A te sola for the Blogotheque series.

On September 18, 2024, she collaborated with the fashion house Etro for the soundtrack of the show at Milan Fashion Week SS 2025, performing live with a currently unreleased piece.

In October 2024, her name was announced among the 15 nominations for the Music Moves European Awards 2025.

== Discography ==
=== Solo studio albums ===
- Spira (2023)
