= My Fault =

My Fault may refer to:

== Music ==
- "My Fault", a song by !!! from Wallop
- "My Fault", a song by Eminem from The Slim Shady LP
- "My Fault", a song by Imagine Dragons from Continued Silence EP
- "My Fault", a song by Tech N9ne from Planet
- "My Fault (Ghetto Apology)", a song by Nivea

== Other uses ==
- My Fault (film), a 2023 Spanish romance film
- "My Fault" (Scrubs), a third season episode of Scrubs

== See also ==
- Mea Culpa (disambiguation)
