= Spira (album) =

Studio album by Daniela Pes
- Released: 14 April 2023
- Genre: Electronic music; experimental music
- Length: 38:24
- Language: Italian; Gallurese
- Label: Tanca Records
- Producer: Iosonouncane

Singles from Spira
- 1. "Carme" Released: 23 March 2023

Professional ratings
Review scores
Source	Rating
Ondarock	8/10
Rockol	8/10

Spira is the debut album by Italian singer-songwriter Daniela Pes, released on 14 April 2023.

== Overview ==
The album was released on 14 April 2023 by Tanca Records and was awarded the 2023 Tenco Prize for Best Debut Work.

The production was handled by Iosonouncane.

== Track listing ==
Lyrics and music by Daniela Pes, except where noted.

No.	Title	Music	Length
1.	"Ca Mira"		4:53
2.	"Illa sera"		4:03
3.	"Carme"		5:14
4.	"Ora"	Iosonouncane	3:35
5.	"Làira"		4:57
6.	"Arca"	Daniela Pes; Iosonouncane	5:24
7.	"A te sola"		10:18
Total length:			38:24

== Personnel ==
=== Musicians ===
- Daniela Pes - vocals, guitar, synth, sampler
- Iosonouncane - guitar, bass
- Federico Pazzona - bass (voice)
- Mariagiulia Degli Amori - percussion
- Sandro Fresi - hurdy-gurdy
- Luca Vargiu - guitar

=== Technical ===
- Bruno Germano - mixing
- Carl Staff - mastering
- Carlo Schramm - studio assistant

=== Visuals ===
- Piera Masala - photography
- Riccardo Mura - phonetic transcriptions
- Vieri Cervelli Montel - design
