= Istentales =

Sardinian musical band

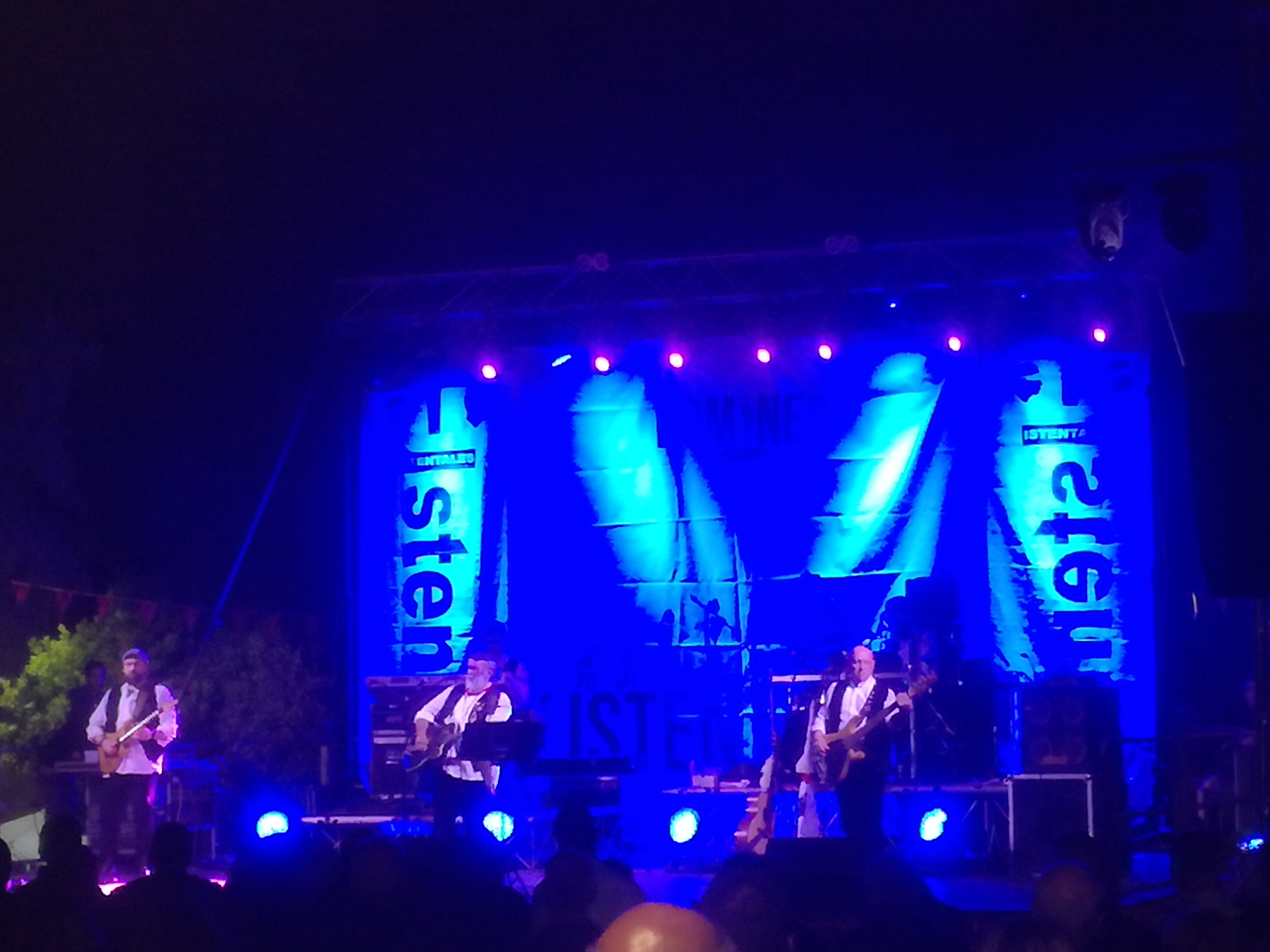
- Istentales (Tissi 2022)

Background information
- Origin: Sardinia, Italy
- Genres: Pop rock; electronic; folk rock; pop
- Years active: 1995–present
- Members: Gigi Sanna; Sandro Canova; Luciano Pigliari; Luca Floris
- Past members: Luca Chessa; Davide Guiso; Simone Pala; Gian Piero Carta; Daniele Barbato

Istentales is a Sardinian ethnic pop-rock band. The group was formed in Sardinia in 1995 in Nuoro in Sardinia by Gigi Sanna.

== History ==
The name of the band is taken from one of the most important constellations of the Northern Hemisphere cell, which in Italian is narrated by Orion. This constellation is based on the antiquity of the gabbale, which is oriented towards shepherds and masseurs, and is therefore rooted in the collective imagination of the Sardinian people. In 2003 the Istentales wrote the piece "Pro unu frore" for the daughter of Matteo Boe, killed in 2003 while she was on the balcony. The group was formed in 1995 in Nuoro in Sardinia. In 2002, the band collaborated and realized a singled called "Promissas" with Pierangelo Bertoli. In 2006, the saxophonist Simone Pala joined the group and Istentales released the album "Dae Sa Die ... A Sa Notte". In 2016, they made a tour with Tullio De Piscopo and also together with the Tazenda, another big folk band from Sardinia for the feast of Sant'Agostino in Muravera. In 2017 the band published the single "Notte E Luna"fe at. Danilo Sacco. In 2018 they realized the new single called "Lumeras" feat. Maria Luisa Congiu. In 2022, they released their album "Homines", featuring the single "O Sardigna" in feat. with Elio ( de Le Storie Tese) and Tenores di Neoneli, the barbaric band presents the second single from their new album, called “Sciopero” feat. with Modena City Ramblers.

== Other work ==
The Istentales band also owns an agritourism called "Fattoria Istentale" in Nuoro. In addition to the agritourism, the band organize events where they also welcome the classes of elementary school children where they show how to make cheese and raise animals.

== Discography ==
=== Studio albums ===
- 1995 - "Istentales"
- 1996 - "Naralu Tue"
- 1997 - "Istentales sempre con voi".
- 2000 - "Amsicora".
- 2002 - "Deo no isco".
- 2004 - "Annos".
- 2005 - "Juan Peron Piras due nomi una persona" (live).
- 2005 - "Due in uno..." (collida de sos primos duos album).
- 2006 - "Animu".
- 2007 - "Su Mezus", (CD-DVD).
- 2008 - "Dae sa die...a sa notte".
- 2020 - Tra il Sacro e Il Profano.
- 2022 - Homines.

=== Singles ===
- 2002 - "Viene per Noi" (feat. Pierangelo Bertoli)
- 2002 - "Promisas" (feat. Pierangelo Bertoli)
- 2017 - "Notte E Luna" (feat. Danilo Sacco)
- 2018 - "Lumeras" (feat. Maria Luisa Congiu)
- 2022 - “O Sardigna” (feat. Elio from de Le Storie Tese)
- 2022 - “Sciopero” (feat. Modena City Ramblers)

== Line-up ==
=== Members ===
- Gigi Sanna – lead vocals & guitars (1995–present)
- Sandro Canova – bass, backing vocals (1995–present)
- Luciano Pigliari - keyboards (1995–present)
- Luca Floris – drums (1995–present)

=== Past members ===
- Paolo Fresu - flugelhorn (2006–2007)
- Luca Chessa - guitars
- Davide Guiso - guitars & flugelhorn
- Simone Pala - saxophone (2006–2008)
- Gian Piero Carta - saxophone
- Daniele Barbato - keyboards
- Massimiliano Ruiu - keyboards (2016)

== Cooperations ==
- Paolo Fresu
- Nomadi
- Modena City Ramblers
- Elio e le Storie Tese
- Tullio De Piscopo
- Pierangelo Bertoli
- Benito Urgu
- Roberto Vecchioni
- Eugenio Finardi
- Cordas e Cannas
