= Pierangelo Bertoli =

Italian singer-songwriter (1942–2002)

- Born: 5 November 1942; Sassuolo, Italy
- Died: 7 October 2002 (aged 59) Modena, Italy
- Genres: Folk rock, Folk pop
- Occupation: Singer-songwriter
- Instruments: Vocals, guitar
- Years active: 1974–2002
- Labels: CGD, Ascolto, Dischi Ricordi
- Website: Bertoli Fans Club

Pierangelo Bertoli (5 November 1942 – 7 October 2002) was an Italian singer-songwriter and poet. Close to libertarian communist issues, his works were mainly about environment, laïcité, antimilitarism and social issues regarding marginalised and rebellious people.

== Biography ==
Born in Sassuolo, in the Province of Modena, and belonging to a working-class family, when he was four, he developed poliomyelitis and he lost use of his legs. He started his career as a singer at the end of 1973 with the album Rosso colore dell'amore (1974) and one year later with the self-produced album Roca Blues. One of his most famous albums was A muso duro of 1979.

In 1990, he collaborated with Elio e le Storie Tese. In 1991 (with Tazenda) and 1992, he took part in the Sanremo Music Festival.

His last album, 301 guerre fa (2002) was composed with the collaboration of his son Alberto and Luciano Ligabue. He also collaborated and released a single called "Promissas" with the Sardinian band Istentales. Bertoli died in Modena on 7 October 2002 of a heart attack due to a tumour.

Married to Bruna, Bertoli had 3 children, Emiliano, Petra and Alberto, also a singer-songwriter.

== Discography ==
- Rosso colore dell'amore (1974)
- Roca Blues (1975)
- Eppure soffia (1976)
- Il centro del fiume (1977)
- S'at ven in meint (1978)
- A muso duro (1979)
- Certi momenti (1980)
- Album (1981)
- Frammenti (1983)
- Dalla finestra (1984)
- Petra (1985)
- Canzone d'autore (1987)
- Tra me e me (1988)
- Sedia elettrica (1989)
- Oracoli (1990)
- Italia d'oro (1992)
- Gli anni miei (1993)
- Una voce tra due fuochi (1995)
- Angoli di vita (1997)
- 301 guerre fa (2002)
- Promissas (2002, single)

== Sources ==
- Straniero, Michele (1981). Pierangelo Bertoli. Lato Side.
- Mangiardi, Domenico (2001). "Pierangelo Bertoli : I "certi momenti". Bastogi. ISBN 88-8185-404-X.
- Mangiardi, Domenico (2006). Pierangelo Bertoli: Un emiliano tragico non è un vero emiliano. Giunti. ISBN 978-88-09-04973-4.
