= Savina Yannatou =

Greek singer (born 1959)

Savina Yannatou Σαβίνα Γιαννάτου
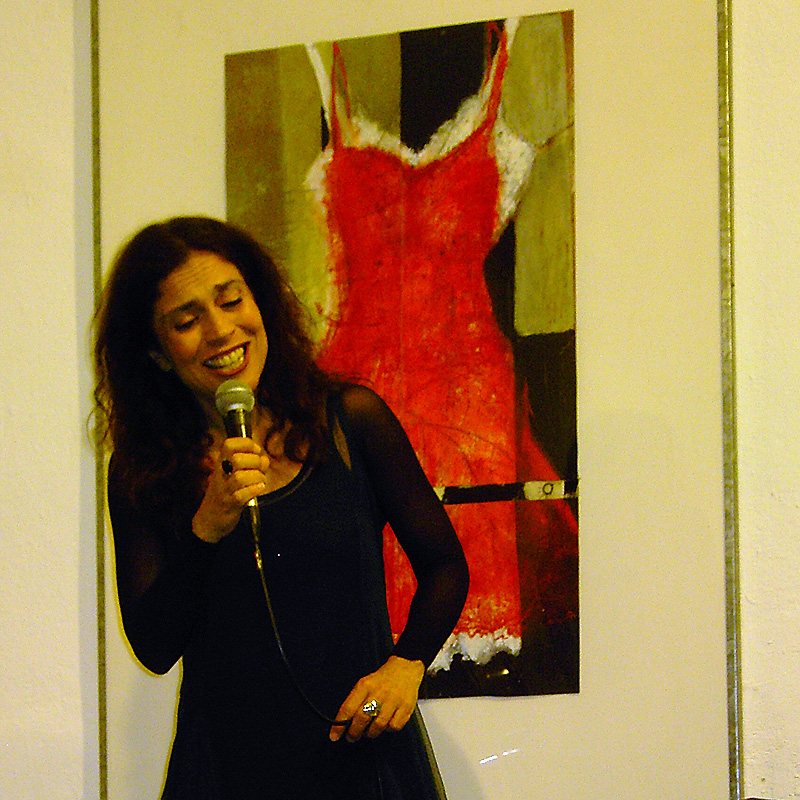
- Savina Yannatou, April 2009

Background information
- Born: 16 March 1959 (age 67); Athens, Greece
- Occupations: Vocalist, composer
- Instruments: Vocals, guitar
- Website: https://www.savinayannatou.com

Savina Yannatou (Greek: Σαβίνα Γιαννάτου, Savína Yannátou; born 16 March 1959) is a Greek singer. In 2025, Jude Rogers of The Guardian wrote, "Savina Yannatou is a fabulous Greek singer whose work over the last five decades hasn’t stood still. Her [work] includes interpretations of early music, throat singing, composing for video art and improvisations with Can’s Damo Suzuki."

== Biography ==
After taking classical guitar lessons and participating in the children's choir of Yannis Nousias for some years, she studied singing with Gogo Georgilopoulou and Spiros Sakkas in Athens, and later attended postgraduate studies at the Guildhall School of Music and Drama in London. In 1979 she began working as a professional and two years later participated in the recording of the critically acclaimed album Εδώ Λιλιπούπολη ("Lilipoupolis here", that is, "We are broadcasting from Lilipoupolis"); following that, her career took off and has since released numerous albums, collaborating with many Greek composers. In the mid-1990s, she joined forces with select jazz / traditional musicians forming a band known as Primavera en Salonico, which started by interpreting Sephardic and Mediterranean songs, but later expanded to music from various areas of the world. Gradually, she has extended her vocal techniques to include throat singing, glossolalia and ululations among others.

Besides that, her repertoire consists mainly of Greek music, although she has been a founding member of an Early music ensemble (Εργαστήρι Παλιάς Μουσικής), and has always displayed a keen interest in exploring free jazz and avant-garde music. Said explorations have led her to on- and off-stage collaborations and sessions with international musicians such as Barry Guy, Peter Kowald, Floros Floridis, Günther Pitscheider, Gerald Preinfalk of the band BPM, Ken Vandermark, Sussan Deyhim, Damo Suzuki of the krautrock group Can, and Kiya Tabassian of the Ensemble Constantinople.

Yannatou is also a songwriter ("Dreams of the mermaid. Is king Alexander alive?", "Rosa das Rosas", "Musique Des Chambres"), as well as a composer for theatre, dance theatre and video art. She occasionally participates in select workshops, teaching vocal improvisations to actors and musicians. Most all of her early albums were published by Greek music label Lyra. Starting with her Sumiglia album (2005), Yannatou has released most of her albums on the ECM record label.

== Discography and participations ==
Releases (solo/group/compilations) (Note: Compilations containing previously released material are not included):

Year	Album	Album Artist	Label
1980	Εδώ Λιλιπούπολη	Manos Hadjidakis – Various artists	Columbia – Minos EMI
1981	Σαμποτάζ	Lena Platonos	Lyra
1982	Κέρκυρα ’82: Αγώνες Ελληνικού τραγουδιού	Manos Hadjidakis – Various artists Live Recording	Κέρκυρα – Minos EMI
1982	Καρυωτάκης, 13 τραγούδια	Savina Yannatou & Lena Platonos	Lyra
1983	Ρεβάνς (O.S.T.)	Dimitris Papadimitriou	Lyra
1983	Το '62 του Μανου Χατζιδάκι	Savina Yannatou & Lena Platonos	Lyra
1985	Εν Αθήναις	Nikos Kypourgos	Lyra
1985	Ερωτόκριτος και Αρετούσα	Nikos Mamangakis	Σείριος – Minos EMI
1985	Η ηχώ και τα λάθη της	Lena Platonos	Σείριος – Minos EMI
1985	Μίλα μου για μήλα	Stavros Papastavrou	Σείριος – Minos EMI
1985	Lullabies; Νανουρίσματα	Savina Yannatou	Lyra
1985	Ο Οδυσσέας στο ποτάμι	Michalis Gregoriou	Σείριος – Minos EMI
1986	Dreams of the Mermaid. Is king Alexander alive? Ζει ο βασιλιάς Αλέξανδρος;	Savina Yannatou	Lyra
1986	New excursion Νέα εκδρομή	Elena Papandreou	Lyra
1986	Λεπιδόπτερα	Lena Platonos	Lyra
1986	Μinimal suite – Double image	Vangelis Katsoulis	Praxis
1988	Το αηδόνι του αυτοκράτορα Του Hans Christian Andersen	Lena Platonos	Lyra
1990	Μαρία Ντολόρες παρελθόν	Dimitris Maragkopoulos	Σείριος – MBI
1990	Το φλυτζάνι	Petros Dourdoubakis	Lyra
1991	Ερωτική πρόβα	Dimitris Lagios	Columbia – Sony Music
1992	Africa (O.S.T.)	Panagiotis Kalantzopoulos	Cantini
1992	Ίνα τί	Dimitris Lagios	Minos EMI
1993	Die zweite Heimat (O.S.T.); New arrangements and performances inspired by the film	Nikos Mamangakis	Milan – Sony BMG
1993	Ατασθαλίες	Vasilis Nikolaidis	Lyra
1994	Masko	Savina Yannatou & Nikos Touliatos	Cήμαντρον; Εμσε
1994	Φέρτε τα!	Aera Patera	Olon Music
1995	Spring in Salonica: Sephardic folk songs Άνοιξη στη Σαλονίκη: Σεφαραδίτικα λαϊκά τραγούδια Primavera en Salonico: Canciones populares Sefardíes	Savina Yannatou & Primavera en Salonico	Lyra
1995	Εάλω η Πόλις. Θρήνοι για την άλωση της Κωνσταντινούπολης	Early Music Workshop	FM Records
1996	Ιστορίες αποχαιρετισμού. Μουσική για τις παραστάσεις της εταιρείας θεάτρου Διπλούς Έρως	Dimitris Kamarotos	Theseum
1997	What summer is made for. Live at Rivermead Reading, 1996 WOMAD Festival	Various artists Live Recording	Womad Select
1997	Αναπνοές	Lena Platonos with Savina Yannatou	Lyra
1997	Αποχαιρετισμοί της θάλασσας Ποίση Τάκη Σινόπουλου – Άρη Αλεξάνδρου	Michalis Gregoriou	Minos EMI
1997	Μελωδίες της ανατολής. Τραγούδια της Σμύρνης	Various Artists; Compilation	FM Records
1997	Μέσ' απ' το σκοτάδι Through the darkness	Vangelis Katsoulis	Lyra
1997	Προστάτης οικογένειας (O.S.T.)	Nikos Mamangakis	Δίφωνο
1997	Σκοτεινή πράξη. Ορατόριο σε ποίηση Τάσου Λειβαδίτη	Michalis Gregoriou	Lyra
1997	Τέμπλο; Templo	Giorgos Christianakis	Virgin Greece
1998	Vananda	Andreas Georgiou	Libra Music
1998	Zoolixo Λίγο	Zoolixo Ligo	E2
1998	Όπως η θάλασσα	Omadiki Αpodrasi	Lyra
1998	The photographers (O.S.T.); Οι φωτογράφοι	Nikolas Gkinis	Κίνησις
1998	Mediterranea: Songs of the Mediterranean; Τραγούδια της Μεσογείου	Savina Yannatou & Primavera en Salonico	Lyra; Sounds True
1999	Μικρές αγγελίες	Michalis Siganidis	Lyra
1999	Μικρό έπος για τον Ανδρέα Ροδινό	Nikos Mamangakis	Sony Music; Ιδαία
1999	Virgin Maries of the world Παναγιές του κόσμου	Savina Yannatou & Primavera en Salonico	Lyra
1999	Shores of twilight (O.S.T.); Τα ρόδινα ακρογιάλια	Dimitris Katakouzinos	Ostria – Eros
2000	Rosa das rosas	Savina Yannatou	Lyra
2001	Mode Plagal III	Mode Plagal	Lyra
2001	Terra nostra	Savina Yannatou & Primavera en Salonico; Live Recording	Lyra; ECM
2001	Εδώ Λιλιπούπολη. Ζωντανή ηχογράφηση σπό το μουσικό θέατρο Βόλου	Various artists Live Recording	Lyra
2001	Έλληνες συνθέτες. Τραυλός, Λαπιδάκης, Παπαδάτος, Τενίδης	Plucked String Orchestra of Patras	Κίνησις
2001	Garden secrets Τα μυστικά του κήπου	Nikos Kypourgos	Σείριος – Minos EMI
2002	Lilly's story (O.S.T.)	Nikos Mamangakis	Universal
2002	Μια φορά κι έναν καιρό... Παραμύθια και διηγήματα απ' την Ελλάδα και τον κόσμο	Various artists Compilation	Δίφωνο
2002	Savina Yannatou sings Manos Hadjidakis; Πάω να πω στο σύννεφο Η Σαβίνα Γιαννάτου σε τραγούδια του Μάνου Χατζηδάκι	Savina Yannatou	Lyra
2003	Asate	Andreas Georgiou	Libra Music
2003	Your golden boat Tvá zlatá loďka	Irena Havlová & Vojtěch Havel; Live Recording	Indies Records
2003	Ένα γράμμα στον πατέρα μου	Various artists Compilation	Lyra
2003	Μπλέ; Σε ποίηση Ρηνιώς Παπανικόλα	Michalis Gregoriou; Live Recording	Legend
2003	Σας τα 'παν άλλοι; Κάλαντα δωδεκαημέρου	Various artists Compilation	Μελωδικό Καράβι
2004	Garden theater Κηποθέατρο	Nikos Kypourgos; Live Recording	Σείριος – Minos EMI
2005	Electra	Arild Andersen	ECM
2005	Levantina	Vojislav Ivanović	Εμσε
2005	Sumiglia	Savina Yannatou & Primavera en Salonico	ECM
2006	En concert	Miquel Gil; Live Recording	Galileo
2006	Heimat (O.S.T.); 58 music pieces from Edgar Reitz films Heimat I, II, III	Nikos Mamangakis	Ιδαία
2006	Tutti baci	Savina Yannatou & Primavera en Salonico; Elena Ledda & Mauro Palmas	Lyra
2006	Άσμα ασμάτων. Ιερά τραγούδια του έρωτα	Nikos Mamangakis	Ιδαία
2006	Η μπαλάντα του Ερωτόκριτου	Nikos Mamangakis	Ιδαία
2006	Μέγα ορατόριο των Ελλήνων. Στρατηγού Μακρυγιάννη	Nikos Mamangakis	Ιδαία
2007	Far West – Tribal dances	Sotiris Debonos	HitchHyke
2007	Musique des chambres Μουσική δωματίων	Savina Yannatou	Lyra
2008	Songs of an other	Savina Yannatou & Primavera en Salonico	ECM
2008	Τραγούδια του Αιγαίου	Orchestra of Colours	Λέσχη Του Δίσκου
2008	Πάντως ήταν νύχτα – La poupée	Stella Gadedi	Lyra
2009	Birthdays	Felizol	Puzzlemusik
2009	Οι άλλοι	Michalis Siganidis; Live Recording	Lyra
2009	Σώμα	Soma	Polytropon
2010	Ερωτόκριτος. Όπερα σε πέντε μέρη	Nikos Mamangakis	Ιδαία
2010	Η όπερα των σκιών	Nikos Mamangakis	Ιδαία
2010	Attikos	Savina Yannatou & Barry Guy; Live Recording	Maya Recordings
2010	Ερωφίλη	Nikos Mamangakis	Ιδαία
2010	Η συναυλία στο Παλλάς	Lena Platonos; Live Recording	Lyra
2010	Ερωτόκριτος. Η εκδοχή της Σητείας	Nikos Mamangakis	Ιδαία
2010	Το τραγούδι του Μπελογιάννη και της Έλλης Παππά	Nikos Mamangakis	Ιδαία
2011	Ομήρου Οδύσσεια	Nektarios Karantzis	Lyra
2011	Εγκώμιο στον Αλέξανδρο Παπαδιαμάντη	Nikos Mamangakis	Ιδαία
2011	Η Οδύσσεια του Νίκου Καζαντζάκη	Nikos Mamangakis	Ιδαία
2015	Songs of Thessaloniki	Savina Yannatou & Primavera en Salonico	ECM
2020	Ways Of Notseeing	Savina Yannatou & Joana Sá	Clean Feed
2025	Watersong	Savina Yannatou & Primavera en Salonico & Lamia Bedioui	ECM

== Compositions for performances ==
=== Theatre ===
Year	Play	Director	Commission
1997	Medea	Nikaiti Kontouri	National Theatre of Greece
2005	The Bacchae	Sotiris Hatzakis	National Theatre of Greece
2006	The Dybbuk; Between Two Worlds	Sotiris Hatzakis	National Theatre of Greece
2007	Iphigenia in Aulis	Sotiris Hatzakis	Thessalian Theatre
2007	Η Γυναίκα της Ζάκυθος	Sotiris Hatzakis	Ymittos Festival
2008	The Caucasian Chalk Circle	Sotiris Hatzakis	National Theatre of Northern Greece

=== Dance theatre ===
Year	Play	Director	Commission
1993	Medea of Silence	Aspasia Kralli	Theatre of Silence
1995	Hades in a Room; Orpheus and Eurydice	Aspasia Kralli	Theatre of Silence
