= Le luci della centrale elettrica =

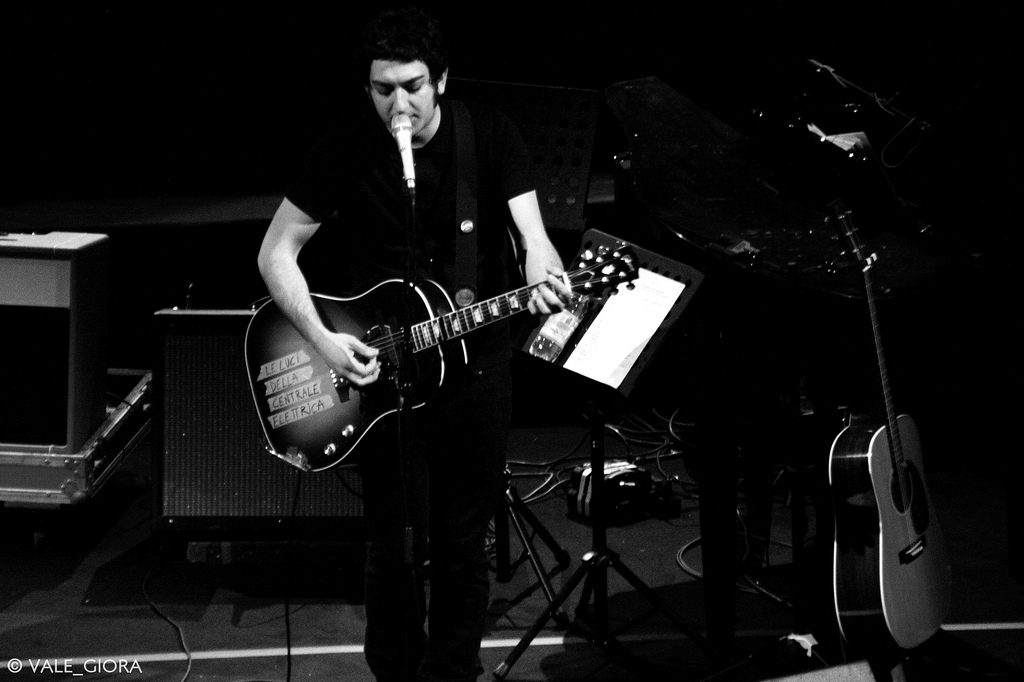
- Vasco Brondi performing as Le luci della centrale elettrica in 2010

Background information
- Origin: Ferrara, Italy
- Genres: indie rock
- Years active: 2007–2018
- Labels: La Tempesta Dischi; Cara Catastrofe
- Past members: Vasco Brondi

Le luci della centrale elettrica was the solo project of Italian singer-songwriter Vasco Brondi, created in 2007. After releasing the albums Canzoni da spiaggia deturpata (2008), Per ora noi la chiameremo felicità (2010), Costellazioni (2014) and Terra (2017), Brondi announced the project's disbandment in 2018, with the release of a compilation album followed by a farewall tour, which ended in Pesaro on 16 January 2019.

Writing for Rolling Stone Italia in 2019, Mattia Barro credited Le luci della centrale elettrica and the album Canzoni da spiaggia deturpata as a turning point in Italian alternative music, which brought indie to become "the new Italian pop music". Canzoni da spiaggia deturpata received the 2008 Targa Tenco for Best Debut Album. Le luci della centrale elettrica also collected three top ten records on the FIMI Italian Albums chart.
