= Verità supposte =

Studio album by Caparezza
- Released: June 13, 2003
- Label: Extra Labels

Caparezza chronology
?! (2000)	Verità supposte (2003)	Habemus Capa (2006)

Singles from Verità supposte
- 1. "Follie preferenziali" Released: 2003; 2. "Il secondo secondo me" Released: 2003; 3. "Fuori dal tunnel (del divertimento)" Released: 2004; 4. "Vengo dalla Luna" Released: 2004; 5. "Giuda me" Released: 2004; 6. "Jodellavitanonhocapitouncazzo" Released: 2004

Verità supposte (translatable as "Presumed Truths", with a subtle pun about "Supposta" also meaning Suppository) is the second studio album by the Italian rapper Caparezza, released on June 13, 2003.

The album got a remarkable success mainly because of the third single Fuori dal tunnel, that allowed the album to remain in the leaderboard for thirty weeks, selling about 130,000 copies in Italy. Verità supposte is present in the leaderboard of the 100 greatest Italian albums of all time according to Rolling Stone Italy in 28th place.

== Track listing ==
All tracks are written by Michele Salvemini.

No.	Title	Writer(s)	Lead vocals	Length
1.	"Il secondo secondo me"	Salvemini	Salvemini	4:14
2.	"Nessuna Razza"	Salvemini	Salvemini	4:09
3.	"La Legge dell'ortica"	Salvemini	Salvemini	3:50
4.	"Stango e Sbronzo"	Salvemini	Salvemini	3.47
5.	"Limiti"	Salvemini	Salvemini	4:37
6.	"Vengo dalla luna"	Salvemini	Salvemini	4:14
7.	"Dagli all'untore"	Salvemini	Salvemini	3.57
8.	"Fuori dal Tunnel"	Salvemini	Salvemini	5:10
9.	"Giuda me"	Salvemini	Salvemini	3:28
10.	"Nel paese dei balordi"	Salvemini	Salvemini	3:52
11.	"L'età dei figuranti"	Salvemini	Salvemini	3:52
12.	"Follie Preferenziali"	Salvemini	Salvemini	4:12
13.	"Dualismi"	Salvemini	Salvemini	3:51
14.	"Jodellavitanonhocapitouncazzo"	Salvemini	Salvemini	4:10
15.	"La sindrome di Lorena" (hidden track)	Salvemini	Salvemini	3:45
Total length:				57:30

== Certifications ==
Region	Certification	Certified units/sales
Italy (FIMI)	Gold	25,000^{*}
^{*} Sales figures based on certification alone.
