= Le dimensioni del mio caos =

Studio album by Caparezza
- Released: April 11, 2008
- Recorded: Transeuropa Recording Studio
- Label: EMI
- Producer: Carlo Ubaldo Rossi

Caparezza chronology
Habemus Capa (2006)	Le dimensioni del mio caos (2008)	Il sogno eretico (2011)

Singles from Le dimensioni del mio caos
- 1. "Eroe (storia di Luigi delle Bicocche)" Released: March 28, 2008; 2. "Vieni a ballare in Puglia" Released: July 2008; 3. "Abiura di me" Released: 2008; 4. "Io diventerò qualcuno" Released: 2009; 5. "Cacca nello spazio" Released: June 29, 2009

Le dimensioni del mio caos (translatable as "The Size of My Chaos") is the fourth album by the Italian rapper Caparezza, released on April 11, 2008.

== Concept and storyline ==
CapaRezza defines this concept as a "picture story sound". The characters of the story are as described in the CD booklet:

- Caparezza, an artist from Apulia who does not smoke joints;
- Ilaria, a hippie transported from the year 1968 who is in love with Jimi Hendrix;
- Luigi delle Bicocche, an adventurous construction worker who demolishes the wall of time;
- A bonobo, a playful and uninhibited monkey.

Ilaria, due to a worm-hole in time, finds herself catapulted from 1968 into the present. The story continues with the love of Caparezza. Ilaria against that, conditioned by our society, refuses to go back to becoming a young hippie girl who follows all the fashions and trends of the moment. She loses her revolutionary spirit, and this ends with her marrying the politician Carneade, the "one man forehead." Carneade aims to build a space port, a great work but absolutely useless, as it is said to be intended to send sewage sludge into space, but in fact its real purpose is to win elections at the front. Meanwhile, Caparezza meets the working man Luigi delle Bicocche, defined modern hero of the precariousness that would work as its subject. Judged by the revolutionary leadership of course, Caparezza is arrested and is sentenced to hard labor in a "circus of mice". Meanwhile, Carneades has won the election with 100 per cent of the vote, while Luigi delle Bicocche creates a second passage in time that takes the world back to prehistoric times. There, a species of ape, the "bonobo", proves to have reached an evolutionary stage more advanced than people today. Some insights are based on the science fiction plot of 2001 A Space Odyssey.

=== La rivoluzione del sessintutto - "The Sex-in-everything Revolution" ===
Caparezza recalls the 1968 Italian shows of Jimi Hendrix and makes a comparison between the warm autumn revolution and sexual liberation that results in sexual phobia today, that justifies the pun title (as "Sixtyeight" in Italian is "Sessantotto", "Sex in everything" in Italian is "Sesso in tutto"). He also cites the groupie Cynthia Plaster Caster, who has become famous for having made some casts of the genitals of Hendrix and other artists. At the end of the track, emulating Hendrix performing the act of splitting the guitar on the banks of amplifiers, with this narrative pretext, he creates a path through space-time with the electric current generated, and meets Ilaria.

=== Ulisse (You Listen) ===
The meeting between Caparezza and Ilaria and is compared to that between Ulysses and the sirens. Here the call of sirens refers to the ability to listen to their inner voice, from here the similarity between the English pronunciation of Ulysses and iullisses with "you listen." The song speaks about the singer's addiction to Ilaria's character.

=== Non mettere le mani in tasca - "Don't Put Your Hands in Your Pockets" ===
Caparezza is arrested for having pockets, a symbol of historical memory, from where the voice of the power that lies and manipulates. Clear reference to the Catholic Church, accused of obscurantism.

=== Pimpami la storia - "Pimp My History" ===
Here speaks a lazy student who looks at facts and historical characters with a gaze that tends to caricature and the climax makes the game of power that wants to promote ignorance among the younger generations.

=== Ilaria condizionata ===
Caparezza describes Ilaria, and plays it on two-way air conditioning (in fact, in Italian "Aria condizionata" is "Air conditioning"), and because it was conditioned by today's society, and because Ilaria – like air – has cooled him, disappointed by the girl he was infatuated.

=== La grande opera - "The Great Work" ===
Talks the Apulian spaceport's ideology. The "Space-port" is an impressive space opera created especially for propaganda purposes. Caparezza refers to the Salerno-Reggio Calabria, the Strait of Messina Bridge, Italian construction and Punta Perotti, works that have never been completed.

=== Vieni a ballare in Puglia - "Come Dance in Apulia" ===
Dancing is about to die, denouncing the scourge of workplace fatalities and other problems in his region, performing an act of love for his land. The song, as previously Fuori dal tunnel, was wrongly interpreted, given that many people considered the track as a praise to the singer's region.

=== Abiura di me - "Abjuration of Myself" ===
Inspired by the world of video games, Caparezza declares his firm intention to always want to "jump to the next level" as a man and as an artist, even at the cost of denying in the future what was yesterday (as well as he already done with his previous character, Mikimix).

=== Cacca nello spazio - "Poop in space" ===
While Caparezza is shoveling excrements (as sentenced by a judge) at the circus, trips for the spaceport are opening, with a plethora of jet setters who are on the show: he seems to want to warn any extraterrestrial by the arrival of these individuals, identified him as the true excrements of the Earth.

=== Il circo delle pantegane - "Circus of Rats" ===
Description symbolic of circus populated by large rats, where the singer's life sadly goes on.

=== Un vero uomo dovrebbe lavare i piatti - "A Real Man Should Wash Dishes" ===
On a thrash metal tune, Caparezza goes against the current of most reactionary stereotypes about ideal man's identikit.

=== Io diventerò qualcuno - "I'll Become Somebody" ===
Imitating a child's voice and the melodies of the Zecchino d'Oro, a popular Italian TV programme where children sing, this song contains an initial quote on the policy agenda of the Matter man's Front by Guglielmo Giannini in the immediate postwar period. Inspired by indifference, Caparezza identifies the somebody of One man's Party, based on opposing values such as ignorance, ego and exhibitionism.

=== Eroe (storia di Luigi delle Bicocche) - "Hero (the Story of Luigi delle Bicocche)" ===
To the tune of A Fistful of Dollars we listen to social protest of the hero-worker, forced to work for freedom and in extremely precarious conditions that to bring home the salary has to bear the fatigue and the constant change of job.

=== Bonobo Power ===
Ending with the monkey bonobo, free from all sorts of conventions, including those of type religious, sexual and ethnic, and so the "modern man's evolution", with modesty to act like a monkey.

== Reception ==
Professional ratings
Review scores
Source	Rating
AllMusic	3.5/5 stars

AllMusic's Mariano Prunes called the album "ambitious but definitely overreaching", writing "its length and unyielding energy can get grating as it goes along [...] the album suffers musically from an unrelenting storm of same-sounding rap and heavy metal."

== Track listing ==
No.	Title	Length
1.	"La rivoluzione del sessintutto"	4:59
2.	"Ulisse (You Listen)"	4:00
3.	"Non mettere le mani in tasca"	4:32
4.	"Pimpami la storia"	4:13
5.	"Ilaria condizionata"	3:43
6.	"La grande opera"	4:50
7.	"Vieni a ballare in Puglia"	3:59
8.	"Abiura di me"	4:10
9.	"Cacca nello spazio"	4:26
10.	"Il circo delle pantegane"	3:47
11.	"Un vero uomo dovrebbe lavare i piatti"	3:56
12.	"Io diventerò qualcuno"	3:37
13.	"Eroe (storia di Luigi delle Bicocche)"	4:06
14.	"Bonobo Power"	3:19
Total length:		59:04

== Certifications ==
Region	Certification	Certified units/sales
Italy (FIMI)	Platinum	50,000^{‡}
^{‡} Sales+streaming figures based on certification alone.
