= Mea Culpa (disambiguation) =

Mea culpa is Latin for "my fault".

Mea culpa may also refer to:

== Literature ==
- Mea Culpa, 1997 novel by Anne Holt

== Film ==
- Mea Maxima Culpa: Silence in the House of God, a 2012 documentary film
- Mea Culpa (2014 film), a French thriller film
- Mea Culpa (2024 film), an American legal thriller film

== TV ==
- Mea Culpa (Chilean TV series), a Spanish-language TV series broadcast by Televisión Nacional de Chile
- "Mea Culpa" (CSI), an episode of the TV series CSI: Crime Scene Investigation
- "Mea Culpa", an episode from season 1 of the TV series Alias
- "Mea Culpa", an episode of Ultraviolet
- "Mea Culpa", an episode of TV series Californication
- "Mea Culpa", an episode of season 5 of Suits
- Sino ang Maysala?: Mea Culpa (Who Is the Culprit? – My Fault), a Philippine television series broadcast by ABS-CBN

== Albums ==
- Mea Culpa, by Umbra et Imago
- Mea Culpa (album), by After Forever, which also contains the song "Mea Culpa"
- Mea Culpa, 2013 album by Clementino

== Songs ==
- "Mea Culpa" and "Mea Culpa (Part II)", by Enigma from the 1990 album MCMXC a.D.
- "Mea Culpa", by Brian Eno and David Byrne from their 1981 album My Life in the Bush of Ghosts
- "Mea Culpa", by Mike + The Mechanics from their 1995 album Beggar on a Beach of Gold
- "Mea Culpa", by After Forever from their 2000 album Prison of Desire
- "Mea Culpa", by Caparezza from his 2000 album ?!
- "Mea Culpa", by The Human Abstract from their 2006 album Nocturne
- "Mea Culpa", by Souf from his 2016 album Alchimie
- "Mea Culpa (Ah! Ça ira!)", by Gojira, first performed in 2024 Olympic Opening Ceremony

== Gaming ==
- Mea Culpa, a fictional weapon in Blasphemous
- Mea Culpa, a downloadable content (DLC) expansion released in 2024 for Blasphemous 2
