= La Crus =

Italian rock music group

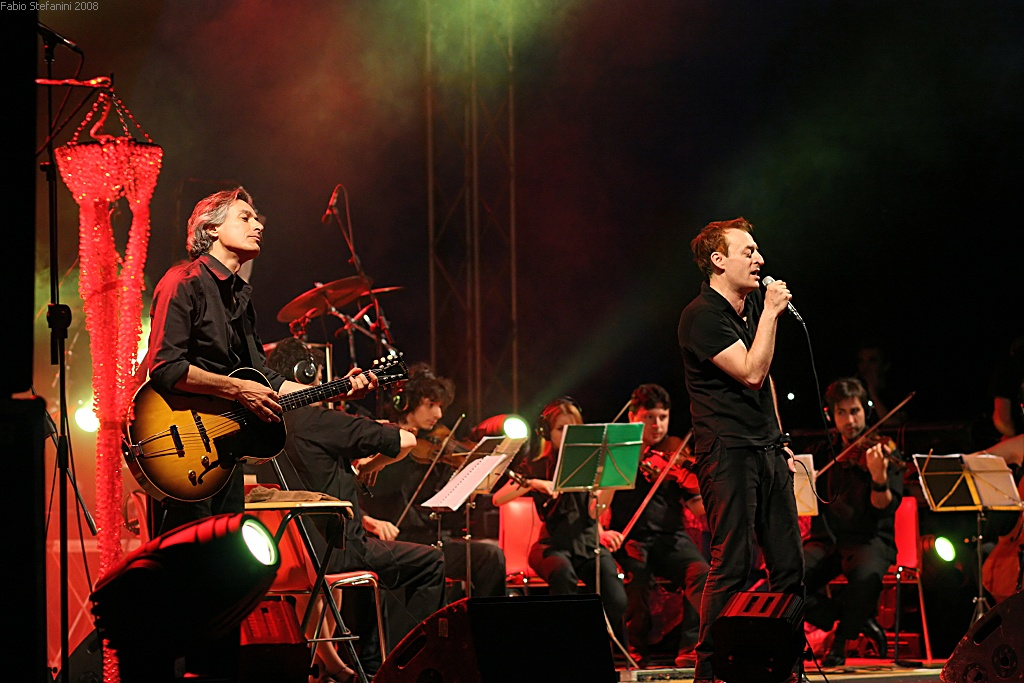
- La Crus in 2008

Background information
- Origin: Milan, Italy
- Genres: Rock; Blues
- Years active: 1993–2008; 2011; 2023–present
- Members: Mauro Ermanno Giovanardi; Cesare Malfatti; Alessandro Cremonesi

La Crus is an Italian musical group formed in Milan in 1993.

== Career ==
The band formed in Milan as a side project for The Carnival of Fools lead vocalist Mauro Ermanno Giovanardi. He joined forces with guitarist Cesare Malfatti and lyricist Alessandro Cremonesi. After contributing to the collective album Vox Pop 93 and I disertori (An Ivano Fossati tribute album), La Crus released their eponymous first album in 1995. It was awarded the Targa Tenco for best debut album. They went on to win a second Targa Tenco as best performers in 2001 for their cover album Crocevia. The group split in 2008, following the release of their maiden live album "Io non credevo che questa sera. Following a brief reunion in 2011 to enter the Sanremo Music Festival with the song "Io confesso", the band officially reunited in 2023 and released a new version of "Io confesso" in a duet with Carmen Consoli. A new album, Proteggimi da ciò che voglio, was released on March 22, 2024.

== Discography ==
Studio albums

- 1995 - La Crus
- 1997 - Dentro me
- 1999 - Dietro la curva del cuore
- 2001 - Crocevia
- 2003 - Ogni cosa che vedo
- 2005 - Infinite possibilità
- 2024 - Proteggimi da ciò che voglio

Live albums

- 2008 - Io non credevo che questa sera

Compilation albums

- 1996 - Remix
- 2006 - Tutto La Crus

== Members ==
- Mauro Ermanno Giovanardi - vocals
- Cesare Malfatti - guitar
- Alessandro Cremonesi - lyrics
