= Habemus Capa =

Studio album by Caparezza
- Released: March 24, 2006
- Label: EMI

Caparezza chronology
Verità supposte (2003)	Habemus Capa (2006)	Le dimensioni del mio caos (2008)

Singles from Habemus Capa
- 1. "La mia parte intollerante" Released: 2006; 2. "Torna Catalessi" Released: 2006; 3. "Dalla parte del toro" Released: 2006; 4. "The Auditels Family" Released: 2006

Habemus Capa is the third studio album by the Italian rapper Caparezza, released on March 24, 2006. The album title and the final track of the same name are a play on the traditional Latin phrase "Habemus Papa" (more properly Habemus Papam) used to announce the selection of a new Pope.

The idea for the album comes from the idea that Caparezza hypothetically dies, like in the last track of the previous album, but, as he "dies" while he is still alive, he can gain from the success of the album.

== Track listing ==
1. "Mors mea tacci tua" – 0:26
2. "Annunciatemi al pubblico" – 4:07
3. "Torna Catalessi" – 3:57
4. "Gli insetti del podere" – 3:58
5. "Dalla parte del toro" – 3:58
6. "Ninna nanna di Mazzarò" – 4:41
7. "Il silenzio dei colpevoli" – 4:08
8. "Profilo psichico" – 0:35
9. "La mia parte intollerante" – 4:22
10. "Inno verdano" – 3:49
11. "Epocalisse" – 3:54
12. "Tii-yan" – 0:24
13. "The Auditels Family" – 4:07
14. "Ti giri" – 3:41
15. "Titoli" – 3:55
16. "Felici ma trimoni" – 4:53
17. "Sssaasss" – 0:22
18. "Sono troppo stitico" – 3:58
19. "Habemus Capa" – 4:24

== Certifications ==
Region	Certification	Certified units/sales
Italy (FIMI)	Gold	25,000^{‡}
^{‡} Sales+streaming figures based on certification alone.
