= Prisoner 709 =

Studio album by Caparezza
- Released: September 15, 2017
- Genres: Rap rock Alternative hip-hop
- Length: 70:25
- Label: Universal Music
- Producer: Caparezza

Caparezza chronology
Museica (2014)	Prisoner 709 (2017)	Exuvia (2021)

Singles from Prisoner 709
- 1. "Prisoner 709" Released: September 7, 2017; 2. "Ti fa stare bene" Released: September 15, 2017; 3. "Una chiave" Released: January 12, 2018; 4. "Larsen" Released: May 21, 2018; 5. "Confusianesimo" Released: September 7, 2018

Prisoner 709 is the seventh studio album by the Italian rapper Caparezza, released on September 15, 2017 by Universal Music Group.

== Conception ==
Recorded between Molfetta and Los Angeles together with Chris Lord-Alge, it is a concept album composed of sixteen tracks, some of which were recorded in collaboration with John De Leo, DMC and Max Gazzè.

The album is the result of a profound internal crisis for the rapper and focuses on the theme of being trapped within one's own mental dimension (or prison, as the artist himself stated). Compared to his previous album Museica, released three years earlier, Prisoner 709 features sounds much closer to hip hop and rock and more intimate and reflective themes. The album also features numerous references to tinnitus, a disorder that struck the singer in 2015 and which significantly influenced his making of the album.

== Title ==
During the album presentation, which took place on September 14, 2017 at the Fabbrica Orobia in Milan, the rapper clarified the meaning of the number 709, which represents a sort of identity crisis that the singer had in previous years. The number 7 represents his name Michele, composed of seven letters, while the number 9 represents his stage name Caparezza, composed of nine. During the same event he also declared that for each song he enjoyed finding contrasts between words of seven and nine letters, in order to emphasize the introspective meaning of the album. The number 0, on the other hand, represents the continuous choice between 7 and 9, and is also a reference to the circular shape of a musical record.

== Track listing ==
1. "Prosopagnosia" (The crime - Michele or Caparezza) (feat. John De Leo)
2. "Prisoner 709" (The penalty - Compact or streaming)
3. "La caduta di Atlante" (The Weight - Abuse or justice)
4. "Forever Jung" (The psychologist - To heal or to get sick) (feat. DMC)
5. "Confusianesimo" (Comfort - Reason or religion)
6. "Il testo che avrei voluto scrivere" (The Letter - Novel or biography)
7. "Una chiave" (The Interview - Opening or closing)
8. "Ti fa stare bene" (Rec time - Frivolous or busy)
9. "Migliora la tua memoria con un click" (The Flashback - Remember or forget) (feat. Max Gazzè)
10. "Larsen" (Torture - Forgiveness or punishment)
11. "Sogno di potere" (The Revolt - To Serve or to command)
12. "L'uomo che premette" (The Guard - Harmless or criminal)
13. "Minimoog" (The Infirmary - Scratch or scar) (feat. John De Leo)
14. "L'infinto" (The Window - People or programs)
15. "Autoipnotica" (Escape - Flee or Return)
16. "Prosopagno sia!" (On the run - Freedom or imprisonment)

=== Bonus tracks ===
1. "Prosopagno sia!" (On the run - Freedom or imprisonment) (Hidden Version)

== Commercial performance ==
=== Weekly charts ===
Chart (2017–2018)	Peak position
Italian Albums (FIMI)	1
Swiss Albums (Schweizer Hitparade)	41

=== Year-end charts ===
Chart (2017)	Peak position
Italian Albums (FIMI)	13

== Certifications ==
Region	Certification	Certified units/sales
Italy (FIMI)	2× Platinum	140,000^{‡}
^{‡} Sales+streaming figures based on certification alone.
