= Il sogno eretico =

Studio album by Caparezza
- Released: March 1, 2011
- Length: 64:19
- Label: Universal Music

Caparezza chronology
Le dimensioni del mio caos (2008)	Il sogno eretico (2011)	Museica (2014)

Singles from Il sogno eretico
- 1. "Goodbye Malinconia" Released: January 28, 2011; 2. "Chi se ne frega della musica" Released: April 29, 2011; 3. "Legalize the Premier" Released: July 26, 2011; 4. "La fine di Gaia" Released: October 21, 2011; 5. "Kevin Spacey" Released: January 27, 2012

Il sogno eretico (Italian pronunciation: [il ˈsoɲɲo eˈrɛːtiko]; "The Heretical Dream") is the fifth studio album by the Italian rapper Caparezza, released on March 1, 2011. The title is a pun on the term sogno erotico ("erotic dream").

The album debuted at the second place on the official Italian charts, FIMI.

== Reception ==
Professional ratings
Review scores
Source	Rating
Allmusic	(favorable)

Allmusic reviewer Mariano Prunes wrote, "CapaRezza continues to defy classification with his fascinating cross-contamination of styles".

== Track listing ==
1. "Nessun dorma"
2. "Tutti dormano"
3. "Chi se ne frega della musica"
4. "Il dito medio di Galileo"
5. "Sono il tuo sogno eretico"
6. "Cose che non capisco"
7. "Goodbye Malinconia" (feat. Tony Hadley)
8. "La marchetta di Popolino"
9. "La fine di Gaia"
10. "House Credibility"
11. "Kevin Spacey"
12. "Legalize the Premier" (feat. Alborosie)
13. "Messa in moto"
14. "Non siete Stato voi"
15. "La ghigliottina"
16. "Ti sorrido mentre affogo"

== Certifications ==
Region	Certification	Certified units/sales
Italy (FIMI)	Platinum	60,000^{*}
^{*} Sales figures based on certification alone.

== Bonus tracks ==
1. "Lottavo, capitolo"
2. "Ti sorrido mentre affogo (video)"
