= Max Manfredi =

Italian singer-songwriter (born 1956)

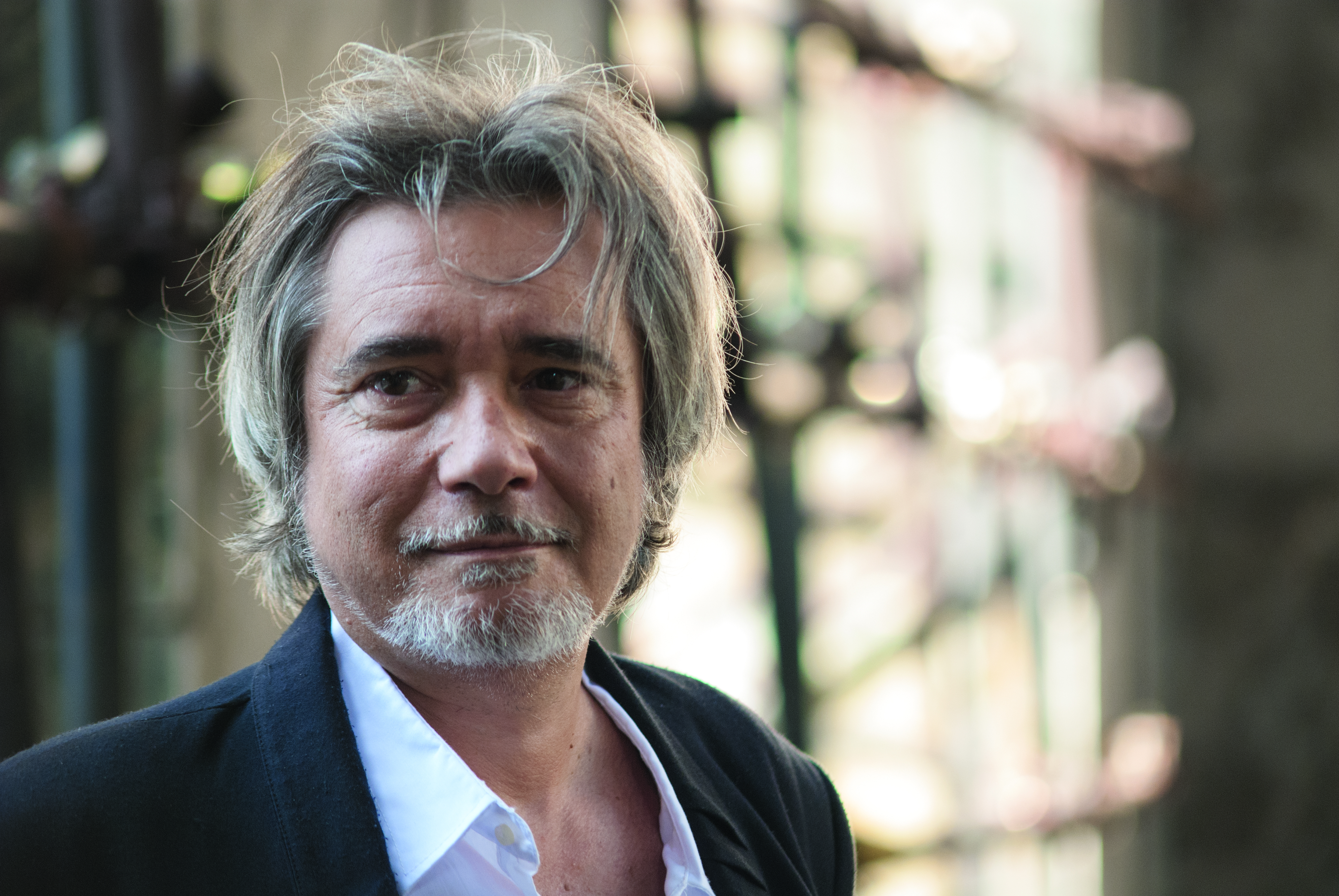
- Manfredi in 2014
- Born: 7 December 1956 (age 69); Genoa, Italy
- Occupation: Singer-songwriter

Massimo "Max" Manfredi (born 7 December 1956) is an Italian singer-songwriter and writer.

== Life and career ==
Manfredi made his recording debut in 1990, with the album Le parole del gatto, which won the Targa Tenco for best debut album. In 1994, he released his second album, Max, which included "La fiera della Maddalena", a duet with Fabrizio De André. The same year he released his first book, Libro de Limerick. In 2009, he won the Targa Tenco for Best Album of the Year with Luna Persa.

Manfredi is also a member of the ensamble Accademia Viscontea I Musicanti, specialized in Medieval, Renaissance and Baroque music, and of the folk group La Rionda. In 2026, he received the Premio Tenco for his career.

== Discography ==
- 1990 - Le parole del gatto
- 1994 - Max
- 2001 - L'intagliatore di santi
- 2004 - Live in blu
- 2008 - Luna persa
- 2014 - Dremong
- 2021 - Il grido della fata
