= Tredici canzoni urgenti =

Studio album by Vinicio Capossela
- Released: 21 April 2023
- Label: La Cùpa

Vinicio Capossela chronology
Ballate per uomini e bestie (2019)	Tredici canzoni urgenti (2023)	Sciusten feste n.1965 (2024)

Tredici canzoni urgenti (lit. 'Thirteen urgent songs') is the twelfth studio album by Italian singer-songwriter Vinicio Capossela. Anticipated by the single "La crociata dei bambini", it was released on 21 April 2023. The album was awarded the Targa Tenco for best album of the year.

== Track listing ==
All tracks are written by Vinicio Capossela.

No.	Title	Length
1.	"Il bene rifugio"	4:22
2.	"All You Can Eat"	3:48
3.	"La parte del torto"	5:14
4.	"Staffette in bicicletta" (featuring Mara Redeghieri)	4:35
5.	"Sul divano occidentale" (featuring Bunna, Sir Oliver Skardy, Raiz)	4:09
6.	"Gloria all'archibugio"	4:10
7.	"Ariosto governatore"	4:08
8.	"La crociata dei bambini"	5:48
9.	"La cattiva educazione" (featuring Margherita Vicario)	3:49
10.	"Minorità"	5:06
11.	"Cha cha chaf della pozzanghera"	4:05
12.	"Il tempo dei regali"	5:29
13.	"Con i tasti che ci abbiamo"	4:07

== Reception ==
Billboard Italia ranked the album as the eleventh best Italian album of the year, while Internazionale ranked it third.

== Charts ==
Weekly chart performance for Tredici canzoni urgenti
Chart (2025)	Peak position
Italiam Albums (FIMI)	5
