= Orbit Orbit =

Studio album by Caparezza
- Released: 20 June 2025
- Label: BMG
- Producer: Michele Salvemini

Caparezza chronology
Exuvia (2022)	Orbit Orbit (2025)

Orbit Orbit is the ninth studio album by Italian rapper Caparezza. Anticipated by the single "Io sono il viaggio", it was released on 31 October 2025 by BMG. It was the 2025 best-selling album in physical format in Italy.

== Track listing ==
Orbit Orbit track listing
No.	Title	Writer(s)	Length
1.	"Fluttuo, orbito"	Michele Salvemini	3:26
2.	"Il pianeta delle idee"	Salvemini	4:01
3.	"Io sono il viaggio"	Salvemini	5:33
4.	"Darktar"	Salvemini	4:02
5.	"A Comic Book Saved My Life"	Salvemini, Christian Le Bartz, Gérard L'Her	4:12
6.	"Il banditore"	Enzo Del Re	3:57
7.	"Autovorbit"	Salvemini	4:27
8.	"Curiosity (oltre il bagliore)"	Salvemini	4:58
9.	"Gli occhi della mente"	Salvemini, Franco Migliacci, Claudio Mattone	3:56
10.	"Come la musica elettronica"	Salvemini	4:14
11.	"The NDE"	Salvemini	3:59
12.	"Pathosfera"	Salvemini	4:53
13.	"Cosmonaufrago"	Salvemini	5:00
14.	"Perlificat"	Salvemini	4:38

== Reception ==
Billboard Italia ranked the album as the eighth best Italian album of the year, while Rolling Stone Italia ranked it 21st.

In 2026, the album was awarded the Targa Tenco for best album of the year.

== Charts ==
Weekly chart performance for Orbit Orbit
Chart (2025)	Peak position
Italiam Albums (FIMI)	1
Swiss Albums (Schweizer Hitparade)	63

== Certifications ==
Region	Certification	Certified units/sales
Italy (FIMI)	Platinum	50,000^{‡}
^{‡} Sales+streaming figures based on certification alone.
