= Museica =

Studio album by Caparezza
- Released: April 22, 2014
- Genre: Rap rock
- Length: 70:00
- Label: Universal Music

Caparezza chronology
Il sogno eretico (2011)	Museica (2014)	Prisoner 709 (2017)

Singles from Museica
- 1. "Non me lo posso permettere" Released: March 21, 2014; 2. "È tardi" Released: May 30, 2014; 3. "China Town" Released: August 29, 2014; 4. "Avrai ragione tu (Ritratto)" Released: November 14, 2014; 5. "Mica Van Gogh" Released: February 27, 2015

Museica is the sixth studio album by the Italian rapper Caparezza, released on April 22, 2014.

Published three years after the album Il sogno eretico, it's the first album of the Italian artist that reached the first place in the leaderboard of the most sold albums in Italy.

The song "Avrai ragione tu (ritratto)" was released on November 14, 2014. It is inspired by the picture of Dmitri Vrubel My God, Help Me to Survive This Deadly Love.

== Description ==
The title of the album is created by the words "musica" ("music" in italian, used because it's a musical album), "museo" ("museum" in italian, used because every track is inspired from an artwork) and "sei" ("six" in italian, used because it's the 6th album of the italian rapper). Caparezza himself described Museica with the following words:

«Museica is my museum, my music, my 6th album. It's been recorded in Molfetta and mixed in Los Angeles from the highly acclaimed Charis Lord-Alge. Begin me both the author and the artistic producer, i consider it as a new "first" album. It's an album that is inspired from the world of art, the audioguide of my visions displayed. Every track from Museica is inspired from paintings. It doesn't really exist a track that can't represent the entire album, because there's no painting that can represent the entire gallery. Essentially this album, doesn't have to be heard, but visited.»

The cover of the album it's inspired from a painting of Domenico Dell'Osso, painted just for the artist, with title from the album.

The album travels from art to violence: according to Caparezza «the majority of the things that gives life to this Earth is thanks to violence. To escape from the restlessness of living we try to build a parallel reality, we create the ideal world; the art is salvific»

In October 2014 the album won "album of the year" at Targa Tenco.

== Music and lyrics ==
According to Caparezza, Museica is "more or less rap rock. It’s not a Bob Dylan album."

== Track listing ==
1. "Canzone all'entrata"
2. "Avrai ragione tu (Ritratto)"
3. "Mica Van Gogh"
4. "Non me lo posso permettere"
5. "Figli d'arte"
6. "Comunque dada"
7. "Giotto Beat"
8. "Cover"
9. "China Town"
10. "Canzone a metà"
11. "Teste di Modì"
12. "Argenti vive"
13. "Compro horror"
14. "Kitaro" (Michele Salvemini, Mizuki Shigeru, Taku Izumi)
15. "Troppo politico"
16. "Sfogati"
17. "Fai da tela" (feat. Diego Perrone)
18. "È tardi" (feat. Michael Franti)
19. "Canzone all'uscita"

== Bonus tracks ==
1. "Museica Documentario (Short Version)"

== Commercial performance ==
=== Weekly charts ===
Chart (2014–2015)	Peak position
Italian Albums (FIMI)	1
Swiss Albums (Schweizer Hitparade)	78

=== Year-end charts ===
Chart (2014)	Peak position
Italian Albums (FIMI)	17
Chart (2015)	Peak position
Italian Albums (FIMI)	100

=== Certifications ===
Region	Certification	Certified units/sales
Italy (FIMI)	2× Platinum	100,000^{*}
^{*} Sales figures based on certification alone.
