= Vinicio Capossela =

Italian singer-songwriter

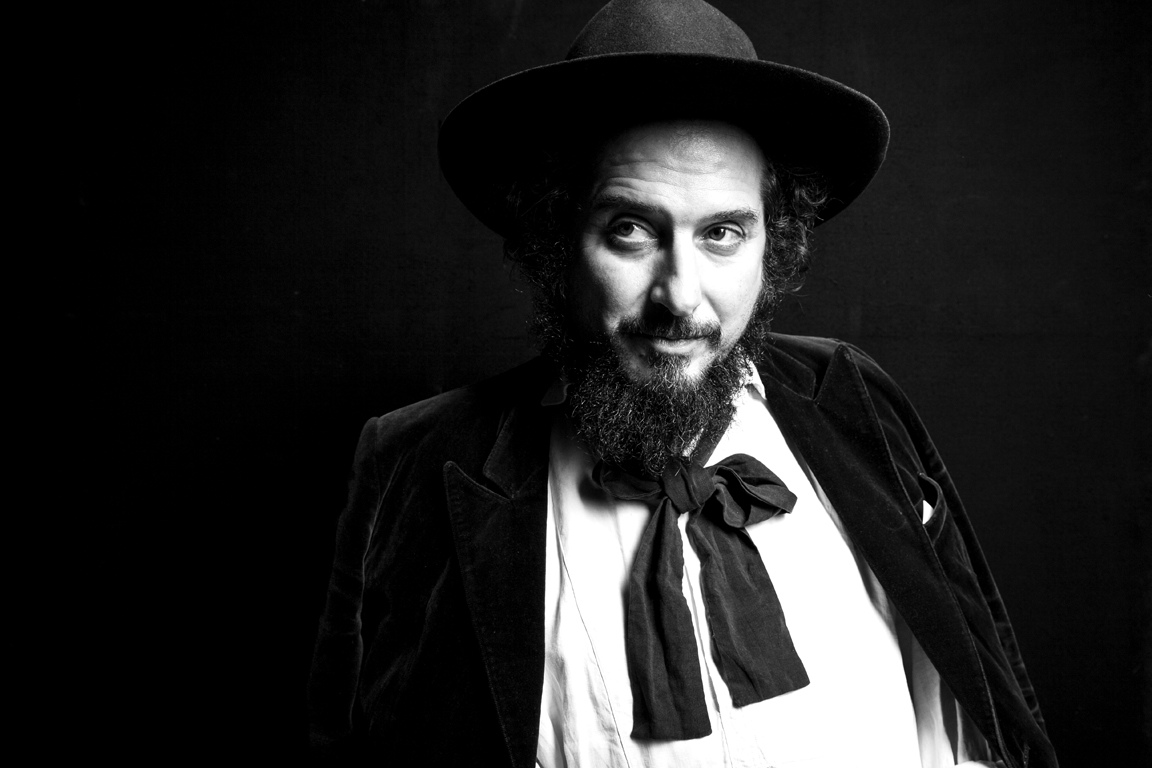
Vinicio Capossela

Vinicio Capossela (born 14 December 1965) is an Italian singer-songwriter, poet and novelist.

Capossela is renowned for the highly original and poetic lyrics of his songs. Many of them draw from traditions of Italian folk music, especially those of his parents' native Irpinia, part of the Campania province.

Some of his songs — especially in the album Marinai, profeti e balene ("Sailors, Prophets and Whales") — are inspired by themes and legends from around the world (Canzone a manovella, Medusa cha cha cha) and from world literature, such as Homer (Calypso, La lancia del pelide), Samuel Taylor Coleridge (Santissima dei naufragati), Joseph Conrad (Lord Jim), Herman Melville (Billy Budd, La Bianchezza della Balena), John Fante (Accolita dei rancorosi), Oscar Wilde (Con una rosa), Alfred Jarry (Decervellamento) and Geoffrey Chaucer (Corvo torvo). His musical style has been compared to that of Tom Waits. He also published translations of original songs by other authors, including Bob Dylan (La nave sta arrivando), Vladimir Vysotsky (Il pugile sentimentale) and Markos Vamvakaris (Contratto per Karelias).

== Biography ==
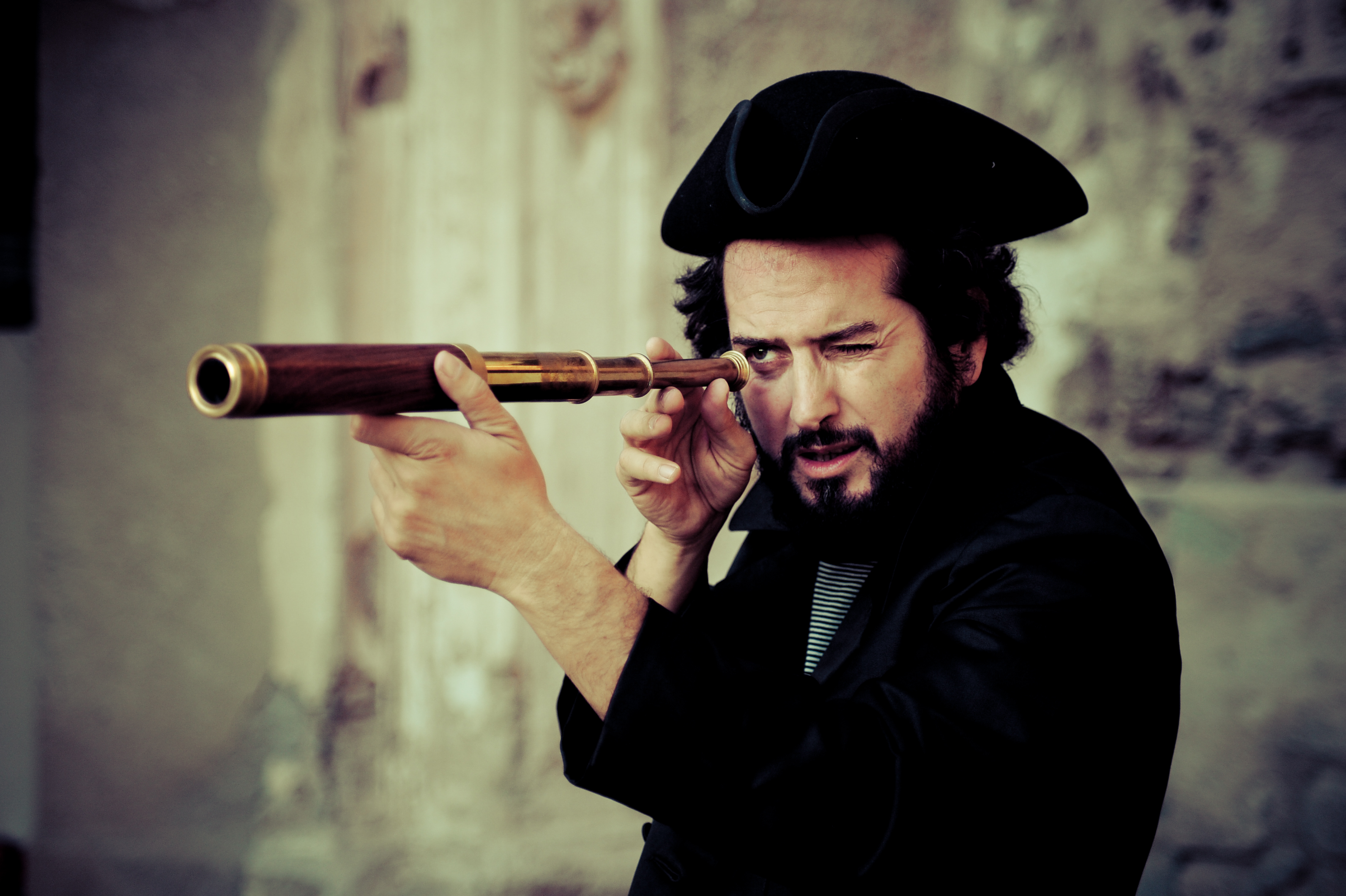
Vinicio Capossela in 2011

Capossela was born in Hannover (Germany) to Italian parents. His father Vito was from Calitri and his mother from Andretta, both towns in the Irpinia region of Campania. The name "Vinicio" was an homage to a famous accordion player whom his father admired.

At an early age he returned to Italy with his family, and they settled in the province of Reggio Emilia. Growing up, Capossela became popular in the underground musical scene of the Emilia-Romagna region. There he attracted the attention of Francesco Guccini, who introduced him to Club Tenco, an organization founded in 1972 to promote emerging songwriters. Capossela published his first album (All'una e trentacinque circa) in 1990. It was followed by Modì (1991) and Camera a Sud (1994). Capossela's big breakthrough came in 1996 with the album Il ballo di San Vito.

That was followed by Capossela's first live album, Liveinvolvo, released in 1998. It was recorded during three live concerts of the Il ballo di San Vito tour. It also features the Macedonian brass band Kocani Orkestar. In 2000 he released Canzoni a manovella, for which he won the Targa Tenco for the best album. Between this record and the following one, Ovunque proteggi (2006), in 2004 he published his first book, Non si muore tutte le mattine.

In 2008 he released Da solo, recorded both in Milan and in the USA. The following year, he published a new live album that features a CD and a DVD, called Solo Show. It was recorded during the unique and spectacular Solo Show, that was inspired by American side shows. The experience behind the making of the record was included in his first film, La faccia della terra, directed by Gianfranco Firriolo and published by Feltrinelli in 2010.

In 2011, he released Marinai, profeti e balene, a 2-CD album that Capossela describes as a “cyclopedic work”. It is focused on Greek mythology and marine literature, with songs inspired by Melville's Moby Dick, Conrad's Lord Jim or Céline's Scandale aux abysses. Marinai, profeti e balene won the Targa Tenco as Best Album.

The following year, he released a new sea-inspired album called Rebetiko Gymnastas, in which he re-recorded some of his older songs, but played in rebetiko style. It was actually recorded in 2007 in Athens' Sierra Studios. In 2013 he published two more works about Greece and the world of rebetiko: the film Indebito, directed by Andrea Segre, and the book Tefteri, published by Il Saggiatore.

During the same year, he produced Banda della Posta's first album, called Primo Ballo. Banda della Posta is a group formed by some old musicians from Calitri, the native town of Capossela's father.

Still in 2013, Capossela became artistic director of a musical and cultural festival called Sponz Fest, that takes place in Calitri (in the Campania area of Irpinia) during the final week of August.

In 2015, he published a new book called Il paese dei Coppoloni (Feltrinelli), followed in 2016 by a DVD named Nel paese dei Coppoloni, in which he shows places and faces that can be found in the book. Also in 2016, he released Canzoni della Cupa, a 2-CD album. In Canzoni della Cupa, the two CDs are subtitled "the Dust side" and "the Shadow side". It features popular songs typical of the area of Calitri or versions of Matteo Salvatore's chants, and some original songs by Capossela.

In 2017 he got the Tenco Prize for his career.

Two years after, in 2019, he released a new record, Ballate per uomini e bestie. In 2020, he released Bestiario d'amore, a four songs EP whose title-track is the translation and adaptation of a poem by the thirteenth-century French troubadour Richard de Fournival.

His most recent book, called Eclissica (Feltrinelli), was published in 2021. It is a retrospective of his career and life since 2006, and it allows the reader to enter and discover the cultural background that led to Capossela's most highly-acclaimed albums.

Also in 2021, he went on a tour called Bestiale Comedìa, which was inspired by Dante's Divine Comedy on the 700th anniversary of his death and that was performed also during Dubai's Expo.

In October, after the end of this tour, he performed four special concerts in Milan's Blue Note club as a way of celebrating his thirty-year career. The concerts, called Personal Standards / Round one thirty five, gave life to a new tour that lasted throughout 2022 and took place both in Italy and abroad. In November 2022, he performed in the Balkan area for his tour called Balkangiro.

On 21st April 2023, he released his latest studio album, called Tredici canzoni urgenti (thirteen urgent songs).

== Private life ==
Capossela always refused to discuss his private life. In 1994 he married an American model but the couple divorced after about two years.

== Discography ==
=== Studio albums ===
- All'una e trentacinque circa (1990)
- Modì (1991)
- Camera a sud (1994)
- Il ballo di San Vito (1996)
- Canzoni a manovella (2000)
- Ovunque proteggi (2006)
- Da solo (2008) – ITA: Platinum (90,000)
- Marinai, profeti e balene (2011)
- Rebetiko Gymnastas (2012)
- Canzoni della cupa (2016)
- Ballate per uomini e bestie (2019)
- Tredici canzoni urgenti (2023)
- Sciusten feste n.1965 (2024)

=== Live albums ===
- Liveinvolvo (1998)
- Nel niente sotto il sole – Grand tour 2006 (2007)
- Solo Show Alive (2009)

=== Collections ===
- L'indispensabile (2003)
- The Story-Faced Man (2010) – English market exclusive

=== EPs ===
- La nave sta arrivando (2011)
- Bestiario d'amore (2020)

== Recognitions ==
- All'una e trentacinque circa – Targa Tenco 1991, Best new act
- Canzoni a manovella – Targa Tenco 2001, Best Album
- Ovunque proteggi – Targa Tenco 2006, Best Album
- Ovunque proteggi – Lunezia Prize 2006
- Fernanda Pivano Prize 2007
- Piero Ciampi Prize 2008
- With the song Lettere di soldati – Italian Amnesty International Prize 2009
- Marinai, profeti e balene – Targa Tenco 2011, Best Album
- De André Career Prize
- Canzoni della Cupa – Lunezia Prize 2017
- Tenco Prize for his career 2017
- Ballate per uomini e bestie – Targa Tenco 2019, Best Album
- Bestiale Comedìa – Rockol Prize, Best Live Act 2021

== Bibliography ==
=== Books by Vinicio Capossela ===
- Vinicio Capossela, Non si muore tutte le mattine, ISBN 88-07-01647-8, Feltrinelli, Milan (2004)
- Vinicio Capossela, Vincenzo Costantino Cinaski, In clandestinità, ISBN 978-88-07-01785-8, Feltrinelli, Milan (2009)
- Vinicio Capossela, Tefteri – Il libro dei conti in sospeso, ISBN 9788842819417, Il Saggiatore, Milan (2013)
- Vinicio Capossela, Eclissica, ISBN 9788807034732, Feltrinelli, Milan (2021)

== Films ==
- La faccia della terra, Feltrinelli, Milan (2010)
- Indebito, JoleFilm (2013)
- Nel paese dei Coppoloni, Feltrinelli, Milan (2016)

=== Books about Vinicio Capossela ===
- Elisabetta Cucco, Vinicio Capossela. Rabdomante senza requie, ISBN 88-86784-31-7, Auditorium, Milan (2005)
- Vincenzo Mollica, Niente canzoni d'amore + DVD Parole e canzoni, ISBN 88-06-18668-X, Einaudi, Turin (2006)
- Massimo Padalino, Il ballo di San Vinicio, ISBN 978-88-6231-083-3, Arcana (2009)
