= Tazenda =

Italian musical group

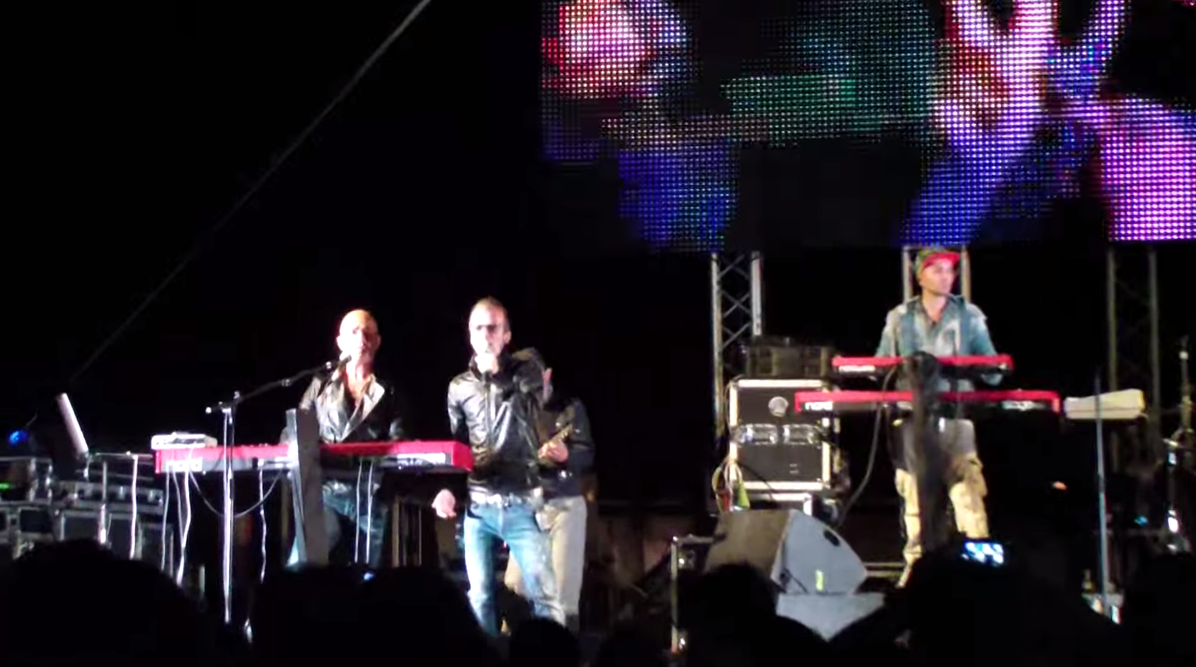
- Tazenda live in Arbus, 2014

Background information
- Origin: Sardinia, Italy
- Genres: Pop rock; ethnic music; folk rock; pop
- Years active: 1988–present
- Members: Gigi Camedda; Gino Marielli; Serena Carta Mantilla
- Past members: Andrea Parodi; Beppe Dettori; Nicola Nite
- Website: tazenda.it

Tazenda is an Italian ethnic pop-rock band from Sardinia. The group was formed in 1988 by Andrea Parodi, Gigi Camedda and Gino Marielli, and its music is characterized by the influence from traditional Sardinian music; the lyrics of most of their songs are in Sardinian language, especially in its Logudorese variety.

== History ==
The name of the band was taken from Second Foundation, a novel of the Foundation series by Isaac Asimov. In the novel the planet "Tazenda" (the name of which comes from the English expression "Star's End") plays an important role. The choice, according to Tazenda, of this name was because of an assonance with their own language.

In 1991, the band gained popularity after the participation at Sanremo Music Festival together with the Sardinian singer-songwriter Pierangelo Bertoli with the song "Spunta la luna dal monte (Disamparados)" ("The moon rises from the mountain [Lost people]"). The song finished fifth, and was won the Tenco Prize in 1991 for the Best Dialectal Song; it was released on their album Murales. In 1991, Tazenda alao participated in the May Day Concert in Rome singing their songs and duetting with the singer and polystrumentist Mauro Pagani on "Davvero davvero".

The band also collaborated with the singer-songwriter Fabrizio De André singing a song in Sardinian ("Etta abba chelu") and co-writing the song "Pitzinnos in sa gherra" ("Children in the War"), both of which were included on their 1992 album Limba.

In 2006, Tazenda performed in the Roman Amphitheatre of Cagliari together with the former member band and singer Andrea Parodi, shortly before his death; the live album of the event was titled "Reunion". The 2007 album Vida ("Life") had a new singer, Beppe Dettori. The first song of the album was a duet with Eros Ramazzotti, "Domo mia" ("My Home"). Ramazzotti sang in Sardinian for the first time.

== Discography ==
=== Studio albums ===
- 1988 - Tazenda
- 1991 - Murales
- 1992 - Limba
- 1995 - Fortza paris
- 1998 - Sardinia
- 2005 - ¡¡¡Bum-ba!!!
- 2007 - Vida
- 2008 - Madre Terra
- 2012 - Ottantotto
- 2021 – Antìstasis

=== Compilation albums ===
- 1997 - Il sole di Tazenda

=== Live albums ===
- 1993 - Il popolo rock
- 2001 - Bios – Live in Ziqqurat
- 2006 - Reunion
- 2009 - Il nostro canto - Live in Sardinia
- 2011 - Desvelos tour
- 2015 - Il respiro live

=== Singles ===
- 1988 – "A sa zente/S'urtima luche"
- 1990 – "Carrasecare"
- 1991 – "Spunta la Luna dal monte (Disamparados)" (feat. Pierangelo Bertoli)
- 1991 – "Mamoiada"
- 1993 – "Il popolo rock"
- 1997 – "Scaldaci Sole"
- 2003 - "Bandidos"
- 2007 - "Domo mia" (feat. Eros Ramazzotti)
- 2007 - "La ricerca di te"
- 2008 - "Madre Terra" (feat. Francesco Renga)
- 2009 - "Piove luce" (feat. Gianluca Grignani)
- 2008 - "L'aquila"
- 2012 - "Mielacrime"
- 2013 - "Il respiro del silenzio" (feat. Kekko Silvestre from Modà)
- 2015 - "Amore nou"
- 2018 - "Dentro le parole"
