= Enzo Avitabile =

Italian saxophonist and singer-songwriter (born 1955)

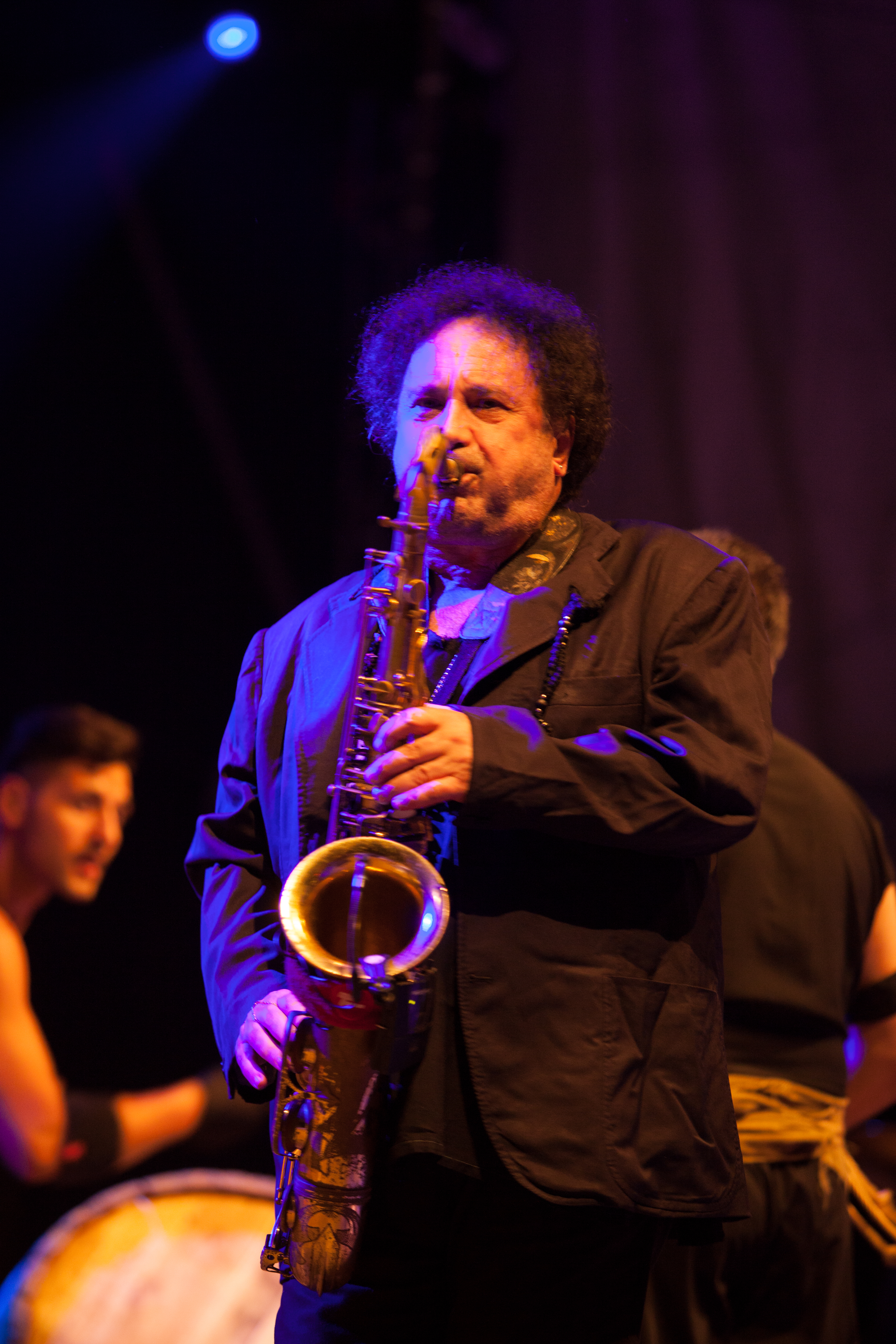
Enzo Avitabile at the Hausacher LeseLenz 2013

Vincenzo "Enzo" Avitabile (Italian pronunciation: [ˈɛntso aviˈtaːbile]; born 1 March 1955) is an Italian saxophonist, composer and singer-songwriter. He plays a fusion of world music and jazz fusion music, rooted in Neapolitan traditions and language.

== Career ==
Born in Naples, Italy, Avitabile started as a self-taught saxophonist at ten years old. He graduated in flute at the Naples Conservatory. He started his career as a turnist, and made his record debut in 1982 with Avitabile, an album which saw the collaboration of Richie Havens.

He tours with his band, going under the name of Enzo Avitabile & Bottari. Bottari is a traditional rhythm from southern Italy involving percussion elements such as wine barrels, wooden drums and the like. Avitabile keeps the Bottari culture in mind while experimenting with fusion jazz (sax, trumpets, etc.).

He has collaborated with Pino Daniele, Edoardo Bennato, James Brown, Afrika Bambaataa and Tina Turner, Trilok Gurtu, Daby Touré, and Ashraf Sharif Khan (son of Sharif Khan Poonchwaley), among others. With his Bottari lineup, he was nominated for the prestigious 'Audience Award' in the 2005 BBC Awards for World Music.

In 2012, he was the subject of Jonathan Demme's docu-movie Enzo Avitabile Music Life.

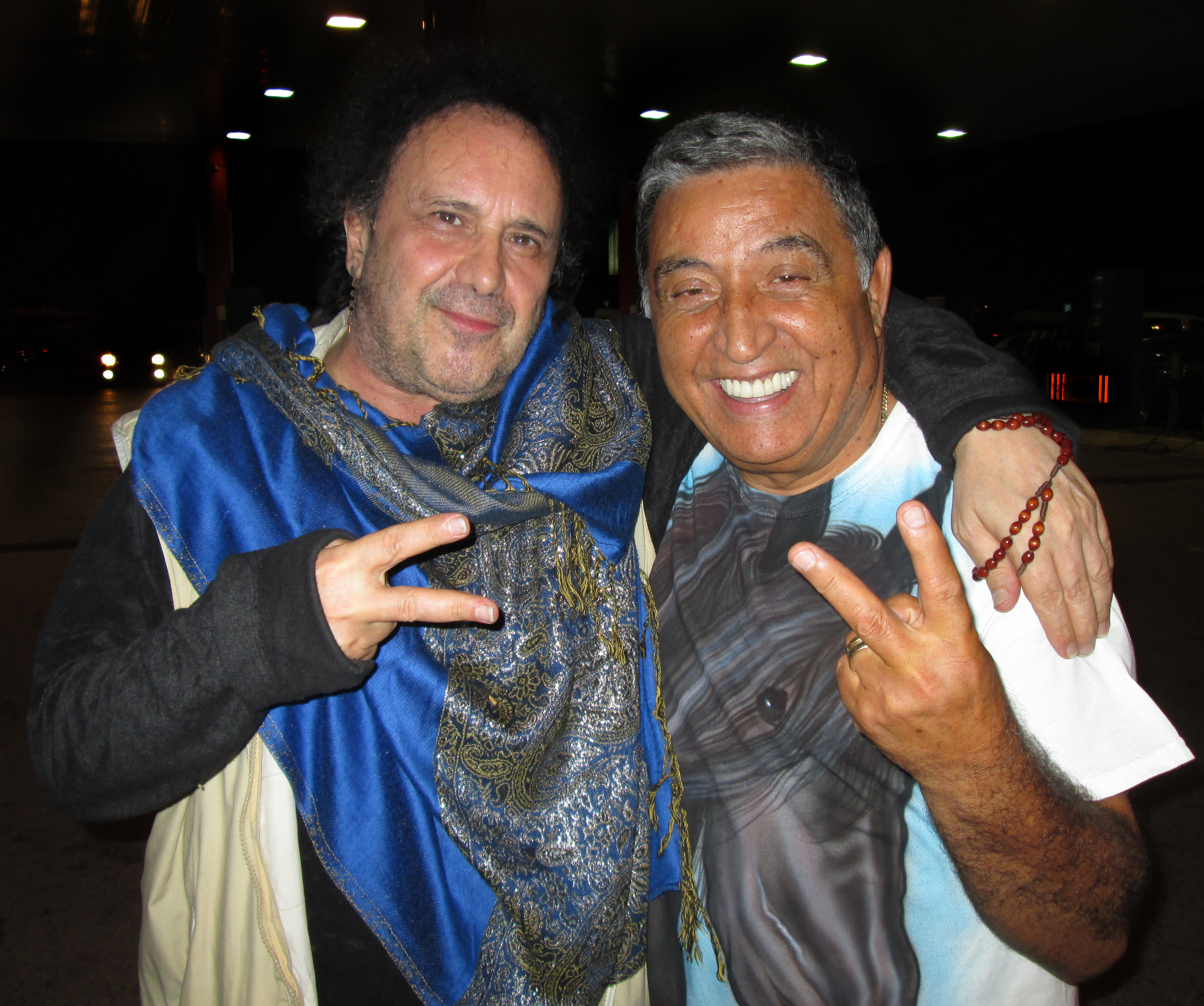
Enzo Avitabile and Mario Trevi (2015)

In the same year, he recorded "Black tarantella", an award-winning record with new songs that included duets and collaborations with outstanding international musicians from Europe, America and Africa like, among others, David Crosby, Bob Geldof and Franco Battiato.

In 2017, he won 2 Donatello's David Awards for best song and best soundtrack of the movie "Gli indivisibili".

In May 2026, Avitabile received an honoris causa from the University of Naples "L'Orientale". In October 2026, he received a Premio Tenco career award at the 49th edition of the event in Sanremo.

== Discography ==
- Avitabile (1982)
- Meglio soul (1983)
- Correre in fretta (1984)
- S.O.S. Brothers (1986)
- Alta tensione (1988)
- Stella dissidente (1990)
- Enzo Avitabile (1991)
- Easy (1994)
- Addò (1996)
- O-issa (1999)
- Salvamm'o munno (2004)
- Sacro Sud (2006)
- Festa, farina e forca (2007)
- Napoletana (2009)
- Black Tarantella (2012)
- Lotto infinito (2016)
- Pelle differente (2018)
