= Caparezza =

Italian rapper (born 1973)

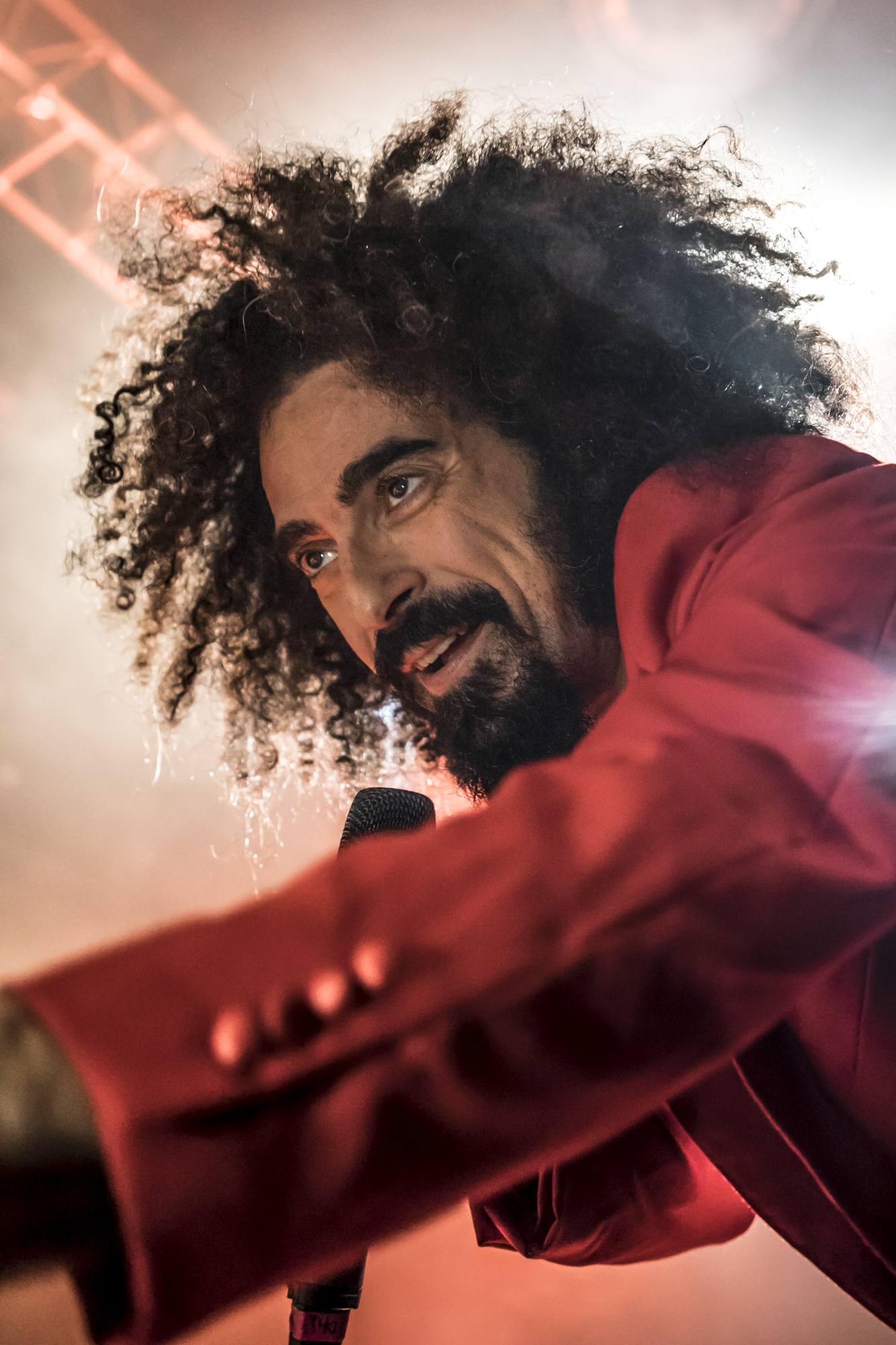
- Caparezza in 2014

Background information
- Born: Michele Salvemini; 9 October 1973 (age 53); Molfetta, Apulia, Italy
- Genres: Alternative hip hop; conscious hip hop; political hip hop; comedy hip hop; rap rock
- Years active: 1995–present
- Website: caparezza.com

Michele Salvemini (born 9 October 1973), better known by his stage name Caparezza (sometimes written CapaRezza), (Note: Italian pronunciation: [kapaˈrɛttsa] or [kapaˈrettsa], meaning 'Curly Head' in the Molfetta dialect; equivalent to standard Italian capo riccio or testa riccia.) is an Italian rapper.

== Biography ==
Michele Salvemini was born in Molfetta, in the southern region of Apulia, on 9 October 1973. He was raised in Molfetta. Caparezza's mother was a teacher and his father was a worker and former musician, so Michele started playing music as a child. He studied accounting, although he dreamed of writing comics. After completing High School, Michele began to work in advertising, and won a scholarship for the Academy of Media and Journalism in Milan. However, he soon decided to leave the advertising world to fully devote himself to music. He has described his political views as communist and is a longtime supporter of the Rifondazione Comunista party.

=== Early career ===
Salvemini began his career as Mikimix, a b-boy pop singer, releasing the album La mia buona stella. This early release was not well received; AllMusic gave the album 2.5 stars out of 5. He also anchored the broadcast Segnali di Fumo (Smoke Signals) together with Paola Maugeri on the Video Music Italian channel. After performing in Milan's pubs, Mikimix made his debut at the Castrocaro Music Festival and subsequently participated in two Sanremo Festivals in the "New Generation" section, in 1995 and in 1997.

=== From Mikimix to Caparezza ===
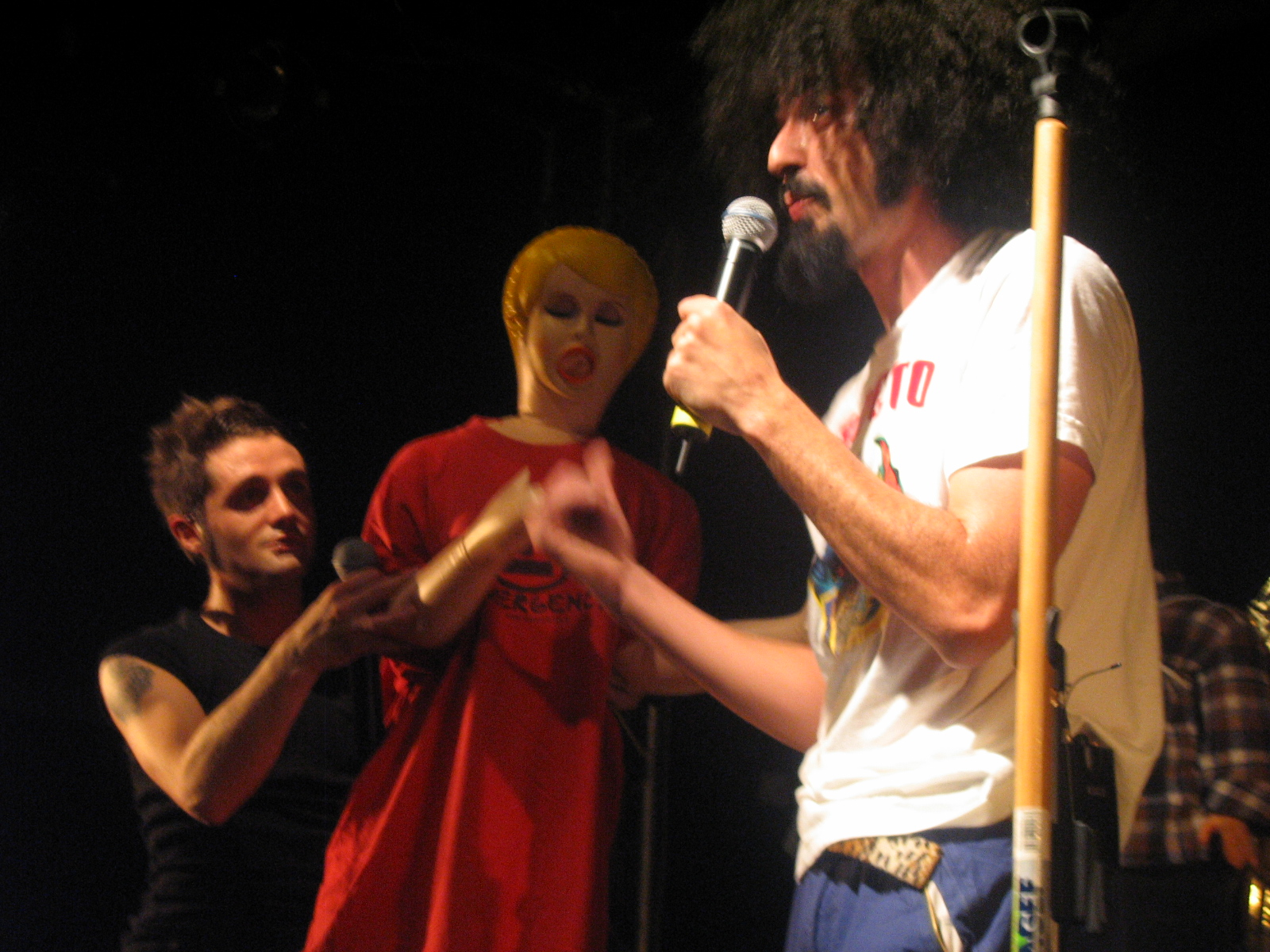
Caparezza in concert in Turin, 2006

==== CapaRezza ?! ====
Salvemini returned to Molfetta with no intention to further pursue a musical career but soon began to compose music in his garage. He also stopped cutting his hair and beard and changed his pseudonym from Mikimix to Caparezza ("Curly Head" in the Molfetta dialect). In 2000 he published his first album under his new stage name, ?!. In the album, he rejects the music he produced as Mikimix in favor of his new musical style. Reviewing the album for AllMusic, Jason Birchmeier wrote "The Italian rapper drops his rhymes with just as much fluency and dexterity as his American peers throughout the album. [...] Caparezza's mastery of the Italian dialect [makes] this album so stunning."

==== Verità supposte (Supposed Truths) and Habemus Capa ====
Salvemini's fourth album and second album under the name Caparezza, Verità supposte (note that in Italian "supposte" can mean both "supposed" and "suppositories"), was published on 13 June 2003 and led him to success in 2003–2004. In his second album, Caparezza talks about various problems distressing the Italian social reality through the ending of the old millennium as well as the beginning of the new one, also the condition of Southern Italy, with the characteristic cutting irony that made him be known. The single from this album "Fuori dal tunnel" ("Out of the Tunnel") enjoyed great success in Italy as a "summer hit"; however, the singer always opposed the song's use in clubs and on television because it was meant to denounce the de-individualization of entertainment. However, the contract with his record label barred him from preventing its use in the commercials or TV broadcasts criticized in the song. Another song on Verità supposte is "Vengo dalla Luna" ("I Come From the Moon"), which tells the story of an alien (Caparezza) who comes to Earth and is astonished by humanity's intolerance of different races and cultures. The song opposes prejudice toward immigrants.

His fifth album, Habemus Capa (a pun on the "habemus papam" statement with which the Catholic church announces a new pope), is a criticism of society's contradictions. Salvemini reconnects to "Jodellavitanonhocapitouncazzo" (a pun with "jodel" of the phrase "Io della vita non ho capito un cazzo", "I don't understand shit about life"), the last song of Verità supposte in which the artist imagines his own death after becoming insane. Thus Salvemini imagines what happens after his death and in his descent to Hell – which is actually our world, describing a dreadful aspect of modern society in every song. It was released on 24 March 2006. In Habemus Capa, songs include "La mia parte intollerante" ("My Intolerant Side") which again discusses marginalization by Caparezza identifying himself in a marginalized 16-year-old boy expressing all his desires for a more open and less vicious behaviour from teenagers.

==== Le dimensioni del mio caos (The Dimensions of my Chaos) ====
In 2008 he released his sixth album, Le dimensioni del mio caos, a concept album involving a time-warped hippie and social commentary regarding modern society. In a mixed review, AllMusic writer Mariano Prunes called it "ambitious but definitely overreaching", saying that "its length and unyielding energy can get grating as it goes along".

The song "Vieni a ballare in Puglia" ("Come Dance in Apulia") discusses economic and environmental issues in Puglia; the "Caduti del lavoro" ("Occupational fatality"), the forest fires in Gargano and the air pollution in Taranto. This song, like "Fuori dal tunnel", was generally misunderstood by the mainstream public who generally failed to understand its satirical nature and often interpreted it as a song praising the rapper's homeland. "Eroe (storia di Luigi delle Bicocche)" ("Hero (the Story of Luigi delle Bicocche)" – "bicocche" is a term now rarely used in Italian meaning "little house/fort", but is also used in some parts of Italy as a dialectal contraction of "albicocche", "apricots") tells the story of a blue-collar worker who manages to support a family while resisting the temptations of loan sharks and draw poker, hailing him as a true hero.

After the release of Habemus Capa and before releasing Le dimensioni del mio caos, Caparezza also published a book in 2008, Saghe mentali, a humorous description of his discography, including the soon to be released Le dimensioni del mio caos, using a different literary style for each album.

==== Il sogno eretico (The Heretic Dream) ====
On 28 January 2011, he published the first single from the seventh album Il sogno eretico, entitled "Goodbye Malinconia", featuring Tony Hadley of Spandau Ballet.

Il sogno eretico, published on 1 March 2011 is a concept album that urges its listeners to reject tenets and dogma and to use critical thinking. The songs allude to historic figures who were labeled heretics, including Galileo Galilei, Joan of Arc, Giordano Bruno and Girolamo Savonarola. Salvemini links the lives of these figures to topical interests for the purpose of interpreting widely known facts from a different angle. In the song "La fine di Gaia" ("The End of Gaia") Caparezza addresses end of the world prophecies (denying their validity) and various conspiracy theories, while in other songs he discusses religion, politics, misbehavior and attitudes towards wealth and power.

==== Museica ====
On 22 April 2014, his sixth album is published entitled Museica, whose name is a portmanteau of the three key words of this album: "musica" ("music"), "museo" ("museum") and "sei" ("six"). In this album, recorded in Molfetta and then mixed in Los Angeles by Chris Lord-Alge, Caparezza uses as a medium several famous pieces of art as well as artistic movements to explain various concepts revolving around art and connected to it, but also modern themes and problematics – thus using art as a way to escape from the violence of the world as art creates a parallel, ideal reality. The artist describes this album as "his own museum" and the composition of the album describes a tour in this ideal museum of his.

The album has also been his first album to reach position nº 1 in the Italian FIMI album chart.

==== Prisoner 709 ====
Announced the 13 June of the same year, on 15 September 2017 Caparezza's seventh album, Prisoner 709, is published. This concept album is greatly different from the previous ones as Salvemini imagines himself as a prisoner of his own mind: this album has been inspired from a crisis and a consequent deep depression born after Salvemini begun suffering tinnitus in 2015, condition around which the album revolves.

In this album, as already said, Salvemini talks about being caged inside his own mind and uses this as a way to express himself, his drive, his personal issues and his beliefs – also by comparing himself Michele and himself Caparezza (this is also highlighted by the fact that the "7" and the "9" in the album title are referring to the letters' number respectively of the names "Michele" and "Caparezza"). Every song of this album also has a subheading that tells step by step the various phases of imprisonment and jailbreak.

The album has been introduced by the videoclips of two songs: the nominal track "Prisoner 709" and the single "Ti fa stare bene" ("Makes You Feel Good"), published respectively on 7 and 15 September 2017. The publication of this two songs also reflect the duality of the album, with "Prisoner 709" having hard tones and an anguishing atmosphere while "Ti fa stare bene" is a more cheerful, light-hearted song. This duality is shown even further in the album special edition (called the "Escape Edition"), including two LPs, one black and one white, in which the songs are divided whether they were, respectively, sharp or energetic. On 12 January 2018, "Una chiave" ("A Key") is released as the second single of the album; the videoclip of the song is published on YouTube on 26 January. On 21 May is released the videoclip for the third single "Larsen".

==== Exuvia ====
In 2021, Caparezza released his eighth solo album Exuvia. The rap-rock record was a jam-packed effort, with 19 songs included on the album. El Sendero, the biggest hit on the album featured Mishel Domenssain's vocals that evoke an oneiric quality. Another popular track from the record was La Scelta, which incorpated elements of funk.

==== Orbit Orbit ====
Caparezza announced he would be working on a new album in October of 2024 via Instagram post. The following year BMG announced his signing to their label. In July of 2025, Orbit Orbit went on pre-order alongside a tie in comic book of the same name. Salvemini subsequently announced that he would return to touring in the summer of 2026. The music video for the first single, "Io Sono Il Viaggio" ("I am the Journey") dropped on his birthday date ( 9th of October). The album was released on 31st October.

Caparezza detailed that in Orbit Orbit he "tried to close a circle that start with Prisoner [709] and continued into Exuvia, so, prisoner and escape. Now I am at the chapter on freedom." He stated that his hearing problems continued and where music did not, comics had helped him channel energy. During this appearance, he stated he drew inspiration for the album from Giorgio Moroder, Kraftwerk, and The Rockets, all artists he was interested in as a child. In a separate interview he talked about including sounds from science fiction movies.

In July 2026, Orbit Orbit won the Targa Tenco for the best album overall (Migliore album in assoluto), with 57 votes.

=== Band members and collaborations ===
Michele sings together with Diego Perrone, who replaced Stefano Ciannamea (the creator, and now administrator of Caparezza's official web site). Diego Perrone is also the lead singer in the band Medusa. Caparezza was also a member of Sunny Cola Connection, a group who sings in the Salento dialect. He has also worked with many other musicians, like the Italian rappers Puni, Piotta, 99 Posse ("Tarantelle pé campà") and Mondo Marcio and with pop musician Roy Paci & Aretuska, and with Medusa.

Caparezza's band includes Rino Corrieri (drums), Gaetano Camporeale (keyboards), Giovanni Astorino (bass) and Alfredo Ferrero (guitar).

== Style and influences ==
According to Jason Birchmeier, Caparezza's music features "an uncanny style of beats that defy much of the precedent established by [American hip hop]". Mariano Prunes describes Caparezza as "[defying] classification with his fascinating cross-contamination of styles". Caparezza's music incorporates breakbeats and live instrumentation, encompassing influence from American West Coast and East Coast hip hop, europop, heavy metal and reggae. Birchmeier says that Caparezza's beats "draw their sounds from everywhere" and "it's [his] experimental approach to beat-making, [and] mastery of the Italian dialect, [which makes his music] so stunning." According to Prunes, Caparezza's sound is rooted in the music of Frank Zappa and Black Sabbath, rather than Tupac Shakur.

Caparezza's lyrics focus on subjects such as personal honesty and the hypocrisy of the music industry. Caparezza's live performances incorporate theatrical costumes, comedy sketches and monologues, projected videos, props, and actors. Caparezza is backed by a rock band, rather than a DJ.

== Discography ==
=== As Mikimix ===
- Tengo duro (1997)
- La mia buona stella (1997)

=== As Caparezza ===
- ?! (2000)
- Verità supposte (2003)
- Habemus Capa (2006)
- Le dimensioni del mio caos (2008)
- Il sogno eretico (2011)
- Museica (2014)
- Prisoner 709 (2017)
- Exuvia (2021)
- Orbit Orbit (2025)
