= Elena Ledda =

Italian singer from Sardinia (born 1959)

Elena Ledda (born 17 May 1959 in Selargius) is an Italian singer from Sardinia.

== Early life ==
Born near Cagliari, Ledda pursued conservatory studies in oboe and voice.

== Career ==
Her soprano voice was suitable for opera, which she performed early in her career, but she was attracted by the folk singing of her native Sardinia and eventually recorded primarily in that genre. She worked with Cooperativa Teatro di Sardegna in the late 1970s and has toured and recorded internationally.

She was chosen by Sardinian movie director, Gianfranco Cabiddu, to be the leading voice for his live music/cinematic mix project, Sonos de Memoria, featuring film footage of Sardinia from the 1930s and leading contemporary Sardinian musicians playing over the film. Sonos toured the world with other Sardinian musicians such as Paolo Fresu.

In 2006, Ledda participated in Visioni di Sardegna, written and produced by her longtime collaborator Mauro Palmas, who restored film footage of Sardinia from the Luce Institute, and assembled 18 musicians under the direction of RAI TV director, Rodolfo Roberti. Greek singer Savina Yannatou was invited to feature in the project.

Her collaboration with Savina Yannatou resulted in a series of ten concerts at the Half Note club in Athens at the end of March 2006. This met with critical acclaim and TV interest in Greece, and resulted in a CD (Tutti Baci, Lyra 1095) also featuring Mauro Palmas and Primavera en Salonico.

Ledda's collaborators have included Lester Bowie, Israeli singer Noa, Maria del Mar Bonet (Mallorca), Paolo Fresu, Andreas Vollenweider, Don Cherry, and Nana Vasconcelos. In 2005 Elena collaborated with Neapolitan violinist, Lino Cannavacciuolo (Peppe Barra's violinist and original founder of the Solis String Quartet, now Noa's band of choice) to produce her CD Amargura.

The BBC's Andy Kershaw said of Ledda, "I planned a trip south to make a program about Sardinian music, almost solely on the evidence of a CD I was given of Elena's voice. We went to Sardinia and I was blown away. Elena and her band make traditional music from Sardinia using all the mainstream instruments, with hardly any 'traditional Sardinian' instruments in sight, yet it sounds so traditional and so not-mainstream. They have achieved a truly unique and refreshing sound. Clearly rooted to Sardinian tradition, yet so modern."

A 2007 recording was done with Andrea Parodi, who died before completing the work. Ledda sang at Parodi's funeral.

== Discography ==
- Ammentos (1979)
- Is Arrosas (1984)
- Sonos (1989)
- Incanti (1993)
- Maremannu (2000)
- Amargura (2005)
- Lantias (2018)
