= ?! (album) =

Studio album by Caparezza
- Released: May 26, 2000
- Label: Virgin

Caparezza chronology
La mia buona stella (1997)	?! (2000)	Verità supposte (2003)

Singles from ?!
- 1. "Tutto ciò che c'è" Released: 2000; 2. "Tutto ciò che c'è (Remix)" Released: 2000; 3. "La fitta sassoia dell'ingiuria" Released: 2000; 4. "Chi c*zzo me lo fa fare" Released: 2001; 5. "La gente originale" Released: 2001

?! (pronounced Punto interrogativo punto esclamativo, "Question mark exclamation mark") is the debut studio album by Italian rapper Caparezza, after two releases published under the former stage name Mikimix.

== Description ==
?! is Caparezza's first official publication since the interruption of his musical activity as Mikimix. The music album has fourteen tracks, many of which are remakes of songs originally published in Caparezza's two demos, Ricomincio da Capa and Zappa.

There are some samples on the disc. Intro contains an item of Guida nel suono a tre dimensioni del Sei Fasi Superstereo, Tutto ciò che c'è contains a piece of the song La filastrocca by Raoul Casadei, and La fitta sassaiola dell'ingiuria contains part of the song Confessioni di un malandrino by Angelo Branduardi.

== Reception ==
Professional ratings
Review scores
Source	Rating
AllMusic	4/5 stars

Reviewing the album for AllMusic, Jason Birchmeier wrote, "The Italian rapper drops his rhymes with just as much fluency and dexterity as his American peers throughout the album. [...] Caparezza's mastery of the Italian dialect [makes] this album so stunning."

== Track listing ==
No.	Title	Length
1.	"Intro"	1:20
2.	"Mea culpa"	4:01
3.	"Tutto ciò che c'è"	2:50
4.	"Mammiamiamamma"	3:46
5.	"La gente originale (The Original People)"	3:50
6.	"Il conflitto (The Conflict)"	3:56
7.	"Fuck the violenza (Fuck the Violence)"	3:37
8.	"Ti clonerò (I'll Clone You)"	4:17
9.	"La fitta sassaiola dell'ingiuria"	4:07
10.	"Chi c*zzo me lo (Who the F*ck Lets Me)"	4:02
11.	"Mi è impossibile (It's Impossible)"	3:57
12.	"Uomini di molta fede (Men with Huge Faith)"	4:18
13.	"Cammina solo (Walk Alone)"	4:25
14.	"Dindalè dindalò"	7:00
