= Club Tenco =

Italian non-profit association

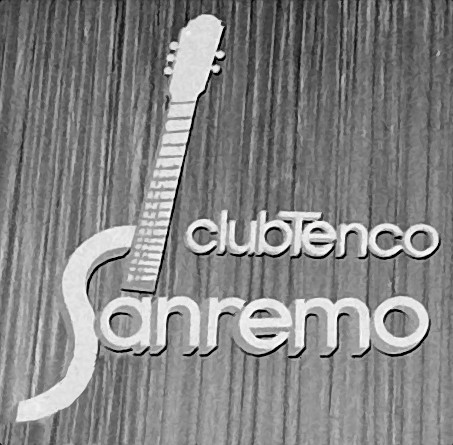

Club Tenco is an Italian non-profit association dedicated to supporting "canzone d'autore" (Auteur music).

== History and profile ==
It was established in Sanremo in 1972 by Amilcare Rambaldi. The third association named after singer-songwriter Luigi Tenco after the clubs founded in Rome and Venice in 1967, it has been described as the "Italian leading point for songwriting" and "a fundamental driving force behind new ideas for quality music". According to its statute, its scope is "to gather all those who, brought together by Luigi Tenco's message, seek to valorise "canzone d'autore", pursuing artistic dignity and poetic realism within popular music".

The club publishes records and books and organises exhibitions and festivals throughout Italy, the most important of them being the "Rassegna della canzone d'autore", commonly known as Premio Tenco, which was founded in 1974 and during which the prestigious Premio Tenco ("Tenco Prize", a career award to singer-songwriters and cultural operators) and Targa Tenco ("Tenco Plate", a prize established in 1984 and given for the best works of the year) are assigned.

== List of winners ==
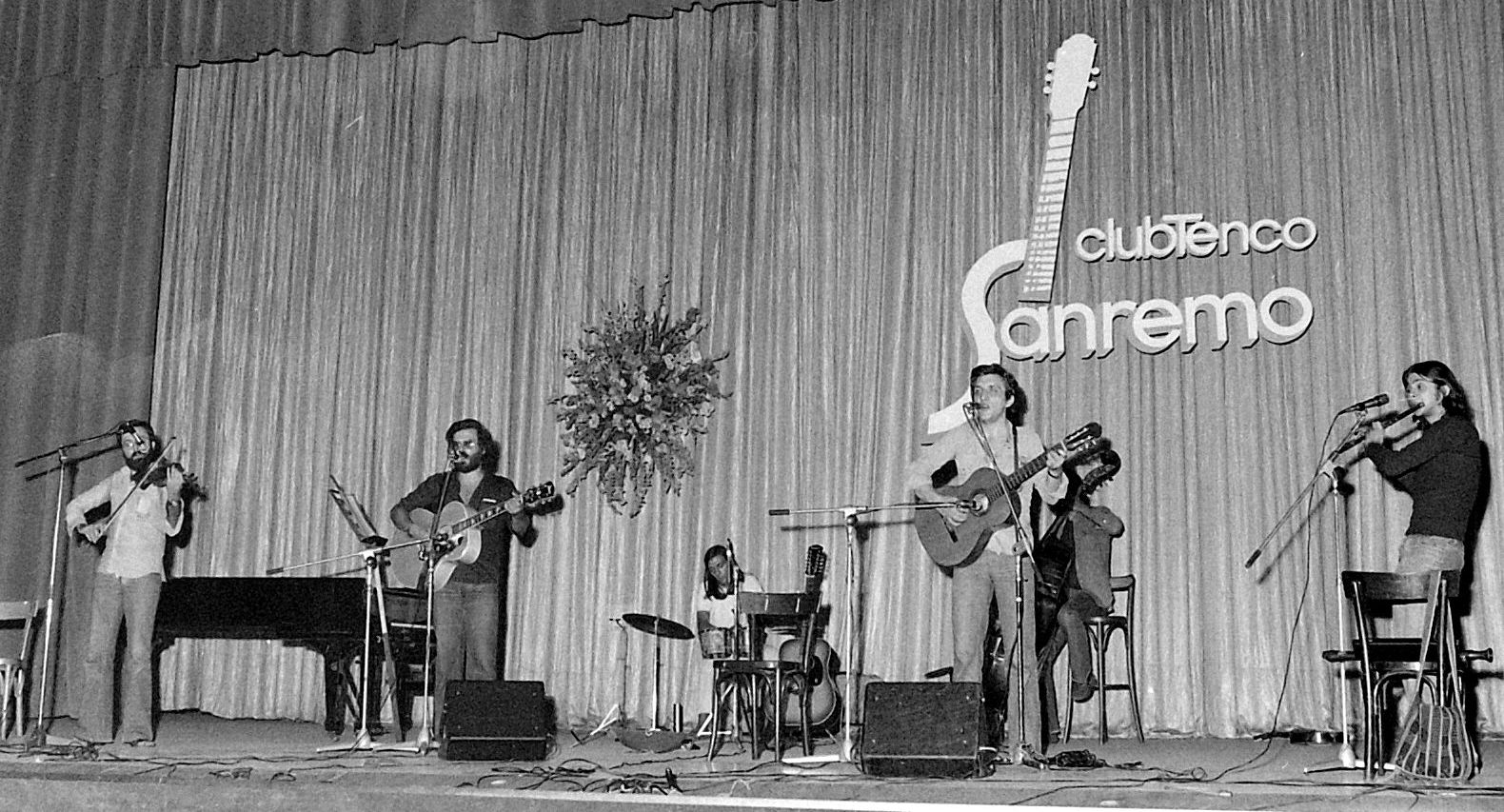
Pan Brumisti in 1976

=== Premio Tenco ===
- 1974 - Léo Ferré, Sergio Endrigo, Giorgio Gaber, Domenico Modugno, Gino Paoli
- 1975 - Vinicius de Moraes, Fausto Amodei, Umberto Bindi, Fabrizio De André, Francesco Guccini, Enzo Jannacci
- 1976 - Georges Brassens
- 1977 - Jacques Brel
- 1978 - Leonard Cohen
- 1979 - Lluís Llach
- 1980 - Atahualpa Yupanqui
- 1981 - Chico Buarque de Hollanda, Ornella Vanoni
- 1982 - Arsen Dedić
- 1983 -Alan Stivell, Paolo Conte, Giovanna Marini, Roberto Vecchioni
- 1984 - Colette Magny
- 1985 -Silvio Rodríguez, Dave Van Ronk, Bulat Okudzhava
- 1986 -Tom Waits, Joan Manuel Serrat
- 1987 - Not assigned
- 1988 -Joni Mitchell
- 1989 - Randy Newman
- 1990 - Caetano Veloso
- 1991 - Charles Trenet
- 1992 - Not assigned
- 1993 - Vladimir Vysotsky (posthumous)
- 1994 - Pablo Milanés
- 1995 - Sérgio Godinho
- 1996 - Renato Carosone
- 1997 - Jackson Browne
- 1998 - Elvis Costello
- 1999 - Bruce Cockburn, Zülfü Livaneli
- 2000 - Nick Cave, Rickie Lee Jones
- 2001 - Laurie Anderson, Luis Eduardo Aute
- 2002 - Donovan, Gilberto Gil
- 2003 - Eric Andersen, Patti Smith
- 2004 - Peter Hammill
- 2005 - John Cale, Khaled
- 2006 - Willy DeVille, Bruno Lauzi
- 2007 - Jacques Higelin
- 2008 - Milton Nascimento
- 2009 - Franco Battiato, Angélique Kidjo
- 2010 - Paul Brady
- 2011 - Luciano Ligabue, Jaromír Nohavica
- 2012 - Frank London & The Klezmatics
- 2013 - Robyn Hitchcock
- 2014 - José Mário Branco, David Crosby, Maria Farantouri, Plastic People of the Universe, John Trudell
- 2015 - Francesco Guccini, Jacqui McShee
- 2016 - Otello Profazio, Stan Ridgway
- 2017 - Vinicio Capossela
- 2018 - Zucchero Fornaciari, Salvatore Adamo
- 2019 - Pino Donaggio, Gianna Nannini, Eric Burdon
- 2020 - Vasco Rossi, Sting
- 2021 - Mogol, Fiorella Mannoia, Vittorio De Scalzi, Paolo Pietrangeli, Enrico Ruggeri, Stefano Bollani, Marisa Monte
- 2022 - Alice, Claudio Baglioni, Angelo Branduardi, Fabio Concato, Yuri Shevchuk, Giorgio Conte, Bénabar, Michael McDermott
- 2023 - Carmen Consoli, Eugenio Finardi, Ron, Tom Zé
- 2024 - Edoardo Bennato, Samuele Bersani, Mimmo Locasciulli, Teresa Parodi
- 2025 - Baustelle, Goran Bregović, Ricky Gianco, Daniele Silvestri, Tosca
- 2026 - Manuel Agnelli & Afterhours, Enzo Avitabile, Frankie Hi-NRG MC, Max Manfredi, Paola Turci

=== Targa Tenco ===
- See Targa Tenco
