= Andrea Parodi =

Italian singer (1955–2006)

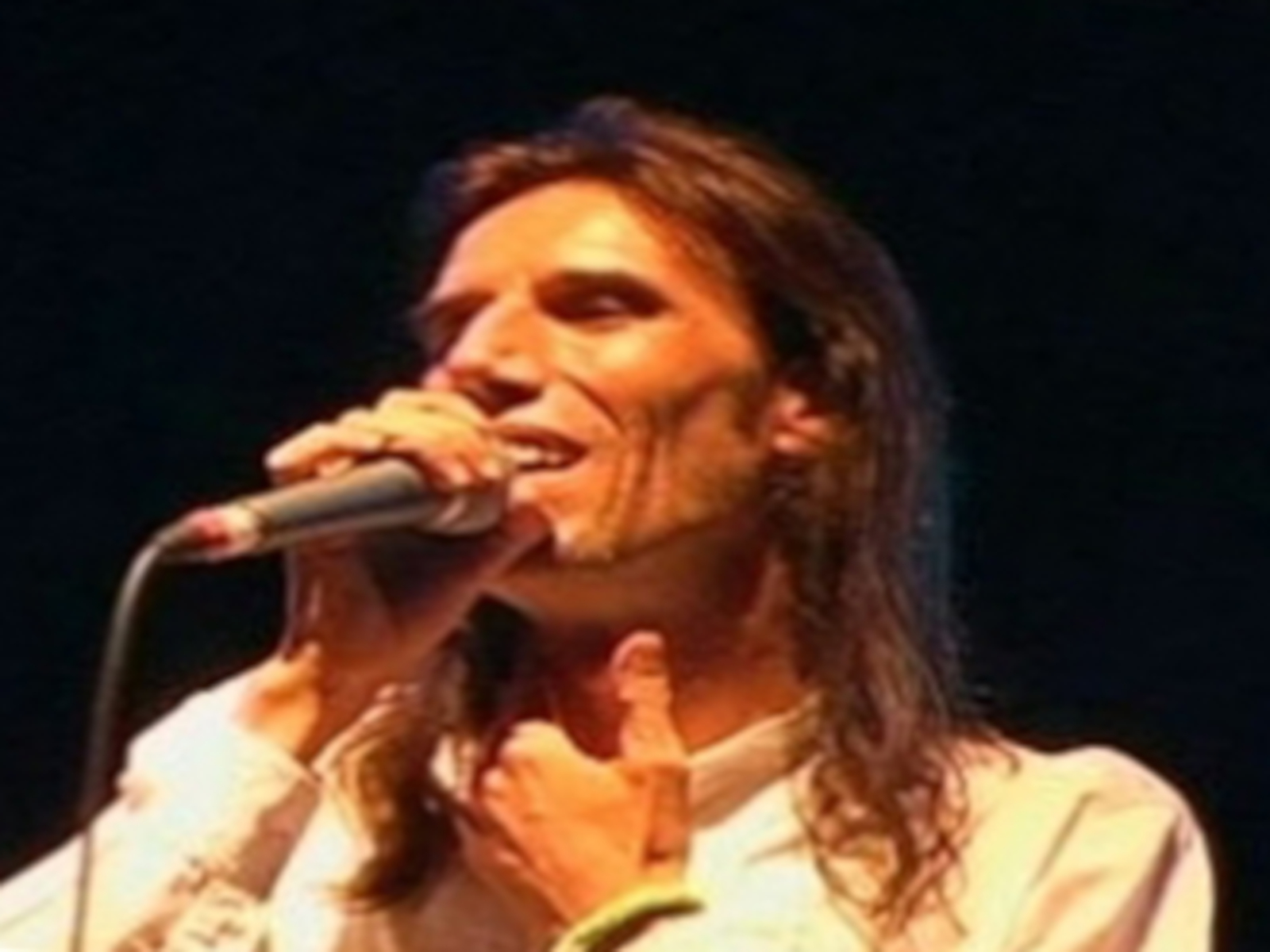

Background information
- Born: 18 July 1955; Porto Torres, Italy
- Died: 17 October 2006 (aged 51) Quartu Sant'Elena, Italy
- Genres: Folk rock, pop rock
- Occupation(s): Singer, record producer
- Years active: 1977–2006

Andrea Parodi (18 July 1955 – 17 October 2006) was an Italian singer from Sardinia. He is known for his vocals with several groups, including Coro degli Angeli from 1978 to 1987, and Tazenda from 1988 to 1997 and again 2005–2006, as well as his solo career.

His work, including that with Tazenda, blended folk roots of Sardinia with rock and Italian pop, bringing international attention to the island's culture, including the Sardinian language. He worked extensively with various international artists.

He was director for a video about Tazenda and some documentaries on Sardinia, and was producer for other artists, such as fellow Sardinian, Marino de Rosas.

He died from cancer, before fully completing planned work on the album, Rosa Resolza, with Elena Ledda, which was released in 2007.

A museum exhibit was established in 2010. In 2015, the Sardinian town of Nulvi dedicated a new park to him. His legacy also endures in the Premio Andrea Parodi, an annual prize for World Music which exists since 2007.

== Discography ==
=== Albums ===
With Coro degli Angeli
Studio albums

- 1982 – Canzoni di Mogol – Battisti
- 1984 – Misterios
- 1986 – Shangay

Live albums

- 1980 – Cantare – Gianni Morandi
- 1983 – Live @ RTSI Gianni Morandi
- 1997 – Coro degli Angeli Live Concert 1984/87

With Tazenda Studio albums

- 1988 – Tazenda
- 1991 – Murales
- 1992 – Limba
- 1995 – Fortza paris

Live albums

- 1993 – Il popolo rock
- 2005 – Tazenda

Compilations

- 1997 – Il sole di Tazenda

=== Solo ===
- 2002 – Abacada (Storie di note, AV 01)
- 2004 – Andrea Parodi
- 2005 – Midsummer Night in Sardinia, with Al Di Meola
- 2006 – Intimi Raccolti
- 2007 – Rosa Resolza, with Elena Ledda

=== Participant ===
- 1993 – Soft Songs
- 2005 – Indaco - Porte d'oriente
