= C.F.F. e il Nomade Venerabile =

Italian alternative rock band

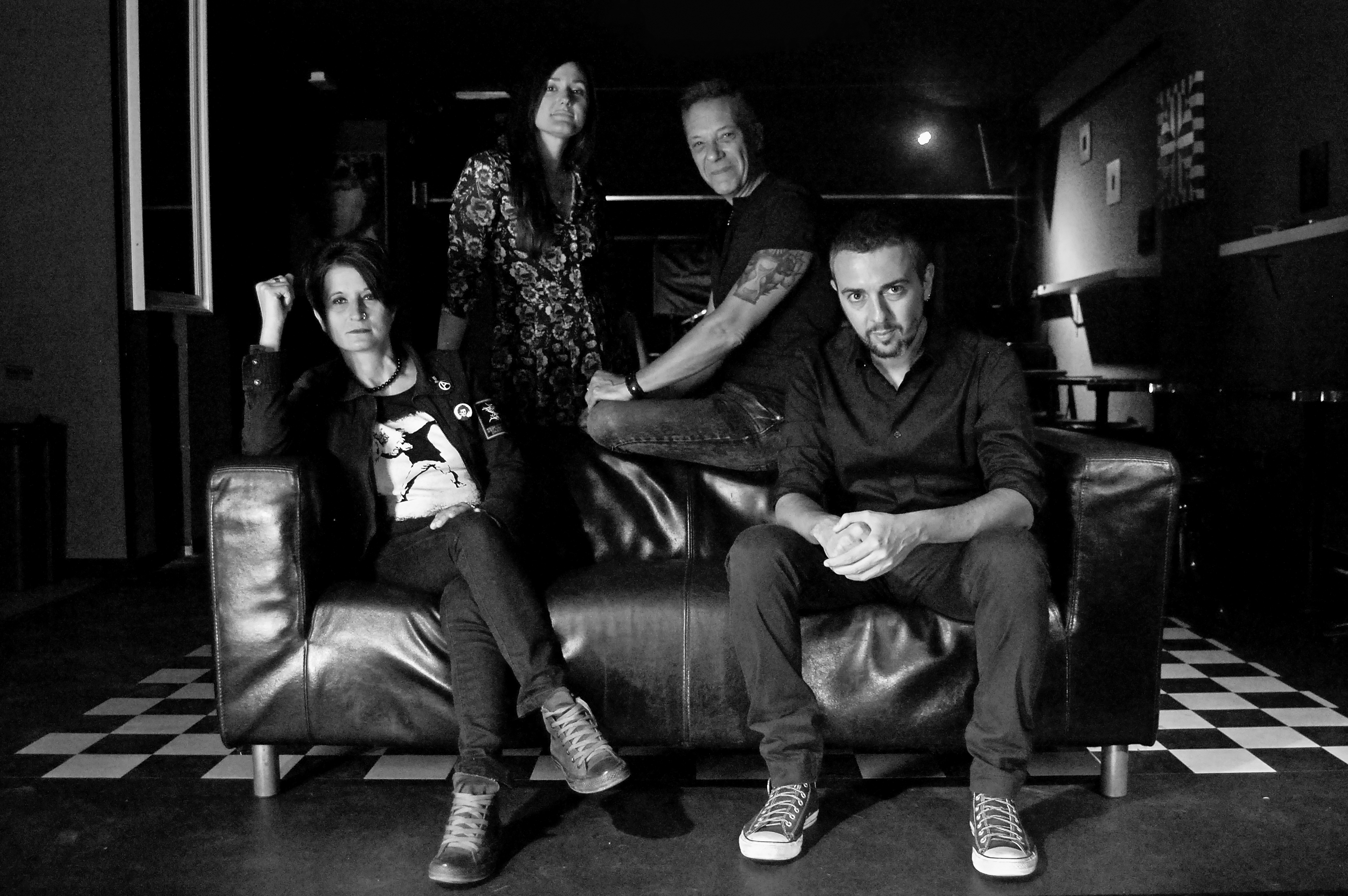

Background information
- Origin: Gioia del Colle, Apulia, Italy
- Genres: new wave, rock music
- Years active: 1999–present
- Label: Elleu Multimedia - Otium Records - Compagnia Nuove Indye - Maxsound Records - Audioglobe
- Members: Vanni La Guardia; Anna Maria Stasi; Anna Surico; Guido Lioi

C.F.F. e il Nomade Venerabile is an Italian alternative rock band formed in 1999 in Gioia del Colle (Bari, Apulia).

== Musical style ==
The band stands out for its experimental approach, which combines new wave rock music with theater-dance and video art.

C.F.F. means Conceptual (Concettuale in Italian) Physical (Fisico) Bother (Fastidio). Conceptual because the text is very important in their songs. Physical and Bother because the band offers multidisciplinary concerts with strong visual and sound contrasts. Nomade and Venerabile are the pseudonyms of the two men who were in charge of theatrical performances at the beginning.

== History ==
=== The beginnings (1999–2003) ===
The group’s debut on disc took place with the mini-CD Presa diretta, a radio live performance recorded in 2002 during the Vitamine program of Controradio in Bari. They participated in the Matera stage of the I-Tim tour of Red Ronnie and, after winning the Liberi Tutti Rock Festival in Reggio Calabria and having opened the Caparezza concert in the Jumpin'Rock Festival in Bari, they published a first CD, Ghiaccio, reissued in 2005 by Elleu Multimedia / Banda Larga and presented at the M.E.I. (Meeting delle Etichette Indipendenti) in Faenza.

=== The new wave period (2004–2008) ===
Ghiaccio was promoted with a long tour (in 2004 a total of 52 concerts) which saw the group open the concert of Marlene Kuntz in the Festival Rockincorso 2004 in Venafro and then saw them as guests of the Atellana Festival 2005 in Succivo with Giorgio Canali and Rossofuoco, as guests of the Orte Rock Festival in Orte with Moltheni, and as guests of the Rassegna Creativa in Bologna. In August 2005 they played at Sziget Festival in Budapest, in 2006 they win the Roccalling Festival of Roccagorga and they play at the Venerelettrica International Female Rock Festival in Perugia (the artistic director Paola Turci declares to the Corriere dell'Umbria on 4 March 2006: "I saw the performance of the C.F.F. e il Nomade Venerabile. I greatly appreciated their ability to dare, to go beyond the boundaries of creativity").

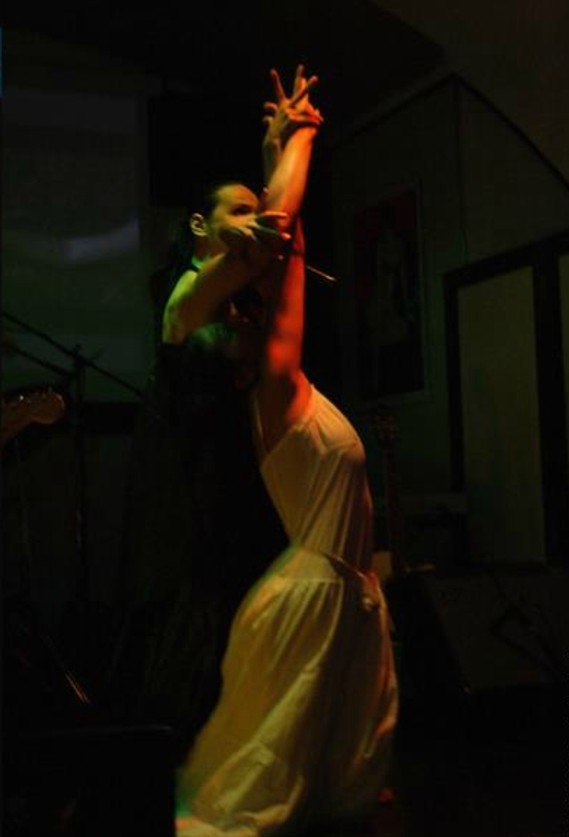
C.F.F. e il Nomade Venerabile in 2008, photo by Daniela Errico

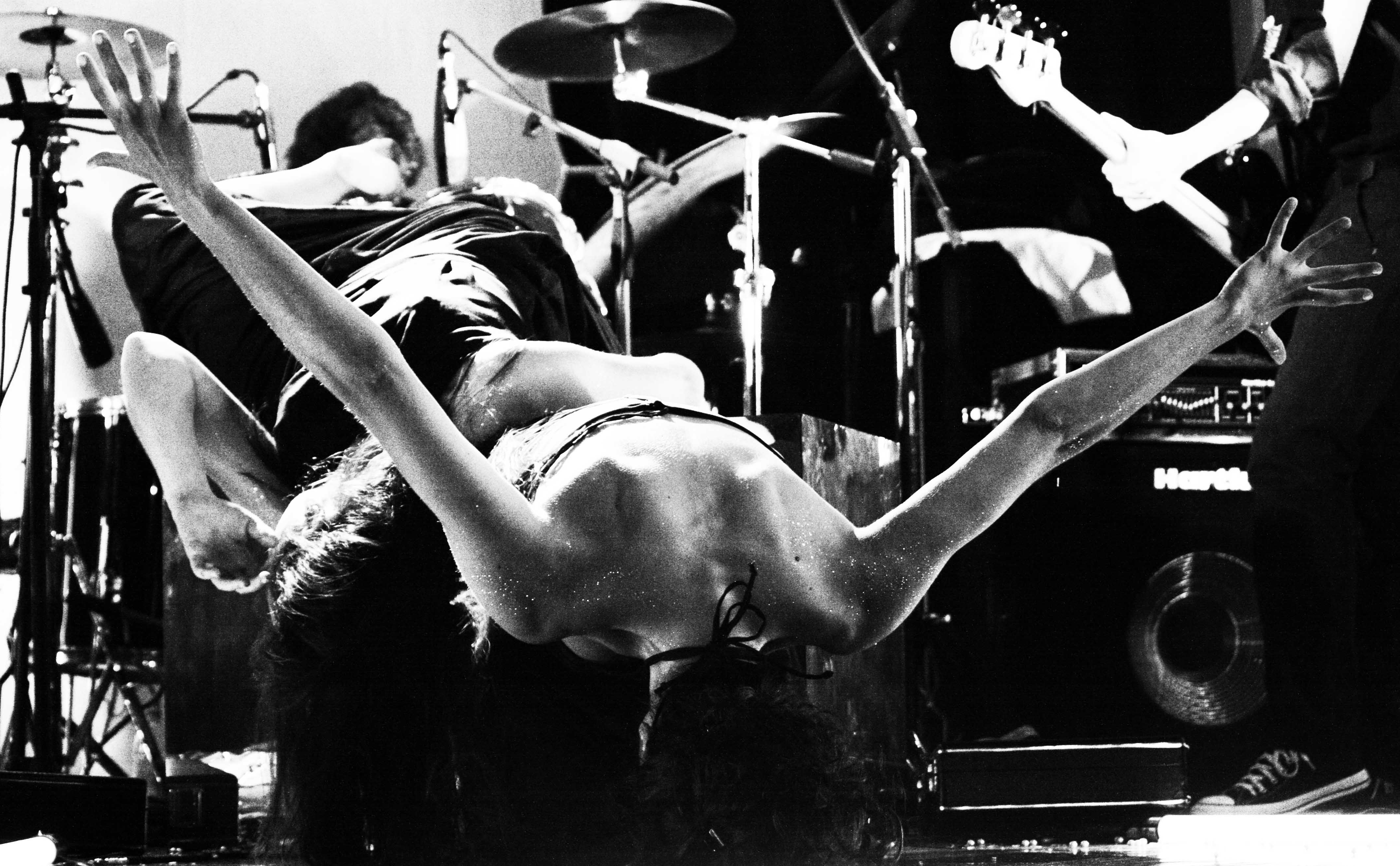
C.F.F. e il Nomade Venerabile in 2009, photo by Rosa Paolicelli

The specialized press deals with the group and articles and reviews are published on Rockerilla (October 2004) and Rolling Stone Italia (May 2006); the journalist Antonella Gaeta writes an article on La Repubblica dated 17 September 2005 entitled "After the taranta, here is rock. On the music there is the Puglia effect", dedicated to 5 bands, including C.F.F. e il Nomade Venerabile and Negramaro. National radios such as Radio Popolare and Radio Onda Rossa also dedicate space and attention to the band. A song from the album, Satori, is selected for the compilation The Best of Indies in Italy (Eko Music / Audiocoop), distributed at MIDEM 2006 in Cannes, a compilation that also contains songs of Afterhours, Paola Turci, Bandabardò, Skiantos. Another song from the album, Fiumani, dedicated to the leader of Diaframma, is selected for the compilation The best of DEMO 2004-2005, made by the staff of the transmission Demo, l'Acchiappatalenti of Rai Radio 1.

In December 2006 they began to collaborate with the dance theater company Res Extensa of Anna Moscatelli and Elisa Barucchieri (dancer and choreographer who has collaborated with artists such as Susanne Linke, Franco Battiato, Carolyn Carlson) and released the second album Circostanze (Otium Records / Tre Lune Records). The tour starts from the Villaggio Globale of Rome and continues with 40 dates, including participation in the Festival Pigro, a tribute to Ivan Graziani, at the Municipal Theater of Teramo. On the occasion of one of these dates, Rosaria Renna signals the voice of the C.F.F. e il Nomade Venerabile Anna Maria Stasi as a young Antonella Ruggiero. Some tracks on the album become part of the soundtrack of Ageroland, a film by Carlotta Cerquetti.

=== The rock breakthrough (2009–2013) ===
The third album Lucidinervi (Otium Records / Compagnia Nuove Indye) was released in 2009, featuring some of the main exponents of Italian independent music such as Paolo Benvegnù in the song Amore, Franz Goria (Fluxus, Petrol), Umberto Palazzo of Santo Niente (in Un jour noir, a song that reinterprets Baudelaire's poetry Spleen), Paolo Archetti Maestri and Fabio Martino from Yo Yo Mundi (in the Fabrizio De André cover "Ho visto Nina volare"). Paolo Benvegnù declares: "C.F.F. e il Nomade Venerabile are for me one of the best groups in Italy" (interview with Barisera on 29 July 2009).

Lucidinervi is also reviewed on the pages of Il Mucchio Selvaggio (September 2009) and supported by a tour divided between festivals and music clubs.

The song Amore ranks among the top ten places in the Indie Music Like chart (over 150 media and new media from all over Italy vote for their favorite independent Italian music tracks) curated by M.E.I. Important collaborations are also born in this period: the singer of C.F.F. e il Nomade Venerabile Anna Maria Stasi is a guest of Yo Yo Mundi at the teatro Ariston for the "Luigi Tenco Prize" in November 2009.

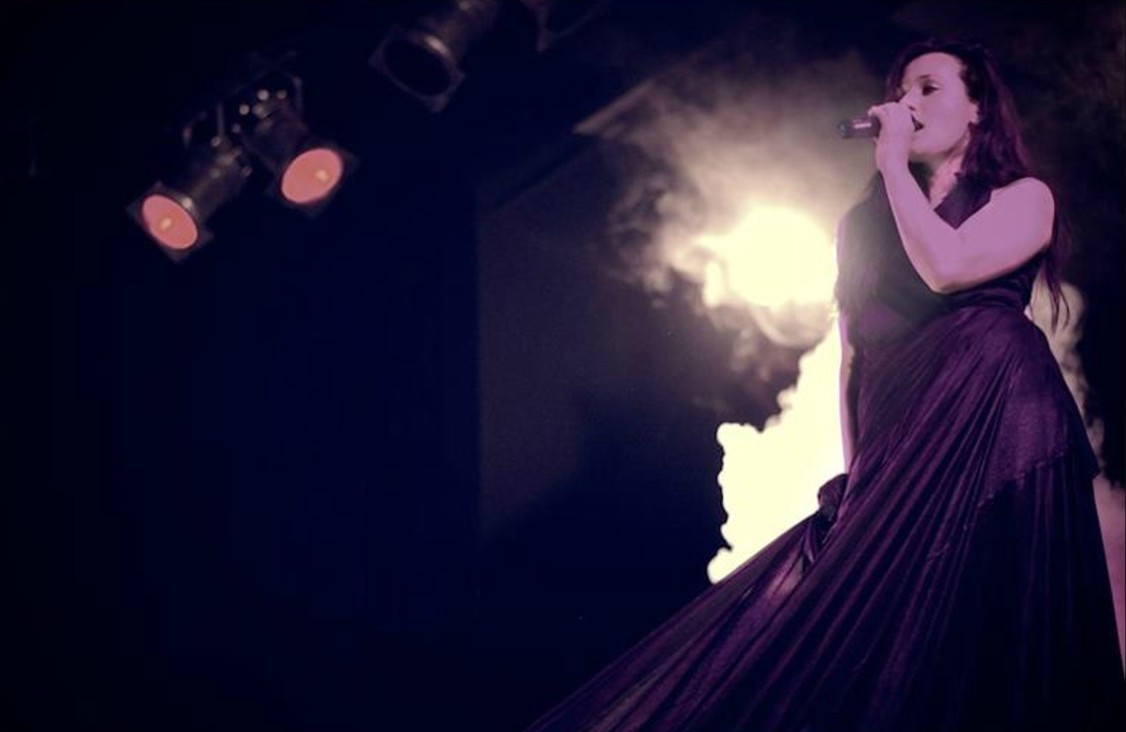
C.F.F. e il Nomade Venerabile in 2010

In the summer of 2011 they are rewarded by the artistic direction of the Valle Ofanto Festival in Margherita di Savoia with the Special Prize Matteo Salvatore, in collaboration with Club Tenco.

Attraverso is their fourth album (2013, self-production), which contains 13 post rock shoegaze songs and it is selected among the "top" albums by Rockit.

In the same year, the C.F.F. e il Nomade Venerabile bass player Vanni La Guardia conceived the Rockerella project which then became the documentary "Rockerella, history of music by Gioia del Colle since the 1950s to the present day", available on YouTube.

=== The C.F.F. period (2014–2018) ===
In 2014 they release with the abbreviated name C.F.F. the electro-acoustic EP Al cuore (Maxsound Records), followed by a tour of about thirty dates and reviewed by Classic Rock Lifestyle - Italia. The single taken from the EP is Il mio inverno, the videoclip is made by the director Enzo Piglionica. They are selected for the Musicultura auditions in Macerata, they are national finalists of the De Andrè Prize in Rome and win the Pierangelo Bertoli Prize at the Teatro Carani in Sassuolo. The jury is made up of Massimo Cotto (Virgin Radio), Giancarlo Governi (RAI), Andrea Scanzi (Il Fatto Quotidiano).

In 2015 they release the album Canti notturni (Maxsound Records / Audioglobe), supported by a crowdfunding campaign on Musicraiser, produced by Max Carola (chief engineer in Capri Digital Studios, working with Aerosmith, INXS, Roxette, Banco del Mutuo Soccorso...) and featuring Roberto Angelini, the son of Vittorio Camardese's partner. The album also contains Stelle nere, a song written for C.F.F. by Paolo Archetti Maestri of Yo Yo Mundi.

From the single Come fiori dedicated to the boxer Johann Wilhelm Trollmann "Rukeli" is born the theathral show My Inv(f)erno... gypsy life, directed by Maurizio Vacca, illustrated by the cartoonist Valerio Pastore, that opens the X edition of the International TeatroLab Festival at the Tagliavini theater in Novellara in March 2019.

=== The return of C.F.F. e il Nomade Venerabile (2019) ===
In July 2019 C.F.F. e il Nomade Venerabile celebrate the twentieth anniversary by playing at the XX edition of the Giovinazzo Rock Festival with Diaframma and Zola Blood and with the release of the best of album DiVenti, presented during the radio broadcast Sonoricamente of Radio Koper on February 13, 2019 and during the radio broadcast Night Toys of Radio Città Aperta (Rome). Some songs taken from the concert of the twentieth anniversary made at the Garage Sound Live Club in Bari on December 28, 2019 were programmed by RAI Radio Live.

On 15 March 2021, the album E sia was released. All the titles and lyrics of the songs are taken from the homonymous collection of the poet Grazia Procino. In one of the songs, La veglia, there is the participation of Andrea Chimenti. The publication is anticipated by a special in La Gazzetta del Mezzogiorno of 2 March 2021 and by an article in La Repubblica of 13 March 2021. For the precise choice of the group, the songs are not present on the web but are programmed only by the radio.

In December 2023 the record label NOS Records releases Stagioni. Tributo ai Massimo Volume to which C.F.F. e il Nomade Venerabile participate with the song Fred taken from Il nuotatore.

== Current members ==
- Vanni La Guardia - bass, voice (1999–present)
- Anna Maria Stasi - voice, scenography (2002–present)
- Anna Surico - guitars, synthesizers (2003–present)
- Guido Lioi - drums (2019–present)

== Past members ==
- Nicola Liuzzi - drums (1999–2010)
- Monica Notarnicola - keyboards (2002–2010)
- Anna Moscatelli - theater-dance (2006–2010)
- Fabrizio Lavegas - guitars, keyboards (2008–2013)
- Carmela Milano - theater-dance (2002–2006)
- Pasquale Paradiso (Nomade) - theatre, voice (1999–2002)
- Filippo De Bellis (Venerabile) - theatre, voice (1999–2000)
- Lorenzo Velle - drums (2011–2013)

== Discography ==
=== Album ===
- 2004 – Ghiaccio
- 2006 – Circostanze
- 2009 – Lucidinervi
- 2013 – Attraverso
- 2015 – Canti notturni
- 2021 – E sia

=== EP ===
- 2014 – Al cuore

=== Compilation albums ===
- 2019 – DiVenti
