= Litfiba 3 =

Studio album by Litfiba
- Released: 1988
- Genres: New wave, rock
- Length: 45:24
- Labels: I.R.A. Records; CGD (reprints)

Litfiba chronology
Live 12-5-87 (Aprite i vostri occhi) (1987)	Litfiba 3 (1988)	Pirata (1989)

Litfiba 3 is the third studio album by the Italian rock band Litfiba. It ends the "Trilogy of power" started with the first album Desaparecido. It is the last album on which new wave influences can be heard.

Lyrics deal much with social and political criticism. "Louisiana" is about death sentence, through the story of Willie Jasper Darden (depicted in the cover), a citizen who was sentenced even though it existed strong doubts about his guilt. "Santiago" is about Pope John Paul II's visit to Chilean dictator Augusto Pinochet. "Tex" is about the genocide of Native Americans, with its title referencing popular Italian comic book series Tex: the song features western sounds, as it happens on other Litfiba songs (e.g. their single "Il mio corpo che cambia", from their album Infinito). "Paname" is a song about the protests against war in France, with lyrics in Italian and French referencing the Paris Carnival ("Paname" is in fact the French nickname of Paris). The song "Cuore di vetro" has been described as "the first Italian grunge song".

== Track listing ==
1. "Santiago" – 3:38
2. "Amigo" – 3:20
3. "Louisiana" – 5:32
4. "Ci sei solo tu" – 4:58
5. "Paname" – 4:57
6. "Cuore di vetro" – 4:55
7. "Tex" – 3:33
8. "Peste" – 5:30
9. "Corri" – 3:49
10. "Bambino" – 5:16

Some editions for export outside Italy also contains 5 live bonus tracks and a different front cover:
11. "Come un dio" – 8:05
12. "Resta" – 3:00
13. "Apapaia" – 4:59
14. "Re del silenzio" – 5:21
15. "Tziganata" – 4:35

== Personnel ==
- Piero Pelù – Vocals
- Ghigo Renzulli – Guitars
- Ringo de Palma – Drums
- Antonio Aiazzi – Keyboards
- Gianni Maroccolo – Bass
- Candelo Cabezas – Percussions
- Francesco Magnelli – Piano
- Guido Guidoboni – Harmonica
- Francesca Mariotti – Castanets
- Daniele Trambusti – Percussions

== Certifications and sales ==
Region	Certification	Certified units/sales
Italy sales 1988-1989	—	40,000
