= Piero Pelù =

Italian singer and songwriter (born 1962)

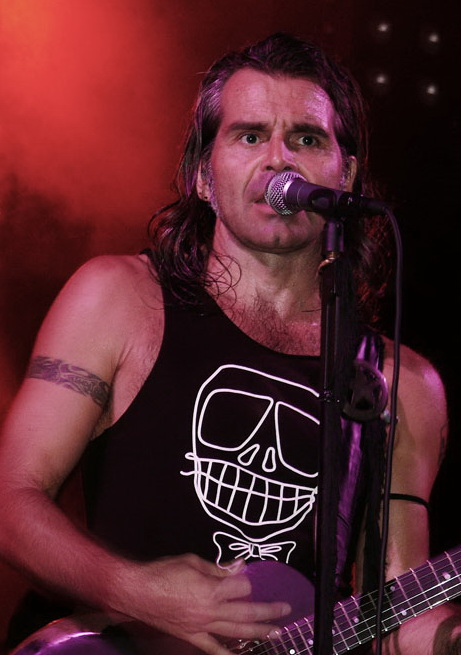

Background information
- Born: 10 February 1962 (age 64); Florence, Italy
- Genres: Rock; alternative rock; grunge; post-punk; new wave
- Occupations: Singer; songwriter; guitarist
- Years active: 1980–present
- Label: Sony BMG
- Member of: Litfiba
- Website: www.pieropelu.net

Pietro "Piero" Pelù (Italian pronunciation: [ˈpjɛːro peˈlu]; born 10 February 1962) is an Italian singer-songwriter. One of the most popular artists of the Italian rock scene, he is known for being the lead singer and co-founder of the band Litfiba, as well as for his solo activity. He is also known for his social and political commitment.

== Career ==
=== Litfiba ===
Piero co-founded Litfiba in his native Florence in 1980. The band started out mainly as a new wave and post-punk act, and their sound gradually evolved towards hard rock, while incorporating elements of latin rock and worldbeat. In the late 1990s, the sound shifted more towards alternative rock and the band later leaned towards a softer pop rock sound.

In July 1999, Piero decided to leave Litfiba due to personal contrasts with guitarist Ghigo Renzulli, with all the remaining members of the band following him. Renzulli retained the band's name and continued to release material under the name "Litfiba" with new members.

=== Solo career ===
In summer 1999, while still touring with Litfiba, Piero joined forces with fellow Italian artists Ligabue and Jovanotti to record the anti-war charity single "Il mio nome è mai più". The project was born in reaction to the Yugoslav wars, particularly to the Operation Allied Force carried out by the US during the Kosovo war. The artists released the song under the name LigaJovaPelù. The sales provent was donated to Emergency, chiefly for its campaigns in Afghanistan, Cambodia, former Yugoslavia and Sierra Leone. The single was very successful and resulted to be the best-selling single of 1999 in Italy, being certified 10-times platinum.

In 2000 Pelù released his first solo album Né buoni né cattivi. The album achieved great success, topping the Italian charts; it contained some of his solo best-known songs, such as "Io ci sarò", "Toro loco" and "Bomba Boomerang". "Io ci sarò" is the first solo single by Pelù: it debuted at #1 in the Italian best-selling singles chart. "Toro loco" will also be remixed by fellow Italian dance group Eiffel 65.

In 2002 Pelù released his second album U.D.S. - L'uomo della strada: this album will also reach the first position in the Italian charts, being certified platinum. The album featured "L'amore immaginato", a duet with the Indonesian popstar Anggun: this is one of the greatest hits in Pelù's solo career. Released as a single in 2003, it peaked at No. 1 in the Italian airplay charts.

In 2004 Pelù released his third studio album, Soggetti smarriti: this album closes the so-called trilogia dei sopravvissuti ("survivor trilogy"). A popular single from this record is "Prendimi così". On 2 July 2005, Pelù participated in the Italian edition of Live 8, a benefit concert supporting debt relief for the developing countries: the gig was held at the Circo Massimo, in Rome.

In 2006 Piero released his fourth solo album In faccia: the album marks Pelù's return to a more rock-oriented sound, well represented by the hard rock lead single "Tribù", presented for the first time at the 1st May Concert in Rome. In 2007, he released Fenomeni: this would be Piero's last solo album before his return with Litfiba.

In 2009 Piero participated in "Domani 21/04.09", a collaborative charity single released by the supergroup Artisti Uniti per l'Abruzzo in 2009. The project supported the victims of the 2009 L'Aquila earthquake.

=== Return to Litfiba, disbanding and solo projects ===
In 2009 the official website announced Piero Pelù's return as the lead singer of Litfiba. The band embarked on a long tour and some of the songs played during the new concerts would form the new live album Stato libero di Litfiba, released in 2010. The reunion album would be very successful, being certified platinum; it also featured two new singles, "Sole nero" and "Barcollo". The success would be repeated by the two following studio albums, Grande nazione (2012) and Eutòpia (2016).

In 2013 he appeared as one of the four coaches on the talent show The Voice of Italy; in the initial phase of the programme, he chose Cristiano Godano of Marlene Kuntz as his artistic consultant. He returned as a coach in the 2014 edition.

Also in 2013 his compilation album Identikit was released: it featured the new singles "Mille uragani" and "Sto rock".

In 2015 he released "Buchi nell'acqua", a collaborative single with Federico Fiumani of Diaframma, another band of the new wave/post-punk scene which had emerged parallelly to Litfiba.

In 2019 he made an appearance in the Italian comedy film L'agenzia dei bugiardi.

He participated at the Sanremo Music Festival 2020 with the song "Gigante", dedicated to his grandson Rocco (born in 2017), the son of his daughter Greta; he placed fifth. It was his first ever participation at Sanremo as a contestant (he had taken part to the kermesse twice before, as a guest star).

In the same year he released his sixth studio album, Pugili fragili, peaking at #4 in the album chart and at #3 in the vinyl chart.

In 2022 Litfiba announced they would do one last tour, and then they disbanded; however, the members of the band declared that a new reunion is not to be excluded.

== Personal life and views ==
Piero has three daughters from different women: from his relation with Rosella he had Greta (b. 1990) and Linda (b. 1995), whilst with his second partner Antonella Bundu he had Zoe (b. 2004). In 2017, Greta has become the mother of Rocco. On 14 september 2019 he married pianist and conductress Gianna Fratta in Florence.

Piero Pelù has been actively involved in social work since he was very young. He has always defined himself a pacifist and a conscientious objector. Many of his songs express anti-war views, such as "Il mio nome è mai più" and "Bomba Boomerang", and anti-militarist positions, as we can hear on "Prima guardia" (from Terremoto). Some of his songs also stand against mafia, such as the single "Maria Coraggio" (from Eutòpia), dedicated to the mafia victim Lea Garofalo. He has also taken position against drugs, as in "Proibito" (also from Terremoto).

In September 1986, on the fourth anniversary of the assassination of General Carlo Alberto Dalla Chiesa, he worked personally in the organization of the concert against mafia La musica contro il silenzio, held in Piazza Politeama in Palermo, which in addition to Litfiba saw the participation of other Italian alternative bands of that period (Gaznevada, Moda, Denovo, Diaframma, Detonazione and Joe Perrino & The Mellowtones).

In September 1991, again with Litfiba, he participated in the Trieste-Sarajevo peace march, a caravan of pacifist associations in contrast to the imminent Balkan War, which ended in Sarajevo with a concert of fellow Italian band I Nomadi.

In 1996 with his then partner he went to Sierra Leone, where the civil war was underway, giving life to the Sierra Leone Project in collaboration with the missionaries of Murialdo and Emergency, for the construction of hospitals for children victims of mutilations.

In December 1997 he was part of the group of artists composed by Luciano Pavarotti, Bono, Brian Eno, Zucchero Fornaciari, Ligabue, Jovanotti, Edoardo Bennato and The Chieftains, who went to Mostar for the inauguration of the Pavarotti Music Center, a structure created with War Child to educate children who are victims of war in music. The school was built with funds raised through the 1995 (in which Litfiba took part) and 1996 editions of Pavarotti & Friends.

== Discography ==
=== Litfiba ===
- Guerra (1982)
- Luna/La preda (1983)
- Eneide di Krypton (1983)
- Yassassin (1984, EP)
- Desaparecido (1985)
- Transea (1986)
- 17 RE (1986)
- Live 12-5-87 (Aprite i vostri occhi) (1987, live)
- Litfiba 3 (1988)
- Pirata (1989)
- El Diablo (1990)
- Sogno ribelle (1992)
- Terremoto (1993)
- Colpo di coda (1994)
- Spirito (1994)
- Lacio drom (Buon viaggio) (1995, live)
- Mondi sommersi (1997)
- Croce e delizia (1998)
- Infinito (1999)
- Litfiba Live '99 (2005, live)
- Stato libero di Litfiba (2010 live album +2 songs unpublished)
- Grande nazione (2012)
- Trilogia 1983-1989 live 2013 (2013, live)

=== Solo ===
- Né buoni né cattivi (2000)
- U.D.S. - L'uomo della strada (2002)
- Soggetti smarriti (2004)
- Presente (2005)
- In faccia (2006)
- Storytellers (2007)
- Fenomeni (2008)
- Identikit (2013)
- Pugili fragili (2020)
- Deserti (2024)

== Bibliography ==
- Perfetto difettoso (Arnoldo Mondadori Editore, 2000) ISBN 88-04-48691-0
- Identikit di un ribelle, (Rizzoli Editore, 2014)
