= Carlo Bizzaccheri =

Italian architect

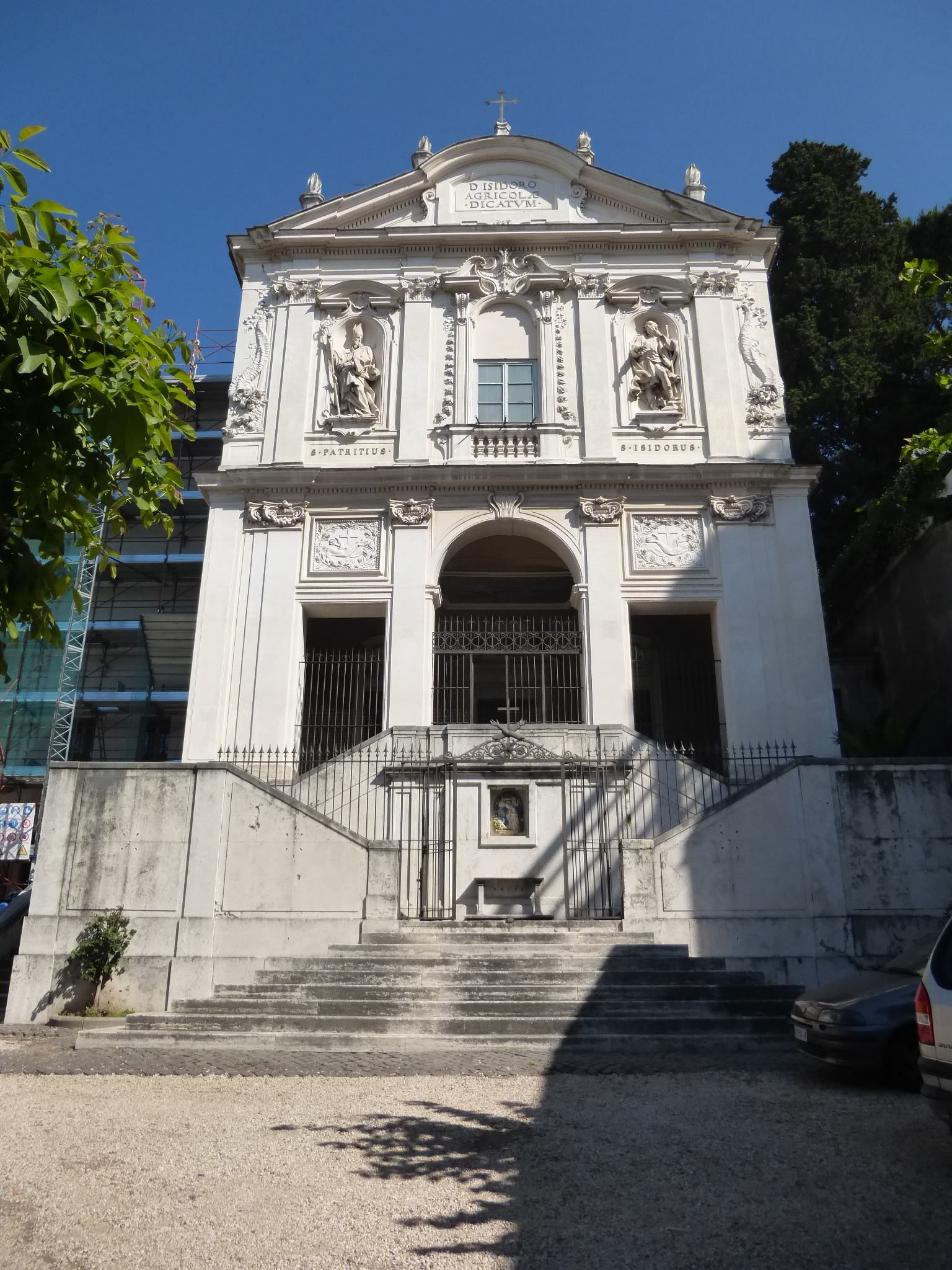
Facade of Sant’Isidoro a Capo le Case, 1704-05

Carlo Francesco Bizzaccheri (13 April 1655 – 11 February 1721) was an Italian architect. He worked in a Baroque and early Rococo style.

== Biography ==
Born in Rome on 13 April 1655, Bizzaccheri trained under the architect Carlo Fontana and possibly also under Carlo Rainaldi. In 1684 he became a member of the Accademia dei Virtuosi al Pantheon, 1712 its "Reggente". He was also a member of the Accademia di San Luca from 1697.

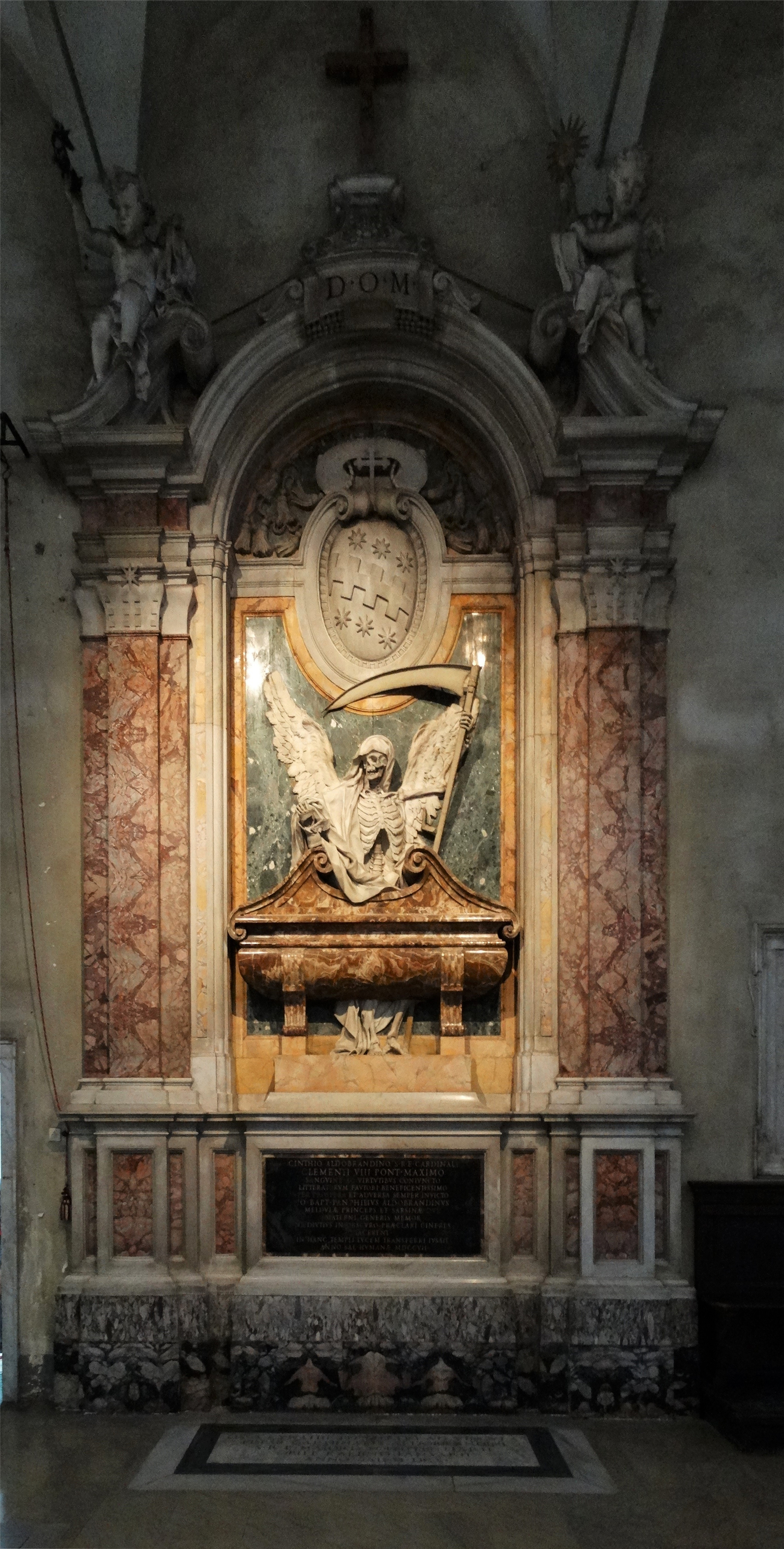
Tomb of Cardinal Cinzio Aldobrandini, 1705–1707, by Bizzaccheri and sculpture by Pierre Le Gros the Younger, Rome, San Pietro in Vincoli

As house architect of prince Giovanni Battista Pamphili Aldobrandini, he built the entrance gate and garden wall of the Villa Aldobrandini in Frascati, accomplished in 1693. He also designed the tomb monument erected by the prince from 1705–07 to his ancestor Cardinal Cinzio Aldobrandini in San Pietro in Vincoli. The sculpture of a winged skeleton and a pair of putti on this monument are by Pierre Le Gros the Younger.

From 1695 he succeeded Giovanni Antonio de' Rossi as architect of the Monte di Pietà in Rome and finished the work on its chapel by 1700 where the dome is decorated to his design. 1700-02 he added the chapel's vestibule.

From 1709-12 Bizzaccheri was the architect of the Palazzo di San Luigi dei Francesi in Rome and from 1712-19 he worked for the Tribunale delle Strade. He was also until 1715 the architect for the cathedral of Orte, a town where also extended the palace of Cardinal Nuzzi.

Bizzaccheri was never assigned any major tasks but nevertheless played an important role in the transformation of the borrominesque vocabulary into the language of Roman rococo. This is exemplified by the facade of Sant’Isidoro a Capo le Case, his most distinguished work, which he constructed from 1704-05 using the extant staircase and portico. He was very much at the forefront of stylistic change and anticipated later tastes as is demonstrated by his completion of the Cappella di San Nicola di Bari, financed by Paolo Girolamo della Torre, in Santa Maria Maddalena. The chapel was begun by Mattia de Rossi in 1690 and finished by Bizzaccheri from 1694–96 in tones that would determine the colour scheme of the rest of the church in the mid-18th century.

In 1715 he designed the Fountain of the Tritons in the Piazza Bocca della Verità. Bizzaccheri died in Rome on 11 February 1721, aged 65.

== Other works ==
- Chapel of Sant'Anna, Santa Maria in Montesanto, Roma. (1679)
- Convent of Santa Maria Maddalena, Rome (c. 1680)
- Chapel of Sant'Antonio di Padova, San Isidoro, Rome (1681)
- Convent of San Lorenzo in Lucina (1690)
- Memorial to the Principessa Flavia Bonelli, Chapel of the Madonna del Divino Aiuto (1691)
- Gemstone ciborium, altar of the Chapel of the Crucifix in San Marcello al Corso (1691)
- Campanile of San Marcello (minor work, late 17th century)
- Convent of San Basilio (minor work, late 17th century)
- Palazzo Aragona Gonzaga (1701) addition of an upper floor.

== Gallery ==
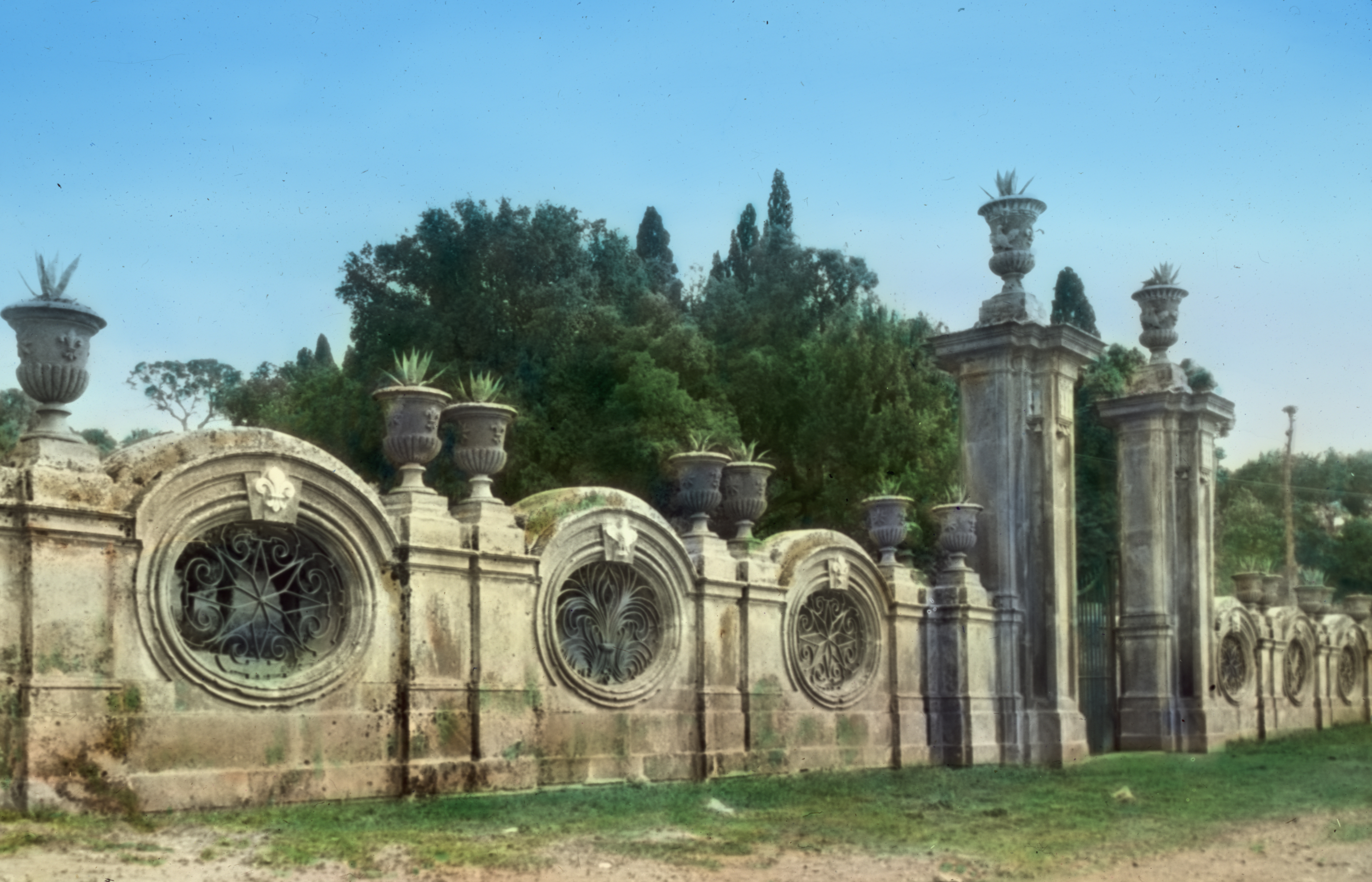
Gate and garden wall, Villa Aldobrandini, Frascati, 1693

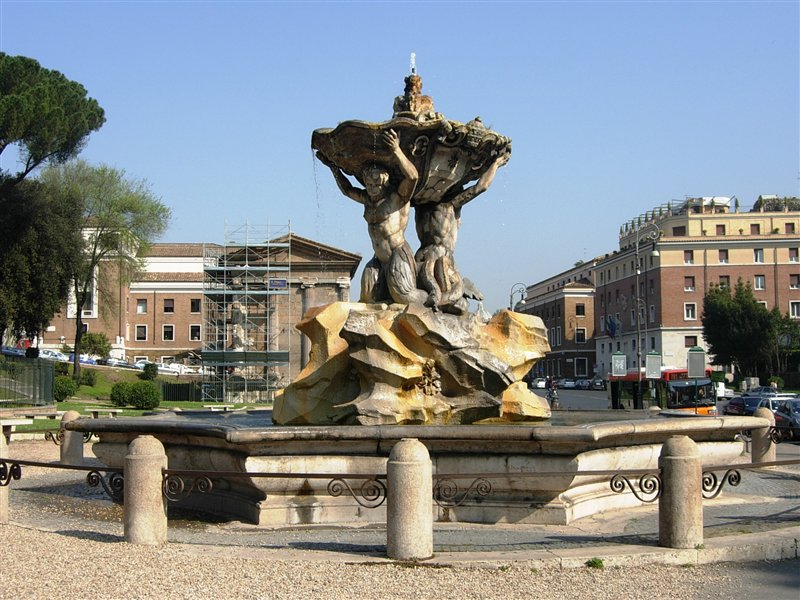
Fountain on the Piazza della Bocca della Verità
