= Terremoto =

Studio album by Litfiba
- Released: January 1993
- Genre: Hard rock
- Length: 41:45
- Label: CGD
- Producer: Alberto Pirelli

Litfiba chronology
Sogno ribelle (1992)	Terremoto (1993)	Colpo di coda (1994)

Terremoto (Italian: Earthquake) is the fifth studio album by the Italian rock band Litfiba. It is the second chapter of the "tetralogy of elements", started on El Diablo. It is dedicated to earth. It was produced by Alberto Pirelli. It is considered one of their most hard rock albums, with many songs featuring socially and politically charged lyrics. It sold over 700,000 copies.

== Track listing ==
1. "Dimmi il nome" – 3:41
2. "Maudit" – 4:54
3. "Fata Morgana" – 5:13
4. "Soldi" – 3:49
5. "Firenze sogna" – 4:38
6. "Dinosauro" – 3:47
7. "Prima guardia" – 4:56
8. "Il mistero di Giulia" – 5:57
9. "Sotto il vulcano" – 4:50

== Personnel ==
- Piero Pelù – vocals
- Roberto Terzani – bass
- Federico Renzulli – guitars
- Antonio Aiazzi – keyboards
- Franco Caforio – drums
- Fabrizio Simoncioni – recording and mixing
- Alberto Pirelli – producer

== Charts ==
Chart (1993)	Peak position
Europe (European Top 100 Albums)	33
Italy (Discografia internazionale)	2
Italy (Musica e dischi)	1
Switzerland (Schweizer Hitparade)	28
