= Sir Galba =

- Small Island Pride, King Sparrow (Mighty Sparrow) and Sir Galba, mid-1950s

Background information
- Born: George Brindsley McSween; 1919; Grenada
- Died: 18 September 1957 Trinidad
- Occupation: Calypsonian
- Years active: 1946–1957
- Labels: Sagomes, Vitadisk

George Brindsley McSween (1919 – September 18, 1957), known as Sir Galba, was a Grenada-born calypso singer and recording artist in the 1940s and 1950s.

He was born George Brindsley McSween in the village of Birchgrove, St. Andrews, Grenada, in 1919. A troubled man, he had a relatively brief career and life, but Galba is remembered for his outstanding calypsos and contributions to the development of the calypso scene in Trinidad. He stabbed someone in a nightclub in 1952 and five years later, after stabbing his girlfriend, he committed suicide on 18 September 1957.

== Career ==
It is not known why he took the calypsonian name of "Sir Galba." Perhaps he named himself after the Roman Emperor Servius Sulpicius Galba (3 BCE-CE 69) who only reigned for seven months from 8 June 68, until he was assassinated on 7 January 69. On the other hand, he could have been named after the galba tree Calophyllum antillanum which is noted for its hard wood and was a favourite for making spinning tops. "Galba could also have been named for his skill with women: a man who can "pitch galba" is skilled in delivering sexual pleasure to women."

After developing his calypso career in Trinidad, Sir Galba performed at a number of shows in Grenada in 1945 in St George's, at the Eastern Theatre in Grenville and at the Spencer Gordon Hall in Paradise, featuring fellow calypsonians Small Island Pride (Theophilius Woods), The Mighty Zebra (Charles Harris), Lord Pretender, Lord Kitchener and Lord Ziegfield (Percy Simon).

Along with fellow Grenadians Small Island Pride and Zebra, Galba made a big impact on the Trinidad calypso scene after World War II, laying the groundwork for the arrival of the Mighty Sparrow, who entered the Trinidad Calypso scene in 1954 after migrating from Grenada to Trinidad 17 years earlier as a 2-year-old in 1937.

Sir Galba became one of Trinidad's leading successful calypsonians soon after World War II, along with such greats as Kitchener, Killer, Melody, Spoiler, Viking, Zebra, Dictator, Terror, Wonder and others.

== Compositions ==
- "Irene", which he sang in the Young Brigade Tent during the 1951 Calypso campaigns, was obviously based on the American traditional folksong "Goodbye Irene," made popular by the Weavers' 1950 version. The words to this calypso may be found at
- "Hooligans Hide Yourself"
- "Too Many Fires" recorded on a Sagomes 78 rpm disk produced in England in 1952 with Mighty Skipper singing "Talking Parrot" on the flip side.
- "Put the Knife on the Shelf"
- "Calypsonian from Toco" (Recorded in 1949)
- "Residents of Nowhere Square" (Recorded in 1949)
- "Man in the Garden Hiding" for which he was crowned Calypso King of 1952.
- "I Don't Want Any Women Police in Trinidad"
- "The Queen at Montego Bay" - He received second place for this song in an inter-island calypso contest at the Governor's House, Port of Spain, for Princess Margaret in 1955. The other five calypsonians who were chosen to sing were Lord Melody, Mighty Dictator, Mighty Spitfire, Mighty Panther, and Lord Viper.
- "Mr. Christine from Barbados" in 1954 on 78 rpm Vitadisc TC 106 with "Boys Days" by the She She Calypso Band on the flip side.
- "Bajan Diplomat." On a Vitadisc 45 rpm with a steelband playing "The Happy Wanderer" on the flip side. This recording was made some time after the movie Three Coins In the Fountain (1954), starring Clifton Webb and Dorothy McGuire.

Sir Galba was noted for his clever and humorous lyrics, although few have survived. But the calypso, the "Bajan Diplomat", taken from a recording, gives some idea of his playfulness. The calypso is partly a play on the lyrics of the popular song from the 1954 film, Three Coins in a Fountain, but mostly a humorous dig at Trinidadians and Barbadians, especially sending up the broad Barbadian accent and playing on the common West Indian myth that Barbadians were often con artists. An MP3 version may be downloaded from:
