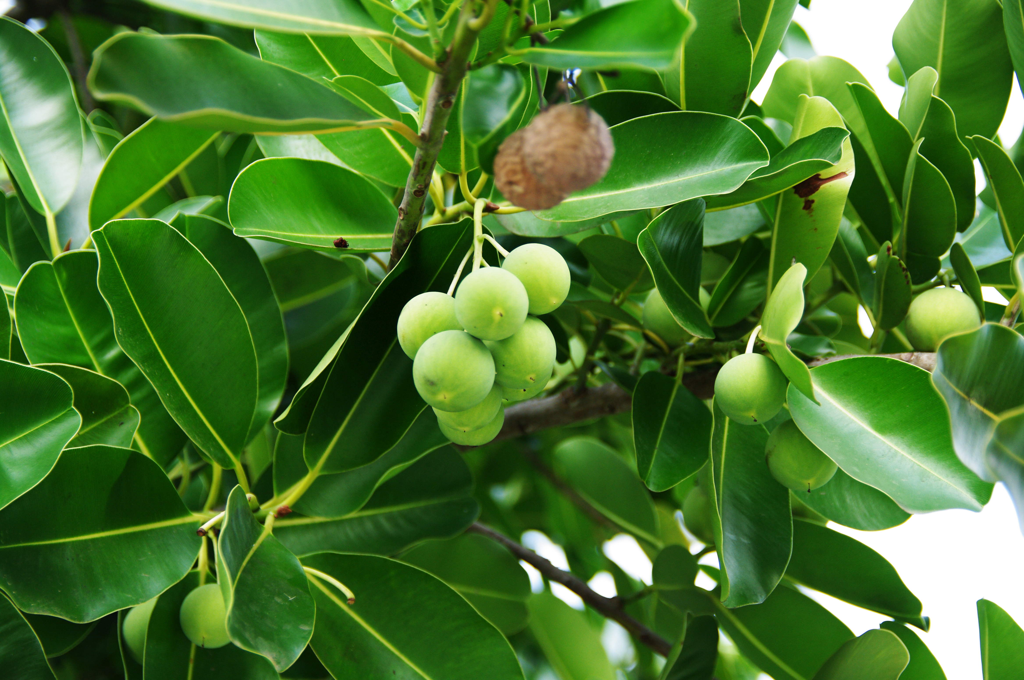

Conservation status
- Secure (NatureServe)

Scientific classification
- Kingdom: Plantae
- Clade: Tracheophytes
- Clade: Angiosperms
- Clade: Eudicots
- Clade: Rosids
- Order: Malpighiales
- Family: Calophyllaceae
- Genus: Calophyllum
- Species: C. antillanum

Binomial name
- Calophyllum antillanum Britton

= Calophyllum antillanum =

Species of flowering plant

Calophyllum antillanum is an evergreen, medium-sized tropical tree in the Calophyllaceae family. It is also known as Antilles beauty leaf, Antilles calophyllum, Alexandrian laurel, Galba, Santa Maria, mast wood, and West Indian laurel.

Galba, its common name in Trinidad, may have been the origin of the stage name of Grenadian-born calypsonian, Sir Galba.

== Uses ==
It is prized for producing a very hard, durable wood. The leaves were once used as a diuretic in Grenada, but it is said in Dominica to be poisonous (Politi, 1996). It is considered an invasive weed species in some areas.

The wood of this tree is widely used in the tropics. The heartwood varies from yellowish pink through reddish brown while sapwood is generally lighter in color. The grain is usually interlocked, and the specific gravity ranges from 0.51 to 0.57. The wood is fairly easy to work, rating above average in shaping, sanding, and mortising, and below average in planing, turning, and boring. It is moderately difficult to air-season and shows moderate to severe warp. The sapwood is easily impregnated with preservatives by either pressure or open-tank-bath methods, but the heartwood is extremely resistant to impregnation.

Its wood is suitable for general construction, flooring, bridge construction, furniture, boat construction, cabinetmaking, shingles, interior construction, agricultural implements, poles, crossties, and handles. It is a good general utility wood where a fairly strong and moderately durable timber is required. In British Honduras, it was substituted for imported creosoted sleepers but required replacement after 3 or 4 years. In Mexico, attempts to use the timber in the veneer and plywood industry were not entirely successful.

The tree is also planted for shade along streets and as a windbreak or to protect against salt spray near the ocean. Frequently it is pruned to form a dense hedge along property lines in urban areas.

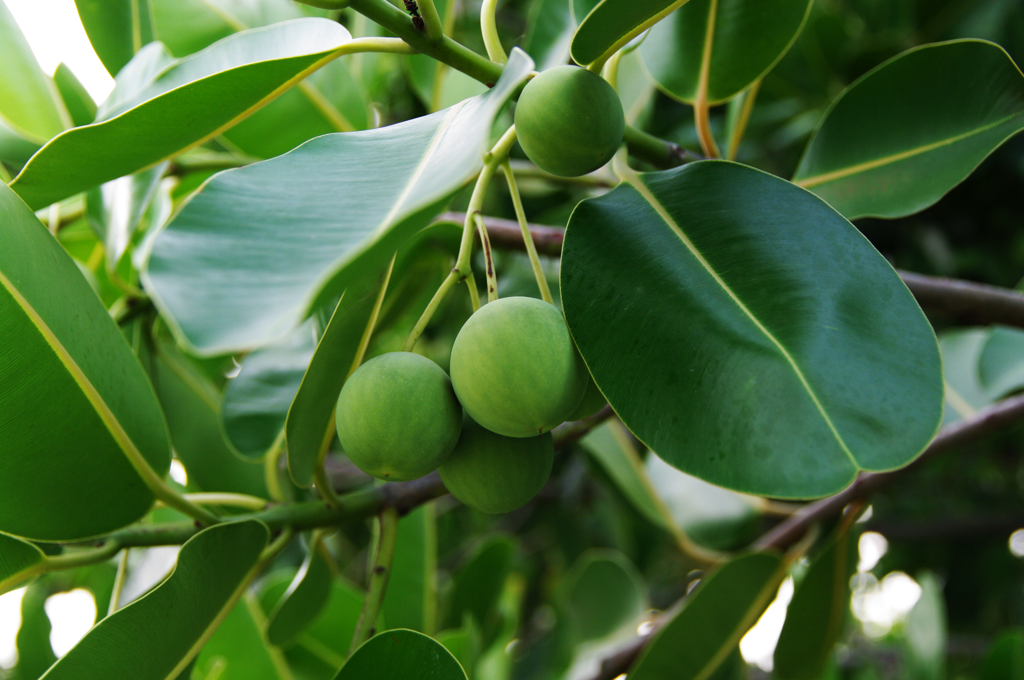
Palo María in San Juan, Puerto Rico

The latex from the trunk has been employed medicinally. The fruits are used as hog-feed, and lamp oil is extracted from the seeds.

The tree's adaptability to a variety of sites in Puerto Rico has made it popular among soil scientists and foresters for rehabilitation of degraded lands.

== Distribution ==
It is native to the Caribbean region, including Antigua and Barbuda, Barbados, Cuba, Dominica, Grenada, Guadeloupe, Hispaniola (both the Dominican Republic and Haiti), Jamaica, Martinique, Montserrat, Puerto Rico, St. Lucia, St. Vincent and the Grenadines, Trinidad and Tobago, and the U.S. Virgin Islands (in St. Croix). It has also been introduced to Florida and Hawaii in the United States. In Trinidad, it was used to make spinning tops for children. It has also been reported from Costa Rica, Colombia, Mexico, El Salvador, Ecuador, and Paraguay, etc.
