= Stato libero di Litfiba =

Live album by Litfiba
- Released: 1 June 2010
- Venue: Florence
- Genre: Rock, hard rock
- Length: 2:18:15
- Label: Sony Music

Litfiba chronology
Five on Line (2009)	Stato libero di Litfiba (2010)	Grande nazione (2012)

Stato libero di Litfiba (Italian: Free State of Litfiba) is a 2010 double live album by the Italian rock band Litfiba. The album marks the return of lead singer Piero Pelù to the band, which he had left in 1999.
The album was recorded in two dates, on 16 and 17 April, in Florence, during the 2010 reunion tour. It also contains two previously unreleased tracks: "Sole nero" and "Barcollo", both released as singles. Stato libero di Litfiba was welcomed with great favour by the audience and has been certified platinum in Italy.

== Track listing ==
=== CD 1 ===
1. "Sole nero" – 4:00 (previously unreleased)
2. "Barcollo" – 4:00 (previously unreleased)
3. "Proibito" – 6:24
4. "Resta" – 3:21
5. "Cangaçeiro" – 5:27
6. "Paname" – 7:02
7. "Bambino" – 5:16
8. "Il volo" – 4:39
9. "Sparami" – 4:51
10. "Lulù & Marlene" – 5:00
11. "Dio" – 4:39
12. "Spirito" – 5:30
13. "Tex" – 5:17
14. "Ferito" – 8:13

=== CD 2 ===
1. "Fata Morgana" – 7:22
2. "Animale Di Zona" – 5:00
3. "A denti stretti" – 4:00
4. "Cuore Di Vetro" – 4:44
5. "Gioconda" – 6:21
6. "Ritmo 2 #" – 5:36
7. "Ci Sei Solo Tu" – 5:14
8. "Maudit" – 5:05
9. "Dimmi Il Nome" – 3:50
10. "El diablo" – 5:58
11. "Lacio Drom" – 5:11
12. "Lo spettacolo" – 6:15

== Singles ==
Two singles were released from the album: the first one, "Sole nero", anticipated the release of the album and reached #10 on the Italian singles chart. The following single was "Barcollo".

== Personnel ==
- Piero Pelù - vocals
- Ghigo Renzulli - guitar
- Daniele Bagni - bass guitar
- Federico Sagona - keyboards
- Pino Fidanza – drums

== Charts ==
=== Weekly charts ===
Chart (2010)	Highest position
Italy	2

=== Year-end charts ===
Chart (2010)	Position
Italy	28
