= Spirito =

Studio album by Litfiba
- Released: 1994
- Genre: Alternative rock, worldbeat, latin rock, grunge
- Length: 45:03
- Label: EMI
- Producer: Rick Parashar; Litfiba

Litfiba chronology
Colpo di coda (1994)	Spirito (1994)	Mondi sommersi (1997)

Spirito (Italian: Spirit) is the sixth studio album by the Italian rock band Litfiba. It is the third chapter of the "Tetralogy of elements", dedicated to air.

== Track listing ==
1. "Lo spettacolo" – 4:10
2. "Animale di zona" – 4:36
3. "Spirito" – 4:41
4. "La musica fa" – 5:12
5. "Tammùria" – 4:10
6. "Lacio drom (Buon viaggio)" – 4:12
7. "No frontiere" – 5:15
8. "Diavolo illuso" – 4:27
9. "Telephone blues" – 1:03
10. "Ora d'aria" – 5:07
11. "Suona fratello" – 2:10

== Personnel ==
- Piero Pelù – vocals
- Daniele Bagni – bass
- Federico Renzulli – guitars
- Antonio Aiazzi – keyboards, marimba
- Franco Caforio – drums
- Candelo Cabezas – percussion

Produced by Rick Parashar and Litfiba

== Charts ==
Chart (1994)	Peak position
Italian Albums (Musica e dischi)	3
