= Grande nazione =

Studio album by Litfiba
- Released: 2012
- Genres: Alternative rock, hard rock
- Length: 43:25
- Label: Sony Music

Litfiba chronology
Stato libero di Litfiba (2010)	Grande nazione (2012)	Trilogia 1983–1989 live 2013 (2013)

Grande nazione is the twelfth studio album by the Italian rock band Litfiba, released in 2012. The album achieved great success and has been certified gold in Italy.

== Track listing ==
All tracks are written by Piero Pelù and Federico Renzulli.

1. "Fiesta tosta" – 4:00
2. "Squalo" – 4:17
3. "Elettrica" – 4:11
4. "Tra te e me" – 4:30
5. "Tutti buoni" – 3:50
6. "Luna dark" – 4:22
7. "Anarcoide" – 3:40
8. "Grande nazione" – 5:04
9. "Brado" – 4:34
10. "La mia valigia" – 4:57

Bonus track

1. "Dimmi dei nazi" – 6:41

== Personnel ==
- Piero Pelù – vocals
- Federico Renzulli – guitars
- Federico Sagona – keyboards
- Daniele Bagni – bass
- Pino Fidanza – drums

== Charts ==
=== Weekly charts ===
Chart (2012)	Peak position
Italian Albums (FIMI)	1
Swiss Albums (Schweizer Hitparade)	49

=== Year end charts ===
Chart (2012)	Position
Italy	36

== Certifications ==
Region	Certification	Certified units/sales
Italy (FIMI)	Gold	30,000^{*}
^{*} Sales figures based on certification alone.
