= Diaframma =

Italian band

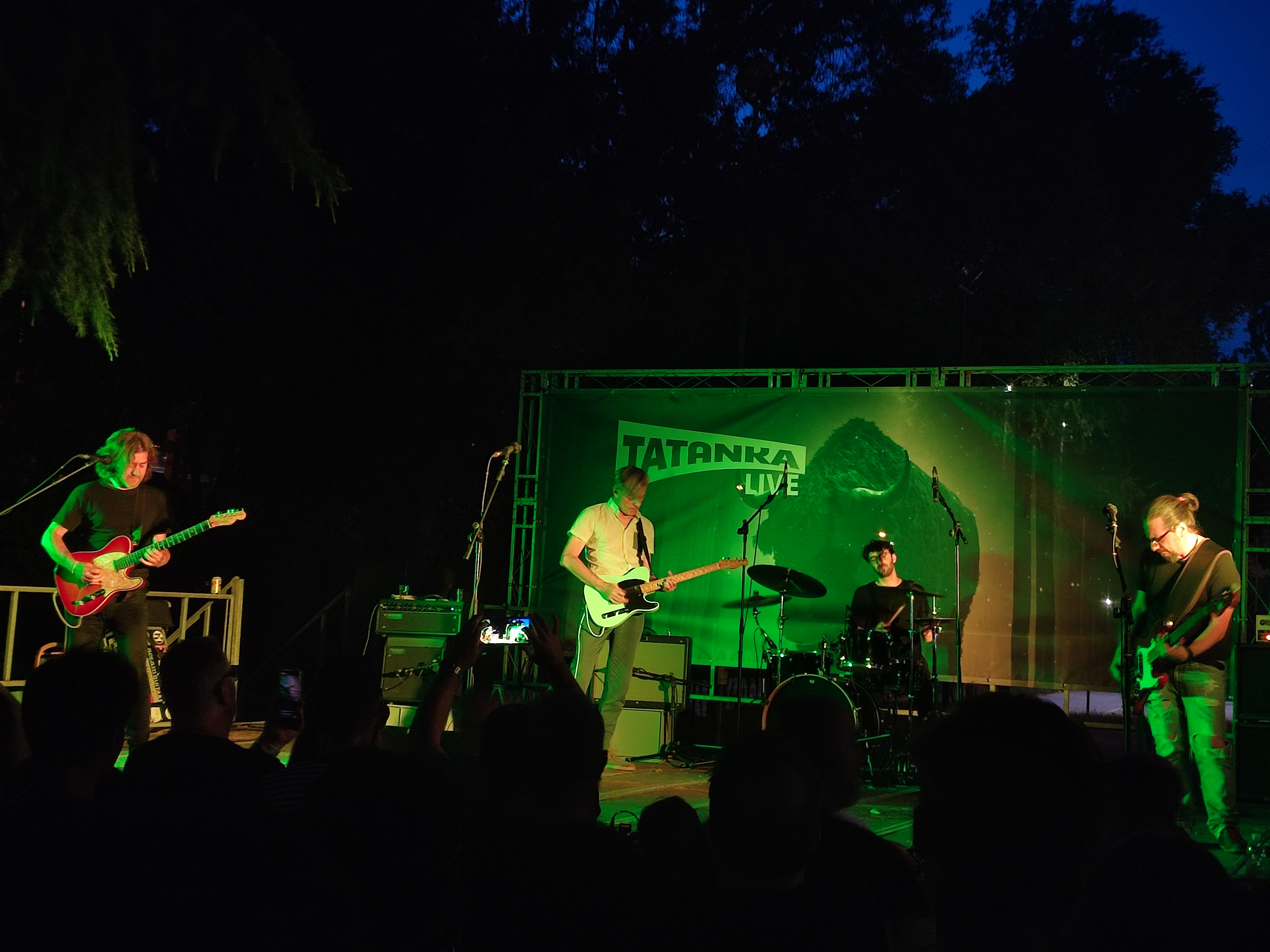
- Diaframma performing in Bologna, Emilia-Romagna, (2023).

Background information
- Origin: Florence, Tuscany, Italy
- Genres: Pop rock, dark wave (early), new wave, jangle pop (early), gothic rock (early), slacker rock, alternative rock, post-punk, punk rock
- Years active: 1979–present
- Labels: Abraxas, Dischi Ricordi, I.R.A., Italian, Contempo, Diaframma, Industrie Discografiche Lacerba
- Members: Federico Fiumani; Edoardo Daidone; Luca Cantasano; Leonardo Martera
- Past members: Nicola Vannini; Miro Sassolini; Daniele Trambusti; Simone Giuliani; Guido Melis; Alessandro Gerbi; Leandro Cicchi; Leandro Braccini; Massimo Bandinelli; Valter Poli; Marco Bachi; Riccardo Biliotti; Alessandro Guasconi; Andrea Ra; Lorenzo Alderighi; Gianni Cicchi; Alessandro Raimondi; Renzo Franchi; Fabio Provazza; Alessio Riccio; Pino Gulli; Lucio Signore; Gianni Cerone; Francesco Cerone; Lorenzo Moretto; Vieri Prati; Fabrizio Morganti; Vanni Breschi; Pino Gulli; Tancredi Lo Cigno; Riccardo Onori; Vanni Bartolini; Marco Morandi; Maurizio Fasolo; Ernesto De Pascale; Antonio Aiazzi; Mauro Sabbione; Francesco Magnelli; Alessandro Gherardi; Emilio Sapia; Francesco Renzoni; Fabio Marchiori; Gianluca De Rubertis; Enrico Gabrielli; Daniele Biagini
- Website: www.diaframma.org

Diaframma is an Italian band, one of the dark wave, gothic Italian acts to come out of Florence during the early 80s along with Litfiba. Diaframma originated from the meeting of punk - though it was starting to decline at the time -, new wave and rock.

== History ==
Leader and co-founder of Diaframma is the poet, singer, guitarist and author Federico Fiumani. Before Fiumani took the lead in 1989, the singer was Nicola Vannini, followed by Miro Sassolini, who recorded the first three Diaframma albums: Siberia, 3 Volte Lacrime and Boxe.

Starting from the initial darkwave sound, the style of Diaframma began to shift toward punk rock. Fiumani took the lead and became the singer of the band. Through changes in the line-up of Diaframma over the years, several well-known Italian rock musicians recorded and toured with the band: Daniele Trambusti (drums, already working with Litfiba, Avida, Bella Band and many other Italian rock acts of the 80s and 90s), Alessandro Gerbi (drums, already working with CCCP Fedeli alla linea), Gianni Cerone (drums), Alessio Riccio (drums), Simone Giuliani, now a record producer and film composer living in New York City (keyboards and vocals), Alessandro Gherardi (keyboards), Guido Melis (bass), Riccardo "Foggy" Biliotti (bass).

Diaframma reached the status of cult band because of charismatic leader Federico Fiumani's statements and fierce lyrics. Fiumani more than once turned down major label deals and declined to participate to mainstream events such as the Sanremo Music Festival in order to preserve his artistic independence and maintain Diaframma's integrity.

The Italian alternative rock band C.F.F. e il Nomade Venerabile has dedicated to the leader of Diaframma a song called Fiumani, from the album Ghiaccio, released in 2004.

== Discography ==
=== LP/CD ===
Year	Title
1984	Siberia
1986	Tre volte lacrime
1988	Boxe
1989	Diaframma 8183
1990	In perfetta solitudine
1991	Da Siberia al prossimo week-end
1992	Live and unreleased
1992	Anni luce
1994	Il ritorno dei desideri
1995	Non è tardi
1996	Sesso e violenza
1997	Albori 1979-83
1998	Scenari immaginari
1999	Coraggio da vendere
2000	Live al Rototom
2000	Canzoni perdute
2001	Il futuro sorride a quelli come noi
2002	Sassolini sul fondo del fiume
2002	I giorni dell'ira
2003	Electroboxe
2003	First recording
2004	Volume 13
2005	Passato presente
2007	Camminando sul lato selvaggio
2009	Difficile da trovare
2012	Niente di serio
2013	Preso nel vortice
2016	Siberia Reloaded 2016
2018	L'Abisso

=== Singles, EP ===
Year	Title
1982	Pioggia
1982	Corto Circuito
1983	Altrove
1985	Amsterdam - (Diaframma / Litfiba)
1986	Io ho in mente te
1989	Corri ragazzo
1989	Gennaio

=== Federico Fiumani album ===
Anno	Titolo
1994	Confidenziale
2006	Donne mie
