= Mondi sommersi =

Studio album by Litfiba
- Released: 1997
- Recorded: 1997
- Genre: Alternative rock
- Length: 48:25
- Label: EMI
- Producer: Ghigo Renzulli, Piero Pelù, Richard Guy

Litfiba chronology
Spirito (1994)	Mondi sommersi (1997)	Infinito (1999)

Mondi sommersi (Italian: Submerged worlds) is the seventh studio album by the Italian rock band Litfiba. It is the fourth chapter of the "Tetralogy of elements". It is dedicated to water. The album has sold 700,000 copies in Italy.

== Track listing ==
1. "Ritmo" – 4:13
2. "Imparerò" – 3:27
3. "Regina di Cuori" – 4:05
4. "Goccia a goccia" – 4:42
5. "Si può" – 4:34
6. "Ritmo #2" – 4:34
7. "L’esercito delle forchette" – 5:12
8. "Sparami" – 4:38
9. "Apri le tue porte" – 4:12
10. "Dottor M" – 5:05
11. "In fondo alla boccia" – 3:43

== Personnel ==
- Piero Pelù – vocals
- Daniele Bagni – bass
- Federico Renzulli – guitars
- Franco Caforio – drums
- Candelo Cabezas – percussions
- Roberto Terzani – programming

Produced by Ghigo Renzulli, Piero Pelù, Richard Guy

== Charts ==
=== Weekly charts ===
Chart (1997)	Highest position
Italy	1
Switzerland	39

=== Year-end charts ===
Chart (1997)	Position
Europe	80
Italy	8
