= Orte Cathedral =

Church in Italy

Coordinates: 42.460527°N 12.384978°E

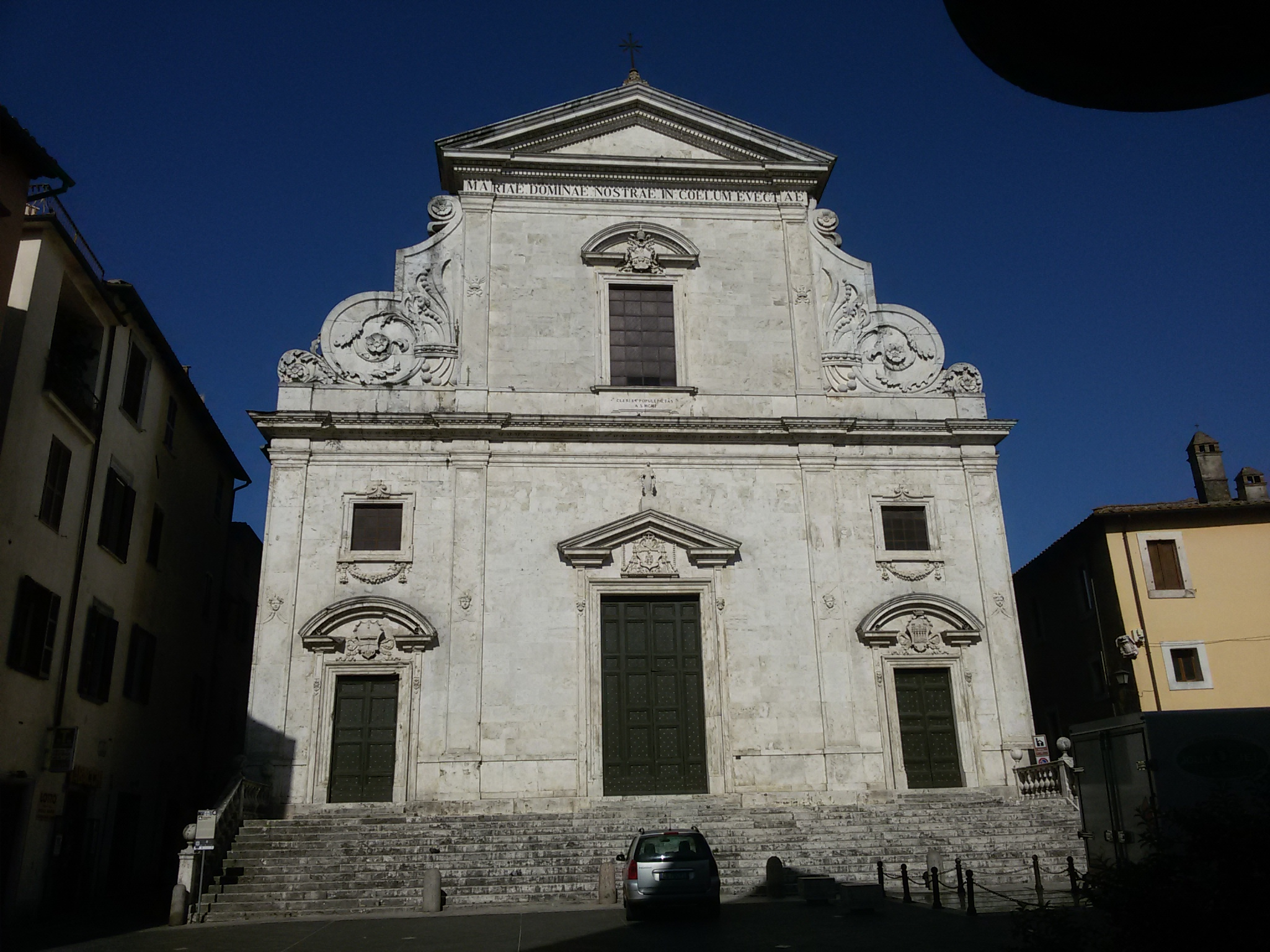
West front

Orte Cathedral or the Basilica of Santa Maria Assunta, Orte (Italian: Duomo di Orte; Basilica Concattedrale di Santa Maria Assunta), is the main Roman Catholic church of Orte, located in front of the Piazza della Libertà, in the province of Viterbo, region of Lazio, Italy. It is dedicated to the Assumption of the Virgin Mary. It was the episcopal seat of the bishops of Orte, which in 1437 was united aeque principaliter with the diocese of Civita Castellana, and merged into it in 1986; it is now a co-cathedral. It is an immemorial minor basilica.

== History ==
A church existed on the site by the 9th century. By the 18th century, despite some refurbishments, it was in need of reconstruction. In 1721, the church was reconsecrated after bring rebuilt by the architects Castrachini and Bizzacchero, maintaining the same layout, with a nave in a late-Baroque style. The single nave is flanked by solid rows of pilasters leading to a crossing topped by a small dome, and a semicircular apse. The white marble west front with decorative volutes was added in 1898 - 1901.

The interior is notable for a main altarpiece of the Virgin in Glory and Holy Martyrs (1752) by Giuseppe Bottani. The pipe organ, recently restored by Wijwand Van der Pol, has elements from a previous organ made by Domenico Bevenuti in 1582 and Domenico Densi in 1721.
