= San Silvestro, Orte =

Church building in Orte, Italy

Coordinates: 42.46020°N 12.38641°E

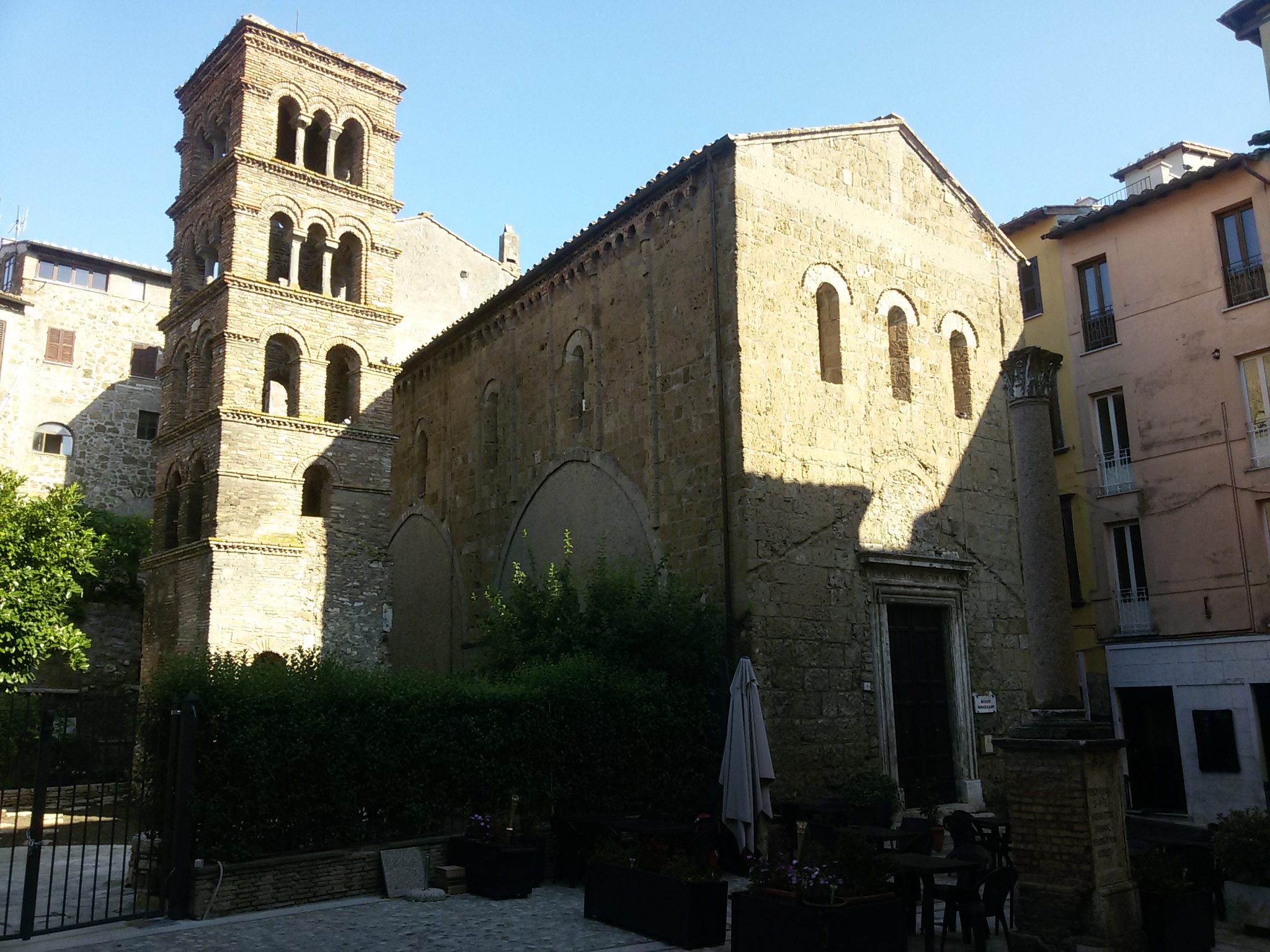
Church and bell-tower of San Silvestro

San Silvestro is a Romanesque-style deconsecrated Roman Catholic church located on Via Matteotti in the historic center of the town of Orte in the province of Viterbo, region of Lazio, Italy.

== History ==
The church was founded in the 12th century, putatively with a facade defined in 1195 by Binellius. Separate from the nave, in a small garden is the square campanile, with mullioned windows. The interior of the church had been embellished over the centuries, but a 19th-century reconstruction led to the more spare interior seen today.

In 1967, the church was converted into the Museo Diocesano e d'Arte Sacra (Diocese Museum of Sacred Art). Along with other panels and altarpieces from religious institutions, it displays an 8th-century Byzantine mosaic of the Madonna derived from the Oratory of Pope John VII in Rome.

A column rescued from the refurbishment of the cathedral was erected in the piazza in front of the church.
