= 17 RE =

Studio album by Litfiba
- Released: 1986
- Genre: New wave, darkwave, post-punk
- Length: 66:15
- Label: I.R.A. Records; CGD (reprints)
- Producer: Alberto Pirelli

Litfiba chronology
Desaparecido (1985)	17 RE (1986)	Live 12-5-87 (Aprite i vostri occhi) (1987)

17 RE (Italian: 17 Kings) is the second full-length studio album by the Italian rock band Litfiba and the second part of the "Trilogy of power", as begun with the debut, Desaparecido.

The album has been included in the ranking of the 100 most beautiful Italian albums of all time according to Rolling Stone Italia at number 86. It is the first double album in the history of Italian independent music and is considered one of the milestones of Italian new wave.

== Track listing ==
- All songs written and arranged by Litfiba.

No.	Title	Length
1.	"Resta"	2:53
2.	"Re del silenzio"	4:06
3.	"Cafè, Mexcal e Rosita"	3:11
4.	"Vendetta"	5:30
5.	"Pierrot e la Luna"	3:58
6.	"Tango"	4:33
7.	"Come un Dio"	5:10
8.	"Febbre"	3:47
9.	"Apapaia"	4:59
10.	"Univers"	5:19
11.	"Sulla terra"	4:18
12.	"Ballata"	3:53
13.	"Gira nel mio cerchio"	3:37
14.	"Cane"	2:50
15.	"Oro nero"	3:45
16.	"Ferito"	4:26

== Personnel ==
- Piero Pelù – Vocals
- Ghigo Renzulli – Guitars
- Ringo de Palma – Drums
- Antonio Aiazzi – Keyboards
- Gianni Maroccolo – Bass
- Francesco Magnelli – Piano
