= Palazzo Aragona Gonzaga =

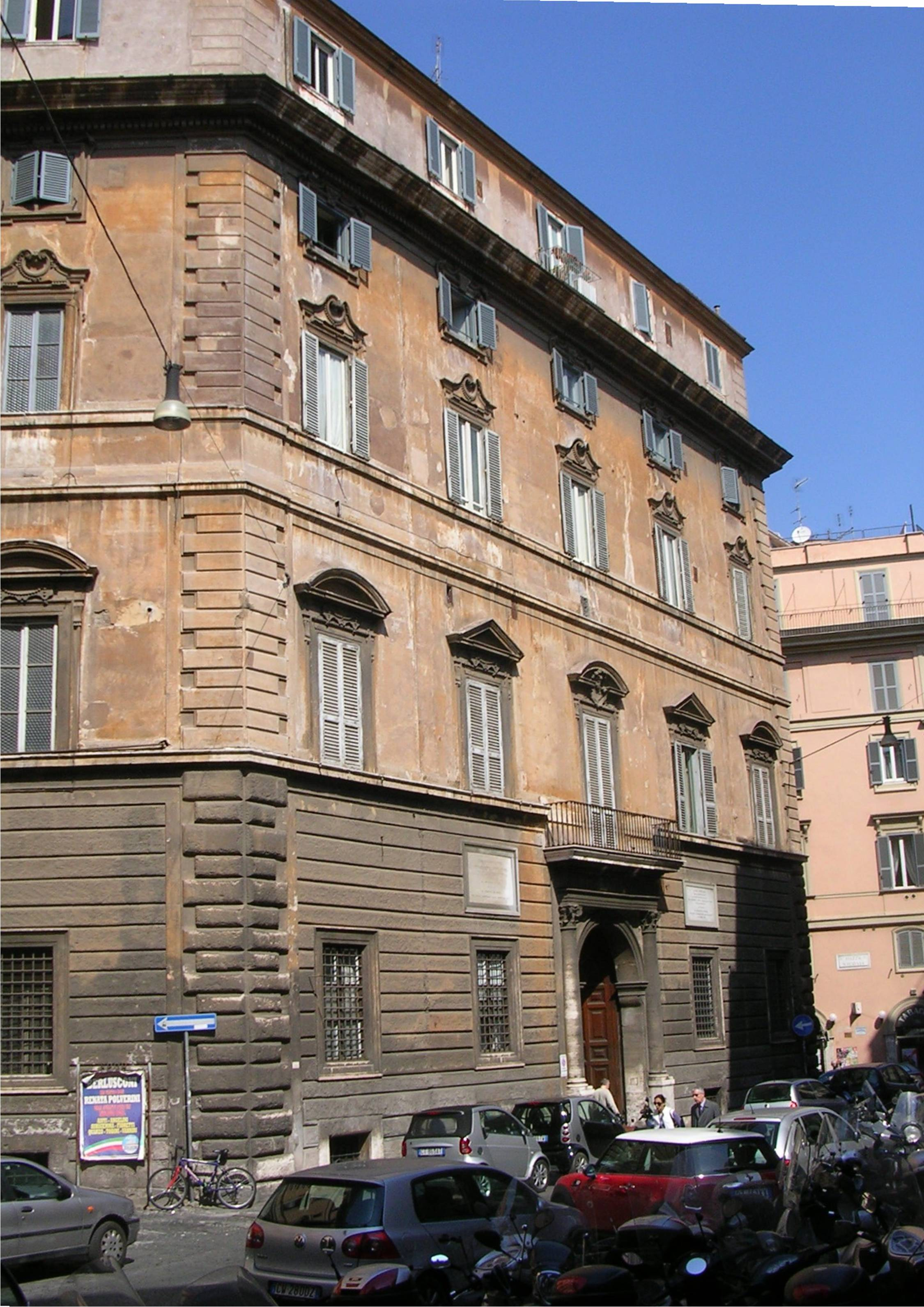
- Palazzo Aragona Gonzaga
- Click on the map for a fullscreen view

General information
- Location: Rome, Italy
- Coordinates: 41°54′11″N 12°28′30″E

Palazzo Aragona Gonzaga, also known as Palazzo Negroni, is a sixteenth-century palace in Rome, Italy. It was once the residence of Cardinal Scipione Gonzaga. During that time his cousin Luigi Gonzaga (later Saint Aloysius) also lived there, as did the poet Torquato Tasso from 1587 to 1590. In the nineteenth century it belonged to the Galitzin family, and so is also known as Palazzo Galitzin.

The building is sited at the junction of the via della Scrofa and piazza Nicosia, adjacent to the Collegio Clementino. It was originally built in the late Renaissance style but was given Baroque embellishments in the mid-eighteenth century.

== Architecture ==
Plaque commemorating Torquato Tasso's residency.

Plaque commemorating Saint Aloysius's stay in the building.

The ground plan of the building is irregular in order to fully occupy its street corner location. At first glance it appears to be rectangular, but closer inspection reveals that it is in fact an irregular pentagon.

The palace comprises five floors above a semi-basement. Its style is broadly based on Palazzo Farnese; the lower floors exemplifying the architecture of the late Renaissance found in Rome and throughout Lazio. The principal façade comprises five bays. The ground floor is pierced centrally by the entrance to a porte-cochère leading to an internal courtyard. The corners of the irregular building are accentuated by quoining, while shallow pilasters divide the five bays from the first floor upwards.

Externally, the ground floor shows banded rustication (very similar to that found in the Roman Palazzo Vidoni Caffarelli, built in 1515 and attributed to Raphael), while the floors above are of rendered ochre ashlar. In the custom of the time, the ground floor was designed for occupation by only horses, servants and domestic offices. Here on the first floor, the piano nobile, were the principal rooms. As in most Renaissance palazzi, the upper floors are reached by a broad stone staircase rising from the cloisterlike inner courtyard, this negated the need for the upper floor's noble occupants to ever visit the menial ground floor rooms.

The piano nobile contains an enfilade of principal reception rooms; the importance of these rooms is denoted on the exterior by the large size of the windows and their alternating segmental and pointed pediments.

View by Giuseppe Vasi of the Piazza Nicosia in 1748. The obtuse corner of the building (‘’pictured below’’), with its fountain, is to the left.

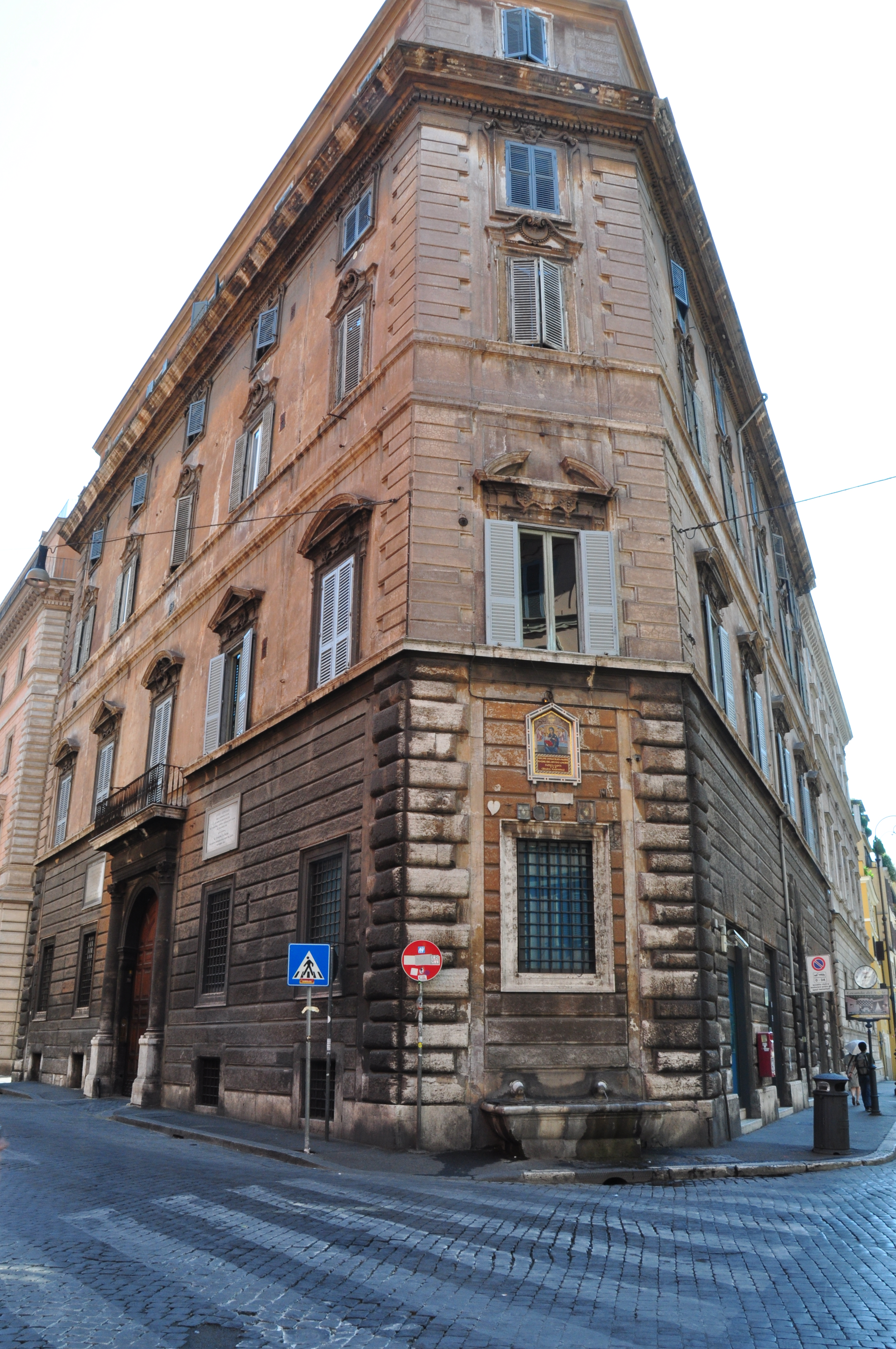
The obtuse façade and its fountain

The second floor is aesthetically divided from the first by a double band and it is quite possible that all above this band is a later addition. If this were the case, then the palace would have originally followed the simple two-storey design, which so appealed to Raphael.

The early architectural history of the building is poorly documented. What is known is that in 1701, architect Carlo Francesco Bizzaccheri added the top floor. However, the architect was either not working in his usual style or it has been subsequently altered, for the uppermost floor appears of no more architectural merit than those added to many other palazzi during the eighteenth and nineteenth centuries.

It may be that Bizzaccheri's work was altered; circa 1746 the building was acquired by the newly ennobled Negroni family who sometime between acquiring ownership and 1759 modernised the principal façade, creating its present-day appearance. This work included the Baroque pediments of the second floor windows and the pediments of the mezzanine floor. The latter were decorated with sheaths and arrows from the Negroni coat of arms, while the central pediment of the piano nobile was given extra prominence by the addition of a Negro's head in bas relief, the armorial crest of the Negroni.

The edifice is built around a central courtyard, which contains one of the palace's two fountains. The court fountain depicts the Virgin Mary; this is not contemporary with the building, and it was probably replacing an existing fountain during the Galitzin era of the later nineteenth century. The second fountain is on the external corner of the palace which tapers to the confluence of via dells Scrofa and piazza Nicosia. This is a more simple utilitarian tough fountain for the use of animals and people on the street. The ready supply of water to the building came from the re-opened the Acqua Vergine aqueduct, which had been restored in 1453.

== Occupancy ==
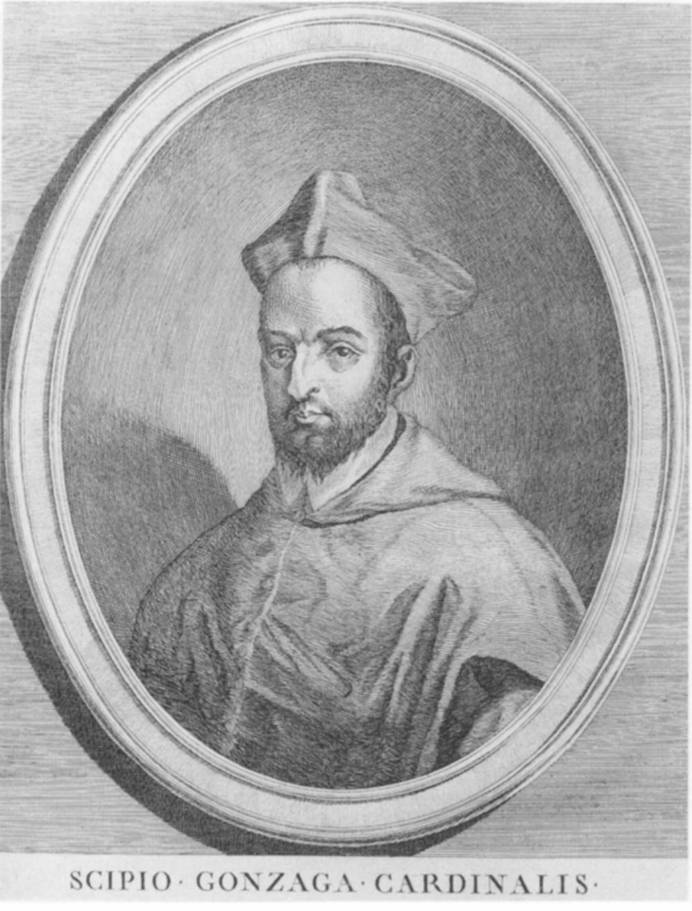
Cardinal Scipione Gonzaga

The building was most notably the residence of Cardinal Scipione Gonzaga, a scion of the Gonzaga family, who had ruled Mantua in Northern Italy from 1328. However, it is not for his piety or noble connections that the cardinal is chiefly remembered, but for his friendship and patronage of the troubled poet Torquato Tasso and his support, against other family members, for his cousin Saint Aloysius Gonzaga. Saint Aloysius stayed in the building from 20 November 1585 before renouncing his worldly possessions and rank and joining the Society of Jesus. To both Gonzaga and Tasso, the Cardinal's residence was a refuge in time of trouble.

Following the cardinal's death in 1593, the building changed ownership, and thus its name, several times. Passing through the hands of the Casate and Astalli o Staglia families, before being acquired by the Negroni and undergoing renovations and alteration. Following the Negroni it passed to the Vecchiarelli family. In the nineteenth century, it became the residence of Prince Theodore Alexandrovich Galitzin, the son of Prince Alexander Mikhailovich Galitzin (1772–1821), Russian Ambassador to Rome. Today, much of the building is sub-divided into offices and apartments. It is not open to the public.

== Sources ==
- William Cooke, Henry Humphries (1840). Rome and its surrounding scenery. London: Charles Tilt.
- Copplestone, Trewin (1963). World Architecture. Hamlyn
- Carlo Francesco Bizzaccheri (1655-1721), by Nina A. Mallory and John L. Varriano. 1974. Society of Architectural Historians.
- Monumenti Roma Retrieved 5 May 2010. (in Italian)
- Life of St. Aloysius Gonzaga. Retrieved 25 April 2010.
- Pulvers, Marvin (2002). Roman fountains: 2000 fountains in Rome. Roma: L'Erma di Bretschneider. ISBN 978-88-8265-176-3.

Preceded by Castel Sant'Angelo	Landmarks of Rome; Palazzo Aragona Gonzaga	Succeeded by Palazzo Barberini
