= San Francesco, Orte =

Church building in Orte, Italy

Coordinates: 42.46142°N 12.38592°E

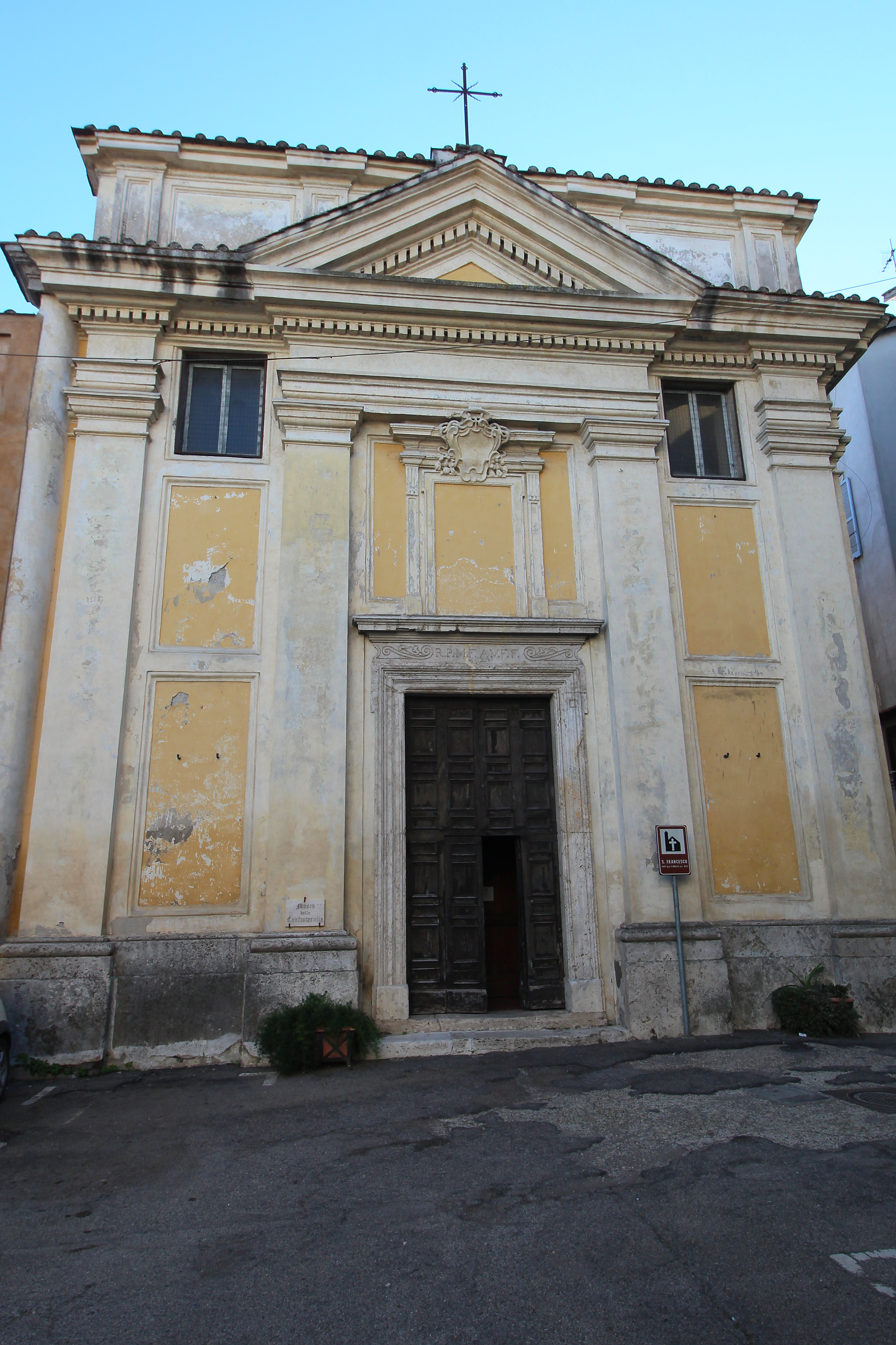
Church facade with former monastery on the left

San Francesco is a Baroque-style Roman Catholic church located on #81 Piazza Senatore Manni in the historic center of the town of Orte in the province of Viterbo, region of Lazio, Italy.

== History ==
Francis of Assisi himself had preached for some weeks near the town of Orte, and one of his followers, Teobaldo d'Assisi died in one of the first Franciscan convents, located near the Town along the Tiber river. The Franciscans moved first to San Teodoro, then the Romanesque church of Sant'Angelo at this location. The crypt of the church appears to derive from this ancient church. A convent was founded alongside this church. In 1695, the Franciscans commissioned reconstruction of the church, providing for its present layout. In the 18th-century, the church was assigned to the Compagnia della Misericordia, a confraternity and they provided some of the present decoration including the main altarpiece. The facade is mainly a sober temple front with awkwardly arranged pilasters. The interior has some six Baroque side altars.
