= Infinito (Litfiba album) =

Studio album by Litfiba
- Released: 1999
- Genre: Pop rock
- Length: 38:44
- Label: EMI
- Producer: Ghigo Renzulli, Piero Pelù

Litfiba chronology
Mondi sommersi (1997)	Infinito (1999)	Elettromacumba (2000)

Infinito (Italian: Infinite) is the eighth studio album by the Italian rock band Litfiba and the last one to feature vocalist Piero Pelù until 2009. It is the band's best-selling album to date as it sold one million copies, despite being criticized by some fans for its softer, more commercial sound. It was also the second-best selling album of 1999 in Italy.

== Track listing ==
1. "Il mio corpo che cambia" – 4:00
2. "Mascherina" – 4:09
3. "Sexy dream" – 4:39
4. "Canto di gioia" – 4:09
5. "Nuovi rampanti" – 4:27
6. "Prendi in mano i tuoi anni" – 3:55
7. "Vivere il mio tempo" – 4:25
8. "Frank" – 3:14
9. "Incantesimo" – 5:43

== Personnel ==
- Piero Pelù – vocals
- Federico Renzulli – guitars
- Franco Caforio – drums
- Roberto Terzani – keyboards
- Daniele Bagni – bass
- Andrea Giuffredi – flugelhorn, flute

Produced by Ghigo Renzulli and Piero Pelù

== Charts ==
=== Weekly charts ===
Chart (1999)	Peak position
Italian Albums (Musica e dischi)	1
Swiss Albums (Schweizer Hitparade)	44

=== Year end charts ===
Chart (1999)	Position
Italy (FIMI)	2
