= Zola Blood =

English indie pop band

- Origin: London, England
- Genres: Indie pop; synth-pop
- Years active: 2013–present
- Members: Matt West; Ed Smith; Sam Cunnington; Paul Brown
- Website: www.zolablood.com

Zola Blood is an English four-piece indie pop band from London. They released their debut album, Infinite Games, in 2017, and their second, Black Blossom, in 2022.

== History ==
Originating in different areas of the country, the four met in East London's Hackney Wick in 2013.

Zola Blood continued rehearsing and some of their first recordings emerged in 2014. Their debut single "Grace" garnered interest from blogs worldwide and was soon followed by another track, "Meridian". Both songs reached the top of the Hype Machine chart. "Meridian" was remixed by Berlin producer Applescal, and thus introduced the band to new audiences. The band released their first EP, Meridian, in October 2014.

In 2015, the band teamed up with jazz musician Richard Formby (the Jazz Butcher) and released the single "Play Out/Pieces of the Day". On this track, they experimented with modular synths and outboard gear in a lengthy studio session spanning south London and Leeds. The single earned them a late-night slot at the Secret Garden Party music festival in the summer of the same year. In 2016, they began work on their debut LP Infinite Games. They collaborated with various other musicians including Oli Bayston (Boxed In) and Duncan Tootill. The album's first single, "Heartbeat", was released in July 2016 and blended pop and techno influences. "Islands" followed on New Year's Eve and featured on a number of major Spotify playlists, including the US New Music Friday playlist. The album was released in May 2017.

== Band members ==
- Matt West – vocals
- Ed Smith – synths
- Paul Brown – guitars
- Sam Cunnington – drums

== Discography ==
=== Studio albums ===
- Infinite Games (2017)
- Black Blossom (2022)

=== EPs ===
- Meridian (2014)
- Two Hearts (2020)
- Two Hearts Live at A&B (2020)
- Two Hearts Remix EP (2020)
- Nothing Is Wasted (2025)

=== Singles ===
- "Grace" (2014)
- "Meridian" (2014)
- "Play Out/Pieces of the Day" (2015)
- "Heartbeat" (2016)
- "Islands" (2016)
- "Good Love" (2017)
- "Nothing" (2017)
- "The Only Thing" (2017)

- "Get Light" (2017)
- "Two Hearts" (2020)
- "Silver Soul" (2020)
- "It Never Goes" (2022)
- "For the Birds" (2022)
- "What Matters Now" (2022)
- "Together" (2025)
- "By Ourselves" (2025)
