= Litfiba =

Italian rock band

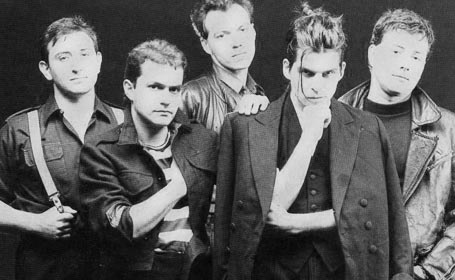
- Litfiba in 1983. Left to right: Renzulli, Franchi, Aiazzi, Pelù, Maroccolo

Background information
- Origin: Florence, Italy
- Genres: New wave; latin rock; hard rock; pop rock; latin metal; heavy metal
- Years active: 1980–2022; 2025–present
- Label: Sony
- Members: Ghigo Renzulli; Piero Pelù; Gianni Maroccolo; Antonio Aiazzi; Luca Martelli
- Past members: Gianmarco Colzi; Roberto Terzani; Daniele Bagni; Ringo De Palma; Francesco Calamai; Renzo Franchi; Gianluigi Cavallo; Federico Sagona; Gianluca Venier; Pino Fidanza; Cosimo Zannelli
- Website: litfiba.net

Litfiba is an Italian rock band formed in Florence in 1980. The band evolved from a British-influenced new wave rock to a more personal rock sound influenced by Mediterranean vibes; their songs are mostly sung in Italian.

== History ==
=== First era (1980–1989) ===
The band was formed in Florence in 1980, and was named after the telex code for Via dei Bardi, Florence, where the band rehearsed (Località ITalia FIrenze via dei BArdi). The early line-up consisted of Federico Renzulli (nicknamed Ghigo) on guitars and lead vocals, Gianni Maroccolo on bass, Sandro Dotta on lead guitar (who left the band after a few weeks) and Francesco Calamai on drums. Antonio Aiazzi on keyboards and Piero Pelù on vocals joined the band shortly after. Punk and new wave were a huge influence on the band's early songs, which often had English lyrics.

Their first show took place on 6 December 1980 in Settignano, near Florence.

The band's first recording was a five-track EP titled Guerra (1982), followed one year later by a 7-inch single, "Luna/La preda", which won the band first place at the 2° Festival Rock Italiano.

Meanwhile, Calamai was replaced on drums by Renzo Franchi; with this line-up, the band worked on a soundtrack album, Eneide di Krypton.

After a while, Franchi then left the band, to be replaced by Luca De Benedectis, known as Ringo De Palma with whom the band recorded Yassassin, a 12-inch (300 mm) single containing a brand new track, "Electrica Danza", and a David Bowie cover.

==== Trilogy of power ====
The band released their first full-length album, Desaparecido (Spanish for "Disappeared") in 1985. Following the EP, Transea (1986) and the second full-length 17 RE (17 Kings in Italian), Litfiba toured for the first time, subsequently releasing 12/5/87 (aprite i vostri occhi), their first live album. Litfiba 3 (1988) was the last recording featuring Maroccolo, de Palma et Aiazzi as permanent members, although the latter would stay as session musician until 1996.

The first three albums form the "Trilogy of power" (in Italian, "Trilogia del potere"), stating the refusal of every kind of totalitarianism. The release of the Pirata live album, recorded on the 1988–89 tour, marked the end of the "Trilogy of power" years.

=== Second era (1989–1999) ===
The second leg of the tour was filmed and released as a VHS tape titled "Pirata Tour", featuring Roberto Terzani on bass, Daniele Trambusti on drums and Candelo Cabezas on percussions besides Pelù, Renzulli and Aiazzi. Pelù and Renzulli then went back to the studio to record El Diablo, which achieved Platinum sales in Italy. The following tour, with Federico Poggipollini on rhythm guitar, was also filmed for home video release.

Sogno Ribelle (1992) was a compilation of re-arranged songs from previous albums, live tracks and a previously unreleased song titled "Linea d'ombra". It was once more followed by a VHS featuring music videos, live performances samples and interviews. The year after, the band released Terremoto ("Earthquake"), soon followed by the double live CD Colpo di coda.

When changing their label from CGD to EMI (with legal complications due to the release of unauthorized compilations), the band hired a new bass player, Daniele "Barny" Bagni, and recorded the third volume of its "tetralogy of elements": El Diablo was celebrating fire, Terremoto soil, the new album Spirito (1994) celebrates the air. The record was, as usual, followed by a VHS: Lacio drom which contains extracts from the "Spirito tour".

The 1997 Mondi sommersi album brought out the missing element, water, as Aiazzi left the band, replaced on keyboards by Terzani, who also remained the second guitar player (as it appears to be in the last tour). Litfiba's biggest tour was immortalized on a VHS, whose profits went to the victims of earthquakes in Umbria and Marche regions, and on a double live CD both titled Croce e delizia. Infinito (1999) was the very last chapter of the band's history with frontman Piero Pelù as a vocalist. The last show with Pelù took place at the "Monza Rock Festival 1999".

=== Third era (1999–2009) ===
When Pelù said farewell to the band three of Litfiba's musicians also left with him: Bagni, Terzani and Caforio. Renzulli lost the rights to the band's logo, a horned heart, but kept the name Litfiba, which is copyrighted under his name. The guitarist then decided to follow on immediately with a renewed and rejuvenated band, including the new singer Gianluigi "Cabo" Cavallo, bass and drums player Gianluca Venier, and Ugo Nativi, coming from the funk-rock band Malfunk.

The 2000 album was titled Elettromacumba. On the following "Elettro tour", Litfiba, with Mauro Sabbione, who had already played on the El Diablo album, on keyboards, played in smaller halls than before. After the tour, the band released Live on Line, including 15 tracks recorded during the last tour available only for download under MP3 format through web portal Lycos.

The musicians went back to the studio, with Nativi replaced on drums by Gianmarco Colzi, who had played with band Rockgalileo and singer Biagio Antonacci, for the recording of the Insidia album (2001). The record was much different from the previous album, due to darker lyrics with many symbolic references and the significant use of electronics. It was soon followed by the "Insidia tour", a 73 concerts tour that was the first part of the "Never ending tour". The band was then requested to release the soundtrack for the Italian version of the Tomb raider 6 – The Angel of Darkness video game, resulting in the issue of "Larasong", a stand-alone single. Former keyboards player Antonio Aiazzi returned to the band for the 2003 "Lara Tour" and 2004 "04 Tour", the second and third part of the "Never ending tour". The last concert was recorded for the release of Litfiba's official first DVD.

The last album to date, Essere o sembrare (2005), appeared to be moderately inspired and had a relative success. The release of the record was followed by a short tour, almost 15 concerts, followed by others during 2006 summer. In late 2006 singer Gianluigi "Cabo" Cavallo leaves the band, followed by bass player Gianluca Venier and keyboard player Antonio Aiazzi. Filippo Margheri, who previously fronted Miir, replaced Cavallo, while Roberto Terzani, who had previously played with Litfiba, and Pino Fidanza join respectively at bass and drums.

=== Fourth era (2009–present) ===
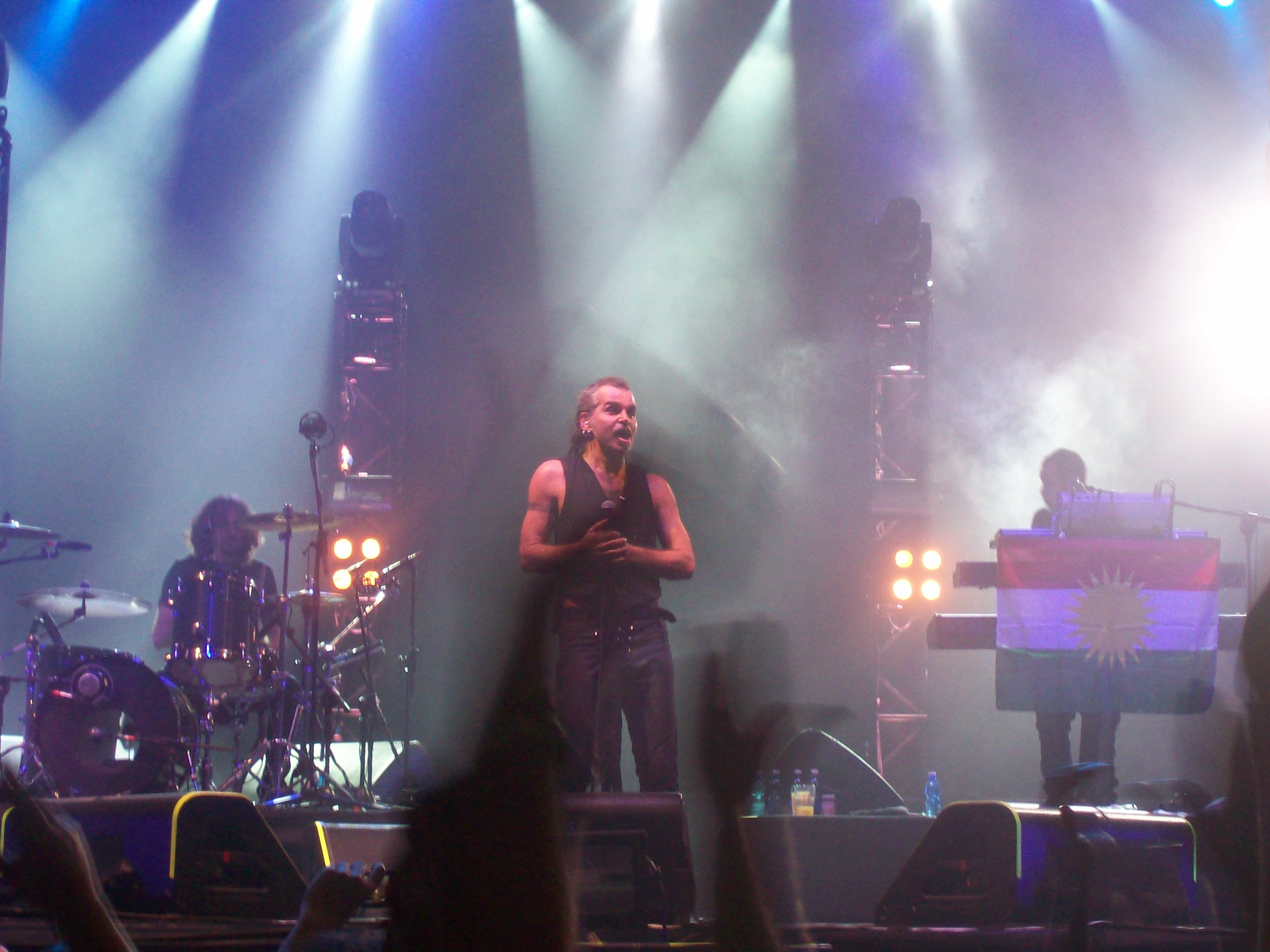
Litfiba performing in 2010

In November 2009, the long-time manager of the band Alberto Pirelli announced Litfiba was going to break up. One month later, on 11 December 2009, a message posted on the official website of the band announced the surprising reunion of the two historical founders: Piero Pelù and Ghigo Renzulli. They played four concerts in spring 2010 as Litfiba: Milan (13 April), Florence (16 April), Rome (19 April), and Acireale (21 April). A longer tour and a new album was expected in the second half of the year. The band published the successful live album Stato libero di Litfiba which also included two unreleased tracks: "Sole Nero" and "Barcollo". On 17 January 2012 the new album Grande nazione came out, led by the singles Squalo (25 November 2011) and La mia valigia (13 January 2012). In January 2013 the band reunited with original founders Gianni Maroccolo and Antonio Aiazzi, as well as new addition on drums Luca Martelli (from Giorgio Canali's Rossofuoco) and started a tour called "Trilogia 1983-1989", playing only songs from the historical "Trilogy Of Power" plus some related singles from the same period. The band produced a live CD ("Trilogia '83-'89") at the end of the historical reunion. Later in 2013, Litfiba began a hiatus to permit its members to pursue their personal and artistic projects. After a last gig with the "Trilogia" line-up in Sardinia, the band announces a tour for 2015 which celebrated the following era of the band. The "Tetralogia Tour" focused on the 4 albums "El Diablo", "Terremoto", "Spirito" and "Mondi sommersi", dedicated to the elements of fire, earth, air and water respectively. Ghigo and Piero hit the stage with a renewed line-up which included drummer Luca Martelli, keyboardist Federico Sagona (already on "Stato libero" and "Grande nazione") and new bass player Franco Li Causi. New album "Eutopia" follows, followed by some last tours in which keyboard player Fabrizio Simoncioni (already with the band as musician and engineer in the 1990s) and new bass player Dado Neri are involved together with Martelli on drums.

On 29 October 2025, the band updated their social media with an image consisting only of the text "2026". Days after, Litfiba announce the second reunion of their original core line-up consisting of Pelu', Renzulli, Maroccolo and Aiazzi (plus once again drummer Luca Martelli) for the celebration of the 4'th anniversary of their iconic second album, "17 Re", in the summer of following year.

== Members ==
=== Line-up ===
- Piero Pelù: vocals (1980–1999, 2009–2022, 2025-present)
- Federico "Ghigo" Renzulli: guitars (1980–2022, 2025-present)
- Gianni Maroccolo: bass (1980–1989, 2012–2014, 2025-present)
- Antonio Aiazzi: keyboards (1980–1997, 2003–2006, 2012–2014, 2016, 2025-present)
- Luca Martelli: drums (2012–2022, 2025-present)

=== Past members ===
- Federico Sagona: Keyboards (2009–2012, 2015–2016)
- Francesco Calamai: drums (founder member; 1980–1983)
- Renzo Franchi: drums (1983)
- Ringo De Palma: drums (1983–1989) passed away in 1990
- Daniele Trambusti: drums (1987, 1989–1992)
- Roberto Terzani: bass (1989–1994, 2007–2009), rhythm guitar (1994–1999) and keyboards (1997–1999)
- Candelo Cabezas: percussions (1989–1992, 1994–1997) passed away in 1997
- Federico Poggipollini: rhythm guitar (1990–1993)
- Franco Caforio: drums (1992–1999)
- Daniele Bagni: bass (1994–1999, 2009–2012)
- Gianluigi Cavallo: vocals (1999–2006)
- Gianluca Venier: bass (1999–2006), keyboards (2016)
- Ugo Nativi: drums (1999–2001)
- Gianmarco Colzi: drums (2001–2008)
- Filippo Margheri: vocals (2007–2009)
- Pino Fidanza: drums (2008–2012)
- Cosimo Zannelli: rhythm guitar (2011–2012)
- Franco Li Causi: bass (2015–2017)
- Fabrizio Simoncioni: keyboards (1990, 2016–2022)
- Dado Neri: bass (2021–2022)

== Discography ==
=== Studio albums ===
- Desaparecido (1985)
- 17 RE (1986)
- Litfiba 3 (1988)
- El Diablo (1990)
- Terremoto (1993)
- Spirito (1994)
- Mondi sommersi (1997)
- Infinito (1999)
- Elettromacumba (2000)
- Insidia (2001)
- Essere o sembrare (2005)
- Grande nazione (2012)
- Eutòpia (2016)

=== Other releases ===
- Guerra (1982, EP)
- Luna/La preda (1983, single)
- Eneide di Krypton (1983, soundtrack album)
- Yassassin (1984, EP)
- Transea (1986, EP)
- Live 12-5-87 (Aprite i vostri occhi) (1987, live album)
- Pirata (1989, live album)
- Sogno ribelle (1992, greatest hits + 1 unreleased song)
- Colpo di coda (1994, live album + 2 unreleased songs)
- Lacio drom (Buon viaggio) (1994, a box containing a VHS and a live album + 4 remixed songs)
- Croce e delizia (1998, live album)
- Live on Line (2000, live album)
- The Platinum Collection (2003, greatest hits)
- Stato libero di Litfiba (2010, live album + 2 unreleased songs)
- Trilogia 1983–1989 live 2013 (2013, live album)
- 17 RE live 1986 - 2026 (2026, live album)
