= El Diablo (album) =

Studio album by Litfiba

Studio album by Litfiba
- Released: 1990
- Genre: Hard rock, latin rock
- Length: 36:33
- Label: EMI
- Producer: Alberto Pirelli

Litfiba chronology
Pirata (1989)	El Diablo (1990)	Sogno ribelle (1992)

Professional ratings
Review scores
Source	Rating
AllMusic	(not rated)

El Diablo (Spanish: The Devil) is the fourth studio album by the Italian rock band Litfiba. It introduces a more rock sounding in the band's music, which used to be much more new wave influenced until there. It is the first chapter of the "Tetralogy of elements" and it is dedicated to fire.

== Track listing ==
1. "El Diablo" – 4:26
2. "Proibito" – 3:49
3. "Il volo" – 4:22
4. "Siamo umani" – 4:09
5. "Woda Woda" – 5:04
6. "Ragazzo" – 4:42
7. "Gioconda" – 5:08
8. "Resisti" – 4:50

== Personnel ==
- Piero Pelù – Vocals
- Ghigo Renzulli – Guitars
- Daniele Trambusti – Drums
- Antonio Aiazzi – Keyboards
- Roberto Terzani – Bass
- Candelo Cabezas – Percussions

Recorded by Fabrizio Simoncioni Produced by Alberto Pirelli

== Charts ==
Chart (1990–1991)	Peak position
Italy (Musica e dischi)	19

== Certifications ==
Region	Certification	Certified units/sales
Italy (FIMI)	Platinum	100,000^{*}
^{*} Sales figures based on certification alone.
