= Gianluigi Cavallo =

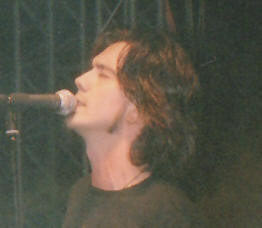

Background information
- Also known as: DjCavallo, Indyana, Lord Viper, Cabo, L'Eretico
- Born: 9 August 1968 (age 57)
- Origin: Parma, Italy
- Genres: Rock
- Occupations: Singer, guitarist
- Years active: 1994–present
- Website: www.gianluigicavallo.it

Gianluigi Cavallo (born 9 August 1968), also known as Cabo, is an Italian singer, guitarist, composer, system integrator and programmer. He played in the band Litfiba from 1999 to 2006.

== The beginnings ==
While working as programmer, following his passion for music, Gianluigi Cavallo performed as DJ in different independent radios, becoming a valued singer in some of them. The nickname "Cabo" is a contraction from the Spanish form of his surname (Caballo).
His record debut was in 1994 with the mix 12" Brooklyn in which there were three different versions of "Cavalcamix", a sort of electrodance medley of '50s rock music. Some months later he produced a new mix 12" called "Indyana" with the dance piece A say baby, a revisitation of a riff from the song Black Betty by Ram Jam.

== Career with Litfiba ==
In 1999 he became singer and frontman of the popular Italian rock band Litfiba. With them Cavallo wrote lyrics and music of Elettromacumba (2000), Insidia (2001), and Essere o sembrare (2005) winning 4 gold records and selling about 200,000 discs.
During the period with the band Cavallo took place in many tours and two live albums. The first of them, Live on Line, published in 2000, had also a free distribution by the search engine Lycos. For this, in Italy they were the forerunners in legally downloaded music. Cabo announced his departure from Litfiba in November 2006 with an email sent to his fans.

== The radio adventure ==
From 1998 to 2002 he was the presenter of three radio programs: Time to Rock, where he broadcast rock classics of the past, L'avvocato del diavolo (The Devil's Advocate), in which told the "mysterious and strange stories of rock'n'roll" and L'Eretico (the Heretic), a "trip through history, secrets, myths and legends". From 2014 a lot of these radiophonic recordings became available via streaming, by himself Cabo, by Mixcloud.

== After Litfiba ==
In the period with Litfiba, Cavallo produced together with Carlo Barducci (Parsifal studios owner) the first album by the folk band Scaramouche and of Morpin. When he departed from Litfiba came back to informatics and now he is General Manager and co-founder of VirtualCom Interactive, one of the most important national software houses. In Virtualcom he invented an advanced ePaper solution for mobile devices used by thousand Italian and international newspaper to show online the contents of the papery magazine.

== Today ==
On 8 November 2014, after 7 years far from musical scenes, he published a videoclip where he plays a cover of Heroes by David Bowie.

== Discography ==
=== Soloist ===
- 1994 – Brooklyn (12" with alias "DJ Cavallo")
- 1994 – A say Baby (12" with alias "Indyana")
- 1995 – Il Patto
- 2014 – Heroes (David Bowie cover)

== Discography performing with Litfiba ==
=== Album ===
- 2000 – Elettromacumba
- 2001 – Insidia
- 2005 – Essere o sembrare

=== Anthology ===
- 2003 – The Platinum Collection

=== Live ===
- 2001 – Live on Line

=== Videography ===
- 2004 – Cento giorni verso est...

=== Compilations ===
- 2000 – Festivalbar 2000 (Il giardino della follia)
- 2003 – Demo Collection (Larasong – demo version)

=== Singles ===
- 2000 – Elettromacumba (cd single)
- 2000 – Il giardino della follia (cd single, radio edit mix)
- 2000 – Spia (cd single)
- 2001 – La stanza dell'oro (cd single)
- 2001 – Mr. Hyde (cd single, radio edit mix)
- 2001 – Senza Rete (cd single)
- 2003 – Larasong (cd single, two different covers)
- 2005 – Giorni di vento (cd single, radio edit mix)

=== Videoclip ===
- 2000 – Elettromacumba
- 2000 – Il giardino della follia
- 2000 – Spia
- 2001 – La stanza dell’oro
- 2001 – Mr.Hyde
- 2003 – Larasong

== See also ==
- Litfiba
