= Desaparecido (album) =

Studio album by Litfiba
- Released: 1985
- Studio: Global Art System Studio
- Genre: New wave, post-punk
- Length: 33:28
- Label: I.R.A. Records; CGD (reprints)
- Producer: Alberto Pirelli

Litfiba chronology
Eneide di Krypton (1983)	Desaparecido (1985)	17 RE (1986)

Desaparecido is the first full-length studio album by the Italian rock band Litfiba, though the band had previously released five EPs or singles and a soundtrack album, Eneide di Krypton. The music is very British new wave-influenced, though the lyrics are in Italian.

It is the first part of the "Trilogy of power": a group of albums whose main theme is the rejection of violence and totalitarianism. The sound combines new wave influences with a taste for typically Mediterranean melody, a characteristic strongly sought after by the band at the time. The complex lyrics often have a dreamlike and lysergic component, and are characterized by the use of metaphor.

== Track listing ==
- All songs written and arranged by Litfiba
1. "Eroi nel vento" – 3:47
2. "La preda" – 2:52
3. "Lulù e Marlene" – 4:43
4. "Istanbul" – 5:44
5. "Tziganata" – 2:56
6. "Pioggia di luce" – 4:30
7. "Desaparecido" – 3:25
8. "Guerra" – 5:29

== Personnel ==
=== Litfiba ===
- Piero Pelù – vocals
- Federico Renzulli – guitars
- Ringo de Palma – drums
- Antonio Aiazzi – keyboards
- Gianni Maroccolo – bass

=== Additional personnel ===
- Francesco Magnelli: Additional keyboards
- Hanno Rinne: Guitar solo on track 6
- Lu Rashid: Vocals on track 4

== Production ==
- Produced by Alberto Pirelli
- Co-produced by Carlo Rossi
- Recorded by Carlo Rossi
- Mixed by Carlo Rossi and Alberto Pirelli
- Mastered by Carlo Rossi
- All songs published by Anemic Music/Edizioni Musicali, except tracks 2 and 8 (Anemic Music/Edizioni Musicali/Usignolo/Ed. Musicali)

== Bibliography ==
- AA.VV. Luca Frazzi (ed.). "Litfiba - Desaparecido". Rumore 100 - 100 Dischi Essenziali della New Wave & Postpunk Italiani.
- Alberto Campo (1995). Nuovo? rock?! italiano!: una storia, 1980-1996. Prato: Giunti Editore. ISBN 88-09-20999-0
- Federico Guglielmi (2000). A denti stretti: la vera storia dei Litfiba. Giunti. p. 35. ISBN 978-88-09-01729-0. ISBN 88-09-01729-3
