= Orte =

- Comune
- Comune di Orte
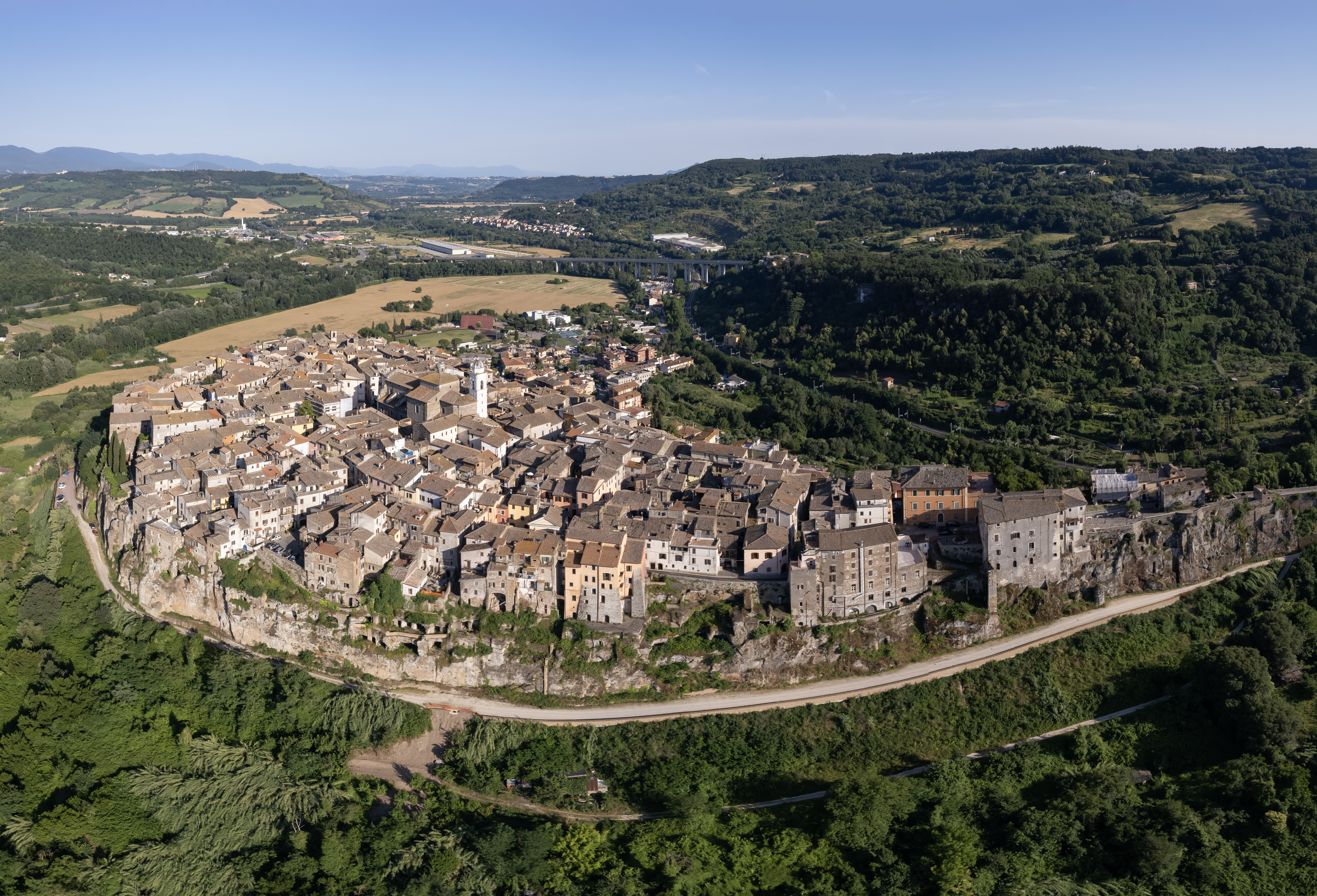
- Panorama of Orte

- Coat of arms

- Location within Italy Location within Lazio
- Coordinates: 42°27′37″N 12°23′11″E
- Country: Italy
- Region: Lazio
- Province: Viterbo (VT)
- Frazioni: Orte Scalo

Government
  - Mayor: Dino Primieri

Area
  - Total: 70.16 km^{2} (27.09 sq mi)
- Elevation: 132 m (433 ft)

Population (31 December 2014)
  - Total: 8,982
  - Density: 128.0/km^{2} (331.6/sq mi)
- Demonym: Ortani
- Time zone: UTC+1 (CET)
  - Summer (DST): UTC+2 (CEST)
- Postal code: 01028
- Dialing code: 0761
- Patron saint: St. Giles Abbot
- Saint day: September 1
- Website: Official website

Orte is a town, comune, former Catholic bishopric and Latin titular see in the province of Viterbo, in the central Italian region of Lazio, located about 60 kilometres (37 mi) north of Rome and about 24 kilometres (15 mi) east of Viterbo.

== Geography ==
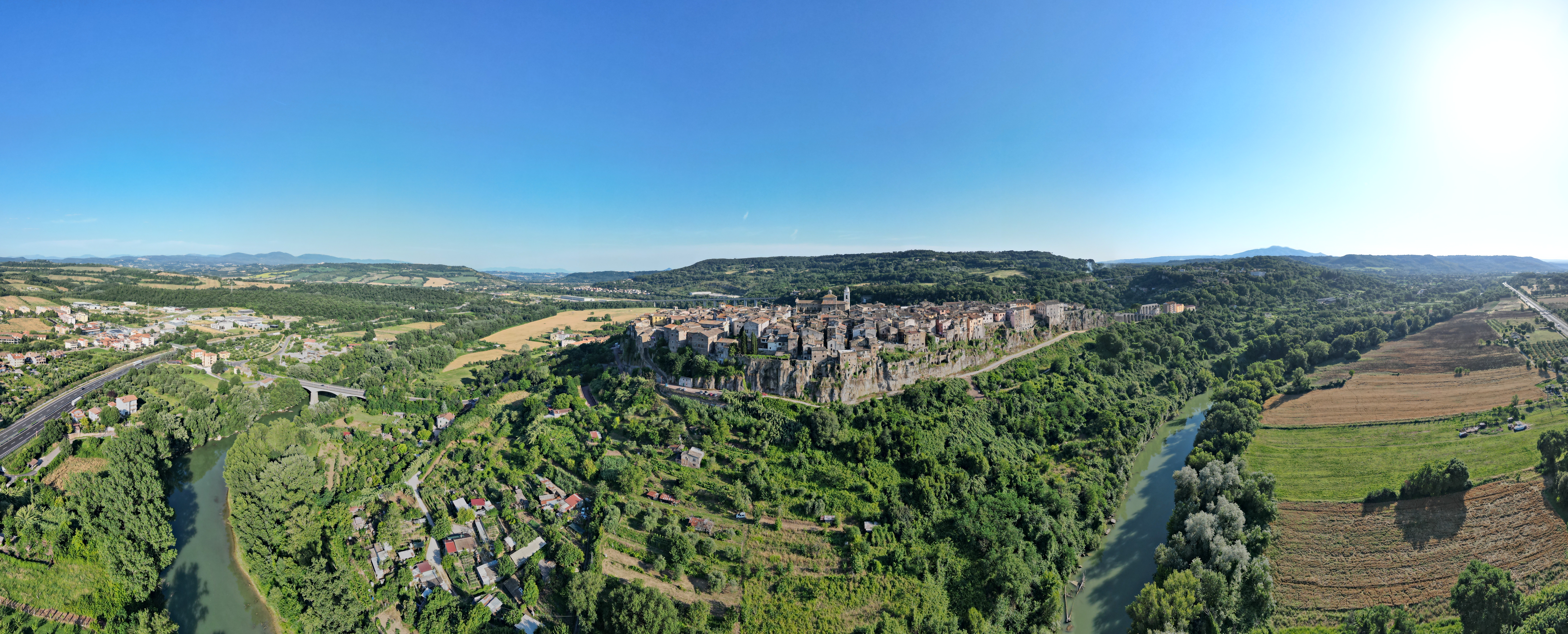
Orte aerial panorama. June 2024

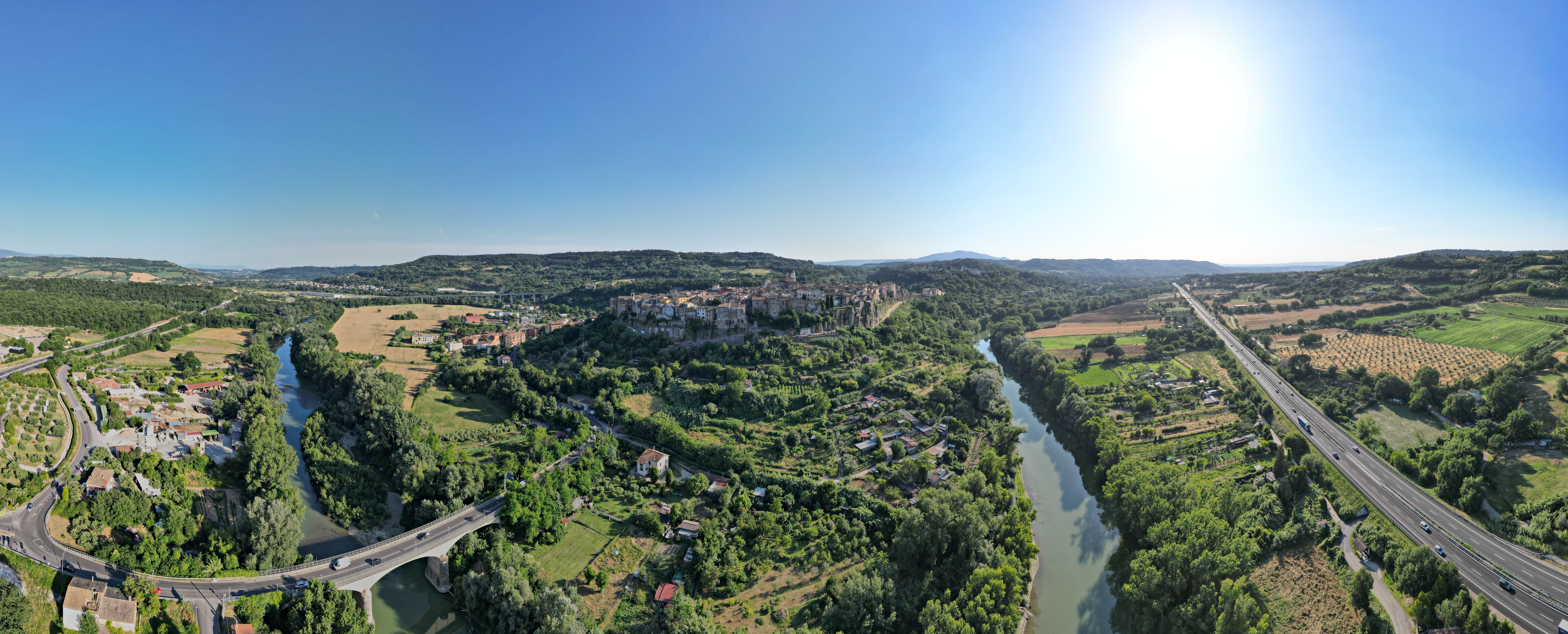
Orte and the River Tiber. June 2024.

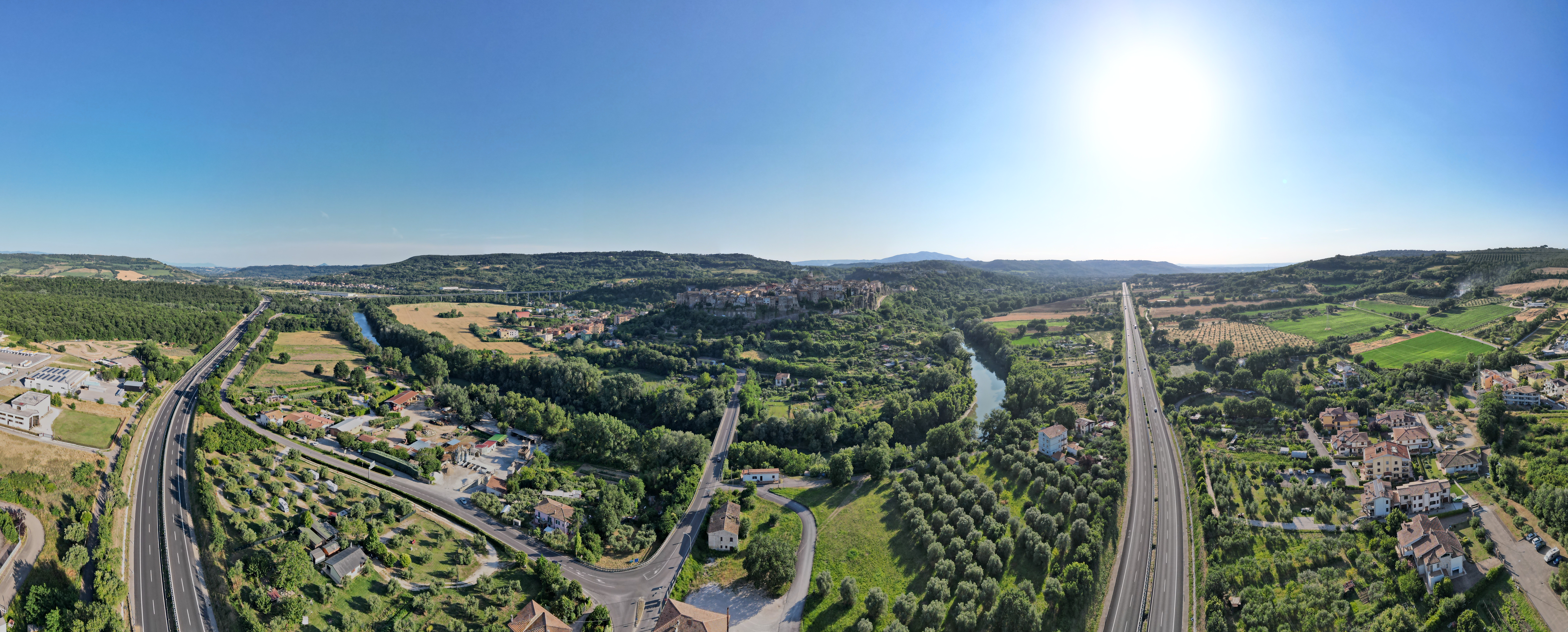
Orte and its significance as a transport hub from above. June 2024.

Orte is situated in the Tiber Valley on a high tuff cliff, encircled to North and East from a handle of the Tevere river. It is an important road and rail hub.

== History ==
The Etruscans inhabited the area from the 6th century BC and called it Hurta, as testified by the findings in a necropolis nearby, now preserved in the Vatican Museums. Two major battles between Etruscans and Romans (310 and 283 BC) were fought nearby on the shores of the Vadimone lake. The Romans were victorious both times.

The Romans domination made it the municipality of Horta (also Hortanum). Under the rule of Augustus, it received numerous public works. Because of its strategic position, Orte was occupied in succession by the Ostrogoths, the Byzantines and the Lombards. During the late 9th to early 10th century, along with much of central Italy, Orte was also held or threatened by the Saracens.

In the Middle Ages, the city was never seat of a fief, becoming a free comune under a podestà (elected magistrature). Later it became part of the Papal States.

George Dennis visited Orte in the 1840s. He describes it as picturesque, but having scarcely any visible Roman or Etruscan remnants.

== Main Sights ==
- Cathedral of Orte
- San Francesco: baroque church
- San Silvestro, Orte

== Events ==
- Sant'Egidio Abate's Day and Ottava of Sant'Egidio: from 31 August to the second Sunday in September. A Medieval festival with shows, fairs, conventions, seminaries of study, art exhibitions of art and archery competitions (the "Palio", contented by the archers of the Seven Contrade).
- Religious procession of Dead Christ: every Friday before Easter. A torchlight procession representing early religions orders ("Confraternity").

== Transport ==
Orte railway station, opened in 1865, forms part of the Florence–Rome railway and the Ancona–Orte railway. It is situated in Piazza Giovanni XXIII, in the locality of Orte Scalo, approximately two kilometres southeast of the town centre.

== Notable inhabitants ==
- Evangelina Mascardi (b. 1977), lutenist, guitarist, and theorbo player

== See also ==
- Diocese of Orte
- List of Catholic dioceses in Italy

== Sources and external links ==
Media related to Orte at Wikimedia Commons

- Orte municipal website
- Ottovamedievale.it
- GCatholic - former & titular bishopric

Bibliography - ecclesiastical history

- Ferdinando Ughelli, Italia sacra, vol. I, second edition, Venice 1717, coll. 733-743
- Tommaso M. Mamachi, De episcopatus hortani antiquitate ad hortanos cives liber singularis, Rome 1759
- Giuseppe Cappelletti, Le Chiese d'Italia della loro origine sino ai nostri giorni, vol. VI, Venice 1847, pp. 23–49
- Louis Duchesne, Le sedi episcopali nell'antico ducato di Roma, in Archivio della romana società di storia patria, Volume XV, Rome 1892, p. 491
- Paul Fridolin Kehr, Italia Pontificia, vol. II, Berlin 1907, pp. 192–194
- Gerhard Schwartz, Die Besetzung der Bistümer Reichsitaliens unter den Sächsischen und Salischen Kaisern : mit den Listen der Bischöfe, 951-1122, Leipzig-Berlin 1913, p. 259
- Francesco Lanzoni, Le diocesi d'Italia dalle origini al principio del secolo VII (an. 604), vol. I, Faenza 1927, pp. 546–547
- Pius Bonifacius Gams, Series episcoporum Ecclesiae Catholicae, Leipzig 1931, pp. 685–686
- Konrad Eubel, Hierarchia Catholica Medii Aevi, vol. 1, pp. 278–279; vol. 2, pp. XXVI e 166
