= Sanremo Music Festival 2000 =

Italian song contest (50th edition)

Dates and venue
- Semi-final 1: 21 February 2000
- Semi-final 2: 22 February 2000
- Semi-final 3: 24 February 2000
- Semi-final 4: 25 February 2000
- Final: 26 February 2000
- Venue: Teatro Ariston; Sanremo, Italy

Organisation
- Broadcaster: Radiotelevisione italiana (RAI)
- Musical director: Gianfranco Lombardi
- Artistic director: Mario Maffucci
- Presenters: Fabio Fazio and Luciano Pavarotti, Teo Teocoli, Inés Sastre

Big Artists section
- Number of entries: 16
- Winner: "Sentimento"; Piccola Orchestra Avion Travel

Newcomers' section
- Number of entries: 18
- Winner: "Semplice sai" Jenny B

The Sanremo Music Festival 2000 (Italian: Festival di Sanremo 2000), officially the 50th Italian Song Festival (50º Festival della canzone italiana), was the 50th annual Sanremo Music Festival, held at the Teatro Ariston in Sanremo in late February 2000 and broadcast by Radiotelevisione italiana (RAI). The show was presented by Fabio Fazio, supported by Luciano Pavarotti, Teo Teocoli and Inés Sastre. Composers Pino Donaggio and Giorgio Moroder and lyricist Carla Vistarini served as the artistic directors.

The winners of the Big Artists section were the group Piccola Orchestra Avion Travel with the song "Sentimento", while Samuele Bersani won the Critics Award with the song "Replay". Jenny B won the Newcomers section with the song "Semplice sai".

After every night, Alessia Marcuzzi and the comedy duo Fichi d'India hosted DopoFestival, a talk show about the festival with the participation of singers and journalists.

== Participants and results ==
=== Big Artists ===
Big Artists section
Song	Artist(s)	Songwriter(s)	Rank	Notes
"Sentimento"	Piccola Orchestra Avion Travel	Beppe Servillo; Domenico Ciaramella; Giuseppe D'Argenzio; Fausto Mesolella; Ferruccio Spinetti; Mario Tronco	1	Winner of the "Big Artists" section
"La tua ragazza sempre"	Irene Grandi	Vasco Rossi; Gaetano Curreri	2	
"Innamorato"	Gianni Morandi	Adelio Cogliati; Eros Ramazzotti; Claudio Guidetti	3	
"Il timido ubriaco"	Max Gazzè	Max Gazzè; Francesco Gazzè	4	Volare Award for Best Music; Volare Award for Best Arrangement
"Replay"	Samuele Bersani	Samuele Bersani; Beppe D'Onghia	5	Mia Martini Critics Award
"Gechi e vampiri"	Gerardina Trovato	Gerardina Trovato; Tom Sinatra	6	
"In bianco e nero"	Carmen Consoli	Carmen Consoli	7	
"Brivido caldo"	Matia Bazar	Giancarlo Golzi; Piero Cassano	8	
"Il giorno dell'indipendenza"	Alice	Juri Camisasca	9	
"Non dirgli mai"	Gigi D'Alessio	Vincenzo D'Agostino; Gigi D'Alessio	10	
"Tutti i miei sbagli"	Subsonica	Samuel Umberto Romano; Max Casacci; Davide Dileo	11	
"Con il tuo nome"	Spagna	Ivana Spagna; Claudio Tarantola; Giorgio Spagna	12	
"Fare l'amore"	Mietta	Pasquale Panella; Armando Mango; Giuseppe Mango	13	
"Futuro come te"	Mariella Nava & Amedeo Minghi	Mariella Nava; Amedeo Minghi	14	
"Raccontami di te"	Marco Masini	Marco Masini; Giuseppe Dati	15	
"Un'altra vita"	Umberto Tozzi	Umberto Tozzi	16	

=== Newcomers ===
Newcomers section
Song	Artist(s)	Songwriter(s)	Rank	Notes
"Semplice sai"	Jenny B	Frank Minoia; Giovanna Bersola	1	Winner of the Newcomers' section; Winner of the Mia Martini Critics Award - Newcomers' section (shared with Lythium)
"Strade"	Tiromancino & Riccardo Sinigallia	Federico Zampaglione; Riccardo Sinigallia	2	
"Cronaca"	Luna	Claudio Mattone	3	Volare Award for Best Lyrics
"La canzone del perdono"	Andrea Mirò	Enrico Ruggeri; Andrea Mirò	4	
"Chiedi quello che vuoi"	Davide De Marinis	Davide De Marinis; Cinzia Farolfi; Davide Bosio	5	
"Che giorno sarà"	Alfonso Maria Parente	Alfonso Maria Parente	6	
"Noël"	Lythium	Stefano Piro	7	Winner of the Mia Martini Critics Award - Newcomers' section (shared with Jenny B)
"E io ci penso ancora"	Enrico Sognato	Enrico Sognato	8	
"Le margherite"	Marjorie Biondo	Marjorie Biondo; Maurizio Fiorilla	9	
"Ognuno per sé"	Erredieffe	Piero Calabrese	10	
"Fai la tua vita"	Claudio Fiori	Claudio Fiori; Marco Falagiani; Giancarlo Bigazzi	11	
"Ogni ora"	B.A.U.	Cristian Ciampoli	12	
"Un giorno senza fine"	Fabrizio Moro	Fabrizio Moro	13	
"Non ci piove"	Joe Barbieri	Joe Barbieri	14	
"La croce"	Alessio Bonomo	Alessio Bonomo	15	
"Uomo davvero"	Laura Falcinelli	E. Monti; P. M. Benedetti	16	
"Nutriente"	Moltheni	Umberto Giardini	17	
"Nord-est"	Andrea Mazzacavallo	Andrea Pozzan	18	

== Guests ==
Guests
Artist(s)	Song(s)
Eurythmics	"17 Again"
Hevia	"Busindre Reel"
Lene Marlin	"Where I'm Headed"
Aqua	"Cartoon Heroes"
Oasis	"Go Let It Out"
Tina Turner	"Whatever You Need"
Robbie Williams	"She's the One"
Enrique Iglesias	"Be with You"
Youssou N'Dour	"My Hope Is in You"
Sting	"Desert Rose"
Tom Jones	"Sex Bomb"
Bono & The Edge	"The Ground Beneath Her Feet" "All I Want Is You"
Goran Bregović	"Mesečina"

== Broadcasts ==
=== International broadcasts ===
Known details on the broadcasts in each country, including the specific broadcasting stations and commentators are shown in the tables below.

International broadcasters of the Sanremo Music Festival 2000
Country	Broadcaster	Channel(s)	Commentator(s)	Ref(s)
Australia	SBS	SBS TV (Note: Delayed broadcast every Sunday since 9 through 30 April at 12:30 (AEST))		
