= Vieni via con me =

- Presented by: Fabio Fazio, Roberto Saviano
- Country of origin: Italy
- No. of series: 1
- No. of episodes: 4 (list of episodes)

Production
- Producer: Endemol
- Production locations: RAI production centre, Milan, Italy
- Running time: 150 minutes ca.

Original release
- Network: RAI Tre
- Release: 8 November – 27 November 2010

Vieni via con me (Come away with me) is a TV programme presented by Fabio Fazio and Roberto Saviano, broadcast by the Italian public TV channel RAI Tre. The show ran on Monday evenings, from 8 November 2010 to 29 November 2010.

It received exceptional ratings in term of audience and critical response.

== Episodes ==
Date	Episode Number	Audience	TV share	Guests
8 November 2010	1	7,623,000	25.48%	Roberto Benigni, Nichi Vendola, Claudio Abbado, Angela Finocchiaro, Daniele Silvestri
15 November 2010	2	9,031,000	30.21%	Gianfranco Fini, Pierluigi Bersani, Antonio Albanese, Toni Servillo, Paolo Rossi, Beppino Englaro, Mina Welby, Luciano Ligabue, Cristiano De André, Silvio Orlando, Don Andrea Gallo, Avion Travel
22 November 2010	3	9,671,000	31.6%	Corrado Guzzanti, Luca Zingaretti, Emma Bonino, Susanna Camusso, Ivano Fossati, Fiorella Mannoia, Don Giacomo Panizza, Renzo Piano, Manlio Milani, Laura Morante, Joseph Masanka Kwetu, Roberto Maroni, Haroon Javaid, Luigi Manconi, Ilaria Cucchi, David Anzalone, Antonio Cornacchione
29 November 2010	4	8,668,000	29.17%	Francesco De Gregori, Dario Fo, Milena Gabanelli, Pietro Grasso, Daniele Silvestri, Don Luigi Ciotti, Antonio Cornacchione, Paolo Rossi, Elio e le Storie Tese, Ernesto Oliviero, Cecilia Strada, Domenico Starnone, Benedetta Tobagi, Franco Aloisio, Francesco Aureli, Costanza Boccardi, Stefano Bollani, Liliana Centofanti, Francesca Coin
