= Sanremo Music Festival 1998 =

Italian song contest (48th edition)

Dates and venue
- Semi-final 1: 24 February 1998
- Semi-final 2: 25 February 1998
- Semi-final 3: 26 February 1998
- Semi-final 4: 27 February 1998
- Final: 28 February 1998
- Venue: Teatro Ariston; Sanremo, Italy

Organisation
- Broadcaster: Radiotelevisione italiana (RAI)
- Musical director: Gianfranco Lombardi
- Presenters: Raimondo Vianello and Eva Herzigová, Veronica Pivetti

Big Artists section
- Number of entries: 17
- Winner: "Senza te o con te" Annalisa Minetti

Newcomers' section
- Number of entries: 14
- Winner: "Senza te o con te" Annalisa Minetti

The Sanremo Music Festival 1998 (Italian: Festival di Sanremo 1998), officially the 48th Italian Song Festival (48º Festival della canzone italiana), was the 48th annual Sanremo Music Festival, held at the Teatro Ariston in Sanremo in late February 1998 and broadcast by Radiotelevisione italiana (RAI). The show was presented by Raimondo Vianello, supported by Eva Herzigová and Veronica Pivetti.

According to the rules of this edition, the winner and the two runners-up of the Newcomers section were allowed in the final night to compete in the Big Artists section; Annalisa Minetti was eventually able to win both the competitions with the song "Senza te o con te". Piccola Orchestra Avion Travel won the Critics Award with the song "Dormi e sogna", while the duo Eramo & Passavanti won the Critics Award for the Newcomers section. For the newcomers, only the winner was revealed; for the big artists section, initially only the first three positions were announced, while the complete final ranking was disclosed only several weeks after the end of the festival.

The "quality jury", responsible for rewarding best music, best lyrics and best arrangements, consisted of composer Michael Nyman, singer-songwriter Roberto Vecchioni, writer Vincenzo Cerami, record producer Celso Valli and vice-president of Rome-Europe Foundation Monique Vaute.

After every night, Piero Chiambretti and Nino D'Angelo hosted DopoFestival, a talk show about the festival with the participation of singers and journalists.

== Participants and results ==
=== Big Artists ===
Big Artists section
Song	Artist(s)	Songwriter(s)	Rank	Notes
"Senza te o con te"	Annalisa Minetti	Massimo Luca; Paola Palma	1	Winner of the "Big Artists" section
"Amore lontanissimo"	Antonella Ruggiero	Antonella Ruggiero; Roberto Colombo	2	
"Sempre"	Lisa	Guido Morra; Maurizio Fabrizio	3	
"Solo come me"	Paola Turci	Paola Turci; Roberto Casini	4	
"Pathos"	Silvia Salemi	Giampiero Artegiani; Silvia Salemi	5	
"Luce"	Mango featuring Zenîma	Alberto Salerno; Armando Mango; Pino Mango	6	FIMI Award for Best Song
"Un po' di te"	Luca Sepe	Fausto Leali; Enzo Malepasso; Luca Sepe; Michele Schembri	7	
"Lasciarsi un giorno a Roma"	Niccolò Fabi	Cecilia Dazzi; Daniele Sinigallia; Niccolò Fabi; Riccardo Sinigallia	8	
"Un porto nel vento"	Ron	Rosalino Cellamare; Fabio Coppini; Gabriel Zagni	9	
"Canto per te"	Andrea Mingardi	Andrea Mingardi; Maurizio Tirelli	10	
"Sei tu o lei (Quello che voglio)"	Alex Baroni	Alex Baroni; Piero Calabrese; Massimo Calabrese; Marco D'Angelo; Marco Rinalduzzi	11	
"E che mai sarà"	Spagna	Ivana Spagna; Giorgio Spagna	12	
"Dormi e sogna"	Piccola Orchestra Avion Travel	Peppe Servillo; Mimì Ciaramella; Peppe D'Argenzio; Fausto Mesolella; Ferruccio Spinetti; Mario Tronco	13	Mia Martini Critics Award; Volare Award for Best Music; Volare Award for Best Arrangement
"Flamingo"	Sergio Caputo	Sergio Caputo	14	
"Sotto il velo del cielo"	Nuova Compagnia di Canto Popolare	Carlo Faiello; Corrado Sfogli	15	
"Per te"	Paola e Chiara	Chiara Iezzi; Paola Iezzi	16	
"Quando un musicista ride"	Enzo Jannacci	Enzo Jannacci	17	Volare Award for Best Lyrics

=== Newcomers ===
Newcomers section
Song	Artist(s)	Songwriter(s)	Notes
"Senza te o con te"	Annalisa Minetti	Massimo Luca; Paola Palma	Winner of the Newcomers' section - Admitted to the "Big Artists" competition
"Sempre"	Lisa	Guido Morra; Maurizio Fabrizio	1st Runner up - Admitted to the "Big Artists" competition
"Un po' di te"	Luca Sepe	Fausto Leali; Enzo Malepasso; Luca Sepe; Michele Schembri	2nd Runner up - Admitted to the "Big Artists" competition
"Ascoltami"	Paola Folli	Francesco Rapaccioli	
"Come il sole"	Percentonetto	Fabio Frombolini; Andrea Amati; Paolo Amati	
"Compagna segreta"	Costa	Marco Costantini	
"Con il naso in su"	Taglia 42	Saverio Grandi	
"Dimmi dov'è la strada per il paradiso"	Alessandro Pitoni	Alessandro Pitoni; Giancarlo Capo	
"I ragazzi innamorati"	Nitti e Agnello	Fabrizio Nitti; Paolo Agnello	
"Il soffio"	Luciferme	Francesco Pisaneschi; Giacomo Guatteri	
"Quante volte sei"	Serena C	Alex Baroni; Piero Calabrese; Massimo Calabrese; Marco Rinalduzzi; Marco D'Angelo; Stefano Conenna	
"Senza confini"	Eramo & Passavanti	Bungaro; Pino Romanelli	Mia Martini Critics Award Newcomers Section; Best Vocal Performance Award
"Siamo noi"	Federico Stragà	Daniele Fossati	
"Un graffio in più"	Liliana Tamberi	Giancarlo Bigazzi; Marco Falagiani; Liliana Tamberi	

== Guests ==
Guests
Artist(s)	Song(s)
Madonna	"Frozen"
Robbie Robertson	"Unbound"
All Saints	"Never Ever"
Michael Bolton	"Nessun dorma"
Shola Ama	"You're the One I Love"
Backstreet Boys	"As Long as You Love Me" "All I Have to Give"
Álvaro Scaramelli	"Soy tal qual soy"
Ricky Martin	"La Copa De La Vida"
Jimmy Page & Robert Plant	"Most High"
Celine Dion	"The Reason" "My Heart Will Go On"
Aqua	"Doctor Jones"
Bryan Adams	"Back to You"
José Feliciano	"Che sarà" "El Americano"
