= Brunori Sas =

Italian singer-songwriter (born 1977)

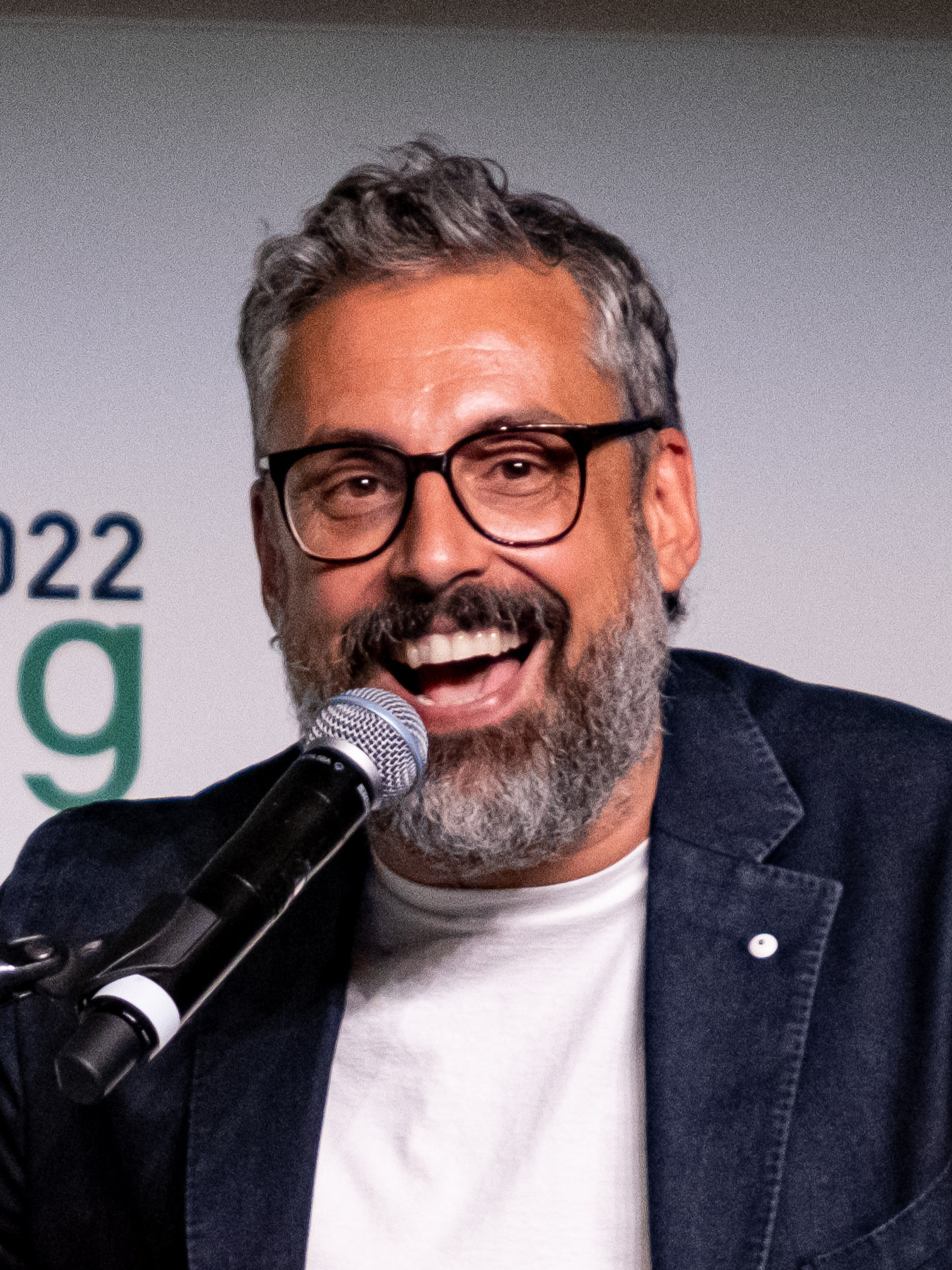
- Brunori Sas in 2022

Background information
- Born: Dario Brunori; 28 September 1977 (age 48); Cosenza, Italy
- Genres: Indie pop
- Occupations: Singer; songwriter
- Instruments: Vocals; guitar; piano
- Years active: 2003–present
- Labels: Picicca Dischi; Universal Music; Island Records

Dario Brunori (born 28 September 1977), known professionally as Brunori Sas, is an Italian singer, songwriter, and multi-instrumentalist. He reached number one on the FIMI albums chart in 2020 with Cip!, his fifth album. He also placed third in the Sanremo Music Festival 2025 with "L'albero delle noci".

== Early life and education ==
Born in Cosenza, Brunori spent his childhood in small towns in Calabria: first in Joggi, a hamlet of Santa Caterina Albanese, and then in Guardia Piemontese. He attended the University of Siena where he obtained a degree in economics and commerce. The name Brunori S.A.S. is a tribute to his parents' construction company.

== Musical career ==
=== Vol. 1 ===
In June 2009, Brunori released his first album Vol.1, containing simple and direct acoustic records that placed him among the emerging Italian indie scene, receiving the "Premio Ciampi" as best debut album. Accompanied by Simona Marrazzo (voice and percussions), Dario Della Rossa (piano and keyboards), Mirko Onofrio (sax and winds) and Massimo Palermo (drums), he promoted the album with a tour composed by over 140 concerts that leads him to win the "KeepOn Live's award" as "Best Live Character of the Season".

=== Vol. 2 – Poveri Cristi and È nata una star? ===
Two years after "Vol. 1" Dario Brunori publishes "Vol. 2 – Poveri Cristi". In this work he aims to describe the life stories of others. The new album has a more articulated structure, thanks to the collaboration with new musicians and the participation of Dente and Dimartino. The song form takes inspiration from the traditional Italian songwriting style. The record marks the entry in the band of the cellist Stefano Amato and inaugurates Picicca Dischi, a new record label that Dario Brunori himself founded with Simona Marrazzo and Matteo Zanobini. In 2012 one of the songs, "Una Domenica Notte", inspires the feature film by Giuseppe Marco Albano in which Dario and the whole band also appear in a cameo.

In the same year, Brunori Sas is the author of the soundtrack of "È nata una star?", a film by Lucio Pellegrini adapted from Nick Hornby's short story Not a star, starring Rocco Papaleo and Luciana Littizzetto. The soundtrack is a collection of unpublished songs and instrumental pieces that became part of a new LP, published by Picicca Dischi in 2013. In this period, Brunori started his career as a producer. His first records with this role are with the artists Maria Antonietta and Dimartino.

=== Vol. 3 – Il cammino di Santiago in taxi and the theatre tour ===
In October 2013, Brunori started the recording of the third album. The following 16 December, the date and title of his third studio album were announced: "Vol.3 – Il Cammino di Santiago in taxi, which was released on 4 February 2014. The album was recorded in a convent in Belmonte Calabro with Japanese producer Taketo Gohara. On 7 January the video of the first single "Kurt Cobain", dedicated to the singer of Nirvana, is released. The album debuts in fifth position in the FIMI sales chart, in second place on iTunes and in first place on Spotify as the most listened to artist. Brunori Sas participated to the Concerto del Primo Maggio in Rome. In June, Ligabue chooses Brunori Sas as the open act for the concerts in Milan (San Siro Stadium) and Rome (Stadio Olimpico).

=== A Casa Tutto Bene, the TV show "Brunori Sa" and Sanremo 2019 ===
On 24 November 2016, with an online article on the newspaper Il Sole 24 ore, Dario Brunori anticipates the themes of his new album, announced on 5 December 2016 by Brunori himself with the title "A casa tutto bene" (Picicca Dischi). "These are songs that have to do with the need to face small and big daily fears and with the natural tendency to seek shelter, a refuge, a place to feel safe". On 16 December 2016 the single "La Verità" is released, followed by the launch of the new music video created by Giacomo Triglia on the same day. The album "A Casa Tutto Bene" is released on 20 January 2017, placing third in FIMI sales and first on the digital platforms iTunes and Spotify. FIMI will certify "La Verità" as Golden Single and "A Casa Tutto Bene" Gold Record. The album was recorded in San Marco Argentano at the "Masseria Perugini".

The winter live tour started on 24 February 2017 from Udine, registering the sold-out on all 18 dates on the calendar, including the participation as a headline group at the "Primo Maggio" Concert in Piazza San Giovanni in Rome. On 16 June 2017 the summer tour covered 18 dates in Italy, starting from Padua. On 27 July 2017 he won "Pimi Speciale" prize of Mei, the meeting dedicated to Italian independent music, as the best independent artist of the year. On 1 August 2017 FIMI certifies "La Verità" gold record. On 2 September 2017, the video for the single La Verità, written by Dario Brunori and directed by Giacomo Triglia, wins the Mei's "Pivi 2017" award as the best independent video of the year. On 1 July 2018 the FIMI certifies "Canzone Contro La Paura" as gold record. On 13 August 2018 the FIMI certifies "A Casa Tutto Bene" platinum record.

On 28 June 2017, the Italian national broadcaster announces that Brunori will conduct a show called "Brunori Sa", broadcast from 6 April in the late evening on Rai 3 channel. On the same day, Brunori announces the new theatrical tour "Brunori a teatro – canzoni e monologhi sull'incertezza" starting in February 2018.

On 6 April 2018, the first episode of Brunori Sa is on air on Rai 3. The show, structured in five episodes, talk about desires, fears and apparent contradictions of the generation of forty-year-olds to whom he belongs. There are five existential themes: health, home, work, relationships and God.

On 8 February 2019 Dario Brunori is on the stage of the Teatro Ariston in Sanremo Music Festival 2019 on the occasion of the evening dedicated to duets. Brunori performs with Zen Circus the song "L'amore è una dittatura", reaching the seventeenth place in the final ranking.

=== Cip! and the live tour in the halls ===
On 18 September 2019 the new single "Al di là dell'amore" is released. A tour in concert halls is also announced., starting in March 2020, while the music video of "Al di là dell'amore", written by Dario Brunori and directed by Giacomo Triglia, is released on 27 September. The single anticipates the release of the songwriter's fifth studio album, titled "Cip!", announced by Brunori on 4 December 2019 through a post on his Instagram profile. The album is released on 10 January 2020 for the Island Records label. The release of the second single from the album, "Per due che come noi", is also announced for 13 December 2019, simultaneously with the music video directed by Duccio Chiarini.

On 9 March 2020 FIMI certifies "Cip!" as gold record with over 25,000 copies sold.

On 8 June 2020 FIMI certifies "Per due come noi" as gold record with over 35,000 copies sold.

On 1 February 2021 FIMI certifies "Al di là dell'amore" as gold record with over 35,000 copies sold.

=== 2024–present ===
In December 2024, Brunori Sas was announced as one of the participants in the Sanremo Music Festival 2025. He placed third with the song "L'albero delle noci", which was also awarded for the best lyrics by the musical commission.

== Discography ==
=== Albums ===
Title	Year	Peak chart positions	Certifications
Title	Year	ITA	Certifications
Vol. 1	2009	—	
Vol. 2 – Poveri cristi	2011	98	
Vol. 3 – Il cammino di Santiago in taxi	2014	5	
A casa tutto bene	2017	3	FIMI: 2× Platinum
Cip! (re-issued as Baby Cip in 2021)	2020	1	FIMI: Platinum
L'albero delle noci	2025	2	

=== Singles ===
Title	Year	Peak chart positions	Certifications	Album
Title	Year	ITA	Certifications	Album
"Mambo reazionario"	2014	—		Vol. 3 – Il cammino di Santiago in taxi
"La verità"	2016	91	FIMI: Platinum	A casa tutto bene
"Lamezia Milano"	2017	—	FIMI: Gold	A casa tutto bene
"Canzone contro la paura"	2017	—	FIMI: Gold	A casa tutto bene
"Al di là dell'amore"	2019	90	FIMI: Gold	Cip!
"Per due che come noi"	2019	27	FIMI: Platinum	Cip!
"Capita così"	2020	65		Cip!
"La ghigliottina"	2024	—		L'albero delle noci
"Il morso di Tyson"	2024	—		L'albero delle noci
"L'albero delle noci"	2025	11		L'albero delle noci
