= Spaccacuore =

1995 song by Samuele Bersani

Single by Samuele Bersani

from the album Freak
- Released: 1995
- Genre: Pop
- Length: 4:25
- Label: Pressing
- Songwriters: Samuele Bersani, Lucio Dalla, Giuseppe D'Onghia
- Producer: Giuseppe D'Onghia

Samuele Bersani singles chronology
"Freak" (1995)	"Spaccacuore" (1995)	"Cosa vuoi da me" (1995)

Music video
- "Spaccacuore" on YouTube

"Spaccacuore" is a song written by Italian singer-songwriters Samuele Bersani and Lucio Dalla, together with Giuseppe D'Onghia. The song was recorded by Bersani for his 1995 second studio set Freak, and it was released as the album's second single in that same year. The song later became one of his best-known songs in Italy.

The song was covered by various artists, including Laura Pausini, who released it as the second single from Io canto in 2007. She also recorded a Spanish-language version of the song, under the title "Dispárame, dispara".

== Samuele Bersani version ==
=== Background and release ===
Samuele Bersani wrote the song for his second studio album, Freak, which was released in 1995. He composed the music with Giuseppe D'Onghia, while the lyrics were written by Bersani with popular singer-songwriter Lucio Dalla. "Spaccacuore" describes the feelings of a man who is experiencing the end of a love relationship. The song, produced and arranged by Giuseppe D'Onghia, was released as the album's second single in 1995.

Its release was anticipated by Bersani's label because the album's first single, "Freak", included lyrics citing the Italian centre-right political area, as well as the Italian Communist Party, therefore its promotion was stopped by some Italian radio stations due to the Fairness Doctrine policy during the electoral campaign which preceded 1995's Italian local and regional elections.

=== Media appearances ===
It was featured on the soundtrack of 2001's film Chiedimi se sono felice, starring Italian comedians Aldo, Giovanni & Giacomo, who also directed it together with Massimo Venier. It was also included in Bersani's compilation albums Che vita!, released in 2002, and Psyco – 20 anni di canzoni, published in 2012.

Bersani performed the song during 1995's itinerant music show Festivalbar, broadcast in Italy by Mediaset TV channel Italia 1.

=== Track listing ===
CD single (1995)

1. "Spaccacuore" – 4:25

== Charts and certifications ==
=== Weekly charts ===
Chart (2007)	Peak position
Italy Digital Downloads (FIMI)	31

=== Certifications ===
Region	Certification	Certified units/sales
Italy (FIMI)	Gold	25,000^{‡}
^{‡} Sales+streaming figures based on certification alone.

== Laura Pausini version ==
"Spaccacuore"

Single by Laura Pausini

from the album Io canto
- Released: 19 January 2007
- Recorded: 2006 – Hanson Recording Studios, Hollywood, Los Angeles, California; O.R.S. Oliveta Recording Studios, Castelbolognese, Ravenna, Italy; Sage Studio, Los Angeles, California
- Genre: Pop
- Length: 4:09
- Label: Atlantic Records
- Songwriters: Samuele Bersani, Lucio Dalla, Giuseppe D'Onghia
- Producers: Laura Pausini, Daniel Vuletic

Laura Pausini singles chronology
"Io canto" (2006)	"Spaccacuore" (2007)	"Non me lo so spiegare" (2007)

Music video
- "Spaccacuore" on YouTube

Laura Pausini also recorded a cover of the song for her album Io canto, released in 2006. The song was chosen as the album's second single on 19 January 2007. The Spanish-language version of the song, titled "Dispárame, dispara" and featured on the Hispanic version of the album, Yo canto, was the first single from the set, and it was chosen as the opening theme of the Mexican telenovela Amar sin límites.

The Spanish-language version is also included on the Spanish edition of Pausini's second compilation album, 20 – Grandes Éxitos.

=== Live performances ===
Laura Pausini performed the Spanish-language version of the song during her concert at the San Siro stadium in Milan, on 2 June 2007. This performance was later featured on the video album recorded during the concert, San Siro 2007. The two versions of her 2009's album, Laura Live World Tour 09 and Laura Live Gira Mundial 09, also include a Spanish-language and an Italian-language live version of the song, respectively.

=== Music video ===
The music video for the song, with a total length of 4 minutes and 8 seconds, was directed by Gaetano Morbioli. During the video, Pausini is shown while moving in a few centimeters of water, while a video wall in the background shows images creating a dark atmosphere.

=== Controversy ===
Immediately after the release of the album, Bersani commented on Pausini's version of the song stating: "It's obvious that I'm happy. 'Spaccacuore', which is ten years old now, is somehow living for a second time". Despite this, in an interview released in March 2007 during Rai Radio 2's programma Viva Radio 2, presented by Rosario Fiorello and Marco Baldini, Bersani criticized Pausini's version of the song: "I don't like the version of 'Spaccacuore' by Laura Pausini". He also explained that he considered its arrangement as too baroque and he expressed disappointment for the decision to feature the song on Mexican telenovela Amar sin límites.

Pausini commented on Bersani's interview a few days later, talking to la Repubblica's journalist Gino Castaldo: "He can tell whatever he wants, of course. But it looks strange because, when the album was released, he told that he liked the song very much. [...] Yes, I did it my way, but it's natural. I heard Bersani, and we cleared things up with each other, we are talking". She also added "The song became the opening theme of a South American telenovela, but I know that Bersani, during his concert, laughs on it, blaming it on me instead of recognizing me this merit. But it's strange, because when a song is chosen as the theme for a TV programme, it is necessary to have the consensus from the author". Bersani later commented that he was criticizing the choices of promotion strategies and arrangement made by Pausini's staff, and not her rendition of the song, adding that "journalists want to see blood whatever it takes, but I don't want to play that game".

=== Track listing ===
Digital download – "Spaccacuore" (2007)

1. "Spaccacuore" – 4:09

Digital download – "Dispárame, dispara" (2007)

1. "Dispárame, dispara" – 4:09

=== Personnel ===
Music credits

- John Beasley – piano, keyboards
- Paul Bushnell – bass
- Vinnie Colaiuta – drums
- Samuele Dessì – guitar
- Giancarlo Di Maria – string arrangement
- Bruce Dukow – concert master
- Suzie Katayama – string contractor
- Michael Landau – guitar
- Raphael Padilla – percussions
- Laura Pausini – vocals
- Celso Valli – string arrangement, string director
- Daniel Vuletic – programming, guitar, piano, keyboards, backing vocals, arrangement, string arrangement

Production credits

- Marco Borsatti – engineer
- Samuele Dessì – pre-producer
- Nicola Fantozzi – assistant
- Matt Serrecchio – assistant
- Francesco Luzzi – mixing
- Laura Pausini – producer
- Luca Pellegrini – assistant
- Saverio Principi – engineer
- Tom Syrowsky – assistant
- Michael Tacci – engineer
- Daniel Vuletic – pre-producer, producer

=== Charts ===
Chart (2007)	Peak position
Italy Airplay (Music Control)	4
Italy Digital Downloads (FIMI)	14

== Other cover versions ==
The song was covered in 1997 by Paola Turci for the album Oltre le nuvole, entirely composed of covers. Massimo Ranieri also recorded a cover of the song, including it in his album Canzoni in corso, released in 1997.
