= L'albero delle noci =

2025 album by Brunori Sas

Studio album by Brunori Sas
- Released: 14 February 2025
- Genre: Pop
- Length: 33:21
- Label: Universal
- Producer: Riccardo Sinigallia

Brunori Sas chronology
Cip! (2020)	L'albero delle noci (2025)

Singles from L'albero delle noci
- 1. "La ghigliottina" Released: 19 September 2024; 2. "Il morso di Tyson" Released: 18 November 2024; 3. "L'albero delle noci" Released: 12 February 2025

L'albero delle noci is the sixth studio album by Italian singer and songwriter Brunori Sas, released on 14 February 2025 via Universal.

== Background and promotion ==
The album's title is inspired by a walnut tree located in front of Brunori's house, which the artist often observes during the creative process, considering it a source of inspiration for his songs. The central theme of the album is fatherhood, with particular attention to the contrasting emotions that it entails: from the joy and wonder for the birth of a new life, to the fears and insecurities related to the role of parent. Brunori dedicates this work to his daughter Fiammetta, born in October 2021, exploring how her birth has profoundly transformed his perspective on life and love.

On 19 September 2024, he released the first single for "La ghigliottina". On 18 November, Sas released the second single "Il morso di Tyson". The title track, the third single, was presented at the Sanremo Music Festival 2025.

== Track listing ==
All lyrics are written by Dario Brunori; all music is composed by Riccardo Sinigallia.

No.	Title	Length
1.	"Per non perdere noi"	3:39
2.	"L'albero delle noci"	3:56
3.	"La ghigliottina"	3:42
4.	"La vita com'è"	3:20
5.	"Pomeriggi catastrofici"	2:42
6.	"Il morso di Tyson"	4:00
7.	"Fin'ara luna"	2:39
8.	"Più acqua che fuoco"	3:03
9.	"Luna nera"	3:52
10.	"Guardia giurata"	2:23
Total length:		33:21

== Charts ==
Chart performance for L'albero delle noci
Chart (2025)	Peak position
Italian Albums (FIMI)	2

== Certifications ==
Region	Certification	Certified units/sales
Italy (FIMI)	Gold	25,000^{‡}
^{‡} Sales+streaming figures based on certification alone.
