= Quelli che benpensano =

Single by Frankie Hi-NRG MC featuring Riccardo Sinigallia

from the album La morte dei miracoli
- Released: 1997
- Recorded: 1997
- Genre: Conscious hip hop, political hip hop
- Length: 4:05 (radio edit); 4:13 (album version)
- Label: Sony Music
- Songwriters: Sebastiano Ruocco, Giulia Puzzo, Francesco Di Gesù
- Producers: Ice One, Julie P.

Frankie Hi-NRG MC singles chronology
"Fili" (1997)	"Quelli che benpensano" (1997)	"Autodafè" (1998)

"Quelli che benpensano" (Italian pronunciation: [ˈkwelli ke bbemˈpɛnsano]) is a song by Italian rapper Frankie Hi-NRG MC, released in 1997 as the third single from his second studio album La morte dei miracoli, of the same year. The refrain of the song is sung by fellow Italian singer-songwriter Riccardo Sinigallia.

== Title meaning ==
The title can translate as "the right-thinking ones", and it is modelled after the Italian word benpensante, meaning "conformist". In turn, such word is composed by ben – an apocopic form of bene, meaning "well, good, right", and pensante ("thinking one"), from the verb pensare ("to think"). Therefore, the title carries an ironic shade, since the people described in the song do not act in a good way (see below).

== Background ==
The song is a political and social denounce: it criticizes the vices and hypocrisy of the upper middle and upper classes, the capitalist culture and the attitude of social and political careerism of the so-called yuppies (a figure which was very present in the society of the 1980s and early 1990s). In particular, it is critical towards social climbers: figures who display rampant consumerism, exclusively interested in appearance, money and success and lacking qualms and morals. In the lyrics, they are defined "like lizards [who] climb", for whom "the imperative is to win and not let anyone else participate", because "in the logic of the game the only rule is to be shrewd".
The track also references a biblical quote from Saint Matthew's Parable of the Workers in the Vineyard, but edited: "the last will be last, if the first are unreachable".

In 1998, the song was awarded as the best Italian song of 1997 at Premio italiano della musica and has been certified double platinum in Italy.

It also features samples from the songs "Dawn Comes Alone", composed by Jack Arel and performed by French singer Nicole Croisille (under the pseudonym Tuesday Jackson) for the soundtrack of the film The Young Wolves, and "Blue Juice", composed by Jimmy McGriff.

In 2023, Italian deputy and anti-mafia activist Francesco Emilio Borrelli quoted the song during a speech in the Parliament.

== Tracklist ==
Lyrics and music by Sebastiano Ruocco, Giulia Puzzo and Francesco Di Gesù.

Promotional CD

No.	Title	Length
1.	"Quelli che benpensano" (Radio edit)	4:05

12"

- A Side

No.	Title	Length
1.	"Quelli che benpensano" (Album Version)	4:13
2.	"Quelli che benpensano" (Ice One Remix)	4:13
3.	"Quelli che benpensano" (DJ Stile Remix)	4:15

- B Side

No.	Title	Length
4.	"Quelli che benpensano" (Album Version Instrumental)	4:13
5.	"Quelli che benpensano" (Ice One Remix Instrumental)	4:13
6.	"Quelli che benpensano" (DJ Stile Remix Instrumental)	4:15

== Cover versions and remixes ==
Various versions of the song have been made, such as the remix by Ice One also included in the album La morte dei miracoli.

In 2012, Italian singer Fiorella Mannoia released a new version of the song as a duet with Frankie himself. It was the first single from her live album Sud il tour (also 2012); this version runs 5:11.

== Charts ==
Chart (1997)	Highest position
Italy (FIMI)	8

== Certifications ==
Region	Certification	Certified units/sales
Italy (FIMI) Sales since 2009	Platinum	50,000^{‡}
^{‡} Sales+streaming figures based on certification alone.
