= L'albero delle noci (song) =

2025 single by Brunori Sas

Single by Brunori Sas

from the album L'albero delle noci
- Released: 12 February 2025
- Genre: Traditional pop
- Length: 3:56
- Label: Universal Music Italy
- Composer: Riccardo Sinigallia
- Lyricist: Dario Brunori
- Producer: Riccardo Sinigallia

Brunori Sas singles chronology
"Il morso di Tyson" (2024)	"L'albero delle noci" (2025)	"Per non perdere noi" (2025)

"L'albero delle noci" ("The Walnut Tree") is a single by the Italian singer-songwriter Brunori Sas, released on 12 February 2025 as the third single from his sixth studio album of the same name. The song was presented in competition at the Sanremo Music Festival 2025 where it ranked third. On the same occasion, it won the Sergio Bardotti Award for best lyrics.

== Background ==
The song, written by Sas himself and produced by Riccardo Sinigallia, is dedicated by Sas to his daughter Fiammetta, born in 2021, and describes how her birth changed his life. In this regard, he stated in an interview on RaiPlay:

The walnut tree is in front of my house. I always look at it when something buzzes in my head, also because for years I have been convinced that it is he who suggests the songs I write. On the other hand, not having trees, especially the centuries-old ones, any interest in Siae reports, it seemed right to me to at least pay tribute to him with a song. And I am happy to have done it with a song that makes my heart sweet and in which I courageously tried to sing the joy, but also the restlessness that a new birth brings with it.

The sounds of the song have been compared to those of Francesco De Gregori.

== Music video ==
The music video was directed by Giacomo Triglia, produced by Borotalco TV and with the contribution of Calabria Film Commission, and is partially inspired by Béla Tarr's film, Werckmeister Harmonies. Set in a room decorated for a birthday party, it opens with Brunori holding his daughter's hand as she walks on some tables. Then, after the little girl puts on a Sun-shaped mask, the two begin to dance a waltz together with the rest of the artist's family, amidst a series of reproductions of the Solar System.

== Sanremo Music Festival 2025 ==
Italian broadcaster RAI organised the 75th edition of the Sanremo Music Festival between 11 and 15 February 2025. As had been the case since 2015, the winner would earn the right of first refusal to represent Italy at the upcoming Eurovision Song Contest.

On 1 December 2024, Sas was announced among the participants of the festival, with the title of his competing entry revealed the following 18 December. The song finished in third place, which was also awarded for the best lyrics by the musical commission.

== Charts ==
=== Weekly charts ===
Chart performance for "L'albero delle noci"
Chart (2025)	Peak position
Italy (FIMI)	11
Italy Airplay (EarOne)	19

=== Year-end charts ===
Year-end chart performance for "L'albero delle noci"
Chart (2025)	Position
Italy (FIMI)	83

== Certifications ==
Certifications for "L'albero delle noci"
Region	Certification	Certified units/sales
Italy (FIMI)	Gold	100,000^{‡}
^{‡} Sales+streaming figures based on certification alone.
