= Niccolò Fabi =

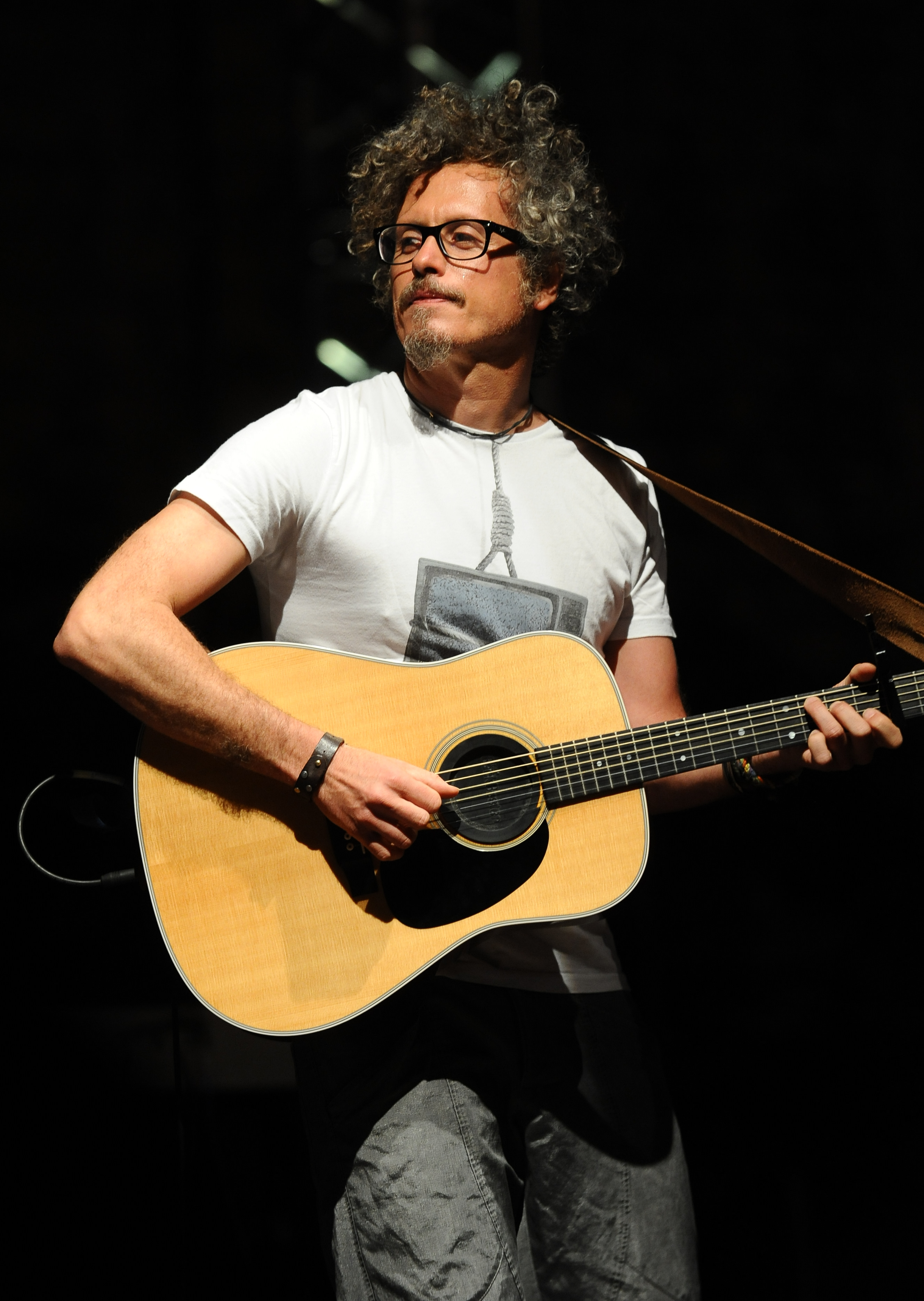
- Fabi performing in Trento in 2012

Background information
- Born: 16 May 1968 (age 58); Rome, Italy
- Genres: Pop
- Occupations: Musician; singer-songwriter
- Instruments: Vocals; guitar
- Years active: 1995–present
- Labels: Virgin Records (1996–2008); Universal Music (2009–present)
- Website: niccolofabi.it

Niccolò Fabi (born 16 May 1968) is an Italian singer-songwriter. He rose to national fame after competing in the Newcomers' section of the Sanremo Music Festival 1997, receiving the Mia Martini Critics' Award for his entry "Capelli".

As of 2026, he has released eleven studio albums and a greatest hits album in Italy, as well as two compilation albums for the Hispanic market. During his career, Fabi also received two Lunezia Awards for the album "La cura del tempo" and for the song "Costruire".

== Early life ==
Niccolò Fabi was born in Rome on 16 May 1968. His father, Claudio Fabi, was a record producer mainly active in the 1970s, when he was the artistic director of Lucio Battisti's label Numero Uno, producing artists including the Premiata Forneria Marconi and Alberto Fortis. When he was 5 years old, he started studying piano and classical music. In 1981, he started playing drums. He later entered a band performing songs by artists such as Earth, Wind & Fire, and he also became the drummer of the Fall Out, a Police cover band.

He started writing songs at the age of 14. In 1986, Fabi also worked as a stage assistant during a tour by Alberto Fortis, tuning his guitars. In 1994, Fabi graduated in Philology.

== Music career ==
=== 1996–1997: breakthrough ===
Fabi released his first single, "Dica", in 1996. Thanks to the success of the song, the following year he took part in the Sanremo Music Festival, competing in the Newcomers' section with the song "Capelli". The song received the Mia Martini Critics' Award in its category. Shortly after the competition, Fabi released his debut album, Il giardiniere, which sold more than 100,000 copies in Italy.

Thanks to the success of his first album, in April 1998 Fabi received a nomination for Revelation of the Year at the Premio Italiano della Musica, sponsored by the Italian radio network Radio DeeJay and the music magazine Musica!.

=== 1998: second studio album ===
In 1998, Fabi competed once again in the Sanremo Music Festival, performing the song "Lasciarsi un giorno a Roma" in the "Big Artists" section. The song was chosen as the lead single from Fabi's second studio set, released by Virgin Records on 10 April 1998. The album also includes "Vento d'estate", a duet with Max Gazzè, which was performed won the music competition Un disco per l'estate. As of February 1999, the album had sold 80,000 copies in Italy.

=== 2000–2001: Sereno ad ovest and Spanish-language debut ===
In 2000, Fabi released his third studio album, preceded by the single "Se fossi Marco". The single was also performed during the itinerant music competition Festivalbar, held throughout Italy during the summer of 2000 on broadcast by Italia 1.

In 2001, Fabi also released his first album for the Hispanic maret. The self-titled set is a compilation album composed of tracks from Il giardiniere and Niccolò Fabi, including five Spanish language adaptation of his best-known hits.

=== 2003–2005: La cura del tempo ===
In January 2003, Fabi released the single "È non è", preceding his third studio album, La cura del tempo. The album also includes "Offeso", a duet with Fiorella Mannoia. Italian jazz musician Stefano di Battista also appears playing sax on the tracks "Il negozio di antiquariato" and "Ora e qui".

In 2004, he took part in the music festival O'Scià, organized by Claudio Baglioni in Lampedusa in order to bring attention to the illegal immigration phenomenon affecting the southernmost Italian island. Two years later, Fabi recorded a duet with Edoardo Bennato. The song, "Non è amore", was included in Bennato's album La fantastica storia del pifferaio magico.

=== 2006–2007: Novo Mesto and compilation albums ===
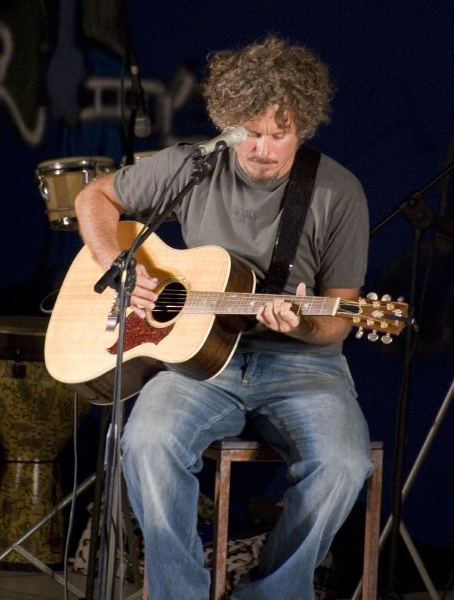
Niccolò Fabi performing in Ancona, Italy, on 14 August 2006

Niccolò Fabi's fifth studio album was released in February 2006. Titled Novo Mesto, it was named after the Slovenian city in which it was recorded. The album was preceded by the single "Costruire", released on 23 December 2005. In 2012, the song won the Lunezia Award in the section "Elite Award".

In order to celebrate the tenth anniversary of Fabi's debut single, his first compilation album, Dischi volanti 96-06, was released in November 2006. The standard edition of the album is composed of two CDs, but a deluxe edition with an additional DVD was also released. The only new song of the album, "Milioni di giorni", was released as a single. It was also chosen as one of the ten finalists of the Premio Amnesty Italia Voices for Freedom in 2007, a prize recognizing songs with lyrics focusing on social themes.

In 2007, Fabi also released his second album for the Spanish market. Titled Dentro, it included both Italian-language tracks taken from his previous works and Spanish-language adaptations of previously released songs. During the same year, he also appeared on the album Adelantando by Spanish band Jarabe de Palo, performing the Italian version of the song "Me gusta como eres", titled "Mi piace come sei".

=== 2008–2009: Violenza 124 and Solo un uomo ===
In 2008, Fabi produced the project Violenza 124, featuring Italian artists with different musical styles and backgrounds. The involved artists, beside Fabi himself, are Subsonica's keyboardist Boosta, pop-rock singer-songwriter Roberto Angelini, strings group Gnu Quartet, post-rock band Mokadelic and the duo composed of Olivia Salvadori and Franco Mussida, two artists mixing opera with electronic music. Each one of them was asked to independently develop the same basic idea on the theme of violence, and Fabi later mixed the produced results in a 36-minutes-long song which was released both as a freely available track on the Web and as a double CD, also including the original contributions of the involved artists as separate tracks.

In 2009, he was among the 56 artists composing the supergroup Artisti Uniti per l'Abruzzo. The band recorded the song "Domani 21/04.09", a cover of Mauro Pagani's "Domani" released as a charity single to raise funds in support of the victims of the 2009 L'Aquila earthquake.

After splitting with Virgin Records, which released all his previous albums, Fabi signed a new contract with Universal Music, which released Fabi's sixth studio album, Solo un uomo, in May 2010. The single with the same title was released to Italian radio stations on 17 April 2009. Fabi later revealed he submitted the song for the Sanremo Music Festival 2009, it was rejected by the jury during the internal selection.

=== Parole di Lulù and Ecco ===
In July 2010, Fabi's daughter, Olivia, died from a meningococcal meningitis. After canceling his scheduled tour, Fabi decided to organize a mega-concert in her memory, involving several Italian singers and friends, including Elisa, Jovanotti, Fiorella Mannoia, Giuliano Sangiorgi, Max Gazzè, Daniele Silvestri, Samuele Bersani and Subsonica. All the proceedings from the concert were donated to build a children's hospital in Angola. The concert was also released as a DVD, which also contributed raising funds for the same purpose. The DVD, titled Parole per Lulù, also included the track "Parole parole", recorded in studio with Mina and released as a single.

In 2011, Fabi penned the song "Lontano da tutto", performed by Serena Abrami during the 61st Sanremo Music Festival, and the track "Nel primo sguardo", performed by Laura Pausini as a duet with her sister Silvia and included in the album Inedito.

Niccolò Fabi's seventh studio album, Ecco, was released on 9 October 2012. The album, featuring guest appearances by artists including trumpeter Roy Paci and singer-songwriter Roberto Angelini, was preceded by the single "Una buona idea". Ecco debuted at number 3 on the Italian Albums Chart, becoming his first top ten album.

=== Fabi-Silvestri-Gazzè and Una somma di piccole cose ===
In 2014, Fabi started the musical project Fabi-Silvestri-Gazzè together with Daniele Silvestri and Max Gazzè. The trio released a studio album (Il padrone della festa), a live album (l padrone della festa – Live) and made an extensive tour in Italy and Europe.

In April 2016, Fabi released his eighth studio album, Una somma di piccole cose. The album peaked at the first place on the Italian hit parade.

On October 11, 2019, he released his eleventh album, Tradizione e tradimento, which composed of nine songs.

=== 2024–2025: ===
In early 2025, he announced the release of his new album Libertà negli occhi, followed by a tour in October and November on stages in 17 Italian cities.

== Personal life ==
Fabi lives with his partner Shirin Amini, an Italian painter of Iranian origins. In 2008, Shirin gave birth to the couple's first daughter, Olivia. Nicknamed Lulubella, she died on 4 July 2010 from a meningococcal meningitis. After canceling the scheduled summer tour, Fabi confirmed his daughter's death through his Facebook account.

The couple's second child, Kim, was born on 17 September 2012.

== Discography ==
=== Albums ===
==== Studio albums ====
List of albums, with chart positions and certifications
Title	Album details	Chart positions	Certifications
Title	Album details	ITA	Certifications
Il giardiniere	Released: 1997; Label: Virgin Records; Formats: CD	15	FIMI: Platinum
Niccolò Fabi	Released: 1998; Label: Virgin Records; Formats: CD	22	FIMI: Gold
Sereno ad ovest	Released: 21 April 2000; Label: Virgin Records; Formats: CD	—	
La cura del tempo	Released: 3 February 2003; Label: Virgin Records; Formats: CD	12	
Novo mesto	Released: 3 February 2006; Label: Virgin Records; Formats: CD, digital download	11	
Solo un uomo	Released: 29 May 2009; Label: Universal Music; Formats: CD, digital download	22	
Ecco	Released: 9 October 2012; Label: Universal Music; Formats: CD, digital download	3	
Una somma di piccole cose	Released: 22 April 2016; Label: Universal Music; Formats: CD, digital download	1	FIMI: Gold
Tradizione e tradimento	Released: 11 October 2019; Label: Universal Music; Formats: CD, digital download	2	
Meno per meno	Released: 2 December 2022; Label: BMG Rights Management, Warner; Formats: CD, digital download	12	
Libertà negli occhi	Released: 16 May 2025; Label: BMG Rights Management, Universal; Formats: CD, digital download	6	
"—" denotes albums that did not chart.

==== Compilation albums ====
List of albums, with chart positions and certifications
Title	Album details	Chart positions
Title	Album details	ITA
Niccolò Fabi	Released: 2001 (Spain); Label: EMI; Format: CD	—
Dischi volanti 96-06	Released: 2 November 2006; Label: Virgin Records; Format: CD, digital download	18
Dentro	Released: 6 February 2007 (Spain); Label: Virgin Records; Format: CD, download	—
Diventi Inventi 1997–2017	Released: 13 October 2017; Label: Universal Music; Format: CD, download	3
"—" denotes albums that did not chart or were not released.

== Awards and nominations ==
Year	Award	Nomination	Work	Result
1998	Premio Italiano della Musica	Revelation of the Year	Himself	Nominated
2007	Premio Amnesty Italia	Voices for Freedom	"Milioni di giorni"	Nominated
2003	Lunezia Award	Critics' Award	La cura del tempo	Won
2009	Premio Videoclip Italiano	Best Video by a Male Artist	"Solo un uomo"	Nominated
2012	Lunezia Award	Elite Award	"Costruire"	Won
2013	Nastro d'Argento	Best Original Song	"Il silenzio"	Nominated
2013	Targhe Tenco	Album of the Year	Ecco	Won
