= Frankie Hi-NRG MC =

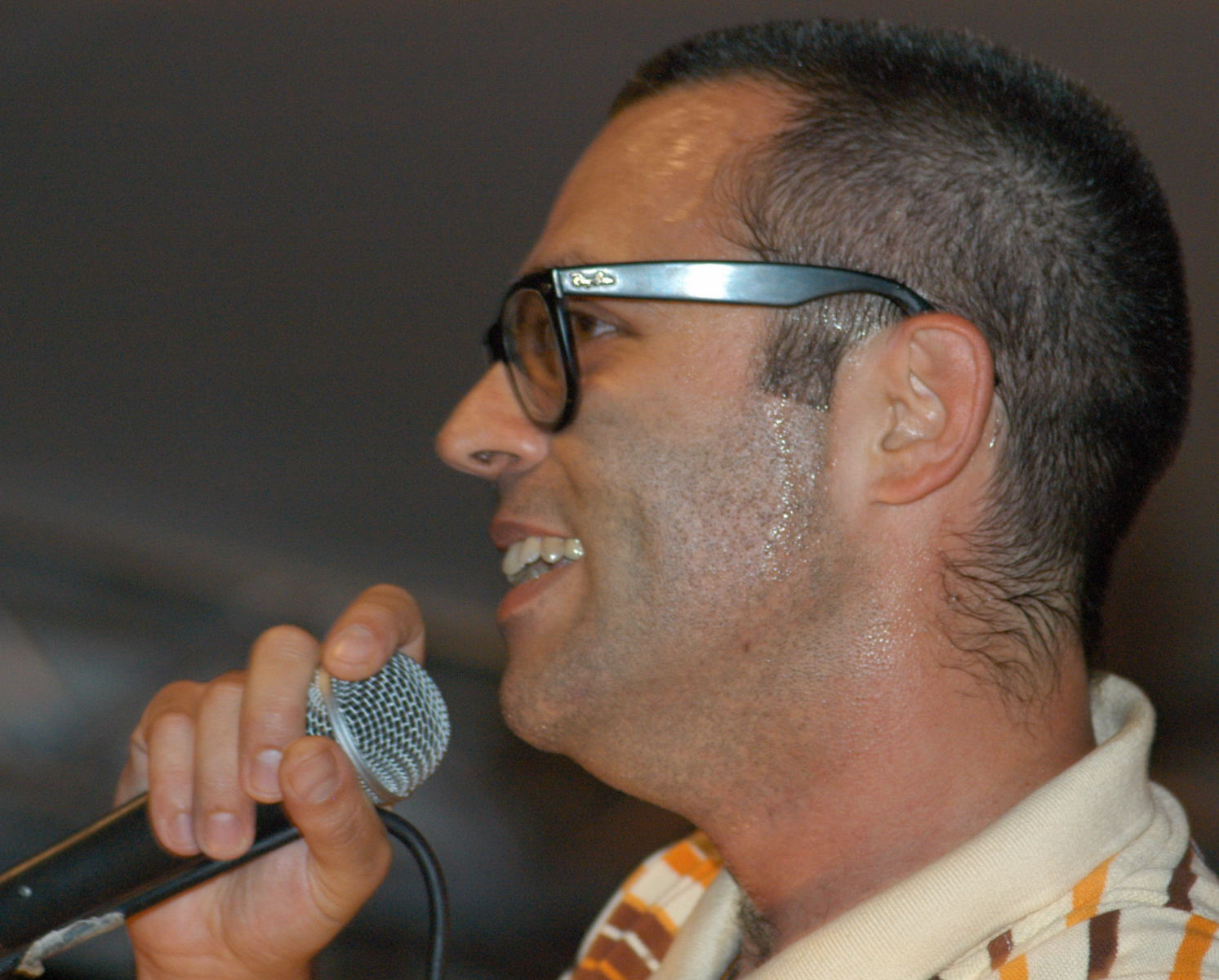
- Frankie Hi-NRG MC singing during the "Horror Vacui" festival in Trento

Background information
- Born: Francesco Di Gesù; 18 July 1969 (age 57); Turin, Italy
- Genre: Hip hop
- Occupations: Rapper; singer; record producer
- Years active: 1991–present
- Label: Sony BMG
- Website: www.frankie.tv

Francesco Di Gesù (Italian pronunciation: [franˈtʃesko di dʒeˈzu]; born 18 July 1969), better known by his stage name Frankie Hi-NRG MC, is an Italian rap and hip hop artist of Sicilian descent, born in Turin and raised between Caserta and Città di Castello. He has been active since the early stages of the Italian hip hop movement in the early 1990s and is regarded as one of the pioneers of the genre. He predominantly discusses politics and societal issues in his music, his debut single "Fight da faida" (Irma Records, 1992) complains about various issues, including the Mafia and its ties with Italian politicians, the Ustica massacre, the Bologna massacre and the Operation Gladio. He has also participated in the Sanremo Music Festival in 2008 with his song "Rivoluzione" and again in 2014 with "Pedala" and "Un uomo è vivo".

He has released six albums, 5 of those albums with RCA and the single "Quelli che benpensano" from his second album La morte dei miracoli was awarded Italian Song Of The Year 1998. In addition he has written for and performed with Italian artists like Fiorella Mannoia, Giorgia and international stars like RZA, Nas, Beastie Boys and Run DMC.

Frankie has expressed himself in other fields, writing and directing music videos. Since 2009 he has been an independent artist, releasing his latest album Essere Umani in 2014 on the Materie Prime Circolari snc label.

Furthermore, his album "La morte dei miracoli" boasts 39th place in the best albums according to Rolling Stone.

== Collaborations ==
He has collaborated with Italian and international artists (in addition to those included in his albums):

- Nas (Hate Me Now remix)
- RZA (Passaporto per resistere)
- La Comitiva with Ice one, Malaisa and Elisa (Nottetempo)
- Shel Shapiro (Che colpa abbiamo noi)
- Daniele Silvestri (Kunta kinte)
- Tiromancino (Roma di notte)
- Paola Cortellesi (Non mi chiedermi, Pugni in tasca)
- Caparezza (Quelli che benpensano (live))

== Discography ==
- 1993 – Verba manent
- 1997 – La morte dei miracoli
- 2003 – Ero un autarchico
- 2005 – Rap©ital
- 2008 – DePrimoMaggio
- 2014 – Essere umani
- 2026 – Voce e batteria
