= Paola Palma =

Italian composer

- Born: 17 March 1969; Caserta, Italy
- Occupation: lyricist

Paola Palma (born 17 March 1969) is an Italian lyricist, entrepreneur and conductor.

== Life and career ==
At the beginning of her career Palma worked with Carosello Records which was located in the same building as Top Records, the record company created by her father, Guido Palma, in 1976.

In 1996 she founded Smoking Productions together with Massimo Luca: they produced Gianluca Grignani, Fabrizio Moro, Annalisa Minetti.

In 1998 the song "Senza te o con te", sung by Annalisa Minetti and written by Palma and Massimo Luca, won Sanremo Music Festival both in the newcomers section and in the general charts. Senza te o con te was then translated in Spanish ("Junto a ti o sin ti") for the South American market.

Palma wrote most songs of Treno blu, Minetti's first album; Treno blu was published by Sony Music and it sold 50.000 copies in Italy during the first week, winning the Gold Record.

In 2006 Palma won the Felix Prize assigned during ADISQ Gala in Canada for the song "Canzoni per sempre" (later sung by Raja in 2017).

In 2007 she wrote "Amami per sempre" together with Amalia Gré and Michele Ranauro; the song, sung by Amalia Gré, took part in Sanremo Music Festival.

Starting with 2008 Palma has been working as technical consultant for architect Salvador Perez Arroyo and she participated to the project of Verbania's new theatre, Il Maggiore.

From 2014 she is national councilor of AFI, the Italian phonographic association.

== See also ==
- Annalisa Minetti
- Carosello Records
