= Riccardo Sinigallia =

Italian singer-songwriter

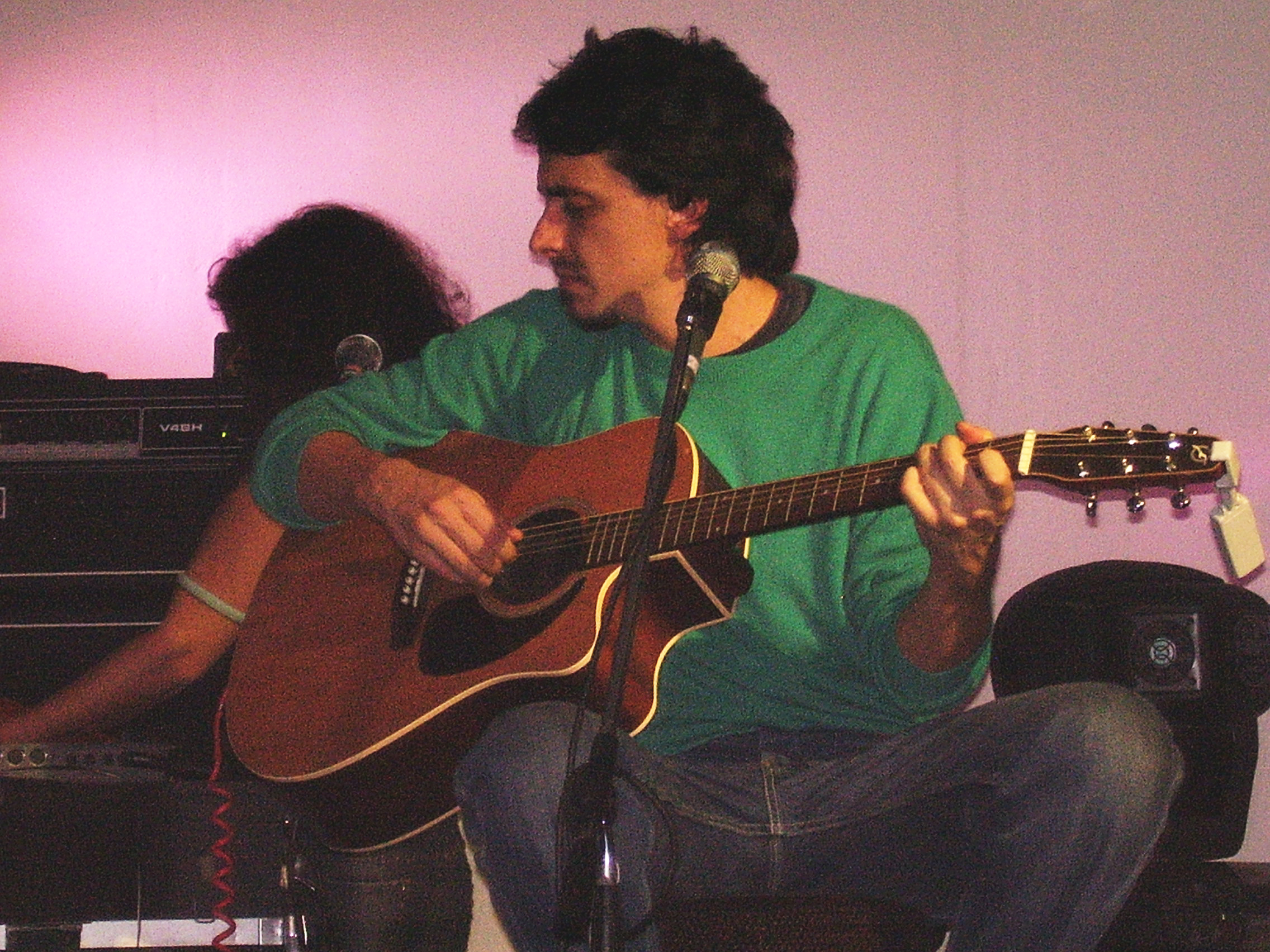
- Sinigallia in 2006

Background information
- Born: 4 March 1970 (age 56); Rome, Italy
- Occupations: Singer; songwriter; record producer
- Years active: 1988–present

Riccardo Sinigallia (born 4 March 1970) is an Italian singer, songwriter, and record producer.

== Life and career ==
Sinigallia, born in Rome in 1970, began writing songs at the age of twelve and gained notoriety within the underground music scene during the 1980s, participating in groups such as the 10 PM Band and 6 Suoi Ex. He is the brother of Daniele Sinigallia, who is also a songwriter and music producer.

In the 1990s, he collaborated as a songwriter and arranger with artists such as Niccolò Fabi and Max Gazzè, contributing to hits like "Vento d'estate" and "Quelli che benpensano". His career took off in 2000 with the band Tiromancino, for which he co-wrote the successful album La descrizione di un attimo. That same year, alongside Tiromancino, he participated in the Sanremo Music Festival in the Newcomers section with the song "Strade", finishing in second place. In 2005, he returned to the Sanremo Music Festival as a guest of Marina Rei in the duets night with the song "Fammi entrare", for which he was also the author.

Sinigallia released his debut solo album in 2003 and continued to produce music, participating in significant Italian events such as the Concerto del Primo Maggio. He subsequently released the albums Incontri a metà strada (2006) and Per tutti (2014). He participated in the Sanremo Music Festival 2014 with the songs "Prima di andare via" and "Una rigenerazione". However, on 21 February 2014, he was disqualified from the festival because the song "Prima di andare via" had already been performed at a charity event, violating the rule that requires all competing songs to be entirely new.

In 2018, he released his fourth album, Ciao cuore. That same year, filmmaker Fabio Lovino presented the biographical film Backliner about Sinigallia at the Rome Film Festival.

In 2025, he returned to the Sanremo Music Festival as a guest of Brunori Sas during the cover night, performing "L'anno che verrà" by Lucio Dalla.

== Discography ==
=== Studio albums ===
Title	Album details	Peak chart positions
Title	Album details	ITA
Riccardo Sinigallia	Release date: 24 October 2003; Label: Sony BMG	―
Incontri a metà strada	Release date: 22 June 2006; Label: Sony BMG	91
Per tutti	Release date: 20 February 2014; Label: Sugar Music	28
Ciao cuore	Release date: 14 September 2018; Label: Sugar Music	48
