= Acrobati =

Studio album by Daniele Silvestri
- Released: 26 February 2016
- Genre: Pop
- Length: 72:45
- Label: Sony Music

Daniele Silvestri chronology
S.C.O.T.C.H. (2011)	Acrobati (2016)

Acrobati is the eighth studio album by Italian singer-songwriter Daniele Silvestri, released February 26, 2016 by Sony Music.

The album debuted at the top of the FIMI Albums Chart, the first in the singer's career to reach this position. Furthermore, on 4 July 2016, a gold record is certified for the 25,000 copies sold.

The record was made in Lecce at Roy Paci's Posada Negro studio and was described by Silvestri as a record intended to "tell stories that would take the listener as far as possible", thus as a work "more poetic than political". Several artists took part in the recordings, including Caparezza (in La guerra del sale), Diodato and Roberto Dell'Era.

The album cover was designed by Paolino De Francesco.

The album was positively received by critics. Ernesto Assante, Journalist of La Repubblica called it "the best work the Roman singer-songwriter has ever done. And if he is not the best he is certainly the richest, most convincing, complete of his albums, the one that paints him in the most precise and sure way, putting together all his passions, his loves, vices and virtues, ideal tensions and those of the heart."

Acrobats was anticipated by the first single "Quali Alibi", released in January 2016.

== Track listing ==
1. La mia casa – 3:55
2. Quali alibi – 4:03
3. Acrobati – 5:23
4. Pochi giorni (feat. Diodato) – 3:51
5. Un altro bicchiere (feat. Dellera) – 3:50
6. La mia routine – 4:53
7. Così vicina – 2:49
8. La verità – 4:13
9. Pensieri – 2:13
10. Monolocale – 5:24
11. La guerra del sale (feat. Caparezza) – 4:03
12. A dispetto dei pronostici – 4:45
13. Come se – 3:56
14. L'orologio (feat. Diego Mancino) – 3:18
15. Bio-Boogie (feat. Funky Pushertz) – 5:15
16. Tuttosport – 1:16
17. Spengo la luce (feat. Dellera) – 4:29
18. Alla fine (feat. Diodato) – 5:09
