= Sotto casa =

Single by Max Gazzè

from the album Sotto casa
- Released: 2013
- Genre: Pop
- Label: Virgin Music
- Songwriters: Francesco Gazzè, Max Gazzè

Max Gazzè singles chronology
"Il drago che ti adora" (2011)	"Sotto casa" (2013)	"I tuoi maledettissimi impegni" (2013)

Music video
- "Sotto casa" on YouTube

"Sotto casa" ('Outside your house') is a song by Max Gazzè, the leading single from his 2013 album with the same name.

== Overview ==
Max Gazzè and his brother composed the song after an encounter with two Jehovah's Witnesses who visited them while they were writing music; after listening to them, the brothers imagined what might happen to such visitors if they were consistently rejected and forced to address a closed door. Lyrics serve as a metaphor about dialogue barriers between different faiths as well as between secular and religious viewpoints, and are intended as an invitation to dialogue and mutual listening among different sides..

The song entered the 63rd edition of the Sanremo Music Festival, where it ranked seventh.

The music video of the song was inspired by Emir Kusturica's films, and features Gazzè alongside his son Samuel wandering Rome's suburban streets in a 1960s Fiat 600 Multipla, knocking at a door until an old man lets them in, and then delivering a hypnotic sermon that wins over the man's family.

== Charts ==
Chart	Peak position
Italy (FIMI)	5
Italy Airplay (Nielsen Music Control)	2

== Certifications ==
Region	Certification	Certified units/sales
Italy (FIMI) Sales from 2009	2× Platinum	200,000^{‡}
^{‡} Sales+streaming figures based on certification alone.
