= Il timido ubriaco =

Single by Max Gazzè

from the album Max Gazzè
- B-side: "Preferisco così"
- Released: 2000
- Genre: Pop
- Label: Virgin Records
- Songwriters: Francesco Gazzè, Max Gazzè
- Producers: Max Gazzè, Giorgio Baldi

Max Gazzè singles chronology
"Colloquium vitae" (1999)	"Il timido ubriaco" (2000)	"L'uomo più furbo" (2000)

Audio
- "Il timido ubriaco" on YouTube

"Il timido ubriaco" ('The shy drunkard') is a 2000 song by Max Gazzè.

== Overview ==
Composed by Gazzè with his brother Francesco, the song entered the 50th edition of the Sanremo Music Festival.

The song is built on a complex structure alternating binary verses, hendecasyllable, and ternary verses, based on "the repetition and variation of hyper-recurrent rhymes and lemmas" with "a plastic geometry that emphasises the idea of circularity and redundancy". The lyrics are inspired by the tradition of courtly love.

The song has been described as "a little masterpiece", and "really absurd, geometric, angular, immediate and inaccessible at the same time".

== Track listing ==
No.	Title	Writer(s)	Length
1.	"Il timido ubriaco"	Francesco Gazzè, Max Gazzè	3:40
2.	"Preferisco così"	Francesco Gazzè, Max Gazzè	4:32

== Charts ==
Chart	Peak position
Italy (FIMI)	13
Italy Airplay (Nielsen Music Control)	2
