= Sentimento (Piccola Orchestra Avion Travel song) =

Single by Piccola Orchestra Avion Travel

from the album Selezione 1990-2000
- B-side: "Costruzioni"
- Released: February 2000
- Label: Sugar
- Songwriters: Domenico Ciaramella, Giuseppe D'Argenzio, Fausto Mesolella, Ferruccio Spinetti, Mario Tronco, Peppe Servillo
- Producer: Caterina Caselli

Piccola Orchestra Avion Travel singles chronology
"Dormi e sogna" (1999)	"Sentimento" (2000)	"Sijmadicandhapajiee" (2006)

Audio
- "Sentimento" on YouTube

"Sentimento" (transl. "Feeling") is a 2000 song composed and performed by Piccola Orchestra Avion Travel. It won the 50th edition of the Sanremo Music Festival. Their Sanremo victory raised some controversy, as it was heavily determined by the quality jury, whose votes made the song rise from the 11th place (based on popular juries' votes) to the first place.

The song has been described as "an introspective reflection represented by the sensation of timelessness one feels when at sea." A patchwork of various influences, music styles and genres, the song opens with a citation of "Santa Lucia", and among other things includes references to Pink Floyd, Giuseppe Verdi, Giacomo Puccini, Pyotr Ilyich Tchaikovsky, progressive rock, Italian folk music. Critics paired it to Kurt Weill-Bertolt Brecht compositions, and to Nino Rota's film scores for Federico Fellini. Television presenter Mike Bongiorno, at the time president of the festival's quality jury whose votes played a crucial role in securing the song's win, referred to it as a song which "brings together sophisticated and popular tastes".

== Track listing ==
No.	Title	Length
1.	"Sentimento"	3:58
2.	"Sentimento (Instrumental)"	4:27
3.	"Costruzioni"	2:03
4.	"Tipota (Instrumental)"	2:14

== Charts ==
Chart	Peak position
Italy (FIMI)	9
