= Max Gazzè =

Italian singer-songwriter and musician (born 1967)

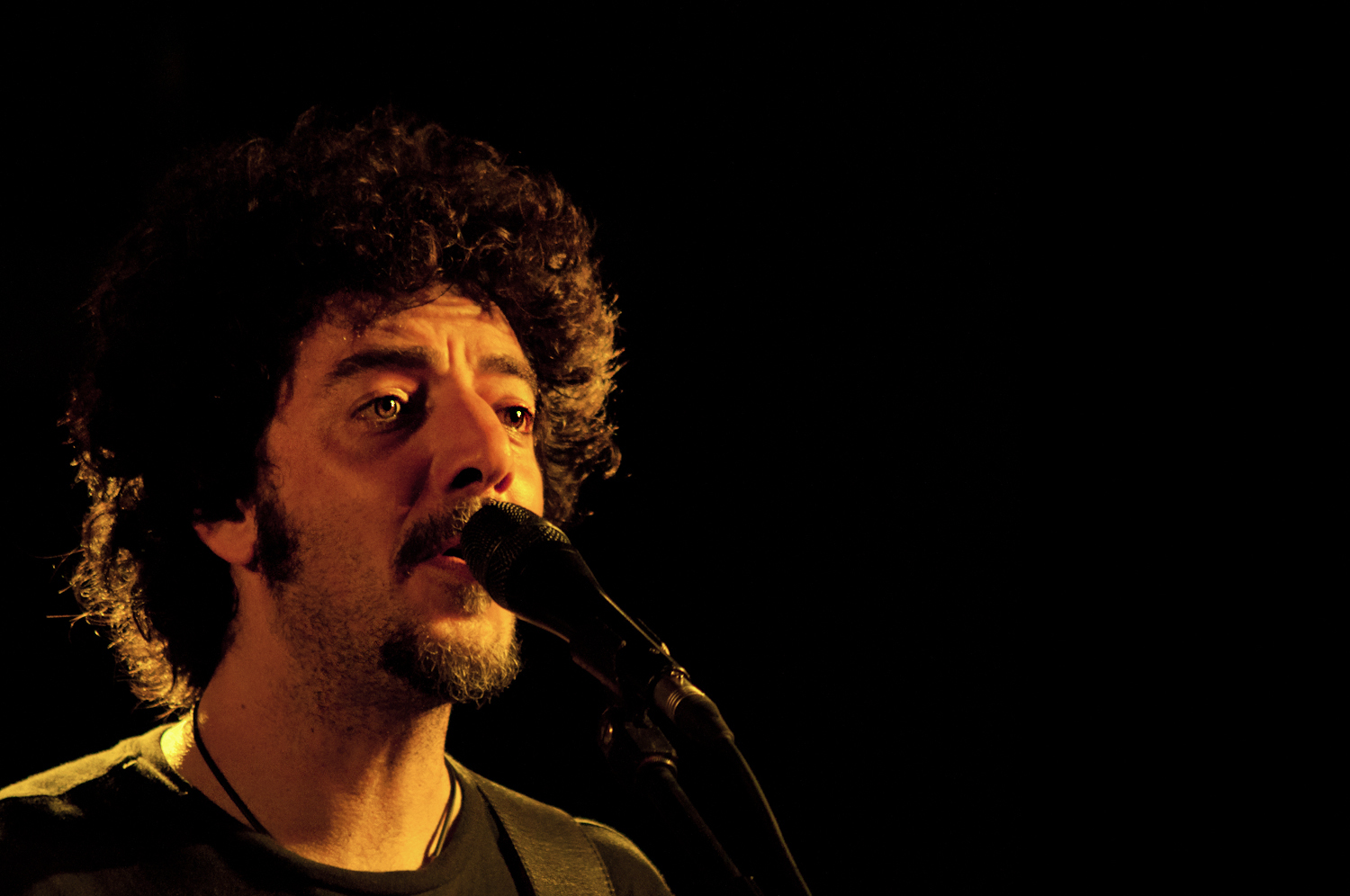
- Max Gazzè in concert in Camposano

Background information
- Born: Massimiliano Gazzè; 6 July 1967 (age 59); Rome, Italy
- Origin: Italy
- Genres: Pop; folk; electronica
- Occupations: Musician; singer; songwriter; actor
- Instruments: Vocals; guitar; bass guitar; harmonica; synthesizer
- Years active: 1991–present
- Labels: EMI, Virgin
- Website: www.maxgazze.it

Massimiliano "Max" Gazzè (born in Rome, 6 July 1967) is an Italian musician (singer-songwriter and bassist) and actor.

== Biography ==
Of Sicilian origins (his father is from Scicli, in the Province of Ragusa, and his mother is from Catania), Max Gazzè was born in Rome. At the age of 6 he began studying piano and at 13 started playing the electric bass. After his parents' separation, at 13, in 1980, he moved from Rome to Brussels with his father, who worked as a diplomat at the Italian embassy. In Brussels he attended the European School and began performing in clubs in Brussels with various groups.

=== Early years ===
In 1985–1990 he played with a number of Jazz fusion, funk, and rock bands around Europe. For five years he was bassist, arranger and co-author for the 4 Play 4, an English Northern soul band with pioneering forays into acid jazz. With the group he moved to southern France, where he also worked as a record producer (Pyramid, Tiziana Kutich). Various tours also took him to the Netherlands. Returning to Rome in 1992, Max Gazzè devoted himself to experimentation in his small recording studio, while composing film scores and beginning collaborations with artists such as Frankie hi-nrg mc, Alex Britti, Niccolò Fabi and Daniele Silvestri. With the latter in particular he engaged in long-standing collaborations. Between 1990 and 1992 he played in the trio Leone-Sorrenti-Gazzè together with Gianni Leone and Duilio Sorrenti, performing in Rome and nearby cities covers of foreign artists and of Il Balletto di Bronzo.

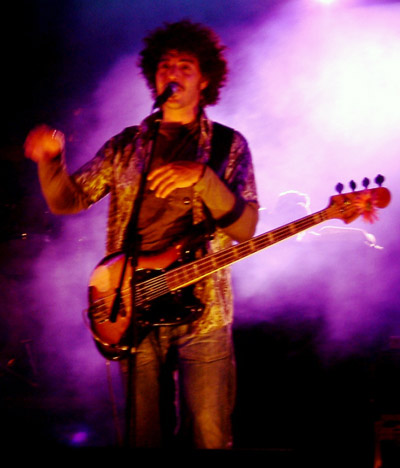
Max Gazzè during a concert in August 2004

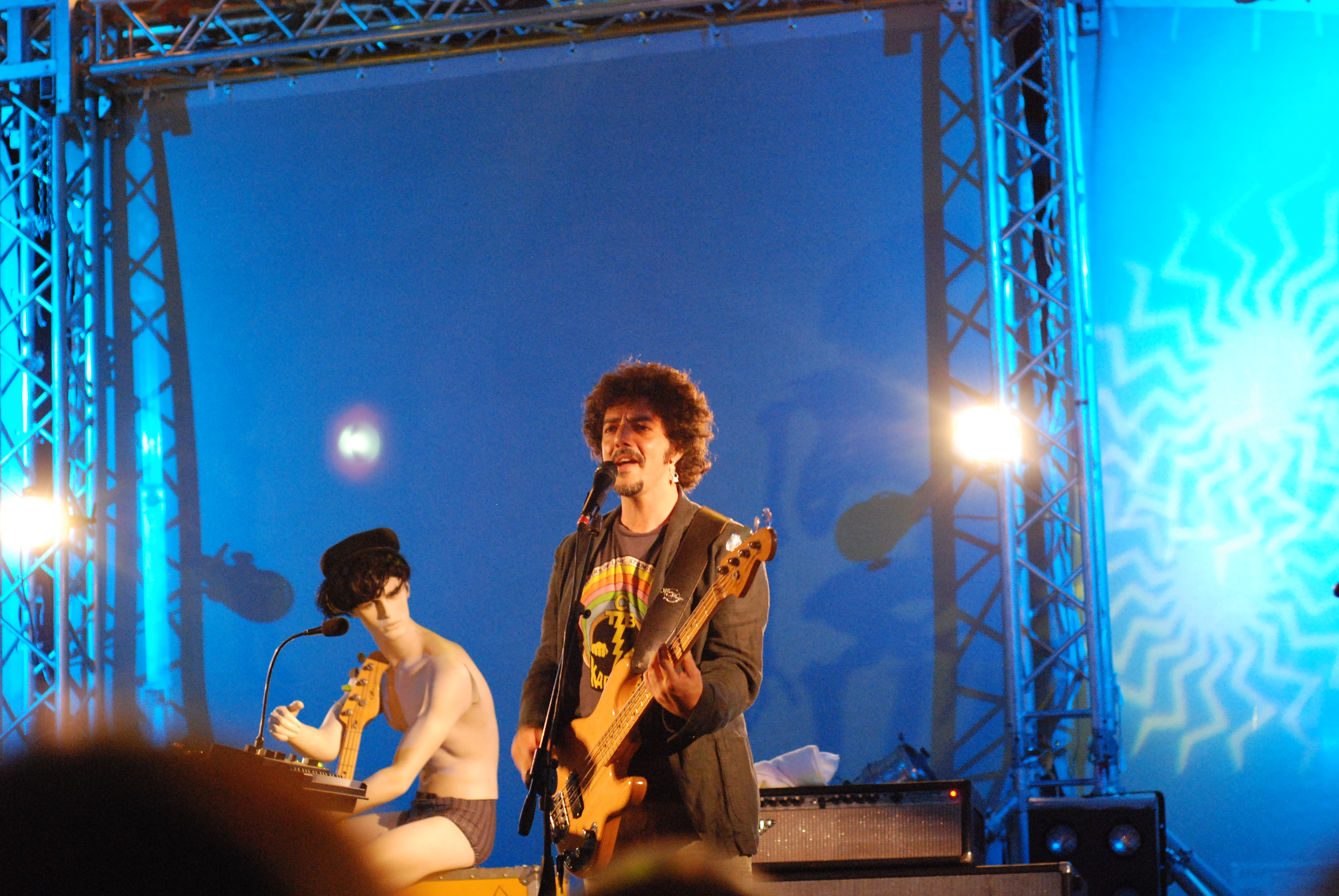
Max Gazzè in concert in 2010

On 9 April 2010 the first film in which Gazzè acted, Basilicata coast to coast by Rocco Papaleo, was released; for it Gazzè composed, together with Gimmi Santucci, the song Mentre dormi, included in the film's soundtrack. For this song he won the Mario Camerini Award for best song in a film. On 4 May 2010 his new studio album, Quindi?, was released, preceded by the single Mentre dormi.

On 25 September 2010 he participated in the Woodstock 5 Stelle music festival, organized in Cesena by the blog of Beppe Grillo and broadcast by the national television channel Play.me, which launched the newly established broadcaster with this live event. In October and November 2010 he portrayed Herod in the musical Jesus Christ Superstar, staged at the Teatro Sistina in Rome.

On 21 July 2011, in Marina di Carrara, he received the "Premio Lunezia Canzone al Cinema" for the musical-literary value of Mentre dormi. On 17 February 2012 he appeared as a guest with Dolcenera at the fourth evening of the Sanremo Music Festival 2012, duetting with her on Ci vediamo a casa. That same year he launched the Over Tour project, performing with Rita Marcotulli on piano and Roberto Gatto on drums.

In 2013 he participated in the 63rd Sanremo Music Festival, hosted by Fabio Fazio, with the songs I tuoi maledettissimi impegni and Sotto casa. The latter, chosen under the new competition mechanism introduced that year, gave its title to the studio album Sotto casa, released on 14 February, followed by a European tour. During this period Gazzè achieved strong commercial success, earning a gold record for the 30,000 copies sold of the album and a platinum record for over 50,000 copies of the single.

On 18 September 2015, La vita com'e entered radio rotation, a highly successful single anticipating the new studio album Maximilian, released at the end of October. In January 2016 the single Mille volte ancora was released, while in summer he released the hits Teresa and Ti sembra normale, the latter certified platinum. The great success continued live: in 2016 he began an Italian tour that then became European and finally worldwide, concluding in Shanghai.

In 2017 he collaborated with Caparezza on the single Migliora la tua memoria con un click, a song from the album Prisoner 709, and with Levante on the single Pezzo di me, from the album Nel caos di stanze stupefacenti, and was among the protagonists of the film by Simona Izzo Lasciami per sempre. That same year the Alchemaya Tour project began, in which Gazzè, accompanied by the voice of Ricky Tognazzi and by the Bohemian Symphony Orchestra of Prague conducted by maestro Clemente Ferrari, presented his pieces arranged in a "sintonica" key, i.e., played with a symphony orchestra and with synthesizers.

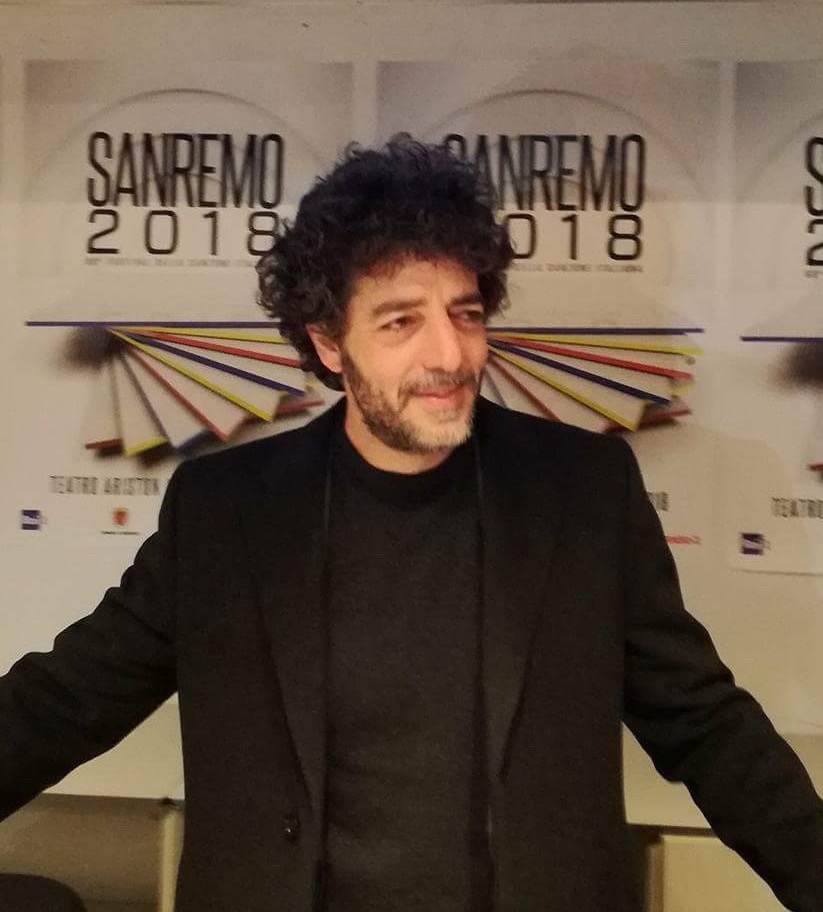
Max Gazzè at Sanremo 2018.

The project continued in 2018 with his participation in the Sanremo Music Festival with the song La leggenda di Cristalda e Pizzomunno. With the song he placed 6th, winning the Premio Giancarlo Bigazzi for best musical composition. On 9 February 2018 the double album Alchemaya was released, composed of new tracks and songs already present on the artist's previous albums, all performed and arranged in the same "sintonica" key, as anticipated by the previous year's tour. He then resumed the Alchemaya Tour, which started on 5 August at the Baths of Caracalla and concluded on 2 September at the Verona Arena.

On 16 November 2018 he collaborated with Carl Brave on the single Posso. In addition, to celebrate 20 years since the release of the album La favola di Adamo ed Eva, he announced for 2019 a European club tour in which he performed only songs from that album. The tour was preceded by a three-night run at Rome's Auditorium Parco della Musica, which also included a second part featuring hit songs from other albums.

In summer 2019 he began the On the Road tour, while in 2020 he collaborated with Francesca Michielin on the song La vie ensemble. In summer 2020 Gazzè became the first artist to restart live music after the stop caused by the lockdown for COVID-19: he interrupted recording for the album he was preparing in order to accept the proposal of his manager Francesco Barbaro and his agency OTR Live to restart live concerts, albeit with limited seating. To help the music sector emerge from the crisis caused by the absence of live events, Gazzè returned to the stage with a full line-up with no reductions, complete with musicians, technical crew and production team, and waived his fee.

In 2021 he participated in the Sanremo Music Festival 2021 with the song Il farmacista, presenting himself on the first evening as Max Gazzè and La Trifluoperazina Monstery Band, made up of cardboard cut-outs representing Elizabeth II on drums, Marilyn Monroe on backing vocals, Jimi Hendrix on guitar, Paul McCartney on bass and Igor from Young Frankenstein on keyboards. On the covers evening he performed with the Magical Mystery Band (which also included Daniele Silvestri) to Del mondo by CSI. During this edition of the festival he drew public attention with his original disguises: on the first evening he appeared dressed as Leonardo da Vinci (as in the official video for Il farmacista); on the third evening he performed seated in an armchair as Salvador Dali; on the final evening he appeared as Clark Kent who, toward the end of the song, revealed Superman's S under his shirt and threw himself onto the seats of the Ariston (empty due to Covid-19 restrictions).

On 9 April of the same year he released the new album La matematica dei rami, produced and performed in collaboration with the Magical Mystery Band. The title echoes Leonardo da Vinci's thesis that the branches of trees follow balanced growth so that, in this arrangement, they can withstand the wind. Gazzè projects this theory onto the work carried out together with the Magical Mystery Band, from which the album was born: created by musicians who brought with them intentions, perspectives and sounds as different as a tree's many branches, together they found an alchemy that made them stronger and more resilient. On 16 April 2021 the new single Considerando was released and in summer he began the La matematica dei rami tour. On 9 July 2021 the new single Il vero amore was released, which, unlike the original version on La matematica dei rami, featured Greta Zuccoli.

In April 2022 he resumed touring and returned to collaborating with Carl Brave on the single Cristo di Rio, while in October he performed at the Amphitheatre of the Archaeological Park of Pompeii in a concert-event dedicated to Pink Floyd.

In May 2023 the single Riviera was released in collaboration with Frenetik & Orang3, while in summer he began the Musicae Loci project, which saw Gazzè in concert accompanied by the long-time musician Max Dedo and by local orchestras at the various tour stops.

On 6 October 2023 the new single Che c'e di male was released, the first extract from the album in progress Amor Fabulas. This was followed by the Italian theatre tour Amor Fabulas - Preludio. On 24 November 2023 the second extract from the album Amor Fabulas was released, titled L'epica della guerra, while in December 2023 Gazzè appeared in the cast of the film Diabolik - Chi sei? directed by the Manetti Bros..

On the occasion of the Zecchino d'Oro 2023 he co-wrote, together with his brother Francesco Gazzè and Francesco De Benedettis, the competition's winning song: Non ci cascheremo mai, performed by Salvatore Flamini.

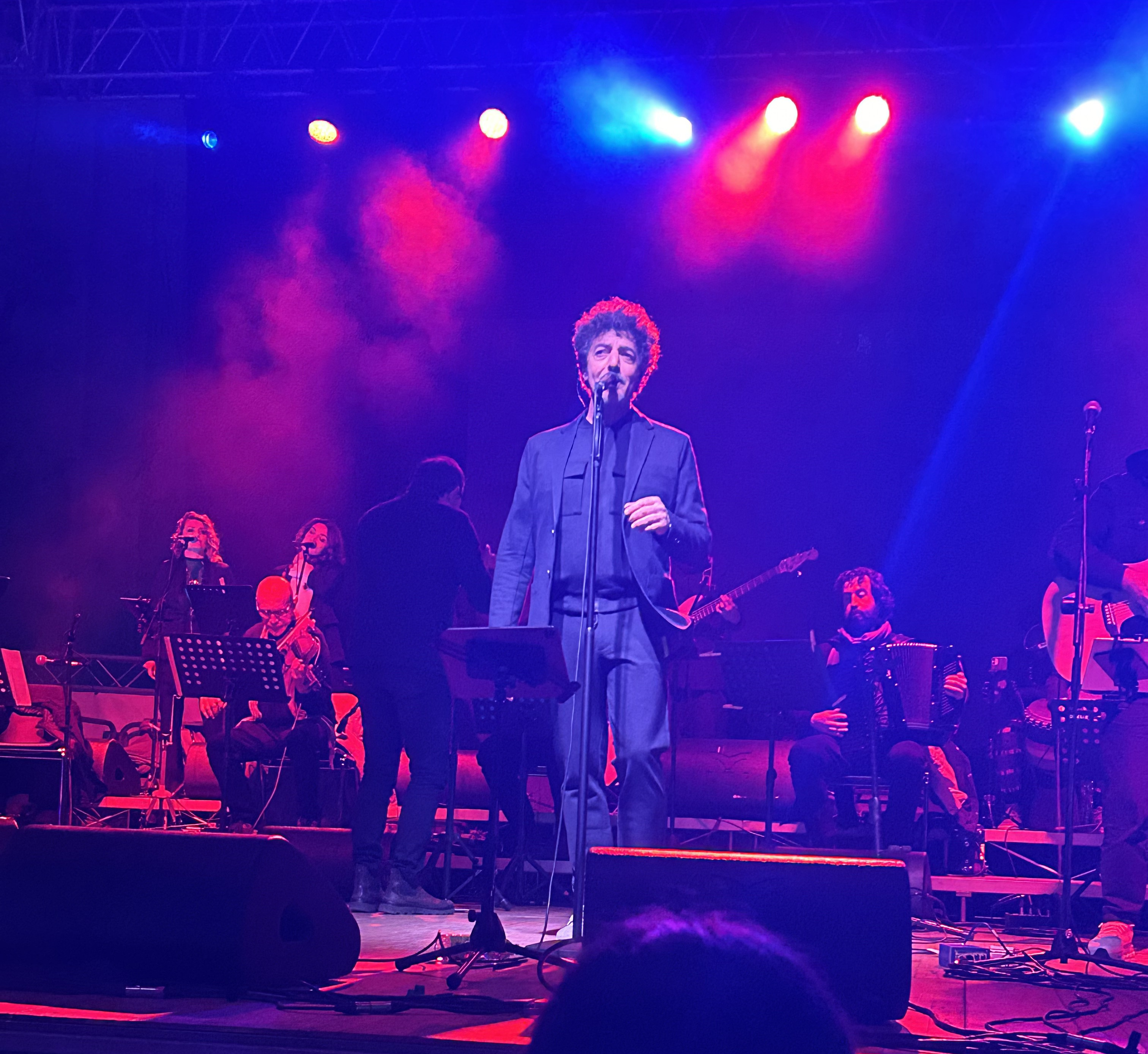
Max Gazzè in concert in 2024

In March 2024 Gazzè returned to theatres with an international tour (initially scheduled for autumn 2023) that started in Brussels and concluded in Rome, and then resumed the Musicae Loci tour. On 24 May 2024 Sara papa was released, the third single extracted from the album in progress Amor Fabulas. On 6 July 2024, the day of his 57th birthday, he reunited with the trio Fabi Silvestri Gazzè for a one-off date at Rome's Circus Maximus, a concert event intended to celebrate the 10th anniversary of the album Il padrone della festa. Summer 2024 saw him engaged in numerous live concerts, interweaving the dates of the Musicae Loci tour with those of the new tour Amor Fabulas - Interludio.

In 2025, in addition to continuing the Musicae Loci tour, he is a protagonist, together with Niccolò Fabi and Daniele Silvestri, of the docufilm Fabi Silvestri Gazzè - Un passo alla volta, which recounts the 30-year friendship of the three singer-songwriters, retracing their artistic and human journey.

== Personal life ==
He has five children: Samuele (b. 1998), Bianca (b. 2001) and Emily (b. 2006) from his former wife, from whom he divorced in 2010 after 15 years of marriage, and Silvia (b. 2013) and Guglielmo (b. 2016) from a following relationship. His son Samuele is a rapper, under the stage name Sam Blu; he also appears in the music video for Sotto casa in the role of the preacher’s assistant. His daughter Bianca appears in the music video for Il solito sesso, while Emily appears in the video for Mille volte ancora.

The lyrics of his songs are written in collaboration with his brother Francesco Gazzè.

== Discography ==
=== Solo studio albums ===
- Contro un'onda del mare (1996)
- La favola di Adamo ed Eva (1998)
- Max Gazzè (2000)
- Ognuno fa quello che gli pare? (2001)
- Un giorno (2004)
- Tra l'aratro e la radio (2008)
- Quindi? (2010)
- Sotto casa (2013)
- Maximilian (2015)
- Alchemaya (2018)
- La Matematica Dei Rami (2021)

=== Collaborative studio albums ===
- Il Padrone Della Festa (2014) with Niccolò Fabi and Daniele Silvestri

== Duets ==
- With Ginevra Di Marco: La tua realtà
- With Carmen Consoli: Il motore degli eventi
- With Daniele Silvestri: Pallida
- With Mao: Colloquium vitae
- With Niccolò Fabi: Vento d'estate
- With Paola Turci: Il debole fra i due
- With Alex Britti: ...Solo con te
- With Stephan Eicher: Cenerentola a mezzanotte
- With Paola Turci e Marina Rei: Il solito sesso (during the duets evening of the 58º Festival di Sanremo, 2008)
- With i Bluvertigo e Morgan: Segnali di vita
- With i Jetlag and Raf: È necessario
- With Luca Barbarossa and Roy Paci: Non mi stanco mai
- With Serena Abrami: Scende la pioggia
- With Carl Brave: Posso, Cristo di Rio

== Collaborations ==
- 1996 – Rappresaglia, Intro, Seguimi, Hold me, Cohiba, Un giorno lontano, Me fece mele a chepa, Via col vento, Samantha, Il dado, Strade di Francia, Lasciami andare, Pino – fratello di Paolo in Il dado by Daniele Silvestri
- 1998 – Vento d'estate in Niccolò Fabi by Niccolò Fabi
- 1998 – O Caroline in The different you – Robert Wyatt e noi
- 1999 – Aria, Pozzo dei desideri, Tu non-torni mai, Giro in si, Desaparecido, Sto benissimo in Signor Dapatas by Daniele Silvestri
- 1999 – Neretva, Tempo di attesa and Le grandi scoperte in Trama tenue by Ginevra Di Marco
- 2000 – Di giada e di veleno in Marjorie Biondo by Marjorie Biondo
- 2000 – Testardo in Occhi da orientale by Daniele Silvestri
- 2001 – Saluto l'inverno in Mi basta il paradiso by Paola Turci
- 2001 – Troppo sensibile in Iperbole by Raf
- 2002 – Silvia, La festa and Cellule in Non è successo niente by Alberto Belgesto
- 2002 – Sette sono i re and Pinto Stefano in Bondo! Bondo! by Bandabardò
- 2003 – Taxi Europa in Taxi Europa by Stephan Eicher
- 2007 – Foolin' Around in Private Paradise by Jacques Villeneuve
- 2007 – 92100 in Io sto qui by Tinturia
- 2007 – Faccia di velluto, Il suo nome, Ninetta Nanna, Che bella faccia in Il latitante by Daniele Silvestri

== Filmography ==
Films
Year	Title	Role	Notes
2010	Basilicata Coast to Coast	Franco Cardillo	
2012	Penguins	Narrator in the Italian version	Directed by Sias Wilson and Anthony Geffen
2013	12 12 12	Geographer	Cameo appearance
2014	Misunderstood	Manuel Ginori	
2014	Confusi e felici	Himself	Cameo appearance
2017	Monster Family	Dracula	Italian dub; voice role
2017	Lasciami per sempre	Nikos	
2023	Diabolik: Who Are You?	Giulio Bruner	
2025	Fabi Silvestri Gazzè – Un passo alla volta	Giulio Bruner	Directed by Francesco Cordio, with Niccolò Fabi and Daniele Silvestri

== Appearances ==
- 1997: Cara Valentina (Sezione Giovani – 27th)
- 1999: Una musica può fare (Nuove Proposte – 8th)
- 2000: Il timido ubriaco (4th)
- 2008: Il solito sesso (12th)
- 2013: Sotto casa (Selected) and I tuoi maledetissimi impegni (7th)
- 2018: La leggenda di Cristalda e Pizzomunno (6th, Premio Giancarlo Bigazzi alla miglior composizione musicale)
- 2021: Il farmacista (17th)

== Awards and recognition ==
- Ciak d'oro
- 2010 - Ciak d'oro for Best Original Score for Basilicata Coast to Coast
- Premio Lunezia Canzone al Cinema 2011 for the soundtrack of Basilicata Coast to Coast
- Zecchino d'Oro 2023 - Composer of the music, together with Francesco De Benedettis, for "Non ci cascheremo mai", the 1st-place song, performed by Salvatore Flamini.

== Bibliography ==
- AA.VV. (2006). Testani, Gianluca (ed.). Enciclopedia del rock italiano. Arcana Editrice. ISBN 88-7966-422-0.
