= Il solito sesso =

Single by Max Gazzè

from the album Tra l'aratro e la radio
- Released: 2008
- Genre: Pop
- Label: OTRlive
- Songwriters: Francesco Gazzè, Max Gazzè

Max Gazzè singles chronology
"Splendere ogni giorno il sole" (2005)	"Il solito sesso" (2008)	"Mentre dormi" (2010)

Audio
- "Il solito sesso" on YouTube

"Il solito sesso" ('The usual sex') is a 2008 song by Max Gazzè, from his album Tra l'aratro e la radio.

== Overview ==
Built as a long telephone conversation between two lovers, the song was composed by Gazzè with his brother Francesco, and entered the 58th edition of the Sanremo Music Festival, where it ranked 12th. It replaced the initial choice for the festival "Siamo come siamo". During the festival, the song was also performed by Gazzè together with Paola Turci and Marina Rei. It has been described as a "highly sophisticated manifesto of subtle allusions".

== Charts ==
Chart	Peak position
Italy (FIMI)	4
Italy Airplay (Nielsen Music Control)	2

== Certifications ==
Region	Certification	Certified units/sales
Italy Sales in 2008	—	35,000
Italy (FIMI) Sales from 2009	2× Platinum	200,000^{‡}
^{‡} Sales+streaming figures based on certification alone.
