= Dente =

Dente is a surname. Notable people with the surname include:

- Fernando Dente (born 1990), Argentine actor, singer, dancer, theater director, and TV presenter
- Marco Dente (1493–1527), Italian Renaissance engraver
- Piero Dente (1901–?), Italian soldier and skier, competitor at the 1924 Winter Olympics (military patrol)
- Sam Dente (1922–2002), American baseball player

== See also ==
- Al dente
