= Ligabue =

Ligabue (pronounced [liɡaˈbuːe]) is a family name of Italian origin, and may refer to:

- Antonio Ligabue (1899–1965), Italian naïve painter
- Giancarlo Ligabue (1931–2015), Italian palaeontologist, politician and businessman
- Ilva Ligabue (1932–1998), Italian operatic soprano
- Luciano Ligabue (born 1960), Italian singer, songwriter, book writer and film director
- Ligabuesaurus, an extinct reptile named in honor of Giancarlo Ligabue

== See also ==
- Ligabue (film), a 1978 film
