= Samuele Bersani =

Italian singer-songwriter (born 1970)

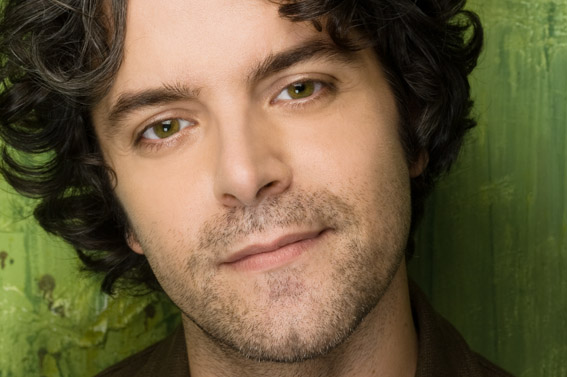
- Bersani in 2009

Background information
- Born: 1 October 1970 (age 55); Rimini, Italy
- Genres: Pop
- Occupation: Singer-songwriter
- Years active: 1991–present
- Label: Fuori Classifica
- Website: samuelebersani.net

Samuele Bersani (born 1 October 1970) is an Italian singer-songwriter. He received the "Mia Martini" Critics Award at the Sanremo Music Festival in 2000 and in 2012, with the songs "Replay" and "Un pallone", respectively. His best known songs also include "Giudizi universali", released in 1997 and certified in 2017 as a platinum-selling single by the Federation of the Italian Music Industry, and "Spaccacuore," which was later covered by Italian singer Laura Pausini. He wrote the lyrics of Lucio Dalla's song "Canzone."

In 2000, Bersani recorded the soundtrack of the film Chiedimi se sono felice, by Aldo, Giovanni & Giacomo. In 2007, he won the Amnesty International Italy "Voci per la liberta" Award for "Occhiali rotti", a song included in his album L'aldiqua (2006) and written in memory of journalist Enzo Baldoni. His record Cinema Samuele received the Targa Tenco for Best Album in 2021.

== Biography ==
=== 1970–1991: childhood and early beginnings ===
Samuele Bersani was born on 1 October 1970 in Rimini, in the Emilia-Romagna region of Italy. His father was a music teacher, while his mother was an employee, and she also became the vice-mayor of Cattolica, the town in which he grew up. He studied at the classical lyceum, but he left school a few months before his "maturity exam". While he was a teenager, Bersani played in several local bands and took part in local singing competitions. In 1991, he met Italian singer-songwriter Lucio Dalla before a concert Dalla was going to give in San Benedetto del Tronto, in Central Italy. Bersani asked Dalla to listen to a recording of his original song "Il mostro", and a few minutes later Dalla's producer, Renzo Cremonini, told him to open the concert performing the song. Bersani was then chosen as the opening act for the remaining concerts of Dalla's Cambio tour.

=== 1992–1996: C'hanno preso tutto and Freak ===
Bersani's debut album, C'hanno preso tutto, was released in November 1992. The album included the song "Il mostro", as well as the single "Chiccho e Spillo", which allowed Bersani to receive media attention, becoming a radio hit and supporting sales of the album, which sold more than 20,000 copies in Italy. In 1995, Bersani released his second album, Freak. The album's lead single, "Freak", was released in February of the same year, but some Italian radio stations decided not to air it as a consequence of a line referring both to the Italian conservative coalition and to the Italian Communist Party, which was considered a violation of the "par condicio law", which introduced fees for those stations giving airplay to songs including political messages during the electoral campaign preceding the Italian regional elections. As a consequence, Bersani's label decided to anticipate the release of the second single from the album, "Spaccacuore". Both "Freak" and "Spaccacuore" were later performed by Bersani during the itinerant television show Festivalbar, during the summer of 1995. The album was a commercial success, and it was certified platinum, selling more than 130,000 copies in Italy.

== Discography ==
- C'hanno preso tutto (1992)
- Freak (1995)
- Samuele Bersani (1997)
- L'oroscopo speciale (2000)
- Che vita! Il meglio di Samuele Bersani (2002)
- Caramella smog (2003)
- L'aldiqua (2006)
- Manifesto abusivo (2009)
- Nuvola numero nove (2013)
- La fortuna che abbiamo – Live (2016)
- Cinema Samuele (2020)
