= Ice One =

Italian rapper and record producer (born 1966)

- Also known as: Ice One
- Born: Sebastiano Ruocco; May 16, 1966 (age 60); Turin, Italy
- Origin: Turin, Italy
- Genres: Underground hip hop, hardcore hip hop
- Occupations: Rapper, beatmaker, writer
- Years active: 1984-present

Sebastiano Ruocco (born May 16, 1966), known professionally as Ice One, is an Italian rapper and record producer. He was born and raised in Turin, Italy. Ice One is one of the pioneers of Italian underground hip hop, having started to perform in 1982.

During his career, Ice One worked with two of the most important Italian hip hop groups of the nineties, Colle der Fomento (founded with Danno & Masito, 1994-1999) and Assalti Frontali (1999).

== Discography ==
Albums

- B-Boy Maniaco (1995)
- Crescendo: The Dark Side of Funk (1996)
- Odio pieno (as Colle der Fomento) (1996)
- Scienza doppia H (as Colle der Fomento) (1999)
- Banditi (as Assalti Frontali) (1999)
- Medicina buona (as La Comitiva) (1999)
- Latte & sangue (with Don Diegoh) (2015)

EPs

- Power 2 the People (as Power MC) (1991)
- Word Up (as Fluydo) (2006)
