= Paola Turci =

Italian composer

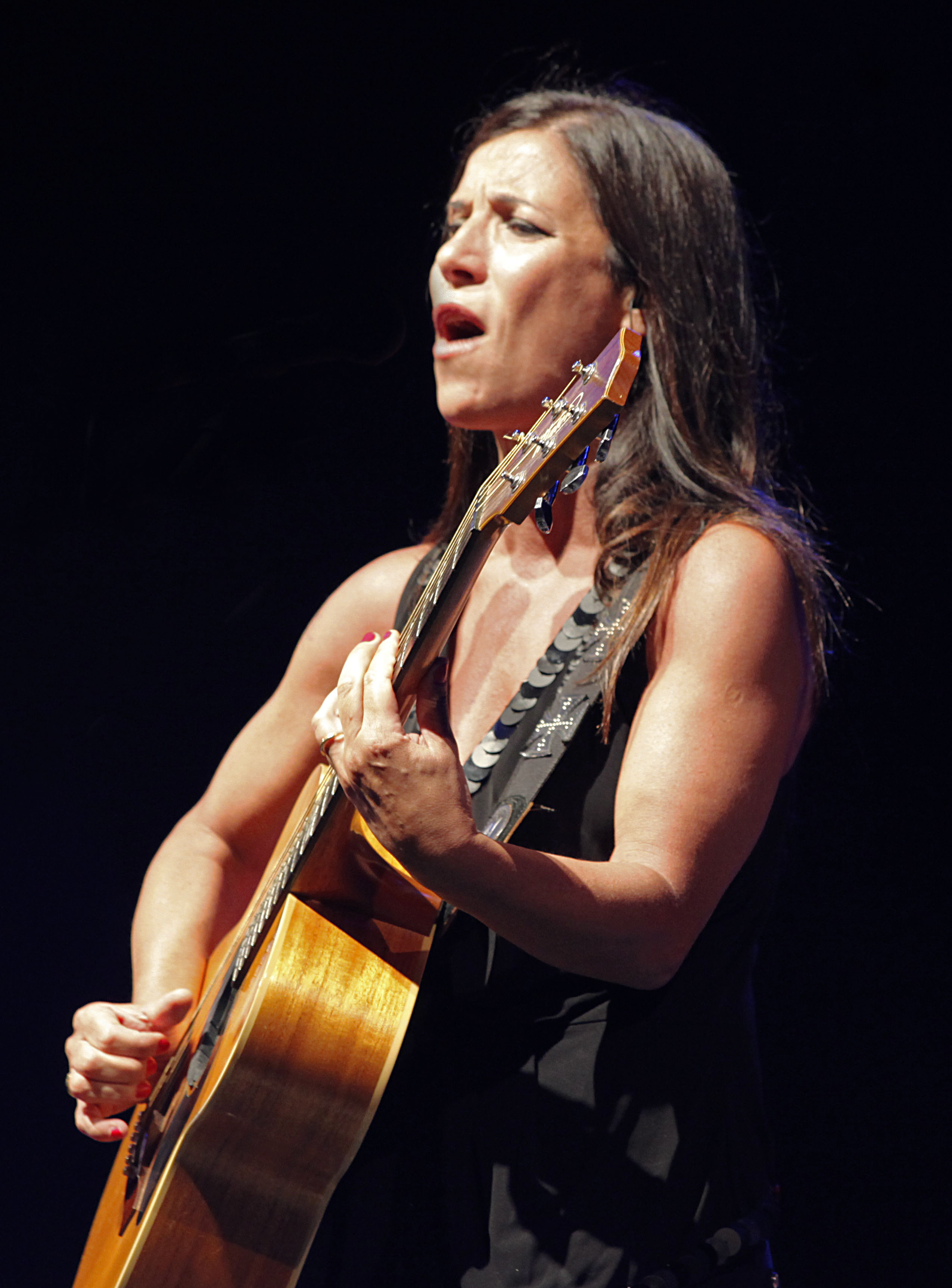
Paola Turci (2010)

Paola Turci (born 12 September 1964 in Rome) is an Italian singer, songwriter, performer and author.

== Career ==
=== 1980s ===
Turci's musical debut was in 1986 when she participated in Sanremo Music Festival with the song "L'uomo di ieri", written by Mario Castelnuovo The song appeared in her first album Ragazza sola ragazza blu. In the three following years she participated again in Sanremo Music Festival, winning the critic's award in 1987 with the song "Primo tango". She participated again in the Festival with the song "Sarò bellissima", and in 1989 she returned with "Bambini". Thanks to this song she comes first in the Emerging artists category of the Sanremo Music Festival. "Bambini" is the song that clearly established Turci's popularity.

=== 1990s ===
In 1990 Turci graced for the fifth time the Sanremo Music Festival stage, with the song "Ringrazio Dio"; meanwhile she issued the album Ritorno al presente which included the song "Frontiera", that she promote during the summer music competition Festivalbar. In 1991 Turci promoted Candido, as for Voltaire's 1759 novel, and, in the same year, Turci won the Cantagiro, a music competition. A few weeks later, her song "E mi arriva il mare" performed with Riccardo Cocciante, hit the Italian playlists. In 1993 the artist participated for the sixth time in the Sanremo Music Festival, with the song "Stato di calma apparente". "Stato di calma apparente" is an autobiographic song, where, for the first time, Paola Turci emerges as author. In 1993 the album Ragazze was published. On 15 August 1993 Paola Turci, whilst touring, was involved in a terrible car accident that has changed forever her life, marking her career and private life. Despite the traumatic consequences of the accident, a few weeks later Turci decides to fulfil her professional commitments, continuing exhibiting in numerous concerts. In autumn 1993 Turci sings "Io e Maria" written by Luca Carboni, a song that approaches, for the first time in Italy, the theme of a sapphic liaison. During the same period, she participates with other artists to a collective experience called Innocenti evasioni, a Lucio Battisti tribute where she re-interpreted the song "Ancora tu". In 1995 Turci returns with a new album Una sgommata e via. which is also the name of her new single written by Vasco Rossi. This album is characterized by ‘90s acoustic background and rock-pop sounds. This album also included a cover of Luigi Tenco's, "E se ci diranno", re-arranged to empathize a rock character. With this album she started cooperation with Roberto Casini (previously a member of Steve Rogers Band), cooperation ending in 2000. 1996 saw the issue of the anthology Volo così 1986-1996, the name coming from the successful song presented in the Sanremo Music Festival 1996. The same year Turci participated in Festivalbar with "La felicità", another unreleased track recorded for the anthology. In 1997 was published Oltre le nuvole, this is the only Turci's album entirely compounded by covers. The album is characterized by American and British sounds winking at 1980s–1990s rock-pop international scenario. Tracks of the likes of: "Missing You" by John Waite, "You Don't Understand Me" by Roxette and "I'll Stand by You" by Pretenders. The aim of the album was to experiment translating into Italian the most captivating sounds of the Anglo-Saxon world. The album first single was "Sai che è un attimo", a Jude Cole cover of "Time for Letting Go". It is a success achieving over 150,000 copies; the album went platinum. In 1998 the album was reissued adding 2 more songs and one of the two, "Solo come me", an unpublished work was presented in Sanremo Music Festival 1998.

=== 2000s ===
Following the success of Oltre le nuvole, in 2000 Turci was asked to try again the same formula for a new album Mi basta il paradiso, where, together with covers, there are a number of previously unreleased songs such as "Sabbia bagnata" and "Saluto l'inverno" both singles written together with her friend, the singer Carmen Consoli. "Saluto l'inverno" was presented at Sanremo Music Festival 2001 where it reached 5th place. The third single of Mi basta il paradiso was "Questione di sguardi", a cover of Faith Hill's "This Kiss". In 2002 Turci decided to turn to an independent music label in order to freely perform as a songwriter. Questa parte di mondo marks the change to a more intimate musical experience, where this work of art shows a new artistic dimension. The new single Mani giunte, sung with Articolo 31 singer, was published in Articolo 31's album Domani smetto with the title "Fuck You". The second single, "Questa parte di mondo", that gives the title to the album, is a song written with A. Rizzo, the author of the song "Bambini". In 2004 Turci published Stato di calma apparente, an anthology recorded entirely live. In this album the singer interpreted the most significant songs of her career with intimate and mature arrangements and her unmistakable captivating vocal colours. The anthology brings bridges substantial human experiences: from love to sorrow, passing through social commitment. This project also included new songs: "Paloma negra" Chavela Vargas's cover, and two new songs: "Il gigante" and "La tua voce". Turci subsequently declared that, through this album, she wanted to put an end to all she did until that moment in order to be free and allocate time to new projects. The 2005 saw the release of her 15th album, Tra i fuochi in mezzo al cielo where the singer collaborated with Carlo Ubaldo Rossi for the production. The first track, "Dimentichiamo tutto", is a confirmation of the artist's creative capabilities. The whole album explores socio-political matters with songs like "Troppo occidentale" and human troubles, with extreme thoughtfulness. In the songs "Quasi settembre" and "Lasciami credere" she approaches the sorrow of the death; in "L'inverno senza neve" she speaks of abandon; while in "Rwanda" she speaks about the tragedy of war and genocide. With this song she won the Amnesty Italy award in 2006. At the same time Paola Turci engaged herself in supporting the NGO Ucodep that implements projects for Vietnamese children. In 2006 she performed with the dancer Giorgio Rossi a piece called Cielo-voce danzante e corpo sonoro a performance where live acoustic songs are interpreted in movements by the dancer. In this theatrical performance, Turci leaves her impetuous biting rock soul sound to perform smooth and embracing sounds, accompanying sometimes the songs by classic guitar or just with her intense voice. The repertoire of this performance goes from her songs to reinterpretation of other famous artists such as Léo Ferré, Caetano Veloso, Domenico Modugno, Patty Pravo, Francesco De Gregori and Chavela Vargas. In the same year Paola Turci was the artistic director of the Venerelettrica International Female Rock Festival in Perugia and she awarded the singer of C.F.F. e il Nomade Venerabile, Anna Maria Stasi, as the best voice of the Festival (she declared to the Corriere dell'Umbria on 4 March 2006: "I saw the performance of the C.F.F. e il Nomade Venerabile. I greatly appreciated their ability to dare, to go beyond the boundaries of creativity").

In 2007 Turci, together with Max Gazzè and Marina Rei performed in a tour named Di comune accordo, where she plays electric guitar, Max Gazzè plays bass and Marina Rei plays drums. The artists are accompanied throughout various cities of the tour by the violinist Andrea Di Cesare. During the same period Turci starts her writing experience that will lead, in 2009, to the publication of the novel Con te accanto.

In December 2007, the singer participated in Premio Tenco where she re-launched one of the most popular Tenco songs, "E se ci diranno" and her song "Quasi settembre" in an acoustic version. In 2008 she is back in the Ariston theatre supporting, with Marina Rei, Max Gazze competing in the Sanremo Music Festival with the song "Il solito sesso". From July 2008 she is again on stage with a double commitment: a rock tour and again with the theatrical performance Cielo. In December of the same year her book Con te accanto is released. The novel outlines the sweet–bitter experience of a friendship between two women; they met by accident in a hospital and, step by step they, they sort out together their physical and psychological pains. From April 2009 Paola Turci directs a Radio Due broadcast La mezzanotte di Radio Due. In this broadcast, Turci is able to interweave interaction with listeners and live music performed alone or with her guests. She plays her songs and interprets songs of other artists. In June 2009 "La mangiatrice di uomini" written by Francesco Bianconi, Baustelle's frontman. Became the first single of the new album Attraversami il cuore. The new album is the first episode of a trilogy where the artist consolidates her authorial capacity in the form of an intimate and refined musical project. Nevertheless, there are some deem influences due to the cooperation with Marcello Murru and the jazz composer Paolo Fresu. Paola Turci also took part in the special charity event organized by Laura Pausini, Amiche per l'Abruzzo organized following the L'Aquila earthquake. Social commitment is again the focus of the 20 December fundraising event, the Watoto Festival at Brancaccio theatre in Rome where the Roman artist, performs together with Fiorella Mannoia and Noemi for Kenyan children. In April 2010 the second volume of the trilogy was released, Giorni di rose. The new album is entirely dedicated to the female universe. The album includes an Ivano Fossati cover, "Lunaspina" performed with Fiorella Mannoia, and seven new songs written for Turci by 7 famous singers namely: Carmen Consoli, Nada, Marina Rei, Chiara Civello, Naïf Hérin, Grazia Verasani and Ginevra Di Marco. "Danza intorno al sole", single of the album, is edited by Nada and Carmen Consoli. In the same year Turci is invited to participate in MTV days.

In July 2011 the first single of the last chapter of the trilogy was published: "Utopia" a Giorgio Gaber song re-interpreted with a rock touch. In November of the same year Turci broadcast on the online version of Il Fatto Quotidiano, an Italian newspaper, the song "Devi andartene" a song written by Marcello Murru that speaks about the Italian socio-political crisis that echoes another 2002 Turci song, "Un bel sorriso in faccia". "Devi andartene" and "Utopia" were included in her new album Le storie degli altri, which is also the name of another single of the album, released in April 2012. In May 2012 Turci participated in Stile libero a radio broadcast of R101 in a hilarious contest, Maffoni & Lontani Conoscents promoting together with several Italian singers the song: "We are the Maffons" – a parody of "We Are the World". In May 2014 she cooperated with Laura Pausini in Stasera Laura: ho creduto in un sogno, a one-man show broadcast on TV, accompanying the singer in the song "Con la musica alla radio". In September 2014 her autobiography Mi amerò lo stesso was published where she speaks in first person about the main personal and professional events of her life, her troubles and her beliefs. Turci declares that the book is a present for her 50-year birthday: "the motive for me writing this book is disclosed in the title… to forgive myself for the mistakes and accidents, actual and metaphorical, that I caused to myself". In November 2014 Fondazione Francesca Rava, an Italian NGO that promotes children care, organized in cooperation with the Italian Cultural Institute an event/benefit concert where Turci was the testimonial, and in that circumstance Turci performed with Karlex, a Haitian singer. Of particular importance was her acoustic version of "Hallelujah" by Leonard Cohen. In April 2015 she issued her 19th album, it is an anthology with three new songs: "Io sono" which gives the title to the album, is again a collaboration with Francesco Bianconi. The album explores new sounds, adding an electronic touch to her best repertoire. In the album there are two other unreleased songs: "Questa non è una canzone" and "Quante vite viviamo" written with Marcello Murru's contribution. These songs revert to Paola's most intimate musical experiments. In a recent interview Turci declares that most probably her next album will have an anarchic touch: "the result of what today I am able to be and I couldn't be in the past"

In February 2017, Turci returned to the Sanremo Music Festival with the song "Fatti bella per te", which finished fifth; the song was included in her album Il secondo cuore, released on 31 March 2017 by Warner Music Italy.

In 2019 she competed at the Sanremo Music Festival with "L'ultimo ostacolo", which placed sixteenth; her album Viva da morire was released on 15 March 2019 by Warner Music Italy.

Her studio album Amore a dismisura, her first album of new material in seven years, was released on 2 October 2026 by BMG, preceded by the single "Vita mia".

On 23 October 2026, Turci received the Premio Tenco career award at the 49th edition of the festival in Sanremo.

== Personal life ==
In the 1990s Turci had a relationship with the tennis player Paolo Canè. In 2010 she married the journalist Andrea Amato; their wedding was celebrated in Haiti, with Francesca Turci and Francesca Rava NPH Foundation volunteers attending the private ceremony. Paola and Andrea broke up in 2012. In 2022 Turci announced her relationship and imminent marriage with Francesca Pascale. On 2 July 2022 she married her in Montalcino.

Turci has a long history of cooperation with NGOs and social commitment. Her sensitivity, in particular concerning children, has led her to engage herself in several volunteering experiences, namely: in Viet Nam with the NGO Ucodep and in Haiti with the Francesca Rava Foundation. She speaks broadly of her experiences in the autobiography Mi amerò lo stesso, edited by Enrico Rotelli, Mondadori, 2014.

== Discography ==
=== Studio albums ===
- 1988 – Ragazza sola ragazza blu
- 1989 – Paola Turci
- 1990 – Ritorno al presente
- 1991 – Candido
- 1993 – Ragazze
- 1995 – Una sgommata e via
- 1996 – Volo così 1986-1996
- 1997 – Oltre le nuvole
- 2000 – Mi basta il paradiso
- 2002 – Questa parte di mondo
- 2004 – Stato di calma apparente
- 2005 – Tra i fuochi in mezzo al cielo
- 2009 – Attraversami il cuore
- 2010 – Giorni di rose
- 2012 – Le storie degli altri
- 2017 – Il secondo cuore
- 2019 – Viva da morire
- 2026 – Amore a dismisura

=== Greatest hits albums ===
- 1996 – Volo così 1986-1996
- 2015 – Io sono

=== Live albums ===
- 2004 – Stato di calma apparente

== Other information ==
Turci has also edited the preface of Ventitré secondi – L'Aquila by A. Aquilio, this book narrates L'Aquila 2009 earthquake.
