= Fabio Fazio =

Italian television presenter (born 1964)

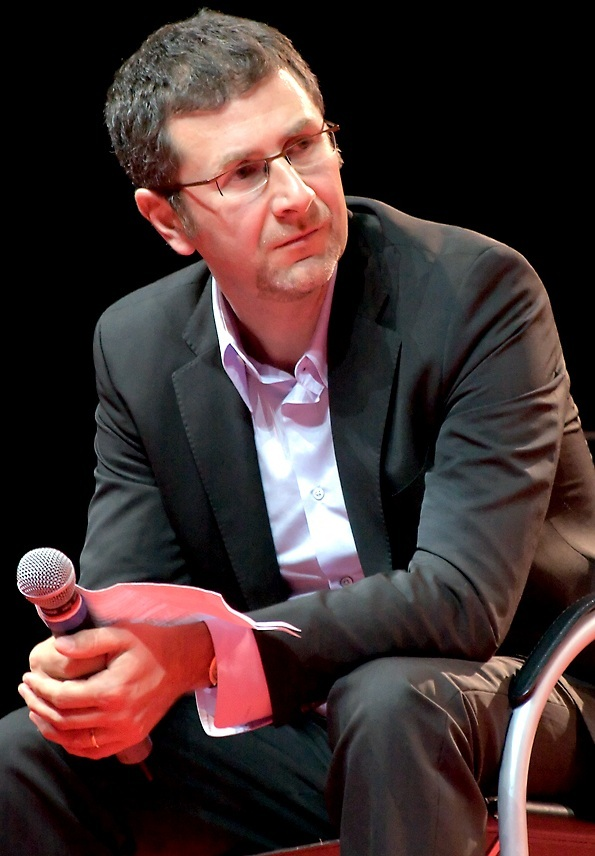
- Fabio Fazio in 2010, during the 9th Italian meeting organized by Emergency
- Born: Fabio Fazio; 30 November 1964 (age 61); Savona, Italy
- Education: University of Genoa
- Occupation: Television presenter
- Years active: 1982–present
- Employer: Warner Bros. Discovery
- Television: Warner Bros. Discovery
- Height: 1.76 m (5 ft 9 in)
- Spouse: Gioia Selis (since 1994)
- Children: Michele (2004); Caterina (2009)

Fabio Fazio (Italian pronunciation: [ˈfaːbjo ˈfattsjo]; born 30 November 1964) is an Italian television presenter. After debuting in 1982, he presented many TV programs, including Quelli che... il Calcio, Vieni via con me and Quello che (non) ho. Since 2003, he presents the weekly talk show Che tempo che fa, which airs on Nove since October 2023 and was formerly broadcast by Rai 3. He presented the Sanremo Music Festival in 1999, 2000, 2013 and 2014.

== Biography ==
=== Early life ===
Fabio Fazio was born in Savona, Italy, on 30 November 1964 to Giuseppe from Varazze and Delia from Calabria. After receiving the high school diploma at the liceo classico Gabriello Chiabrera in Savona, Fazio started studying Law, following his mother's suggestions. He later decided to leave his law studies, enrolling in the University of Genoa, where he graduated with 110/110 in Literature, discussing a thesis about literary elements in songs written by Italian cantautori.

=== First radio and TV appearances ===
In 1980, Fazio debuted as a radio personality, appearing in local stations such as Radio Vecchia Savona and Radio Golfo Ligure. In 1982, he debuted as a celebrity impersonator at RAI's radio program Black Out.

After winning a contest organized by the Italian national broadcaster, Fazio made his first TV appearance in 1983, when he took part in Raffaella Carrà's show Pronto Raffaella?. During the following years, he appeared in many other TV programs, including Rai 1's game show Loretta Goggi in quiz, Rete 4's Sponsor City and Rai 3's L'orecchiocchio.

In 1987, Fazio regularly appeared on Forza Italia, one of the first TV programs broadcast by Odeon TV, mixing talks about soccer matches with entertainment sketches. Between 1989 and 1990, he also worked for RAI programs Fate il vostro gioco and Mai dire mai. In 1990 and in 1991 he presented Banane, a satirical program broadcast by Telemontecarlo. For the same network, he worked as an author for the show T'amoTV.

=== Quelli che... il Calcio and TV success ===
In 1993, Fazio started presenting the show Quelli che... il Calcio, broadcast by Rai 3 and inspired by his previous show Forza Italia. The program, based on live commentary of Serie A soccer matches, strongly contributed making him popular in Italy. He presented the show until 2001, when he was replaced by Simona Ventura, after leaving the Italian public broadcaster. In 1997, he received the Premio Regia Tv for his show Anima mia, presented with Italian singer Claudio Baglioni. During the award ceremony, he also received the prize for Male TV Personality of the Year.

In 1999, he presented the Sanremo Music Festival with virologist Nobel Prize-winner Renato Dulbecco and French actress and model Laetitia Casta. The following year, he was confirmed as the presenter of the singing competition. Other presenters of the show in 2000 were operatic tenor Luciano Pavarotti, Italian actor Teo Teocoli and Spanish model Inés Sastre.

In 2001, he left RAI and signed a contract with the newborn private channel La7. On 24 June 2001, he appeared on the inaugural show of the network, together with Gad Lerner, Eros Ramazzotti and Pino Daniele. However, his first talk show for La7 was canceled a few days before its planned debut.

=== Che tempo che fa and the shows with Roberto Saviano ===
In 2003, Fazio started presenting the talk show Che tempo che fa, in which he interviews entertainers, politicians, artists and scientists. In November 2010, he presented Vieni via con me with Italian writer Roberto Saviano. The show was a big success, becoming the most watched show to be broadcast by Rai 3 in ten years. Despite this, the show was not confirmed for the following year, therefore Fazio and Saviano decided to move the program to La7, renaming it Quello che (non) ho. The show, consisting in three episodes, achieved an average share of 12.67%, with 2.9 million average viewers.

=== Sanremo Music Festival ===
In June 2012, RAI announced Fabio Fazio as the presenter of the 63rd Sanremo Music Festival. Luciana Littizzetto was later confirmed as the co-presenter of the show. They presented 2013 and 2014 editions.

=== Obama interview ===
On February 7, 2021, Fazio interviewed former President of the United States (POTUS) Barack Obama on his talk show Che tempo che fa. It was the first time that Obama appeared on an Italian television programme.
