= Daniele Silvestri =

Italian singer-songwriter and musician (born 1968)

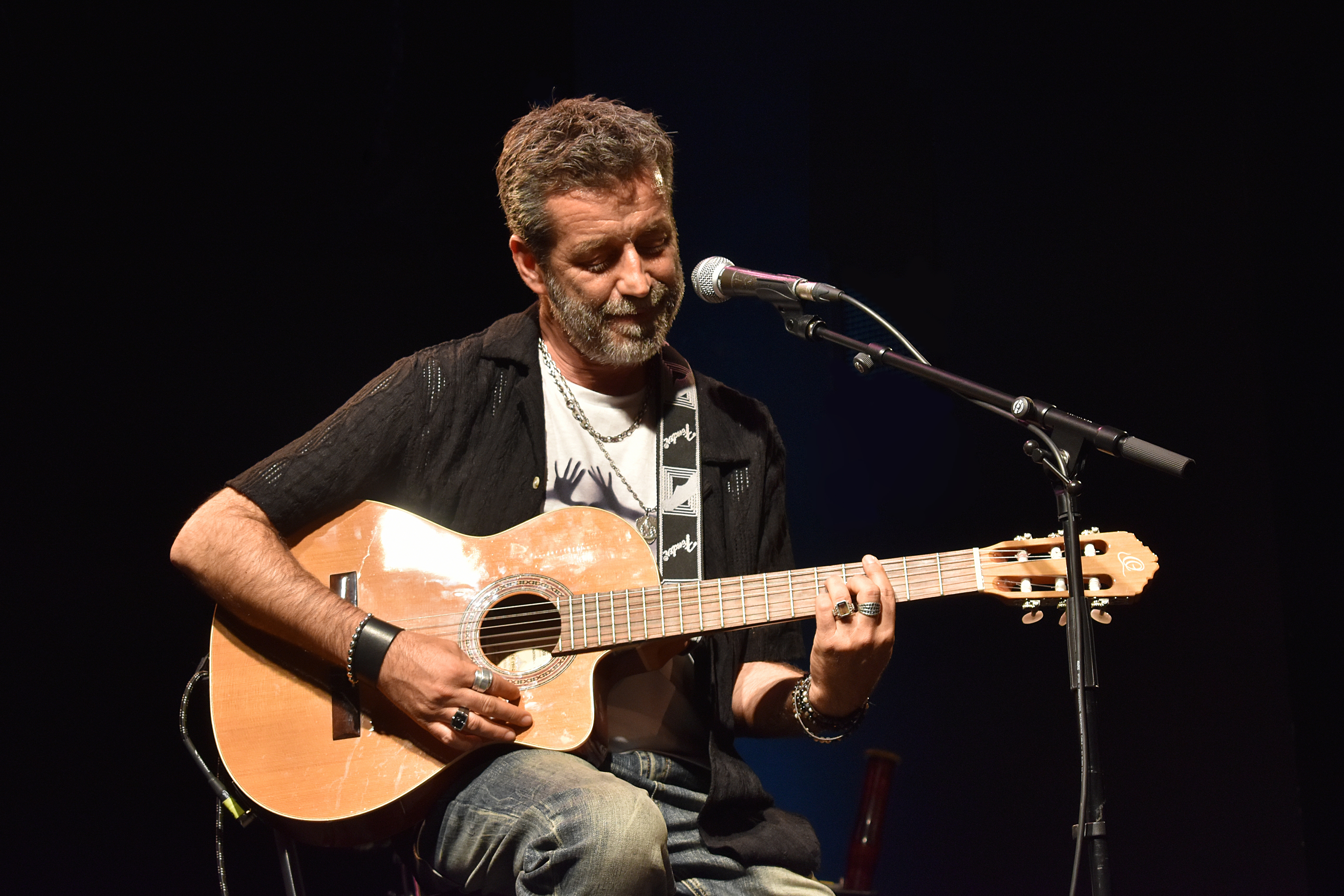
- Daniele Silvestri in concert in Paris in 2024

Background information
- Born: 18 August 1968 (age 58); Rome, Italy
- Genres: Pop
- Occupations: Singer-songwriter, musician
- Instruments: Vocals, piano, guitar
- Years active: 1994–present
- Labels: Ricordi, BMG Ricordi, Sony Music
- Website: danielesilvestri.it

Daniele Silvestri (born 18 August 1968) is an Italian singer-songwriter and musician.

== Career ==
Silvestri debuted in 1994, releasing his eponymous album. The set received a Targa Tenco for Best Debut Album. In 1995, he competed in the Newcomers' Section of the Sanremo Music Festival with the song "L'uomo col megafono". The track was included in his second studio album, Prima di essere uomo, whose second single, "Le cose che abbiamo in comune", became a radio hit in 1995 and received the Targa Tenco for Song of the Year.

In 1996 Silvestri released a double studio album, Il dado. His following studio set, Sig. Dapatas, was released in 1999, after Silvestri's appearance as a contestant of the Big Artists section in the Sanremo Music Festival with the track "Aria", which received the Mia Martini Critics' Award. In 2000, he released his first greatest hits album, Occhi da orientale, launched by the single with the same name, released in September of the same year.

In 2002, Silvestri released the single "Salirò", which won the Critics' Award at the Sanremo Music Festival of the same year and became a top 5 hit in Italy. In December of the same year, the song received four Italian Music Awards for Song of the Year, Composition of the Year, Best Italian Arrangement and Best Italian Music Video.

== Discography ==
=== Soloist ===
- 1994 – Daniele Silvestri
- 1995 – Prima di essere un uomo
- 1996 – Il dado
- 1999 – Sig. Dapatas
- 2002 – Unò-dué
- 2007 – Il latitante
- 2011 – S.C.O.T.C.H.
- 2016 – Acrobati
- 2019 – La terra sotto i piedi
- 2023 – Disco X

=== With Fabi and Gazzè ===
- 2014 – Il padrone della festa
