= Piccola Orchestra Avion Travel =

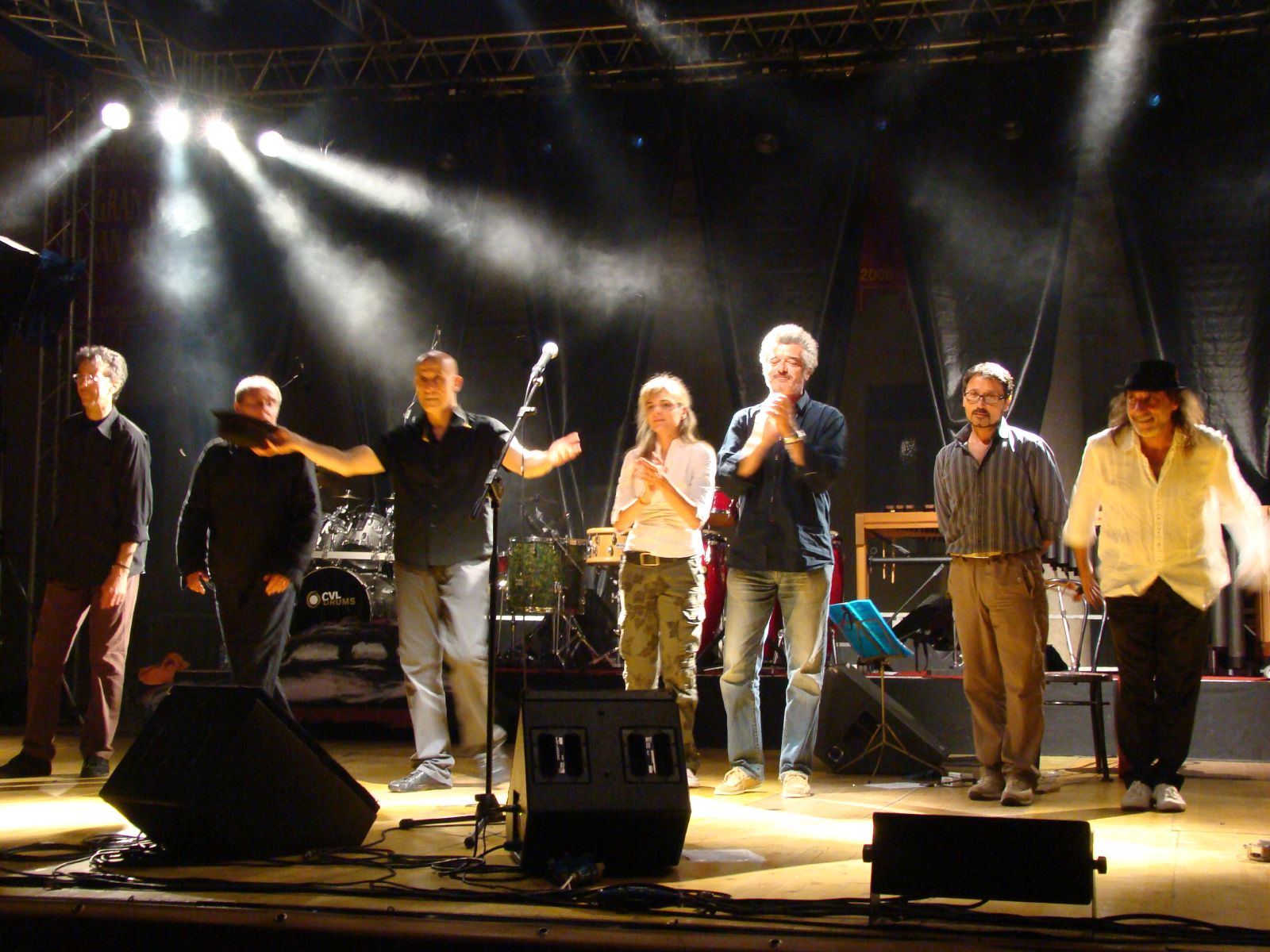
- Piccola Orchestra Avion Travel in 2007

Background information
- Origin: Italy
- Genres: Rock; jazz; pop
- Years active: 1980–present
- Labels: Sugar
- Website: www.avion-travel.net

Piccola Orchestra Avion Travel (also known as Avion Travel) is an Italian musical group, formed in Caserta in 1980. The group was named after a travel agency situated in Caserta. They were discovered by Caterina Caselli.

In 2000 the band won the Sanremo Music Festival with the song "Sentimento".

The lead singer, Peppe Servillo, is the younger brother of actor Toni Servillo.

== Current lineup ==
- Peppe Servillo – vocals
- Fausto Mesolella – guitar
- Mimì Ciaramella – drums
- Ferruccio Spinetti – bass
- Flavio D'Ancona – keyboards

=== Former Members ===
- Agostino Di Scipio – guitar
- Alberto D'Anna – drums
- Sergio Buzzone – drums
- Agostino Santoro – drums
- Nicola Di Caprio – drums
- Vittorio Remino – bass
- Mario Tronco – keyboards
- Peppe D'Argenzio – woodwinds

== Discography ==
=== Albums ===
- 1987: Sorpassando
- 1988: Perdo tempo (Bubble Record, BLULP 1827)
- 1989: In una notte di chiaro di luna (original soundtrack) (Bubble Record, BLULP 1831)
- 1990: Bellosguardo
- 1993: Opplà
- 1995: Finalmente fiori
- 1996: Hotel paura e altre storie
- 1996: La guerra vista dalla luna
- 1998: Vivo di canzoni
- 1999: Cirano
- 2000: Selezione 1990-2000
- 2000: Storie d'amore
- 2003: Poco mossi gli altri bacini
- 2007: Danson metropoli - Canzoni di Paolo Conte
- 2009: Nino Rota, l'amico magico

== Awards ==
- Premio della Critica Mia Martini at the 48th Sanremo Music Festival (1998)
- Winners of the 50th Sanremo Music Festival (2000)

Preceded by Anna Oxa	Winner of the Sanremo Music Festival; 2000	Succeeded by Elisa
