= Bruno Romani =

Italian saxophonist, flutist and composer (1960–2025)

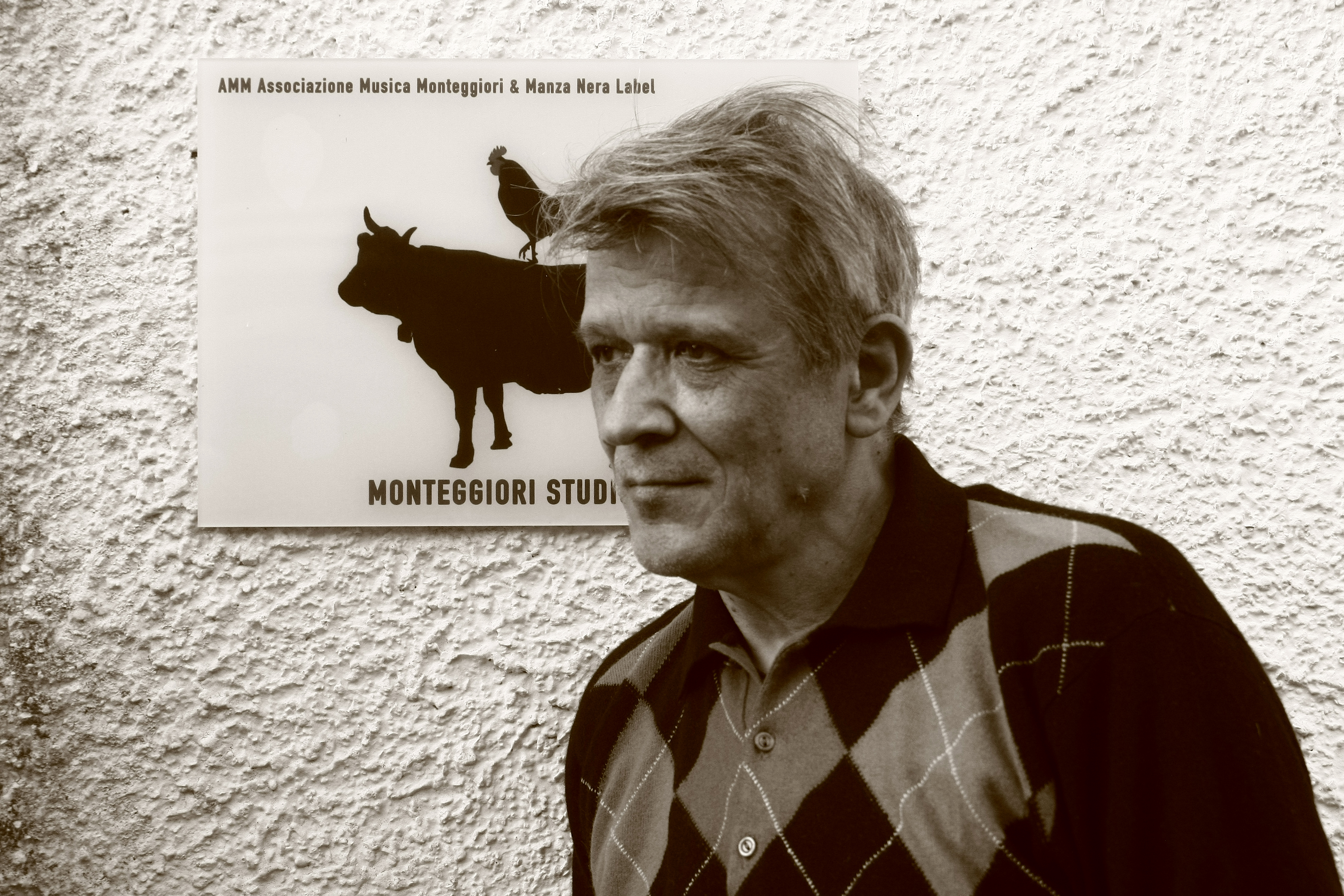
- Bruno Romani in front of AMM studio

Background information
- Born: 9 January 1960; Udine, Italy
- Died: 14 March 2025 (aged 65)
- Genres: Avant-garde jazz, Improvisation
- Occupation: Musician
- Instruments: Saxophone, flute
- Years active: 1980s–2025
- Labels: Splas(H) Records, Via Veneto Jazz, Fonoarte, Setola di Maiale

Bruno Romani (9 January 1960 – 14 March 2025) was an Italian saxophonist, flautist and composer.

Romani was the founder of Detonazione (one of the most influential Italian post-punk bands of the 1980s), author of contemporary jazz albums and collaborator as a sideman for important artists.

He was an arranger, composer and conductor ("the one who guides the improvisation").

Romani performed in concerts and on radio and television shows throughout Europe.

== Life and career ==
Romani studied flute in Udine with maestro Milos Pahor (first flute at the Trieste Opera House) and saxophone in Klagenfurt with maestros Kawarza and Heinz von Hermann.

At the age of 15, he was already part of a Udine jazz collective with Andrea Centazzo and Daniele D'Agaro.

In 1983, he founded the no wave/post-punk group Detonazione which between 1983 and 1989 recorded two albums and a series of 45 rpm.

With Detonazione, he participated in the first edition of the Biennial of Young Artists of the Mediterranean organized in Barcelona in 1984 to inaugurate a season of cultural rebirth and opening towards the future exactly ten years after the end of Francoism.

After Detonazione in 1989, jazz activity began. He made records as a leader and co-leader of numerous musical projects ranging from pop to avant-garde. In the 1990s he collaborated on the production of three Alice albums and participated in the Italian and European tour Pass The Years Tour Alice Visconti. Still with Alice, he collaborates on the realization of the first Devogue album with Gavin Harrison, Stefano Battaglia and other musicians of different musical backgrounds.

In 1995, he won the national competition organized by ARCI "Summertime in Jazz" as the best new jazz proposal of the year and awarded with the release of the album Gang of One. In the same year, he was selected among the six finalists of the first edition of the Massimo Urbani International Award.
In 1996, he won the competition organised by ISMEZ (National Institute for Musical Development in the South) for the creation of the "IS Ensemble" orchestra conducted by Paolo Damiani. With the orchestra "IS Ensemble" he recorded the live album of the same name at the Europa Jazz Festival in Bari.

In 2009, he was one of the founders of NoGuRu, a project born from the meeting of 4/5 of the Ritmo Tribale and Xabier Iriondo, a former Afterhours guitarist. The debut album Milano Original Soundtrack is the best-selling album in Fnac (distributor of the album) in its release week.

In 2016, he was invited together with the French Canadian saxophonist Guy-Frank Pellerin (student and then teacher of the Institute for Art, Culture and Perception founded in Paris by Alan Silva) to perform as a duo at the 30th edition of the Barga Jazz Festival.

He collaborated with AMM (Associazione Musica Monteggiori) in Lucca, where he founded the Monteggiori Ensemble, an ensemble of improvisers who play under the direction of different composers, alternating improvisation with written music. On 14 March 2025, Bruno died at the age of 65.

== Discography ==
=== As leader ===
- 1995 – White Illumination - Bruno Romani Trio (Centro Musica Creativa)
- 1996 – Gang Of One - Bruno Romani Quartet (Splasc(H) Records)
- 1998 – Live Evolution - Bruno Romani Evolution Trio (Splasc(H) Records)
- 2015 – Nightride Of An Italian Saxophone Player - Urbanightmare Bruno Romani Emanuel Donadelli (Revenge Records and Fonoarte)
- 2017 – As Serious As My Life - Bruno Romani Organic Crossover Group (Revenge Records and Fonoarte)
- 2019 – Versilia Afterdark - Bruno Romani Organic Crossover Group (Fonoarte and The Cotton Club)
- 2023 – CPPP Requiem - Bruno Romani Organic Crossover Group (Fonoarte and The Cotton Club)

=== As co-leader ===
- 1988 – Tarahumara - Romani And Cojaniz Duo (Tunnel Records)
- 2001 – Notes From The Borderline - Bruno Romani, Riccardo Morpurgo, Alessandra Franco (Nota)
- 2010 – Milano Original Soundtrack - NoGuRu (Bagana Records)
- 2013 – Via del Chiasso - The Star Pillow meet Bruno Romani (Setola di Maiale)

=== With Transition Jazz Group ===
- 1986 – Mode On - Transition Jazz Group (Bull Records)
- 1989 – Richard's Rumba - Transition Jazz Group (Splasc(H) Records)

=== With Evolution Reloaded ===
- 2013 – Seagulls - Evolution Reloaded (Manza Nera)

=== With Electro Acoustic Ensemble ===
- 2016 – Meditations in motion - Electro Acoustic Ensemble (Manza Nera)
- 2016 – Live al Visionario - Electro Acoustic Ensemble (Manza Nera)

=== With Soundadalick ===
- 2018 – Nero - Soundadalick (Manza Nera)

=== Collaboration with Alice ===
- 1992 – Mezzogiorno sulle Alpi (EMI)
- 1995 – Charade (WEA)
- 1998 – Exit (WEA)

=== Collaboration with other artists ===
- 1990 – Le Bambine - Le Bambine (Devon Rexcord)
- 1996 – Is Ensemble - Paolo Damiani featuring Roberto Ottaviano (Via Veneto Jazz)
- 1997 – Devogue - Devogue (Compagnia Nuove Indye)
- 1998 – Cjale Ce Sere - U.T. Gandhi Ensemble (Nota)
- 2015 – Compilation 1, 2 e 3 letteratura comparata - Carlo Monni & Banda alla Ciance (Goodfellas)

=== With Detonazione ===
==== Albums ====
- 1984 – Riflessi conseguenti (Tunnel Records)
- 1989 – Ultimi pezzi (Tunnel Records)
- 2010 – Sorvegliare e punire 1983/1984 (Sometimes Records)
- 2015 – Ultimi pezzi dentro me 1986/1989 (Again Records)
- 2018 – Anime in fiamme (Fonoarte and Again records)

==== EP and 7" ====
- 1983 – Sorvegliare e punire (Tunnel Records)
- 1984 – L‘Arido utile / Lamiera (Tunnel Records)
- 1986 – Dentro me (IRA Records)

==== Compilations ====
- 1984 – The Other Side Of Futurism - with the song Zingari In Viaggio (Tribal Cabaret)
- 1984 – Rockgarage Compilation Vol. 4 - with the songs Grigia Miseria and I Programmi Agli Inferi (Materiali Sonori)
- 1987 – F/Ear This! - A Collection Of Unheard Music, Unwritten Words And Unseen Images Inspired By Fear - with the song Dead Planet Blues (P.E.A.C.E.)
- 1995 – Rovina Hardcore - Live 1981-1985 - with the song Untitled (Provincia Attiva)

== Bibliography ==
- Cesare Rizzi, Claudio Sorge, Enciclopedia del Rock Psichedelico, Roma (Italia), Arcana, 1986, ISBN 8885008976.
- A: rivista anarchica nr. 165, Milano, Editrice A, 1989
- Tom Lord, The Jazz Discography, vol.19, Redwood (New York, USA), North Country Distributors, 1994, ISBN 978-1881993186.
- Tom Lord, The Jazz Discography, vol.23, Redwood (New York, USA), North Country Distributors, 2000, ISBN 978-1881993223.
- Luigi Onori e Flavio Massarutto, Note di frontiera: Jazz in Friuli-Venezia Giulia, Lestizza (Udine, Italia), Edizioni Colonos, 2001
- Roberto Franchina, Nuovo jazz italiano. Con CD Audio, Castelvecchi, Roma (Italia), 2003, ISBN 978-8-882-10015-5.
- Antonello Cresti, Solchi Sperimentali Italia. 50 anni di italiche musiche altre, Falconara Marittima (Ancona, Italia), CRAC Edizioni, 2015, ISBN 978-88-97389-24-8.
- Elisa Russo, Uomini - I Ritmo Tribale, Edda e la scena musicale milanese, Città di Castello (Perugia, Italia), Odoya, 2014, ISBN 978-88-6288-258-3.
- Stefano Gilardino, "Storia del Punk", Milano (Italia), Hoepli, 2017, ISBN 978-8820379452
