= Xabier Iriondo =

- Born: 9 February 1971 (age 54); Milan, Italy
- Genres: Experimental rock, avant-garde, rock
- Instrument(s): Guitar, homemade instruments
- Years active: 1992–present
- Labels: EMI, Setola di Maiale, Man's Ruin Records

Xabier Iriondo (Milan, 9 February 1971) is an Italian guitarist.

He was born in Isola neighborhood in Milan in 1971, Basque father and Italian mother. At the age of 17 he started to play the guitar. This passion for the strings still accompanies him. Between 1992 and 2001 he collaborated on five albums and hundreds of concerts with the alternative rock band Afterhours, 3 albums with the indie rock band Six Minute War Madness and 3 albums + 2 miniCD with the project A Short Apnea. From 2005 to 2010 opens in Milan "Soundmetak", a shop / lab where he sells musical instruments and organizes special musical performances. Since 2010 he restarted to collaborate with the group Afterhours.

== Solo album ==
Irrintzi

Studio album by Xabier Iriondo
- Released: 2012
- Genre: Experimental, Avantgarde
- Label: Wallace Records

Irrintzi is the only solo album by Xabier Iriondo, released in 2012 by Wallace Records – Phonometak – Long Song Records – Santeria – Brigadisco – Paintvox.

=== Track list ===
1. Elektraren Aurreskua
2. Irrintzi
3. Il cielo sfondato
4. Gernika Eta Bermeo
5. Reason To Believe
6. Preferirei piuttosto gente per bene gente per male
7. The Hammer
8. Itziar En Semea
9. Cold Turkey

== Discography ==
- 1993
  - Afterhours – Pop Kills Your Soul – CD – Vox Pop
  - Six Minute War Madness – faces vol.2 compilation – CD – Face Records
  - Six Minute War Madness – lubricant for your mind compilation – CD – Circus
- 1994
  - Six Minute War Madness – Arezzo wave compilation – CD – EMI
- 1995
  - Afterhours – Germi – CD – EMI
  - Six Minute War Madness – holy Joe / evensong – 7' – BluBus
- 1996
  - Six Minute War Madness – s/t – CD – BluBus
  - Six Minute War Madness – l'ora giusta / la tempesta" – 7' – Man's Ruin Records
- 1997
  - Afterhours – Hai paura del buio? – CD – Mescal
  - Six Minute War Madness – il vuoto elettrico" – CD – Jungle Sound Records
  - ARKHAM NUBES (iriondo, cantù, magistrali, ciappini) "no title" – CD
- 1998
  - Afterhours – male di miele – singleCD – Mescal
  - Afterhours – sui giovani d'oggi... – singleCD – Mescal
- 1999
  - A SHORT APNEA – s / t – CD – Wallace Records
  - Afterhours – Non è per sempre – CD – Mescal
- 2000
  - Afterhours – bianca – singleCD – Mescal
  - Afterhours – la verità che ricordavo – singleCD – Mescal
  - Six Minute War Madness – full fathom six – CD – Santeria/Audioglobe
  - A SHORT APNEA – illu ogod ellat rhagedia – CD – Wallace Records
- 2001
  - Afterhours – Siam tre piccoli porcellin – 2CD – Mescal
- 2002
  - A SHORT APNEA – an indigo ballad – CD – Wallace Records
  - A SHORT APNEA – five greeney stages – CD – Wallace Records
- 2003
  - 2partimollitremolanti – s / t – miniCD – Wallace Records
  - EAReNOW – ffrrr – miniCD – Wallace Records
  - Tasaday – Kaspar project – CD – Wallace Records
- 2004
  - A SHORT APNEA (with GORGE TRIO) – ...just arrived – CD – Wallace Records
  - POLVERE "s / t" – miniCD – Wallace Records
  - Tasaday – in attesa, nel labirinto – CD – Wallace Records
  - FOUR GARDENS IN ONE – s / t – miniCD – Wallace Records
  - UNCODE DUELLO – s / t – CD – Wallace Records
- 2005
  - BIAS – s / t – miniCD – Wallace Records
- 2006
  - END OF SUMMER – s / t – miniCD – Ame Records
  - OLEO STRUT – s / t – miniCD – Wallace Records
  - POLVERE – s / t – CD – Wallace Records
  - THE SHIPWRECK BAG SHOW – s / t – miniCD – Wallace Records
  - Zu/Xabier Iriondo – PhonoMetak series 1" – 10" – PhonoMetak labs / Wallace Records
- 2007
  - UNCODE DUELLO – EX ÆQUO – CD – Wallace Records
  - Polvere – s/t – 10" – Wallace Records/TwonTone/Minorità Records
  - OvO/Sinistri with Xabier Iriondo – PhonoMetak series 3" – vinyl 10' – PhonoMetak labs/Wallace Records
  - Kursk (soundtrack) "The Truth at the End" – DVD/CD – Amirani Records
- 2008
  - Damo Suzuki with Metak Network / ZU with X.Iriondo "PhonoMetak series 4" – vinyl 10' – PhonoMetak labs / Wallace Records
  - X.IRIONDO/G.MIMMO – "Your Very Eyes" – PhonoMetak labs / Amirani Records / Wallace Records / LongSong Records
- 2009
  - The Shipwreck bag Show "Il tempo ........... tra le nostre mani, scoppia" – CD – PhonoMetak labs / Wallace Records / LongSong Records
  - Gianni Gebbia / Stefano Giust / Xabier Iriondo – "L'edera, il colle e la nebbia" – CD – Setola di Maiale
  - EAReNOW "Eclipse" – CD – WallaceRecords / Amirani / ReR / PhonoMetak labs
  - UNCODE DUELLO "tre" – CD/10' – Wallace Records
- 2010
  - The Shipwreck bag Show "KC" – CD – PhonoMetak labs / Wallace Records / LongSong Records / PaintVox / Brigadisco
  - WINTERMUTE – "s/t" – CD – Die Schachtel
  - AN EXPERIMENT IN NAVIGATION "s/t" – CD – Die Schachtel
  - NO GURU "Milano Original Soundtrack" – CD – Bagana
- 2011
  - ?Alos/Xabier Iriondo – ?Alos – Ep 7" – Tarzan Records / Bar La Muerte
  - Damo Suzuki's Network – "Sette modi per salvare Roma" – CD – Goodfellas
- 2012
  - OLEO STRUT – "Bunga Bunga" – Vinile 12" – Phonometak / Komanull
  - The Shipwreck bag Show – vinile 7" – PhonoMetak labs / Tarzan Records / PaintVox /
  - Afterhours – Padania – CD – Artist First
  - Mistaking Monks "Mantic" – CD – PhonoMetak labs
  - Xabier Iriondo – Irrintzi – double vinyl 12" – Wallace Records
  - ?Alos/Xabier Iriondo – Endimione – Vinile 12" – Brigadisco
