= Manuel Agnelli =

Italian singer-songwriter

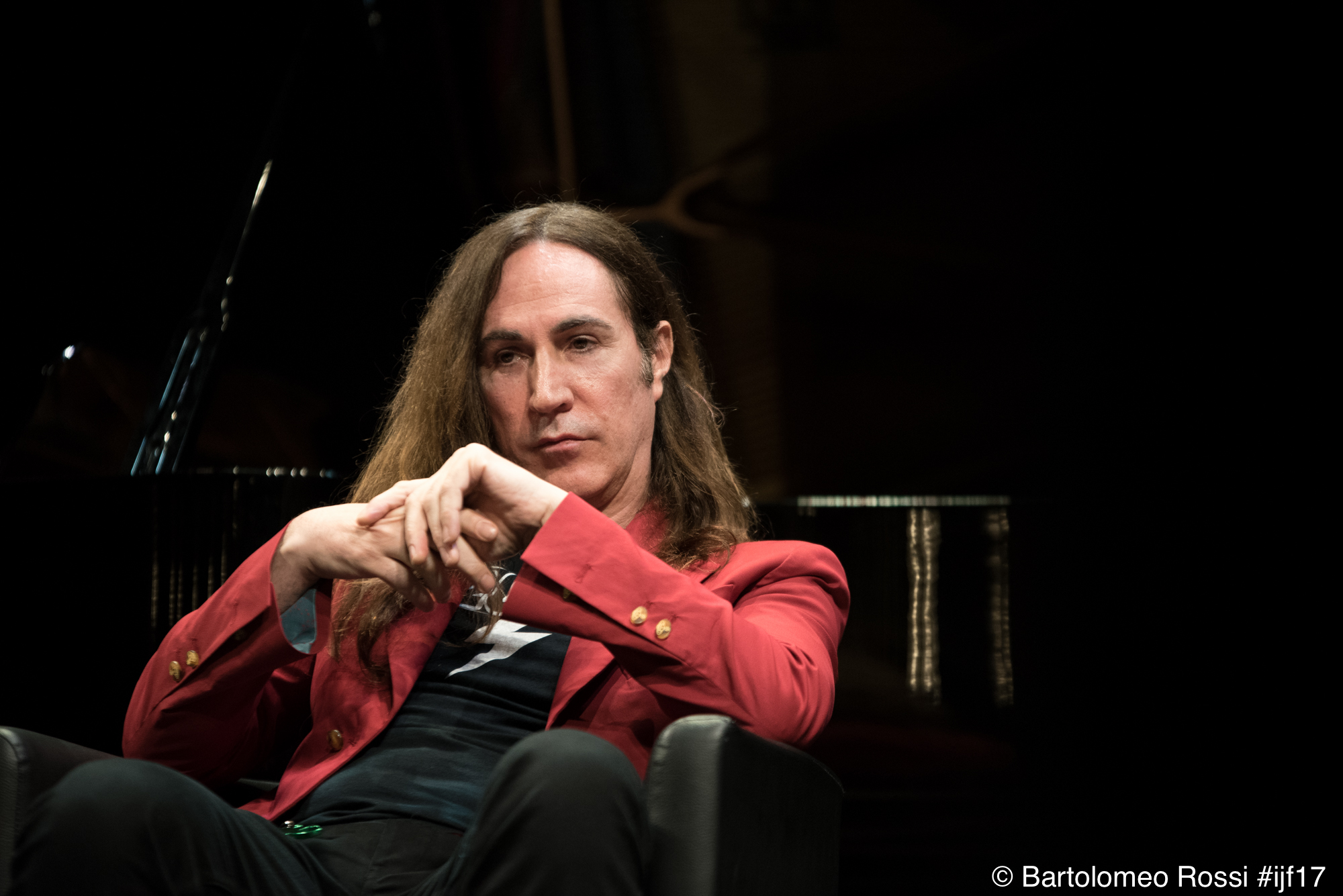
- Agnelli in 2017

Background information
- Born: 13 March 1966 (age 60); Milan, Italy
- Genre: alternative rock
- Occupations: Singer; songwriter; record producer
- Years active: 1985–present
- Member of: Afterhours

Manuel Agnelli (born 13 March 1966) is an Italian singer, songwriter, record producer, and frontman of the rock band Afterhours.

== Career ==
Born and raised in Milan, he graduated from the agricultural institute "G. Bonfantini" in Novara. In 1985, he founded the band Afterhours, which quickly established itself on the Italian alternative rock scene with successful albums such as Germi (1995), Hai paura del buio? (1997), Non è per sempre (1999), and Ballate per piccole iene (2005). The band also competed in the Sanremo Music Festival 2009 with the song "Il paese è reale", winning the Critics Prize.

From 2016 to 2024, he was a judge on X-Factor, participating in six editions of the show. In the 2017 edition, he mentored the rock band Måneskin, who finished in second place. He ultimately won the 2024 edition with his contestant Mimì Caruso.

In addition to music, Agnelli engaged in television projects, such as the program Ossigeno on Rai 3. During the Sanremo Music Festival 2021, he performed the song "Amandoti" by CCCP alongside Måneskin, who went on to win that edition of the festival. In 2023, he starred as Newton in the first Italian production of David Bowie and Enda Walsh's musical Lazarus, directed by Valter Malosti, which premiered at the Teatro Bonci in Cesena on 22 March 2023.

In 2022, Agnelli released his first solo studio album, Ama il prossimo tuo come te stesso, which was ranked third among the best Italian albums of the year according to Rolling Stone. His single "La profondità degli abissi", included in the soundtrack of the 2021 film Diabolik, won the Nastro d'Argento and the David di Donatello for Best Original Song. In November 2023, he received the Premio Pierangelo Bertoli at the Teatro Storchi in Modena.

In October 2026, Agnelli and Afterhours received the Premio Tenco career award at the 49th edition of the Rassegna della canzone d'autore in Sanremo.

== Discography ==
=== Studio albums ===
| Title | Album details | Peak chart positions |
| Title | Album details | ITA |
|---|---|---|
| Ama il prossimo tuo come te stesso | Release date: 30 September 2022; Label: Island, Universal | 6 |

=== Live albums ===
| Title | Album details | Peak chart positions |
| Title | Album details | ITA |
|---|---|---|
| An Evening with Manuel Agnelli (featuring Rodrigo D'Erasmo) | Release date: 22 November 2019; Label: Island, Universal | 52 |

=== Singles ===
==== As lead artist ====
| Single | Year | Album |
|---|---|---|
| "La profondità degli abissi" | 2021 | Ama il prossimo tuo come te stesso |
| "Proci" | 2022 | Ama il prossimo tuo come te stesso |
| "Signorina mani avanti" | 2022 | Ama il prossimo tuo come te stesso |
| "Milano con la peste" | 2022 | Ama il prossimo tuo come te stesso |
| "Lo sposo sulla torta" | 2022 | Ama il prossimo tuo come te stesso |

==== As featured artist ====
| Single | Year | Peak chart positions | Album |
| Single | Year | ITA | Album |
|---|---|---|---|
| "Adesso è facile" (Mina featuring Manuel Agnelli) | 2009 | — | Facile |
| "Ragazzo di strada" (Calibro 35 featuring Manuel Agnelli) | 2013 | — | Said (Colonna sonora originale) |
| "Lasciami leccare l'adrenalina" (Big Fish featuring Manuel Agnelli) | 2013 | — | Niente di personale |
| "Baby Run" (Sem & Stènn featuring Manuel Agnelli) | 2018 | — | Offbeat |
| "Argentovivo" (Daniele Silvestri featuring Rancore and Manuel Agnelli) | 2019 | 15 | La terra sotto i piedi |

== Filmography ==
Television
| Year | Title | Role | Notes |
|---|---|---|---|
| 2023 | Django | Oscar Beaunney | TV series; episode 3 |
