= Philip Corner =

American classical composer (born 1933)

- Born: April 10, 1933 (age 93); The Bronx, New York, U.S.
- Genre: Experimental
- Occupations: Musician, Composer, trombonist, pianist
- Labels: Setola di Maiale, Anthology of Recorded Music

Philip Lionel Corner (born April 10, 1933; name sometimes given as Phil Corner) is an American composer, trombonist, alphornist, vocalist, pianist, music theorist, music educator, and visual artist.

== Biography ==
After The High School of Music & Art in New York City, Philip Corner received his BA (1955) at CCNY, where his most important teacher was Fritz Jahoda; and an MA (1959) from Columbia University where his composition teachers were Otto Luening and Henry Cowell, The two years in between (1955–57) were spent in Paris at the Conservatoire Nat'l de Musique, following the class "Philosophie Musicale" of Olivier Messiaen. Equally important was his friendship with the Canadian painter Paul-Emile Borduas, who introduced him to "la grande aventure nord-américaine", to which he returned and became part of the group around John Cage. At the same time he resumed his studies of the piano with Dorothy Taubman, which was to have a significant role in his compositional as well as performing life. He taught Modern Music at the New School for Social Research from 1967 to 1970, inheriting the class founded by John Cage at double remove after Richard Maxfield, with whom he was teaching assistant, and Malcolm Goldstein. His teaching career started at a New York City high school and continued at the New Lincoln School where he helped develop the music department and introduced innovative courses (1966–1972). During this period he was married to the astrologer and trance medium Julie Winter who was also a minister in the Church of Religious Science, with which he too was associated, composing music to be sung at meditation sessions. From 1972 to 1992 he continued as professor at the newly established Livingston College, a part of Rutgers, the State University of New Jersey, soon to be absorbed into the Mason Gross School of the Arts. He then took early retirement and moved to Reggio Emilia, Italy where he had previous contact through the Pari e Dispari "Arte Club Internazionale". An early friend, the dancer and choreographer Phoebe Neville, joined him there and became his wife and performance partner.

As an early participant in pre-Fluxus activities since 1961, he was a resident composer and musician with the Judson Dance Theatre from 1962 to 1964 and later with the Experimental Intermedia Foundation upon the invitation of Elaine Summers, for whose dance company he served as musician. He co-founded with Malcolm Goldstein and James Tenney the Tone Roads Chamber Ensemble in 1963 (active until 1970), with Julie Winter Sounds Out of Silent Spaces in 1972 (active until 1979) and with Barbara Benary and Daniel Goode, Gamelan Son of Lion in 1976 (still active).

== Works ==
Corner became interested in calligraphy during military service in Korea in 1960–1961 and studied it with Ki-sung Kim; it is often incorporated into his scores. While there he became enamored with Korean traditional music, particularly the jeongak composition Sujecheon, which he describes as "the most beautiful piece of music in the history of the world." Many of his scores are open-ended in that some elements are specified, but others are left partially or entirely to the discretion of the performers. Some employ standard notation, whereas others are graphic scores, text scores, etc. His music also frequently explores unintentional sound, chance activities, minimalism, and non-Western instruments and tuning systems. Improvisation is important, though not exclusive; some "performance proposals" lead to a kind of ecstatic semi-trance. Contact with artists in other media, especially dance and the visual arts, as well as a long-standing interest in Eastern religions such as Zen Buddhism and study of the music of composers from the Baroque and Pre-Baroque eras, has likewise impacted his music.

Representative works include the ensemble pieces Passionate Expanse of the Law, Sang-teh/Situations and Through the Mysterious Barricade, among many others. Also in his incredibly large oeuvre are piano pieces (perfect, Pictures of Pictures from Pictures of Pictures), choral works (Peace, be still), electronic music (the war cantata Oracle), and more than 400 works in the Gamelan series, to mention only some of his catalogue. He divides his output into five periods, each one reflective of his attitudes at the time:

1. Culture, 1950s
2. The World, 1960s and 1970s
3. Mind, 1970s and 1980s
4. Body, 1980s and 1990s
5. Spirit; Soul, 1999–present

Frog Peak Music, a Composer's Collective, has undertaken to make as much as possible of his opera omnia available by on-order photocopy publication.

In 1962, Corner's "Piano Activities" became notorious by challenging the important status of the piano in post-war German homes in Wiesbaden, West Germany after concerts of antique musical instruments, the “Fluxus Internationale Festspiele Neuester Music” (Fluxus International Festival of Newest Music) was organized by the American artist George Maciunas at the Museum Wiesbaden to support a planned "Fluxus" publication. Fourteen concerts were performed on four weekends between 1 and 23 September. Corner's work in particular attracted press and public reaction, later seen as marking the beginning of the Fluxus "movement."

=== Non-musical activities ===
In addition to his work as a composer and musician, he has created numerous assemblages, calligraphy, collages, drawings, and paintings, many of which have been exhibited internationally. He has also written much poetry, which like some of his music, has occasionally appeared under his Korean pseudonym Gwan Pok, meaning "Contemplating Waterfall".In the late 1960s Corner's work was published in 0 to 9 magazine, an avant-garde journal which experimented with language and meaning-making. Editions in silk-screen have been brought out by the Archivio F. Conz, Verona, and Pari e Dispari Agency in Reggio Emilia, among others. Works are regularly exhibited in galleries, mostly in Europe, and are in notable museum collections. His principal gallery is UnimediaModern in Genova, whose director Caterina Gualco maintains a large collection. Other important collectors are Hermann Braun in Germany (deceased 2009) and Luigi Bonotto in Bassano who maintains an extensive documentation.

During "Mississippi Freedom Summer 1964" and for some of the following year, Corner was a civil rights volunteer and Freedom School teacher in Meridian, Miss. "Mark Levy Collection. Queens College/CUNY Rosenthal Library Civil Rights Archive." In 1968, Corner signed the "Writers and Editors War Tax Protest" pledge, vowing to refuse tax payments in protest against the Vietnam War.

== Discography ==
- "Philp Corner - Omnyphony Concentrate For A Multicultural Mix" (2019). Setola di Maiale SM3860 CD
- "Philp Corner - Dedalus" (2019). Setola di Maiale SM3850 CD
- "Philp Corner - In The Apartment House" (2017). Setola di Maiale SM3380 CD
- "Philp Corner - Through Mysterious Exotic Barricades: Asian & African" (2016). Setola di Maiale SM3080 CD
- "Philp Corner and Rahayu Supanggah - Together in New York" (2015). Setola di Maiale SM2760 CD
- "Rocks Can Fall at Any Time" Moremars (lp, 2013), Performed by composer. Contributed artists: James Fulkerson, Phoebe Neville, recorded 1972, 1989, 1997, 1999.
- "Gong(cymbal)/Ear in the desert". Innova 227 (2009).
- Philip Corner: Extreme Positions (2007). New World Records 80659-2 (2 CDs). The Barton Workshop (James Fulkerson, director)
- 40 Years and One: Philip Corner Plays the Piano (2000). XI 125. Performed by composer, recorded 1998.
- Breath Chant (1976). New Wilderness Audiographics 7701A. Performed by composer, recorded 1976.
- Metal Meditations (1976). New Wilderness Audiographics 7701B. Performed by composer, recorded 1976.
- More from the Judson Years, early 60s, Volume Two Alga Marghen 056CD (includes "Everything Max Has," "Big Trombone," "Homage to Revere," "Punkt," "Passionate Expanse of the Law" and "Expressions in Parallel").
- More from the Judson Years, early 60s, Volume One Alga Marghen 055CD (includes "Passionate Expanse of the Law," "Air Effect," "OM Emerging," "As Pure to Begin," "Music, reserved until now," and "Composition with or without Beverly").
- Gong + Alga Marghen 042CD (includes "Metal Meditations with Listening Center," "Gong!" and "Pulse Polyphony").
- Three Pieces for Gamelan Ensemble Alga Marghen 034CD (includes "Gamelan," The Barcelona Cathedral" and "Belum").
- On Tape from the Judson Days Alga Marghen 019CD (includes "Lucinda's Pastime," Memories:Performances," "From Thaïs," "Oracle, a Cantata on Images of War," "Flares" and "Circus Tape").
- Word-Voices Alga Marghen 4 VOC SON 010 (lp – includes "Vox," "Vocalise" and "Air Effect").
- Metal Meditations Alga Marghen (lp).

in production as of 2009 are recordings from die Schachtel, Pogus, A Silent Place, Locust, and more from Alga Marghen.

== Sources ==
- Fulkerson, James "Philip Corner – Extreme Positions". Liner notes. New World Records.
- Morrow, Charlie

== Bibliography ==
- Gunnar Schmidt. Klavierzerstörungen in Kunst und Popkultur. Reimer Verlag, Berlin 2012. ISBN 978-3-496-01475-1.
- Walter Zimmerman. Desert Plants: Conversations with 23 American Musicians. Berlin: Beginner Press in cooperation with Mode Records, 2020 (originally published in 1976 by A.R.C., Vancouver). ISBN 9783981331967.
