= I milanesi ammazzano il sabato =

Studio album by Afterhours
- Released: 2008
- Genre: Alternative Rock
- Length: 43:10
- Label: Universal

Afterhours chronology
Ballads for Little Hyenas (2006)	I milanesi ammazzano il sabato (2008)	Padania (2012)

I milanesi ammazzano il sabato is a studio album by Italian Alternative Rock band Afterhours, published May 2, 2008 from Universal Music.

On October 24, 2008 is also published in the reissue of the disc with a CD that includes six additional tracks and two unreleased live version: Due di Noi and You Know You're Right (Nirvana cover).

The title is inspired by Giorgio Scerbanenco' noir novel I milanesi ammazzano al sabato.

== Track listing ==
1. Naufragio sull'isola del tesoro - 1:39
2. È solo febbre - 2:11
3. Neppure carne da cannone per Dio - 2.23
4. Tarantella all'inazione - 5:09
5. Pochi istanti nella lavatrice - 4:09
6. I milanesi ammazzano il sabato - 2:13
7. Riprendere Berlino - 4:03
8. Tutti gli uomini del presidente - 2:15
9. Musa di nessuno - 2:16
10. Tema: la mia città - 2:44
11. È dura essere Silvan - 2:27
12. Dove si va da qui - 4:35
13. Tutto domani - 2:59
14. Orchi e streghe sono soli (ninna nanna reciproca) - 3:45

== Charts ==
Chart performance for I milanesi ammazzano il sabato
Chart (2008)	Peak position
Italian Albums (FIMI)	3
