= Setola di Maiale =

Italian record label

- Founded: 1993
- Founder: Stefano Giust, Paolo De Piaggi
- Genre: Avant-garde, experimental
- Country of origin: Italy
- Official website: www.setoladimaiale.net

Setola di Maiale is an Italian record label founded by Stefano Giust and Paolo De Piaggi in 1993. It was created to catalogue and release music in the fields of experimental music and avant-garde, including free improvisation, free jazz, electroacoustic music, and electronic music. Since its founding, Setola di Maiale has released over 400 recordings from musicians and ensembles from all over the world.

Artists on the label include Peter Brötzmann, Lawrence Casserley, Philip Corner, Vinny Golia, Joe Morris, Michiko Hirayama, Tim Hodgkinson, Tristan Honsinger, Ken Hyder, Xabier Iriondo, Joëlle Léandre, Gianni Lenoci, Anton Lukoszevieze, Bart Maris, Ela Orleans, Evan Parker, Ivo Perelman, Gino Robair, Paul Rogers, Bruno Romani, Giancarlo Schiaffini, Benedict Taylor, Gabriel Vicéns, Philipp Wachsmann, and Mia Zabelka.

== Discography ==
| Title | Release date | Artist |
|---|---|---|
| Carni A Meta Prezzo | 1993 | Le Bambine (Marco Cossetti, Stefano Giust, and Paolo De Piaggi) |
| Costalonga / Cossetti / Giust | 1993 | Mauro Costalonga, Marco Cossetti, and Stefano Giust |
| Margini Di Riciclo | 1993 | Stefano Giust |
| Immaginario Collettivo I | 1993 | Paolo de Piaggi |
| Ripercuotere | 1994 | Stefano Giust |
| Osservazione Stato Reale | 1995 | Osservazione Stato Reale (Fulvia De Colle, Andrea Ceschin, Gianantonio Gabbini, and Luca Lenoci) |
| One | 1995 | Ivan Pilat, Stefano Giust, Marco Cossetti, and Paolo de Piaggi |
| Grezza Musica Sbagliata | 1995 | Mauro Costalonga, Paolo de Piaggi, and Stefano Giust |
| Musiche Delle Circostanze | 1995 | Stefano Giust |
| Improv Series Zzaj | 1996 | Orbitale Trio (Stefano Giust, Ivan Pilat, and Paolo De Piaggi) |
| Fino Alla Fine (Computer Piece) | 1996 | Stefano Giust and Furio Rupnik |
| Nelle Nostre Stanze Vuote | 1996 | Lingam (Michele Brieda, Stefania Calzavara, and Sergio Cacherano Staropoli) |
| Opera Project I-III (1984-1988) | 1996 | Stefano Giust |
| Concerto Trasversale | 1996 | Orbitale Trio (Stefano Giust, Ivan Pilat, and Paolo De Piaggi) |
| II | 1996 | Lingam (Michele Brieda, Giorgio Brugnone, and Sergio Cacherano Staropoli) |
| Immaginario Collettivo II | 1997 | Paolo De Piaggi and Riccardo Tre |
| Cedendo Vincit | 1997 | Sergio Fedele / Trio Klang (Sergio Fedele, Sergio Cacherano Staropoli, and Filippo Tosi) |
| Avanguardia Clandestina | 1997 | Orbitale Trio (Stefano Giust, Ivan Pilat, and Paolo De Piaggi) |
| Avanguardia Clandestina | 1997 | Sergio Fedele / Trio Klang (Sergio Fedele, Sergio Cacherano Staropoli, and Filippo Tosi) |
| Avanguardia Clandestina | 1997 | Lingam (Michele Brieda, Giorgio Brugnone, and Sergio Cacherano Staropoli) |
| Seroxas | 1997 | Seroxas (Paolo De Piaggi, Riccardo Tre, Andrea Andriolo, and Piero Cossetti) |
| Alterazioni Sonore | 1997 | Gi-Napajo (Gi Gasparin, Ignazio Lago, Paul Lago, and Giò Lago) |
| Concerto Ai Tolentini | 1997 | Orbitale Trio (Stefano Giust, Ivan Pilat, and Paolo De Piaggi) |
| Margine | 1997 | Margine (Luca Cartolari, Stefano Giust, Andrea Biondello, and Alessandro Cartolari) |
| dal vivo 21.06.97 | 1997 | Anatrofobia (Alessandro Cartolari, Luca Cartolari, and Andrea Biondello) |
| L'implosione Poetica / La Metastasi Espressiva | 1997 | Trio Solzenicyn (Ivan Pilat, Kostoglòtov, and Denisovic) |
| Esplendor Lunare (Parte 1-2) | 1998 | Margine (Stefano Giust, Luca Cartolari, Alessandro Cartolari, and Paolo De Piaggi) |
| Immaginario Collettivo III / Sollazzo ed Afflizione | 1998 | Paolo de Piaggi and Riccardo Tre |
| Two | 1998 | Ivan Pilat, Stefano Giust, Marco Cossetti, and Paolo de Piaggi |
| Orbitale Trio Meets Hajjaj | 1998 | Orbitale Trio (Ivan Pilat, Paolo De Piaggi, and Stefano Giust) Hajjaj (Roy Paci andFred Casadei) |
| Nudocrudo | 1998 | Stefano Giust and Andrea Pezze' |
| GBUR | 1998 | GBUR (Dominik Gawara, Stefano Giust, Paolo Caleo, Lorenzo Razzano, and Marcello Turco) |
| Too Soon / Nihon Onkaku Shudan | 1998 | Fred Casadei |
| Ma | 1998 | Margine (Luca Cartolari, Alessandro Cartolari, Andrea Biondello, and Stefano Giust) |
| 10 London Lane | 1998 | Michel Le Maigne, Igor Alban Chevalier, Stefano Giust, and Alfredo Broccolo |
| Su Cio Potrei Gia Cantare... | 1998 | Sergio Fedele and Stefano Gipst |
| Three Feets For Trees | 1998 | Fred Casadei and Stefano Giust |
| Maisie Meets Fred Casadei and Stefano Giust | 1998 | Fred Casadei, Stefano Giust, Cinzia La Fauci, Alberto Scotti, Danilo La Fauci, and Gaetano Santoro |
| Concerto Agosto 1997 | 1998 | Anatrofobia (Luca Cartolari, Alessandro Cartolari, and Andrea Biondello) |
| Orwell Plus 15 | 1999 | Margine (Luca Cartolari, Alessandro Cartolari, Andrea Biondello, and Stefano Giust) |
| Astral Identities | 1999 | Dimension Idol and Stefano Giust |
| Integrale | 1999 | GBUR (Stefano Giust, Dominik Gawara, Paolo Caleo, Maurizio Suppo, Ivan Pilat, and Daniele Pagliero) |
| 48TH Biennale de Venezia | 1999 | Setola di Maiale Unit (Stefano Giust, Luca Cartolari, Dominik Gawara, Paolo Caleo, Maurizio Suppo, Ivan Pilat, Daniele Pagliero, Alessandro Cartolari, and Michele Brieda) |
| Pentliczek | 2000 | Pentliczek (Dominik Gawara) |
| Suoni Anormali Per Strani Animali | 2000 | (Ivan Pilat, John Rangecroft, Tony Bevan, Roberto Bellatalla, Marcio Mattos, and Stu Butterfield) |
| Cow Bone | 2000 | Victor L. P. Young, Ivan Pilat, and Stefano Giust |
| Composizio/Azioni | 2000 | Fastidipendentidrico (Francesco Calandrino) |
| The Mirror | 2000 | Fred Casadei |
| Pezzi Circolari | 2000 | Stefano Giust |
| New Vexations | 2000 | Stefano Giust |
| Venti Anni Dopo | 2000 | Muzic Circo (Edoardo Ricci, Roberto Bellatalla, and Filippo Monico) |
| Lume Srumentu Acciatu | 2001 | Iritur'Ararcamu (Francesco Calandrino) |
| Linked | 2001 | Stefano Giust |
| Letnica Sopot Hel | 2002 | Bianca Belmont (Dominik Gawara, Lorenzo Razzano, Marcello Turco, Max X, and Alberto Pasino) |
| Babelis Project | 2002 | Babelis Project (Daniele Pagliero, Dominik Gawara, and Stefano Giust) |
| Entomology | 2002 | Carlo Actis Dato, Gianni Lenoci, Vito Maria Lagorgia, and Marcello Magliocchi |
| Esperienza Elettrica | 2002 | Davide Modolo |
| Mangiacranio | 2002 | Stefano Giust and Daniele Pagliero |
| Ipersensity | 2002 | Ipersensity (Stefano Giust and Daniele Pagliero) |
| The Chromatic Spy | 2003 | The Chromatic Spy (Keisuke Ota, Yashuito Tachibana, Vito Maria Laforgia, Gianni Lenoci, Vittorino Curci, Roberto Ottaviano, Carlo Actis Dato, and Marcello Magliocchi) |
| Iritur'Ararcamu | 2003 | Iritur'Ararcamu (Francesco Calandrino with Chet Martino |
| Experience | 2003 | Marcello Magliocchi with Peter Kowald, Roberto Ottaviano, Carlo Actis Dato, Jim Dvorak, Salvatore Maiore, Gaetano Partipilo, Sabino Fino, Francesco Nicotri, Mirko Signorile, Lauro Rossi, Gianni Lenoci, Gianni Ricchizzi, Mario Volpe, Vincenzo De Luci, Vincenzo Deluci, Salvatore Maiore, Vittorio Gallo, Norontako Bagus Kentus, Vito Maria Laforgia, and Pino Minafra) |
| Moon Light In Maglie | 2003 | Mato Quartet (Carlo Actis Dato, Marcello Magliocchi, Yasuhiko Tachibana, and Keisuke Ota) |
| Viaggio Al Termine Delle Note | 2003 | Massimo De Mattia, Giovanni Maier, and Luca Grizzo |
| Please Don't, Maybe | 2003 | Kongrosian Trio (Federico De Pizzol, Ivan Pilat, and Stefano Giust) |
| La Citta E Piccola Di Notte E Mi Sento Un Cane | 2003 | Giuseppe Mariani, Vito Maria Laforgia, and Stefano Giust |
| Stanze Battute 6.4 | 2004 | Stefano Giust |
| Ritratti D'ombre (Original Movie's Soundtrack Without Movie) | 2004 | MLC Trio (Marcello Magliocchi, Gianni Lenoci, and Domenico Caliri) |
| Bloom Inside Bloom Outside | 2004 | Fred Casadei |
| Live at Teatro Miela | 2005 | Suonimmagine (Giuseppe Mariani, Vito Maria Laforgia, and Stefano Giust) |
| Live Turin '04 | 2005 | Rediffusion (Andrej Bako and Karen O'Brien) with Stefano Giust |
| Setola di Maiale Samples | 2005 | Setola di Maiale Samples |
| Live at Resonance 104.4 FM (LONDON 2005) | 2005 | Rediffusion (Andrej Bako, Karen O'Brien) with Stefano Giust and Gareth Mitchell |
| Dog Eat Dog | 2005 | Skinstrings (Fred Casadei and Stefano Giust) |
| Squame | 2005 | Squame (Alessandro Boscolo and Stefano Giust) |
| Live at Italian Jazz Rebels | 2005 | Fabio Sfregola, Giorgio Pacorig, Luigi Lullo Mosso, and Stefano Giust |
| Tapes to CD (1995/97) | 2006 | Daniele Pagliero |
| Parodia Del Dito | 2006 | Francesco Calandrino and Claudio Parodi |
| Duets | 2006 | Gianni Gebbia and Stefano Giust |
| Philtrum | 2006 | Gareth Mitchell |
| Second Issued | 2006 | Ipersensity (Stefano Giust and Daniele Pagliero) |
| Live at Cpa Firenze Sud | 2006 | Vortbar (Stefano Bartolini and Luca Vortex) |
| Chamber Music For Screeching and Artificial Insects | 2006 | Tiziano Milani |
| Inconcludenzia | 2006 | Switch Off (Daniele Brusaschetto, Pierluigi Brusaschetto, Daniele Pagliero, Maurizio Suppo, Mirco Rizzi, and Mauro Aloisio) |
| Live Exodus | 2006 | Squame (Alessandro Boscolo, Stefano Giust, and Mat Pogo) |
| Nei Paesi Novembre E Un Bel Mese Dell'Anno (18 Improvvisazioni Solitarie Dedicate a Cesare Pavese) | 2006 | Vittorino Curci |
| Abnormous Post Anomalous and Proto-Surrealistic Versions of Popular and Traditional Psychotic Songs | 2006 | Pentliczek (Dominik Gawara) |
| Live CPA Firenze Sud | 2006 | Squame (Alessandro Boscolo, Stefano Giust, Valeria Merlini aka JD Zazie, Walter Belloni, and Edoardo Ricci) |
| Mkultra | 2007 | Stefano Giust |
| L.S. | 2007 | Luca Sciarratta |
| Sketches | 2007 | Those Lone Vamps (Shawn Clocchiatti-Oakey and Vincent O. Trevisan) |
| Music As A Second Language | 2007 | Tiziano Milani |
| Guitar Solo (Live At The Foundry New York City) | 2007 | Ninni Morgia |
| Live At The Foundry New York City) | 2007 | Ninni Morgia and Jordon Schranz Duo |
| Supercoclea For New Apes | 2007 | Improvvirusoundexperience(Ivan Pilat, Flavio Zanuttini, Leo Virgili, Alberto Collodel, Davide Lorenzon, Efrem Silan, Carlo Ponara, Marco Giubini, Aurelio Toscano, Federico De Pizzoll, Andrea Cuzzuol, Giosuè Possamai, and Yannick Da Re) |
| Camusi | 2007 | Camusi (Patrizia Oliva and Stefano Giust) |
| Standards | 2007 | Those Lone Vamps (Shawn Clocchiatti-Oakey and Vincent O. Trevisan) |
| Antologia Del Medio Mongoholi Nasi | 2007 | St.Ride (Edo Grandi, Maurizio Gusmerini, and Mongoholi Nasi) |
| Drunk Upon Thy Holy Mountain | 2007 | Loloplasm & Punck (Laura Lovreglio, Paolo Ippoliti, and Adriano Zanni) |
| Nulla Esiste | 2007 | L'amorth Duo (Marino José Malagnino and Stefano Giust) |
| Black Taper Taiga | 2007 | Black Taper Taiga (Shawn Clocchiatti-Oakey, Matteo Perissutti, and Stefano Giust) |
| Assortimenti N.1-5 (Music For Drums and Sampled Orchestra) | 2007 | Ben Presto and Stefano Giust |
| Duel | 2008 | Duel (Massimo De Mattia and Denis Biason) |
| Non Solo // Untitled | 2008 | Jean-Luc Guionnet, Claudio Rocchetti, Fhievel, and Luca Sigurtà' |
| Live Somewhere | 2008 | Gareth Mitchell and Stefano Giust |
| Psychomagic Combination | 2008 | Joelle Leandre, Gianni Lenoci, Vittorino Curci, and Marcello Magliocchi |
| Twelve's | 2008 | Twelve's (Olaf Rupp and Chris Iemulo) |
| New Sad Epilogue Of My Nice Electronic Composer | 2008 | Venta Protesix |
| Live at Crash | 2008 | Crash Trio (Edoardo Marraffa, Chris Iemulo, and Stefano Giust) |
| Il Colombre | 2008 | Madame P (Patrizia Oliva) |
| Appunti Per Semiacusticherie | 2008 | Kar (Marco Carcasi and Adriano Scerna) |
| Crepa | 2008 | Renato Ciunfrini, Ben Presto, and Cris.Ex |
| Lonius | 2008 | Lonius (Andrea Romeo, Andrea Ics Ferraris, and Alessandro Buzzi) |
| Old Red City | 2008 | Edoardo Marraffa / Marco Tabellini / Vincenzo Vasi / Stefano Giust |
| Low Sun / High Moon | 2008 | Era Orleans |
| Experimental Open Session at SPM Ivan Illich | 2008 | GNU (Edoardo Marraffa, Fabio Costantini, Nicola Guazzaloca, Timothy Trevor-Briscoe, Daniele Bove, Gabriele Di Giulio, Christian Ferlaino, Diego Cofone, Chris Iemulo, Lucio Corenzi, Dario Fariello, Filippo Giuffrè, Luca Bernard, Salvatore Lauriola, Giacomo Vinci, Fabrizio Puglisi, Olivia Bignardi, Pierangelo Galantino, Alberto Fiori, Antonio D'Intino, Ryan Dow, Luigi Finelli, Andrea Manno, Marco Tabellini, Giovanni Falvo, Olaf Rupp, and Chie Yoshida) |
| Istinto Informe (Filmwork Serie B) | 2008 | Giorgio Pacorig and Franco Dal Monego |
| An Embassy to Kokus and Korus | 2008 | Those Lone Vamps (Shawn Clocchiatti-Oakey and Vincent O. Trevisan) |
| L'uccellaccio Malefico | 2008 | Yes Calandrin (Francesco Calandrino and Marco Calandrino) |
| Gluck Auf | 2008 | Edoardo Marraffa and Nicola Guazzaloca |
| Works 05-007-2008 | 2008 | Massimo Falascone |
| Mantis | 2008 | IOIO |
| Gariga | 2008 | A Spirale (Maurizio Argenziano, Mario Gabola, and Massimo Spezzaferro) |
| Eight - A Project In International Collaboration | 2008 | Bob Marsh with Marsh, Grant Strombeck, Bellerophone, Massimo Falascone, Boris Hauf, Marina Hardy, Earzumba, Renato Ciunfrini, Bryan Eubanks, Candy Covered Clown, Bryan Day, Zz Brr, and Arg) |
| Live | 2008 | Lendormin (Cristiano Luciani, Marco Maurizi, Renato Ciunfrini, Ken Ueno, Marco Visconti Prasca, D.B.P.I.T., and Luca Miti) |
| Freedom Reflex (One) | 2008 | Bogdan Dullsky |
| Remotion | 2008 | Blistrap (Mick Beck, Jonny Drury, and Stefano Giust) |
| 15 Improvisations For Solo Electric Guitar | 2009 | M Tabe (Marco Tabellini) |
| Rauspund | 2009 | Die Hohe Neunzehn (Edmund Steinberger) |
| L'edera, Il Colle, E La Nebbia | 2009 | Gianni Gebbia, Stefano Giust, and Xabier Iriondo |
| Master Artist Rental Car | 2009 | Maryclare Brzytwa |
| To/Song | 2009 | Dario Bruna and Karsten Lipp |
| The Breach | 2009 | Deaf Slug MD16 (Dominik Gawara) |
| Newtone 2060 | 2009 | Newtone 2060 (Cristiano Calcagnile, Marco Albert, and Salvatore Sammartino) |
| Trattamenti di Pace | 2009 | CLG Ensemble (Dario Bruna, Fabrizio Saiu, Maurizio Rinaldi, Andrea Valle, Manuele Incerpi, Annamaria Ferro, Gigi Gobbato, Roberto Olivero, Godurio, Giancarlo Vena, Renata Chiappino, Marco Di Tommaso, Maurizio Franciosi, Paolo Spaccamonti, and Chris Iemulo) |
| Parachuting Nonsense! | 2009 | Claudio Comandini, Joe Casagrande, Roberto Bellatalla, and Francesco Ranieri) |
| Stratos | 2009 | Massimo De Mattia |
| Mano Nera | 2009 | Ffatso (Stefano Ferrian, Dominik Gawara, and Stefano Colli) |
| Third Obstacle | 2009 | Gbur (Dominik Gawara, Stefano Giust, Ivan Pilat, Daniele Pagliero, Davide Lorenzon, Alessandro Fiorin Damiani, Alberto Collodel, Stefano Ferrian) |
| 12 Improvised Compositions For Solo Electric Guitar | 2009 | M Tabe (Marco Tabellini) |
| On Stage | 2009 | Blistrap (Mick Beck, Jonny Drury, and Stefano Giust) |
| Improvisations 1-4 | 2009 | Aghe Close Ensemble (Giorgio Pacorig, Nicola Guazzaloca, Paolo Pascolo, Gianluca Varone, Andrea Gulli, Chris Iemulo, and Stefano Giust) |
| Termite | 2009 | Pentliczek (Dominik Gawara with guests Lili Refrain, Yamori Kota, Lezet, and St.Ride) |
| Corde | 2009 | Corde (Francobeat, Antonio Gramentieri, Diego Sapignoli / guests Christian Ravaglioli, Xabier Iriondo, Guido Facchini, Max Ferraresi, and Luisa Cottifogli) |
| Razoj | 2009 | Razoj (Mario Gabola and Stefano Ferrian) |
| Jealousy Party Plus Eugenio Sanna | 2009 | Jealousy Party Plus Eugenio Sanna (WJ Meatball, Mat Pogo, Edoardo Ricci, Jimmy Gelli, Andrea Caprara, and Eugenio Sanna) |
| Meridians | 2009 | The Emergency String (X)tet (Adria Otte, Angela Hsu, Bob Marsh, Doug Carrol, and Tony Dryer) |
| Seamlessly | 2009 | Melly's Tree (Alberto Braida, Antonio Borghini, and Cristiano Calcagnile) |
| Live At Jiyu-Gakuen Myonichikan | 2009 | Hideo Ikegami |
| Sonic Sculptures | 2010 | Bellerophone (Dimitris Santziliotis) |
| The City Of Simulation (14 Audio-Visual Poems) | 2010 | Tiziano Milani and Luca Rota |
| Live At Radio Kairos/Reminder | 2010 | Gravida (MaryClare Brzytwa, Patrizia Oliva, and IoIoI) with Kanoko Nishi and Stefano Giust) |
| Improvisations For Nosyncopated Guitars | 2010 | Stefano Ferrian |
| Kid Steps | 2010 | Steve Potts, Gianni Lenoci, and Marcello Magliocchi |
| Free Fall | 2010 | Gianni Lenoci, Kent Carter, and Marcello Magliocchi |
| From The Tale Of Pigling Bland | 2010 | Maryclare Brzytwa / Nicola Guazzaloca, Edoardo Marraffa, and Francesco Guerro |
| The Spell and The City | 2010 | Gianni Lenoci, Bruno Angeloni, Juan Castañon, and Marcello Magliocchi |
| Panji | 2010 | Gianni Lenoci, Benat Achiary, Carlos Zingaro, Joelle Leandre, and Marcello Magliocchi |
| Free Improvised Music! Wien '09 | 2010 | Free Improvised Music! Wien '09 (Marco Eneidi, Wolfgang Reisinger, Mario Rechtern, Kilian Schrader, Hannes Krebs, Manfred Riolsperger, Patrizia Oliva, Stefano Giust, Martin Wichtel, Stefan Krist, and Herbert Lacina) |
| Byznich | 2010 | Maryclare Brzytwa |
| Seis Episodios En Busca de Autor | 2010 | Pablo Ledesma and Enzo Rocco |
| Atto Di Dolore | 2010 | Massimo De Mattia Quartet (Massimo De Mattia, Denis Biason, Bruno Cesselli, and Zlatko Kaucic) |
| The Leuven Concert | 2010 | Sureau (Jean-Michel Van Schouwburg, Jean Demey, Kris Vanderstraeten) with Gianni Mimmo and Enzo Rocco |
| March 2009 | 2010 | Wooden Plants (Ilia Belorukov, Andrey Popovskiy, and Dmitriy Krotevich) |
| Duel 2 | 2010 | Duel (Massimo De Mattia and Denis Biason) |
| Solo Immobile (Guitar Works) | 2010 | Pablo Montagne |
| Obliquiviali | 2010 | Gianni Mimmo and Elda Papa |
| Three Nights In Berlin | 2010 | Tobias Delius, Mikael Pellegrino, Stefano Giust, Clayton Thomas, and Chris Heenan |
| Trullo Improvisations | 2010 | Marcello Magliocchi, Bruno Angeloni, and Juan Castañon |
| Redshift | 2010 | Edoardo Marraffa, and Alberto Braida |
| Raw | 2010 | Carver (Ninni Morgia, Patrizia Oliva, Silvia Kastel, and Stefano Giust) |
| Cristalli Sonori | 2011 | Gian Luigi Diana with Patrick Holmes, Porra-Boy, Bojan Z., and Lisa Dowling) |
| Crudités | 2011 | Pablo Montagne and Giacomo Mongelli |
| Slow Life In The Age Of Hyper-Stressed Communities | 2011 | Gustavo Costa with Henrique Fernandes |
| M.A.B. Trio | 2011 | M.A.B. Trio (Marcello Magliocchi, Bruno Angeloni, and Matthias Boss) |
| Almost Tomorrow | 2011 | Matthias Boss, Gianni Lenoci, and Marcello Magliocchi |
| Gamra | 2011 | Gamra (Paed Conca, Eugenio Sanna, Patrizia Oliva, and Stefano Giust) |
| From The Tale Of Pingling Bland (Chapter Two) | 2011 | Maryclare Brzytwa, Nicola Guazzaloca, Edoardo Marraffa, and Francesco Guerri |
| Toba | 2011 | Toba (Patrizia Oliva, Tommaso Rolando, and Marco Ravera) |
| Oggetti Smarriti | 2011 | Paolo Sanna |
| Plot | 2011 | Rossella Cangini and Claudio Lodati |
| Fracture | 2011 | Fracture (Luciano Margorani, Luca Pissavini, and Andrea Quattrini) |
| One Morning In The South | 2011 | Ninni Morgia and Edoardo Marraffa |
| Stairwells | 2011 | Maryclare Brzytwa with Travis Johns |
| Mikiri+3 | 2011 | Massimo De Mattia with Massimo De Mattia, Denis Biason, Bruno Cesselli, Zlatko Kaucic, Luca Grizzo, Romano Todesco, and Alessandro Turchet |
| Name Of The Game | 2011 | Notg (Gianni Mimmo, Stefano Ferrian, Luca Pissavini, and Stefano Giust |
| Radial Chao Opera | 2011 | Radial Chao Opera (Gustavo Costa, Henrique Fernandes, and João Pais Filipe |
| Moregain | 2011 | Morgane Houdemont and CHRIS IEMULO |
| Descending The Bone Staircase | 2011 | Matt Lord and Mike McInerney |
| MU | 2011 | MU (Gian Luigi Diana and Jimmy Johnsen) |
| Metastanze | 2011 | Luca Pissavini |
| Laghima | 2011 | Laghima (Frederika Krier and Gian Luigi Diana) |
| Live At Mavv | 2011 | Gbur (Dominik Gawara, Stefano Giust, Ivan Pilat, Daniele Pagliero, Davide Lorenzon, Alessandro Fiorin Damiani, and Alberto Collodel) |
| The Farm Session | 2011 | Gianni Mimmo, Harri Sjostrom, Edoardo Arraffa, Chris Iemulo, Nicola Guazzaloca, Tristan Honsinger, and Marcello Magliocchi |
| Fonosextant | 2011 | Fonosextant (Gianni Lenoci, Gianni Mimmo, Matthais Boss, Norontako Bagus Kentus, Angelo Contini, Roberto Del Piano, and Marcello Magliocchi) |
| MCB | 2011 | Maryclare Brzytwa with Kanoko Nishi, Shayna Dunkelman, Tim Exile, Marla Hansen, William Winant, and Fred Frith |
| Cos'Altro | 2012 | Gian Luigi Diana, Stefano Giust, and Lorenzo Commisso |
| Tales Of The Flying Whale | 2012 | Nautilus Duo (Mirko Busatto and Paolo Calzavara [pax~]) |
| Behind The Window (Electric Guitar Improvisations About The Rain | 2012 | Sergio Sorrentino |
| Transition | 2012 | Transition (Nils Gerold, Nicola Guazzaloca, and Stefano Giust) |
| Sur Un Fil | 2012 | Éric Normand 5 (Jean Derome, James Darling, Éric Normand, Antoine Létourneau-Berger, Michel F. Côté) |
| Mind Fuel | 2012 | Tabozzivil (Utku Tavil and Fabrizio 'Bozzi' Fenu) |
| Immersus Emergo | 2012 | Sergio Sorrentino, Simone Telandro, and Luca Sigurtà |
| Touch | 2012 | Tiziano Milani |
| Uno | 2012 | Collettivo Di Resistenza Culturale (Paolo Sanna, Elia Casu, Angelo Contini, Silvia Corda, and Adriano Orrù) |
| Songs Of Cities In Jungles | 2012 | Travis Johns |
| Arbëria | 2012 | Patrizia Oliva |
| Cordale (Solo Compositions for Classical and Acoustic Guitar | 2012 | Pablo Montagne |
| Discovery Of Mysteries | 2012 | Tag Trio (Yoko Miura, Jean Demey, and Ove Volquartz) |
| Flash | 2012 | Elleffedi (Claudio Lodati, Antonio Fontana, and Tommaso deTesta) |
| Quatermass 1984-1986 | 2012 | Quatermass (Ross De Iulio, Roberto Del Piano, Massimo Falascone, Stefano Delù, Angelo Contini, Fabio Biolcati, Guido Mazzon, and Stefano Bartolini) |
| Life Is Knife / Systers | 2012 | Life Is Knife (Audrey Lauro and Isabelle Sainte-Rose) / Systers (Jean-Michel Van Schouwburg, and Audrey Lauro) |
| Improvising Dialogues | 2012 | Dialvogue (Andrea Bolzoni and Daniele Frati) |
| Travel | 2012 | Francesco Fornarelli and Giacomo Mongelli |
| 1994 | 2012 | Le Bambine (Marco Cossetti, Paolo De Piaggi, and Stefano Giust) |
| Instant Chamber Music | 2012 | Marcello Magliocchi, Matthias Boss, Paulo Chagas, and Maresuke Okamoto |
| Two Drums / Two Reeds | 2012 | Marcello Magliocchi, Ivano Nardi, Vittorino Curci, and Giuseppe Valzano |
| Lisboa Sessions | 2012 | Improvisers Consort (Marcello Magliocchi, Matthias Boss, Carlos Zingaro, Paulo Chagas, Paulo Curado, João Pedro Viegas, and Abdul Moimême) |
| One Hour with The Three Uncles | 2012 | Roberto Del Piano, Matthias Boss, and Marcello Magliocchi |
| Mysterium | 2012 | Vittorino Curci and Gianni Lenoci |
| Tone Um (Field Recordings Vol. 2) | 2012 | Patricia Oliva |
| Tabula Rasa | 2012 | How To Cure Our Soul (Marco Marzuoli) |
| Black Sky | 2012 | K-space (Tim Hodgkinson, Ken Hyder, and Gendos Chamzyryn) |
| Mondi Paralleli | 2013 | nDem (Gabriele Orsi, Luca Pissavini, and Cristiano Vailati) |
| Untitled 1-6 | 2013 | Patrizia Oliva and Jason Williams |
| Empty Chair | 2013 | Gianni Lenoci Hocus Pocus 4 + Taylor Ho Bynum (Gianni Lenoci, Vittorio Gallo, Pasquale Gadaleta, Giacomo Mongelli, Taylor Ho Bynum) |
| Fuwah | 2013 | Fuwah (Maddalena Ghezzi and Luca Pissavini) |
| II | 2013 | Fracture (Luciano Margorani, Luca Pissavini, and Ferdinando Faraò) |
| Cinque Galli In Fuga (PER TACER DEL SESTO) | 2013 | The Five Roosters (Mario Arcari, Martin Mayes, Massimo Falascone, Roberto Del Piano, and Stefano Giust) |
| Inner Songs | 2013 | Fabrizio 'Bozzi' Fenu, Michele Anelli, and Paolo Sanna |
| Spettro | 2013 | Cristian Naldi |
| Via Del Chiasso | 2013 | Star Pillow Meet Bruno Romani (Paolo Monti, Federico Gerini, and Bruno Romani) |
| The Beautiful Questions | 2013 | The Star Pillow (Paolo Monti and Federico Gerini) |
| Due | 2013 | Collettivo Di Resistenza Culturale (Paolo Sanna, Elia Casu, Patrizia Oliva, Francesco Guerri, and Stefano Giust) |
| To Max with Love (Omaggio A Massimo Urbani) | 2013 | Ivano Nardi, Eugenio Colombo, Roberto Del Piano, and Carola De Scipio |
| Live & More | 2013 | The Three Uncles (Matthias Boss, Roberto Del Piano, and Marcello Magliocchi) |
| Una Clamide Per Due | 2013 | Dup Klang (Sergio Fedele and Roberto Dani) |
| OST Quartet | 2013 | Nico Soffiato with Eli Asher, Greg Chudzik, and Devin Gray) |
| Elementi | 2014 | Luca Santini and Paolo Sanna |
| Freetrio | 2014 | Freetio (Achille Succi, Alessandro Sacha Caiani, and Davide Merlino) |
| Il Tempo Non Passa Invano | 2014 | Guido Mazzon and Roberto Del Piano |
| The View From Up | 2014 | Marco Rogliano, Francesco Dillon, Daniele Roccato, and Thollem McDonas) |
| Amarillo | 2014 | Goubleganger (Pat Moonchy, Lucio Liguori, Amaury Cambuzat, Angelo Avogadri, and Lino Liguori) |
| Tesla Coils | 2014 | Blaise Siwula, Harvey Valdes, and Gian Luigi Diana |
| Scatole Di Scarpe | 2014 | Pat Moonchy and Lino Liguori |
| At Mibnight Jazz Festival | 2014 | Transition (Nils Gerold, Nicola Guazzaloca, and Stefano Giust) |
| Trio Music Minus One (For Dennis Palmer) | 2014 | Thollem McDonas and Gino Robair |
| Monktronik | 2014 | Pasquale Innarella and Roberto Fega) |
| Act I: Notes In Freedom | 2014 | Schwingungen 77 Entertainment (Andrea Massaria, Enrico Merlin, and Alessandro Seravalle) |
| Octopus Connection | 2014 | Octopus Connection (Piero Bittolo Bon, Alberto Collodel, Marcello Giannandrea, Riccardo Marogna, Nicola Negri, Niccolò Romanin, Giambattista Tornielli, and Luca Ventimiglia) |
| La Chambre Des Jeux Sonores | 2014 | Alessandra Novaga |
| Apro Il Silenzio | 2014 | One Lip 5 (Guido Mazzon, Nicola Cattaneo, Franco Cortellessa, Giorgio Muresu, Stefano Giust / guests Alberto Mandarini, Claudio Lodati, Pat Moonchy, and Emanuele Parrini) |
| Cielo 2 | 2015 | Yoko Miura |
| Animal Spirit | 2015 | Claudio Lodati |
| Cascape | 2015 | Cu (Lucio Tasca and Nicola Pedroni) |
| Mondegreen | 2015 | Mondegreen (Adolfo La Volpe, Pierpaolo Martino, and Giacomo Mongelli) |
| Testing The System | 2015 | Sabir Mateen, Gianni Lenoci, and Giacomo Mongelli |
| Together In New York | 2015 | Rahayu Supanggah and Philip Corner RAHAYU |
| TACK! | 2015 | Anders Lindsjö and Jakob Riis |
| Materia (Storie Da Ciò Che Rimane) | 2015 | Tiziano Milani |
| 1983 | 2015 | Neem Teatrinz (Francesco Donnini, Edoardo Ricci, Massimo Falascone, Eugenio Sanna, Roberto Del Piano, and Filippo Monico) |
| Silent Noise | 2015 | Catania Violenta (Chris Iemulo, Giuseppe Schillaci, and Francesco Cusa) |
| Brzytwa/Golia | 2015 | MaryClare Brzytwa and Vinny Golia |
| Red Night | 2015 | 23Redadnts and Pablo Orza (Macarena Montesinos, Niet F-n, and Pablo Orza) |
| Corindilindoli | 2015 | Andrea Massaria and Giancarlo Schiaffini |
| Hanoi New Music Festival Ensemble 2013 | 2015 | Being Together (Lotte Anker, Jakob Riis, Nguyen Thanh Thuy, Ngo Trà My, Pham Thi Hue, Sonx, Kim Ngoc, Patrizia Oliva, Stefano Giust, Terje Thiwång, Henrik Frisk, Stefan Östersjö, and Burkhard Beins) |
| Le Point Triple De L'eau | 2015 | Maurizio Basilio, Fabrizo Bozzi Fenu, and Paolo Sanna |
| Bxl | 2015 | Sureau (Jean-Michel Van Schouwburg, Jean Demey, and Kris Vanderstraeten) |
| Boe | 2015 | Mass Sonora Concentrata (Gioele Tolu, Stefano Muscas / Alessandro Seravalle, Tiziano Milani, Gino Robair, Massimo Discepoli, and Davide Merlino) |
| Ghost Trio | 2015 | Musimprop (Massimo Falascone, Roberto Del Piano, Paolo Falascone, Filippo Monico, Angelo Contini, Edoardo Ricci, Stefano Bartolini, and Giancarlo 'Nino' Locatelli) |
| Ghost Trio | 2015 | Ghost Trio (Marco Colonna, Silvia Bolognesi, and Ivano Nardi) |
| Meats | 2015 | Massimo De Mattia |
| Rustrel & Paluds | 2015 | Sabu Toyozumi, Luc Bouquet, and Jean-Michel Van Schouwburg |
| Area Sismica | 2015 | Magimc (Edoardo Marraffa, Thollem McDonas, and Stefano Giust) |
| Free The Cat | 2015 | Sho-Shin Duo (Riccardo Marogna and Riccardo La Foresta) |
| Blind Mind | 2015 | Aghe Clope (Paolo Pascolo, Andrea Gulli, Giorgio Pacorig, and Stefano Giust) |
| Pow | 2015 | Gamra (Paed Conca, Patrizia Oliva, Eugenio Sanna, and Stefano Giust) |
| Miniatura Obliqua | 2015 | Paolo Sanna |
| Il Grande Drago | 2015 | Claudio Cojaniz, Massimo De Mattia, Franco Feruglio, and Alessandro Mansutti |
| Neu Musik Projekt | 2015 | Neu Musik Projekt (Guido Mazzon, Marta Sacchi, and Stefano Giust) |
| {} | 2016 | )))))((((( (Margaret Unknown and Markus Krispel) |
| TAI Fest #1 (Vol. 1) | 2016 | TAI No-Orchestra (Roberto Del Piano, Massimo Falascone, Filippo Monico, Walter Prati, Mario Arcari, Claudio Lugo, Alberto Tacchini, Pat Moonchy, Stefano Bartolini, Riccardo Luppi, Eugenio Sanna, Silvia Bolognesi, Paolo Botti, and Giancarlo Locatelli) |
| TAI Fest #1 (Vol. 2) | 2016 | TAI No-Orchestra (Roberto Del Piano, Massimo Falascone, Roberto Masotti, Alessandra Novaga, Paolo Botti, Mario Arcari, Giancarlo Locatelli, Silvia Bolognesi, Angelo Contini, Pat Moonchy, Edoardo Ricci, Robin Neko, and Gianluca Lo Presti) |
| Just Go There | 2016 | Plot (Claudio Lodati and Rossella Cangini) |
| Songs Of Deception | 2016 | Mérida Encuentro (Blaise Siwula, Armando Merid Martin, and Edgar Caamal) |
| Dola Suite | 2016 | Rävelden feat. Achille Succi (Luigi Bozzolan, Torbjörn Ömalm, Markus Larsson, and Achille Succi) |
| Kwatz! | 2016 | Kwatz (Enrico Caimi, Roberto Dani, Sergio Fedele, and Davide Negrini) |
| Love Is A Mystery Of Water and A Star | 2016 | Fred Casadei |
| Live Spomen Dom | 2016 | Jean-Luc Guionnet, Markus Krispel, Boris Janje, Stefano Giust, and Miklós Szilveszter |
| Through Mysterious Exotic Barricades: Asian & African | 2016 | Philip Corner |
| deComposition | 2016 | Laboratorio Musicale Suono C plus Peter Brötzmann (Peter Brötzmann, Donato Console, Giuseppe Mariani, Gianni Console, Walter Di Serio, Giuseppe Tria) |
| 10 Ensemble | 2016 | 10 Ensemble (Eugenio Sanna, Maurizio Costantini, Cristina Abati, Edoardo Ricci, Guy Franck Pellerin, Stefano Bartolini, Andrea Di Sacco, Marco Baldini, Giuliano Tremea, and Stefano Bambini) |
| Morfocreazioni I-V | 2016 | Alessandro Seravalle |
| Live At Masada | 2016 | Spiritsongs (Alberto N. A. Turra, Shanir Ezra Blumenkranz, Brian Marsella, and Sergio Quagliarella) |
| Apnea | 2016 | Luciano Caruso, Ivan Pilat, Fred Casadei, and Stefano Giust |
| Departure | 2016 | Yoko Miura and Gianni Mimmo |
| Modular Systems | 2016 | Jeff Platz, Blaise Siwuala, Dmitry Ishenko, and Dave Miller |
| Noise From The Neighbours | 2016 | Carlo Actis Dato and Enzo Rocco |
| Pantalica (A Site-Specific Recording) | 2016 | Tim Hodgkinson, Gandolfo Pagano, and Davide Barbarino |
| Numen - Life Of Elitra Lipozi | 2016 | Patrizia Oliva |
| Fassbinder Wunderkammer | 2016 | Alessandra Novaga |
| Radi Jamming | 2016 | Lo Dev Alm (Daniele Pagliero, Julia Kent, andAndrea Reali) |
| Classified | 2016 | Nervidi (Michele Anelli, Dominik Gawara, and Stefano Giust) |
| Luftschifffeiertafserinnerungfotoalbum | 2016 | Grosse Abfahrt (Frank Gratkowski, Kjell Nordeson, Lisa Mezzacappa, Phillip Greenlief, John Bischoff, Tom Djll, Gino Robair, Tim Perkis, Matt Ingalls, and John Shiurba) |
| Bushido | 2017 | Marco Colonna with Alberto Masala |
| Meditation On Ustvolskaja | 2017 | Luca Pedeferri Contemporary Project (Luca Pedeferri, Lionello Colombo, Mauro Gnecchi, Enrico Fagnoni, and Marco Menaballi) |
| Sounding Lines | 2017 | Neu Musik Duett (Guido Mazzon and Marta Sacchi) |
| Sampler and Zither | 2017 | Difondo (Sergio Camedda and Giampaolo Campus) |
| Terra D'Ombra | 2017 | Alessandro Ragazzo |
| Bellezza Fiammeggiante | 2017 | Eugenio Sanna, Massimo Simonini, Edoardo Ricci, Edoardo Marraffa, and Mirko Sabatini |
| Mychphilia | 2017 | Sho Shin Duo (Riccardo Marogna and Riccardo La Foresta) |
| Emergence | 2017 | Brennan Connors & Stray Passage (Brennan Connors, Brian Grimm, and Geoff Brady) |
| Dystopia | 2017 | Machine 3 (Gianni Lenoci, Pierpaolo Martino, and, Francesco Cusa) |
| Hypocenter | 2017 | Massimo De Mattia with Alberto Milani, Luigi Vitale, and Alessandro Mansutti |
| Air Current | 2017 | Yoko Miura, Ove Volquartz, and Gianni Mimmo |
| Correspondances (The Narrative Sessions Vol. 1) | 2017 | Federico Gerini and Massimiliano Furia |
| 2X | 2017 | 2X (Vito Maria Laforgia and Giuseppe Mariani) |
| Anja Kreysing / Ulrike Lentz / Vittorio Garis | 2017 | Anja Kreysing, Ulrike Lentz, and Vittorio Garis |
| In The Apartment House | 2017 | Philip Corner with Anton Lukoszevieze, Rhodri Davies, Nikos Veliotis, Phoebe Neville, David Ryan, Andrew Sparling, Alan Thomas, John Lely, Philip Thomas, Richard Benjafield, and Apartment House Ensemble) |
| Medea | 2017 | Medea (Marco Colonna and Cristian Lombardi) |
| Suonerie | 2017 | Antonio Mastrogiacomo |
| Learn To Love Solitude | 2017 | The Verge Of Ruin (Stefano De Ponti and Shari DeLorian) |
| Fields | 2017 | Enzo Rocco and Ferdinando Faraò |
| James Frederick Willetts | 2017 | Raoul Kirchmayr, Andrea Massaria, Alessandro Seravalle, and Gianpietro Seravalle |
| Sun | 2017 | Fred Casadei Spiritual Unity (Fred Casadei and Luca Venitucci) |
| Sky | 2017 | Fred Casadei Spiritual Unity (Fred Casadei and Francesco Manfrè) |
| Love | 2017 | Fred Casadei Spiritual Unity (Fred Casadei, Marco Colonna, and Stefano Giust) |
| Next Planet On The Way | 2017 | Atipico 4 (Carlo Actis Dato, Flavio Giacchero, Beppe Di Filippo, and Stefano Buffa) |
| Tre (Composizionimprovvisazioni) | 2017 | Ensemble Innondò (Stefano Cogolo, Alípio Carvalho Neto, Marco Pace, Marco Ariano, and Marco Resovaglio) |
| Für Otfried Rautenbach | 2017 | Luca Miti |
| It Doesn't Work In A Car | 2018 | Antonino Siringo-Yek Nur and Guy-Frank Pellerin |
| Bag Of Screams | 2018 | Peal (Paul Rogers and Emil Gross) |
| Citizen | 2018 | Marco Ferrazza |
| Dolenti Delitti Dolosi Dalle Dilette Doline | 2018 | Giancarlo Schiaffini and Giorgio Pacorig |
| Wasteland | 2018 | Wasteland (Rosa Parlato, Paulo Chagas, Philippe Lenglet, and Steve Gibbs) |
| Desidero Vedere, Sento | 2018 | Massimo De Mattia, Giorgio Pacorig, Giovanni Maier, and Stefano Giust |
| Rahsaan | 2018 | Rahsaan (Marco Colonna, Eugenio Colombo, and Ettore Fioravanti) |
| Light + Color + Sound | 2018 | Tiziano Milani |
| Suoni Lenitivi Per Adulti | 2018 | Alessandra Laganà, Tommaso Marletta, Dominik Gawara, and, Stefano Giust |
| Kammermusik | 2018 | Kammermusik (Giancarlo Schiaffini, Errico De Fabritiis, and Luca Tilli) |
| Friendship In Milano | 2018 | João Pedro Viegas and Roberto Del Piano |
| Ops...! | 2018 | Maresuke Okamoto, Guy-Frank Pellerin, and Eugenio Sanna |
| Finland Concert - Moony Moon | 2018 | YOKO MIURA with Teppo Hauta-aho, and Janne Tuomi) |
| Lone Pine Road Vol. 1 | 2018 | Thollem / Bisio (Thollem McDonas, Michael Bisio) |
| Trio Music Minus One (For Pauline Oliveros) | 2018 | Thollem / Robair (Thollem McDonas, Gino Robair) |
| Cahier De Petits Coquillages Vol. IV/V | 2018 | Tom Arthurs and Alberto Novello |
| Wuck U! | 2018 | Wu (Lorenzo Colocci, Federico De Bernardi di Valserra, and Luca Pissavini) |
| Saza Petra | 2018 | Guy-Frank Pellerin and Mathieu Bec |
| Exultation | 2018 | Luca Pedeferri Contemporary Project (Luca Pedeferri, Lionello Colombo, Enrico Fagnoni, Mauro Gnecchi, Marco Menaballi, and Fausto Tagliabue) |
| The Black Box Theory | 2018 | Luca Perciballi and Ivan Valentini |
| Du Vent Dans Les Cordes | 2018 | Matthias Boss and Guy-Frank Pellerin |
| The Land Of Blue Lichens | 2018 | Neu Musik Duett (Guido Mazzon and Marta Sacchi) |
| Hellenic Alley | 2018 | Alberto Braida, Andrea Bolzoni, and Daniele Frati |
| Le Bon Ton | 2018 | Tristan Honsinger and Eugenio Sanna |
| +4 Links N° 3 – Will (Perpective Flow Approach To Music) | 2018 | Luciano Caruso with Walter Vitale, Lorenzo De Luca, and Ivan Pilat) |
| The Last Taxi - Traveling Light | 2018 | Patrick Battstone featuring Marialuisa Capurso (Patrick Battstone, Marialuisa Capurso, Todd Brunel, Chris Rathbun, and Joe Musacchia) |
| Dreizweit | 2018 | Ove Volquartz and Peer Schlechta |
| Autocracy Of Deception – Vol. 1 | 2018 | Santi Costanzo |
| Search Versus Re-Search | 2018 | Stephen Haynes, Damon Smith, Matt Crane, and Jeff Platz |
| Pebbles & Pearls | 2019 | Dirk Marwedel, Jeff Platz, Georg Wolf, and Jörg Fischer |
| Sedition | 2019 | Blaise Siwula, Nicolas Letman-Burtinovic, and Jon Panikkar |
| Papa Legba Is Our Sensei | 2019 | Papa Legba Is Our Sensei (Alberto N. A. Turra and Alberto Pederneschi) |
| That Is Not So | 2019 | Patrizia Oliva, Roberto Del Piano, and Stefano Giust |
| Quando Ero Un Bambino Faro L'Astronauta | 2019 | Davide Rinella Armonica Cromatica Solo |
| Dedalus | 2019 | Philip Corner with Amélie Berson, Thierry Madiot, Deborah Walker, Silvia Tarozzi, Didier Aschour, and Sofi Hémon) |
| Omnyphony Concentrate For A Multicultural Mix | 2019 | Philip Corner (Jun-Y Ciao, Mo Sha, Yi Tao, Tian Wang, Fish, Meng Zhang, Shi Nuan Zhao, and Yun Qi Zhu) |
| Un Deux Trois Quatre | 2019 | Namu 3 (Steve Gibbs, Joachim Raffel, and Willem Schulz) |
| Live At Angelica 2018 | 2019 | Setoladimaiale Unit & Evan Parker (Evan Parker, Marco Colonna, Martin Mayes, Alberto Novello, Patrizia Oliva, Giorgio Pacorig, Michele Anelli, Stefano Giust, Phoebe Neville, and Philip Corner) |
| DC | 2019 | Andrea Dicò and Francesco Carbone |
| Geiger (Vol. 1) | 2019 | Ferdinando Faraò & The Space Improvising Componany (Ferdinando Faraò, Danilo Gallo, Simone Massaron, Enzo Rocco, and Martino Vercesi) |
| Echoes From The Planet | 2019 | Roberto Fega |
| Enthen | 2019 | Interlingua (Francesco Venturi and Francesco Fonassi) |
| Sonorovetro | 2019 | Sonorovetro (Dionisio Capuano, Carlo Fatigoni, Marcellino Garau, and Morena Tamborrino) |
| Virtutes | 2019 | Marco Napoli |
| An Aesthetic | 2019 | Francesco Cigana with Coro Nova Symphonia Patavina |
| Focus and Flow | 2019 | Banquet (Giulio Stermieri, Giacomo Marzi, and Massimiliano Furia) |
| Isla Decepción | 2019 | Sverdrup Balance (Lawrence Casserley, Jean-Michel Van Schouwburg, and Yoko Miura) |
| New York Portrait | 2019 | Nicola Perfetti |
| Celante | 2019 | Patrizia Oliva |
| WHAT'S THAT NOISE? | 2019 | Giancarlo Schiaffini and Giuseppe Giuliano |
| Raccolto | 2019 | Luigi Bozzolan and Eugenio Colombo |
| Samenreis | 2019 | Daspo (Giuseppe Pisano and Davide Palmentiero) |
| Haiku | 2019 | Haiku (Paolo Pascolo and Stefano Giust) |
| Bise – Improvisations Aux Flutes Traversieres | 2019 | Isophone (Rosa Parlato and Claire Marchal) |
| Jars – Improvisations Aux Flutes Traversieres | 2020 | Jars (Henry Marić, Boris Janie, and Stefano Giust) |
| Live In Hamburg | 2020 | Ensemble Collettivo Crisis (Pietro Frigato, Daniel Savio, Marco Bussi, and Davide Rossato) |
| Through Eons To Now | 2020 | Ombak Trio (Cene Resnik, Giovanni Maier, and Stefano Giust) |
| Ops | 2020 | Donatello Pisanello |
| Reality In Illusion | 2020 | Roger Rota with Marco Colonna, Francesco Chiapperini, and Stefano Grasso) |
| Myasmo | 2020 | Mia Zabelka |
| Strung Out Threads | 2020 | Ivo Perelman London String Project (Ivo Perelman, Phil Wachsmann, Benedict Taylor, Marcio Mattos, and Pascal Marzan) |
| Fumana | 2020 | Trio Eskimo + Luca Perciballi (Ivan Valentini, Alberto Bertoni, Enrico Trebbi, and Luca Perciballi) |
| Kammermusik & Elektrisk Guitar | 2020 | Kammermusik (Giancarlo Schiaffini, Errico De Fabritiis, Luca Tilli, and Jørgen Teller) |
| Hearoglyphics | 2020 | Duerinckx / Northover (JJ Duerinckx, Adrian Northover) |
| Strange Memories | 2020 | Guillaume Gargaud |
| Take The Long Way Home | 2020 | DC (Andrea Dicò and Francesco Carbone) |
| No Base Trio | 2020 | No Base Trio (Gabriel Vicéns, Jonathan Suazo, and Leonardo Osuna) |
| A Day In The Leap | 2020 | Thollem |
| Dust Of Light / Ears Drawings Sounds | 2020 | Ivo Perelman and Pascal Marzan |
| Offering – Playing The Music of John Coltrane | 2020 | Marco Colonna |
| Giuseppe Giuliano | 2021 | Giuseppe Giuliano with Giorgio Nottoli, Daniel Kientzy, Aldo Orvieto, Daniele Ruggieri, Simone Beneventi, and Ex Novo Ensemble) |
| Follow Fluxus | 2021 | Philip Corner & Julie's Haircut (Philip Corner, Luca Giovanardi, Amedeo Perri, Andrea Rovacchi, Andrea Scarfone, Ulisse Tramalloni, Deborah Walker, Simona Borrillo, Nicola Caleffi, Andrea Faccioli, and Laura Storchi) |
| Nothing | 2021 | Gianno Lenoci and Franco Degrassi |
| Fumatta | 2021 | Mattia Piani |
| Shelter For Soul | 2021 | Tiziano Milani |
| Essenziale | 2021 | Davide Rossato |
| Postcard From A Trauma | 2021 | Roberto Fega |
| Nine Improvisations For Sopranino and Guitar | 2021 | Marco Colonna and Enzo Rocco |
| ; | 2021 | Tabula Arsa (Michele Vassallo, Gabriele Pagliano, Lucio Miele, Paolo Zamuner, Eugenio Colombo, Marco Colonna, Francesco D’Errico, Carlo Roselli, Giulio Escalona, Mariateresa Franza, Francesca Simonis, Simone Palumbo, Fabrizio Spista, Viviana Ulisse, Mauro Mariano, Biagio Russo, Vincenzo Nanni, Andrea Parodo, Guido Cataldo, Matteo de Vito, and Valerio Petriachi) |
| Giuseppe Giuliano Plays Piano Works For Maderna | 2021 | Giuseppe Giuliano with Francesco Paradiso, Corrado Rojac, Giovanni Costantini, Fabio De Sanctis De Benedictis, Irlando Danieli, and Giancarlo Schiaffini) |
| Aeolian Duo At Edsviken | 2021 | Stefan Östersjö and Katt Hernandez |
| Small Talk | 2021 | Tristan Honsinger with Cristina Vetrone, Vincenzo Vasi, Luigi Lullo Mosso, Enrico Sartori, Edoardo Marraffa, Antonio Borghini, and Cristiano De Fabritiis) |
| Excantatious | 2021 | NoNoNo Percussion Ensemble (Gino Robair, Cristiano Calcagnile, and Stefano Giust) |
| Life Practice | 2022 | Mahakaruna Quartet (Giorgio Pacorig, Gabriele Cancelli, Cene Resnik, and Stefano Giust) |
| Centro Distopici Permanente | 2022 | Instant Duo (Marco Cristofolini and Julian Plaickner) |
| L'Attimo Fuggente | 2022 | Giuseppe Giuliano, Gabriel Bechini, and Amedeo Verniani |
| Forme E Racconti | 2022 | Marco Bellafiore |
| Le Melancolie Di Tifeo | 2022 | Sergio Fedele |
| Ginkgo | 2022 | Flavio Zanuttini |
| Small Parts Of A Garden | 2022 | Esther Lamneck, René Mogensen, Edoardo Ricci, and Eugenio Sanna |
| Oreste In Giardino | 2022 | Michiko Hirayama, Luca Miti, and Roberto Bellatalla |
| East Of Mozart | 2022 | East Of Mozart (Stefan Krist, Johanna Schlömicher, and Michael Prehofer) |
| Black Strata | 2022 | Massimo De Mattia |
| Folk! (Volume 1) | 2022 | Roberto Fega with Mike Cooper, Amy Denio, Arianna Consoli, Juliana Azevedo, Abderrazzak Telmi, Stefania Placidi, Michele Manca, Flaviana Rossi, and Patrizia Rotonda) |
| Folk! (Volume 2) | 2022 | Roberto Fega with Mike Cooper, Arianna Consoli, Juliana Azevedo, Sara Marini, Fabia Salvucci, Mubin Dunen, Amy Denio, Michele Manca, Flaviana Rossi, and Patrizia Rotonda) |
| Gentle Heartquake | 2022 | Guglielmo Pagnozzi with Davide Angelica, Salvatore Lauriola, Gaetano Alfonsi, and Danilo Mineo) |
| NBT II | 2022 | No Base Trio (Gabriel Vicéns, Jonathan Suazo, and Leonardo Osuna) |
| Luce Della Follia...Trama Invisibile...Eros Imperturbabile | 2023 | Giuseppe Giuliano with Manuela Galizia, Pierre-Yves Artaud, Gabriel Bechini, Rohan De Saram, Daniel Kientzy, Johnny Lapio, Mayumi Miyata, Ugo Nastrucci, Pietro Pompei, Enzo Porta, Corrado Rojac, Federico Scalas, Giancarlo Schiaffini, Dan Albertson) |
| Braastabra | 2023 | I Paesani Feat. Günter 'Baby' Sommer (Vittorino Curci, Donato Console, Gianni Console, Loredana Savino, Valerio Fusillo, Pierpaolo Martino, and Günter 'Baby' Sommer) |
| Ricordi Del Tardigrado | 2023 | Politácito (María ‘Mange’ Valencia, Paolo Pascolo, and Stefano Giust) |
| Mementi | 2023 | Donatello Pisanello |
| The Incredible Trip of The Whales | 2023 | Lorenzo Labagnara |
| The Absence Of Zero | 2023 | Massaria / Kneer / Hertenstein (Andrea Massaria, Meinrad Kneer, and Joe Hertenstein) |
| Komuso | 2023 | Mario Cianca Trio (Mario Cianca, Luca Venitucci, and Andrea Biondi) |
| Live At Metro Core | 2023 | Pond Waves (Errico De Fabritiis, Alberto Popolla, and Mauro Pallagrosi) |
| Urban Edges | 2023 | Francesco Fornarelli, Andrea Massaria, and Marcello Magliocchi |
| The Rambling Trio | 2023 | The Rambling Trio (Daniele Cavallanti, Alberto N. A. Turra, and Marco Cavani) |
| Sun Spells | 2023 | Jeff Platz, Joe Morris, Stephen Haynes, and Matt Crane |
| Zanshou Glance At The Tide | 2023 | Yoko Miura and Gianni Mimmo |
| Duos | 2023 | Mia Zabelka with Alain Joule and Tracy Lisk |
| We Remember Gianni | 2023 | I Paesani Feat. Michel Godard (Donato Console, Vittorino Curci, Gianni Console, Valerio Fusillo, Adolfo La Volpe, Pierpaolo Martino, Walter Forestiere, and Michel Godard) |
| A7OM1 | 2023 | Luca Pedeferri Contemporary Project (Pier Panzeri, Lionello Colombo, Enrico Fagnoni, Mauro Gnecchi, Marco Menaballi, Luca Pedeferri, and Fausto Tagliabue) |
