= K-Space (band) =

British-Siberian experimental music ensemble

- Origin: Tuva, Russia
- Genres: Electroacoustic improvisation, experimental, throat singing
- Years active: 1996–present
- Label: Ad Hoc
- Members: Ken Hyder; Tim Hodgkinson; Gendos Chamzyryn
- Website: www.hyder.demon.co.uk/K-SPACE.htm

K-Space are a British-Siberian experimental electroacoustic improvisation music ensemble comprising Scottish percussionist Ken Hyder, English multi-instrumentalist Tim Hodgkinson, and Siberian percussionist and throat singer Gendos Chamzyryn. The trio was formed in Tuva, Siberia in 1996. They have played in concerts in Asia and Europe, and released four CDs, including Infinity (2008), which was a new type of CD that is different every time it is played.

In a review of K-Space's second album, Going Up (2004), François Couture of AllMusic described their music as a mixture of "psychedelic shamanism" and "the strangest Krautrock you ever heard".

== History ==
Tim Hodgkinson, co-founder of the English avant-rock group Henry Cow, and Ken Hyder, founder of the Celtic/jazz band Talisker, first began collaborating in 1978. After one of Hodgkinson's concerts in Moscow in 1989, Hodgkinson asked Hyder if he would like to play "all of Russia". Hodgkinson, a social anthropology graduate, was interested in making contact with rural Russian musicians and ritual specialists. In 1990 and under the banner "Friendly British Invasion: in Search for the Soviet Sham(an)s", Hodgkinson and Hyder toured seven Soviet cities covering Siberia and Soviet Far East as well as Moscow and Leningrad.

This was the first of a series of study trips Hodgkinson and Hyder made to Siberia to explore shamanic culture. Initially little interest was shown in the duo, but soon they started to meet shamans and experience first hand shamanic rituals in which the shaman enters a trance state using drum and voice. This had a profound effect on Hyder and Hodgkinson. What interested them was the improvisational and musical aspects of the ritual, because it raised questions as to whether the psychological state of a performer is more important than musical technique. They began working with shamans from Tuva, Altay and Khakassia, and meet the musicians of Biosintes, "a kind of Tuvan Sun Ra band" which included Gendos Chamzyryn. Chamzyryn, a shaman from Tuva, played a variety of traditional Tuvan instruments and used the deep-vocal Kargiraa style of overtone-singing. Hyder and Hodgkinson invited Chamzyryn to join them on a tour of Altay villages in 1996. During this tour Chamzyryn took the unusual step of "shamanising" on stage, which had never been done before because the use of voice and drum by shamans is not primarily musical. But their performances were well received and the success of this experiment prompted the trio to form a group they called K-Space.

From 1999 K-Space began touring Siberia and later Western Europe, which included concerts in France, Germany, Austria and Italy. In 2005 they returned in Tuva and performed with local musicians and shamans.

=== Recordings ===
K-Space's first CD, Bear Bones (2002) contains recordings made by the trio between 1996 and 2001. For their next CD, Going Up (2004) they took K-Space performances recorded in Siberia and Europe, plus field recordings of shamanic rituals, and manipulated and superimposed them on one another to produce a sound collage of what Hyder called "total music". In 2008 K-Space broke new ground when they released Infinity, a new type of CD that is different every time it is played. It was created with the help of programmer Andy Wilson, and uses software to remix source material located on the disc to produce an "infinite" number of different musical pieces.

In 2013 a live album, Black Sky was released, which was recorded in Catania, Sicily.

=== Name ===
K-Space is short for Kozyrev-Space and refers to a space/time warp supposedly created by Russian astrophysicist Nicolai Kozyrev. Kozyrev believed that time was a channel for energy and built a device known as Kozyrev's Mirrors to prove his theory. When Hodgkinson and Hyder were in Akademgorodok, the educational and scientific centre of Siberia, they experienced first-hand the effects of Kozyrev's Mirrors.

Hyder has said that their second album, Going Up (2004) was directly influenced by the "esoteric theories" of Kozyrev.

== Members ==
- Ken Hyder – drums, vocals, amplified ektara, sampling, electronics
- Tim Hodgkinson – lap steel guitar, clarinet, electronics, alto saxophone
- Gendos Chamzyryn – vocals, percussion, amplified doshpulur, piano, cello

== Discography ==
- Bear Bones (2002, CD, Slam Records, UK)
- Going Up (2004, CD, Ad Hoc Records, US)
- Infinity (2008, CD, Ad Hoc Records, US)
- Black Sky (2013, CD, Setola Di Maiale Records, Italy)
