= Infinity (K-Space album) =

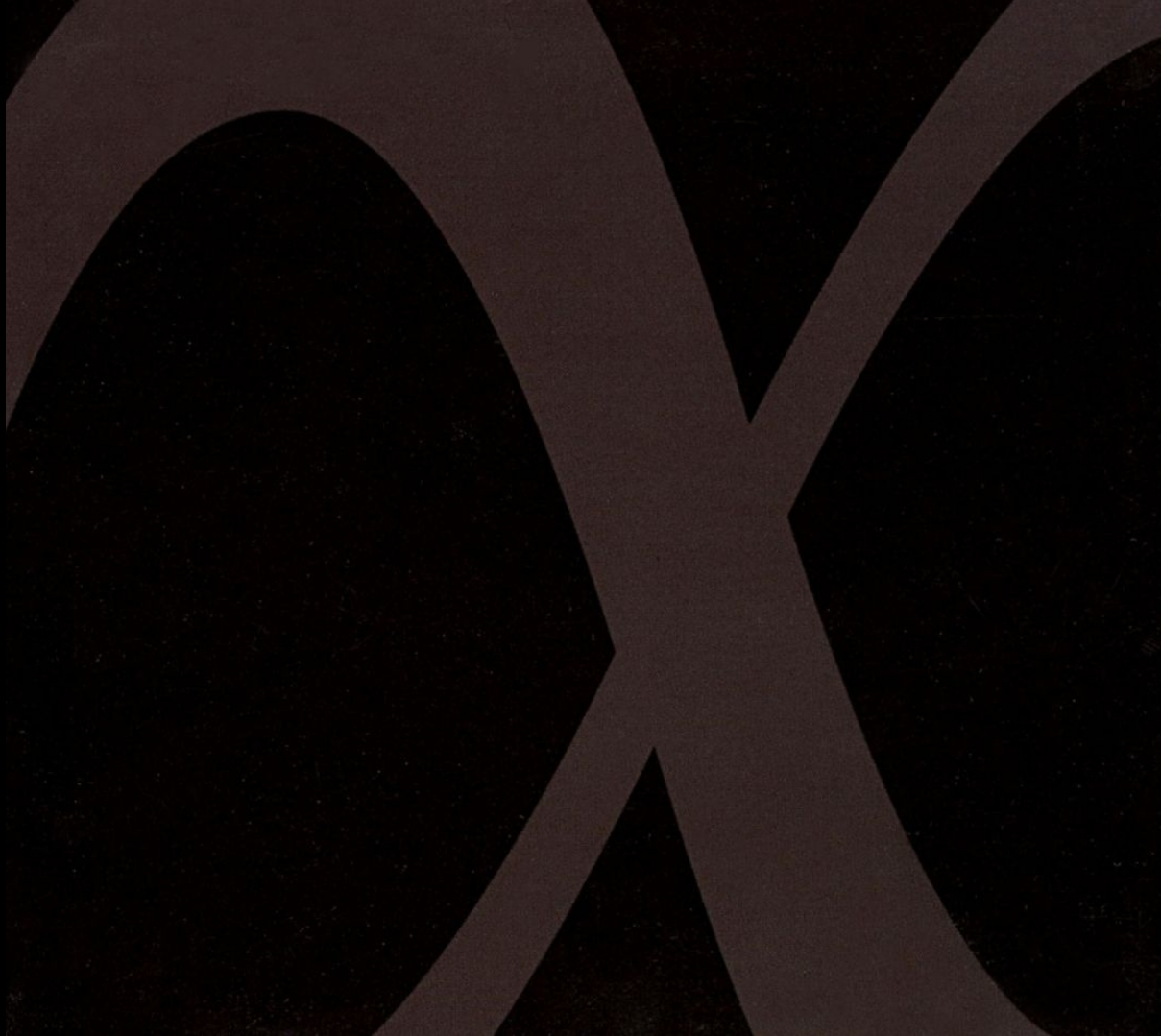

Studio album by K-Space
- Released: August 2008
- Genre: Electroacoustic improvisation; experimental; throat singing
- Length: 20:00
- Label: Ad Hoc (US)
- Producer: K-Space, Andy Wilson

K-Space chronology
Going Up (2004)	Infinity (2008)	Black Sky (2013)

Infinity is the third album by British-Siberian experimental music ensemble K-Space. It was released in the United States in August 2008 by Ad Hoc Records, an affiliate of Recommended Records, and was a new type of CD that is different every time it is played.

"Infinity" will not work in a standard CD player and requires a computer to play it. Each time the CD is played, supplied software remixes source material located on the disc and produces a new 20-minute musical piece. The CD cannot be paused or fast-forwarded, and there are no tracks to select. The only controls available are "PLAY" and "STOP".

The music produced by the CD is electroacoustic improvisation that is rooted in Tuvan shaman ritual music.

== Background ==
K-Space was formed in 1996 after a series of study trips to Siberia by Scottish percussionist Ken Hyder and English multi-instrumentalist Tim Hodgkinson. They were exploring the improvisational and musical aspects of shamanism when they met up with Gendos Chamzyryn, a shaman and musician from Tuva. Hyder, Hodgkinson and Chamzyryn formed K-Space to experiment with improvised music rooted in the Tuvan shamanic ritual.

Their second album, Going Up (2004) was a sound collage of K-Space performances plus field recordings of shamanic rituals, manipulated and superimposed on one another. Infinity extended Going Up's production process and made it dynamic to produce a new mix with each play.

== Technology ==
The idea for the Infinity project began when Tim Hodgkinson started describing some of the implicit rules that K-Space use during their live improvisations. It occurred to him that these rules could be embedded in software that would produce interesting variations on the original process. Hodgkinson discussed his ideas with Andy Wilson (aka The Grand Erector), a software designer and webmaster of German krautrock band Faust's website, The Faust Pages. They investigated ways to select sound files within different contexts and to use them in different ways to produce a new stream of music with each play. Wilson then set about developing "metacompositional" software that compiles and sequences deconstructed fragments of sound files. These sound sources were provided by K-Space and include field recordings, throat singing, various percussion, string and reed instruments. The number of audio files available were restricted by the size limitations of the CD format, but when combined and permutated, they would create an apparently infinite number of different "compositions", and hence the album title Infinity.

The audio files are categorized into a number of groups, including acoustic, live, solo, environmental and loops. A single audio file can be used in many different ways by varying, for example, dynamic levels, volume and duration of play. For a particular piece, for example, the software might select any two of seven acoustic files and play them together for x seconds, adding one of four environmental files after y seconds.

The sound source selection process the software uses is not random, but algorithmic based on scores Hodgkinson wrote for the project. Each time "PLAY" is pressed, the software selects a new score which it uses to construct a new piece of music. The score consists of a set of audio file selection criteria, which vary depending on what has happened before. While there are a finite number of scores on the CD, there are many different interpretations of each score.

Each play lasts about 20 minutes, a time span which was chosen with the shamans of Tuva in mind, and how each of their rituals produces a different journey. The 20-minute period of intense music was also chosen to deviate from the standard music CD playing times, albeit an "infinite" number of different 20-minute plays.

In October 2008 the software developed for this project was made available to anyone interested in working with it. Wilson also prepared a continuous play version of Infinity for the K-Space exhibition in the Stuttgart Ethnographic Museum.

== Reception ==
John Cavanagh of The Herald in Glasgow said in a review of the album that even though he knew each listening was the result of a "computer triggered sequence", it always sounded like a "cohesive musical work, as though it was meant to be that way".

== Requirements ==
"Infinity" must be played on a Windows PC or an Apple Mac computer. The computer software required to play the music is included on the CD. The computer must have a CD drive, a 200 MHz or greater processor, at least 1.5Gb of RAM, and a sound card or stereo interface.

== Track listing ==
No.	Title	Writer(s)	Length
1.	"Infinity"	Tim Hodgkinson, Ken Hyder	20:00

== Personnel ==
=== K-Space ===
- Ken Hyder – percussion, drum kit, dungur, voice, ektara, bass ektara, sound manipulation
- Tim Hodgkinson – lap steel guitar, clarinet, bass clarinet, klarnet, alto saxophone, voice, dungur, percussion, ocarina, sound manipulation
- Gendos Chamzyryn – voice, dungur, percussion, dopshuluur, chadagan, cello, khomous, ocarina

=== Software development ===
- Andy Wilson – programming, technical assistance, oversight

== Works cited ==
- Cavanagh, John (7 September 2008). "Infinity". The Herald. ISSN 0965-9439..
