= Ken Hyder =

- Born: Ken Hyder; 29 June 1946 (age 80)
- Origin: Dundee, Scotland
- Genre: Jazz
- Instruments: drums percussion
- Labels: ECM, Setola di Maiale, Konnex
- Website: sites.google.com/view/kentalisker

Ken Hyder (born 29 June 1946) is a Scottish jazz fusion drummer and percussionist born in Dundee, Scotland, perhaps best known for combining folk, ethnic and Celtic music with jazz.

== Career ==
Hyder has worked with and recorded with many musicians, including Elton Dean, Chris Biscoe, Tim Hodgkinson, Paul Rogers, Maggie Nicols, Don Paterson, Mark Hewins and Frankie Armstrong.

He has also worked with Dick Gaughan, Vladimir Rezitsky, Phil Minton, the Scottish Lindsay L. Cooper, Sainkho Namtchylak, Jo'burg Hawk, Marcio Mattos, Jim Dvorak, John Edwards, Dave Webster, John Rangecroft, Radik Tyulyush, Julian Bahula, Lucky Ranku, Larry Stabbins, Harry Beckett, Art Themen, Gary Windo, Pete McPhail, Keith Tippett, Harry Miller, Nick Evans, Raymond Macdonald, Ntshuks Bonga, Hamish Henderson, Jon Dobie, and Lello Colombo.

Hyder has been playing and composing music for over 40 years. In that time he has produced more than three dozen albums of original material. He began playing jazz in Scotland before moving south to London where he played at the Little Theatre Club at Garrick Yard, St Martin's Lane - an avant garde haunt, run by John Stevens (1940–1994).

In 1970, Hyder formed Talisker, and went on to make six albums with this pioneering and proto-type Celtic jazz group. In the 1970s, he began moving away from jazz and into collaborations with musicians from different musical backgrounds, including Irish, South African and South American players. Later, he became interested in exploring spiritual aspects of music with spiritual practitioners like Tibetan and Japanese Buddhist monks, and Siberian shamans.

Scotland and Siberia are now the strongest influences in his current work.

Hyder's projects include K-Space, with Tim Hodgkinson and Gendos Chamzyryn; Hoots and Roots with Scottish singer Maggie Nicols; RealTime with z'ev, Andy Knight and Scipio; Raz3 with Hodgkinson and Lu Edmonds; A revived Talisker, with Nicols and Raymond MacDonald, plus a duo with pianist Vladimir Miller.

Most of his recent releases are on Ad Hoc records, Ayler Records, and SLAM.

Hyder has published several books. Black Sky, White Sky is an e-book novel based on shamanism in Siberia. His second novel, Hack Attack, is about cyber crime and cyber terrorism. He has also published a memoir titled How to Know - Spirit Music - Crazy Wisdom, Shamanism and Trips to the Black Sky.

== Discography ==
Talisker

- Dreaming of Glenisla (1975, Virgin Records)
- Land of Stone (1977, ECM)
- The Last Battle (1978, View)
- The White Light (1980, View)
- Humanity (1986, Impetus Records)

The Big Team

- Under the Influence (1984, Konnex Records)

Dave Brooks / Ken Hyder

- Piping Hot (1985, Silly Boy Lemon Records)

Dick Gaughan / Ken Hyder

- Fanfare For Tomorrow (1985, Impetus Records)

Tim Hodgkinson / Ken Hyder

- Shams (1987, Impetus Records)
- Burghan Interference: Shams (2000, Slam Records)

Hodgkinson / Ken Hyder / Ponomaryova

- The Goose (1992, Woof Records)

Tomas Lynch

- The Crux of the Catalogue (1993, Linecheck Records)

Vladimir Rezitsky

- Golden Years of the Soviet New Jazz Vol 2 (1993, Leo Records)
- Hot Sounds from the Arctic (1994, Leo Records)

Chanter

- Roots Run Deep (1995, Twang Dynasty Records)

Bing Selfish

- Binging It All Back Home (Out of Depression Records)

Tshisa!

- Urban Ritual (1995, Slam Records)

Bardo State Orchestra

- The Ultimate Gift (1995, Impetus Records)

Bardo State Orchestra with Tibetan monks from the Shechen monastery

- Wheels Within Wheels (1996, Impetus Records)

Northern Lights

- Stillness in the Solovki (1998, Long Arms Records)

Hyder with Nicols / Brooks

- The Known is in the Stone (1998, Impetus Records)

K-Space

- Bear Bones (2002, Slam Records)
- Going Up (2004, Ad Hoc Records)
- Infinity (2008, Ad Hoc Records)
- Black Sky (2013, Setola di Maiale Records)

Ken Hyder / Bret Hart

- Duets - Volume One (2003, InstrumenTales Masterdisc Library, USA)

Ken Hyder / Vladimir Miller

- Counting on Angels (2003, Slam Records)

The Dynamix

- We See Us in the Next Future (2003, Konnex Records)

RealTime

- In the Shaman's Pocket (2008, Ayler Records)

Hoots and Roots with Maggie Nicols

- Life and Death (2009, Ayler Records)
- Ghost Time – z’ev, Andy Knight, Ken Hyder – Hinterzimmer Records
- Angel Ontalva and the Shamfonk Rhythm Section with Scipio mini-CD
- Talisker – with Paul Rogers, bass and Ted Emmett, trumpet
- Black Sky – K-Space – Setola di Maiale
- Cold Warm - with Vladimir Miller - Eastov Records
- Siberia Extreme - from a trio of singer Chyskyyrai, Tim Hodgkinson and Hyder.
- Spectrum - by La Dolce Visa, recorded in Sicily with Piero La Rocca.
