= Hai paura del buio? =

Studio album by Afterhours
- Released: 1997
- Recorded: 1997
- Genre: Alternative Rock, Noise rock, Psychedelic rock, Post-grunge
- Length: 65:28
- Label: Mescal Records

Afterhours chronology
Germi (1995)	Hai paura del buio? (1997)	Non è per sempre (1999)

Hai paura del buio? is the fourth studio album by Italian Alternative Rock band Afterhours. Like its predecessor, Germi, Hai paura del buio? features only Italian language. The album is also considered by fans Afterhours' best work.

== Track listing ==
1. "Hai paura del buio?" – 0:34
2. "1.9.9.6." – 3:41
3. "Male di miele" – 2:43
4. "Rapace" – 5:36
5. "Elymania" – 3:37
6. "Pelle" – 5:10
7. "Dea" – 1:40
8. "Senza finestra" – 2:46
9. "Simbiosi" – 4:13
10. "Voglio una pelle splendida" – 3:41
11. "Terrorswing" – 2:49
12. "Lasciami leccare l'adrenalina" – 1:18
13. "Punto G" – 5:44
14. "Veleno" – 3:45
15. "Come vorrei" – 3:06
16. "Questo pazzo pazzo mondo di tasse" – 2:59
17. "Musicista contabile" – 5:30
18. "Sui giovani d'oggi ci scatarro su" – 2:57
19. "Mi trovo nuovo" – 3:39

All songs composed by Afterhours.

== Credits ==
- Manuel Agnelli − vocals
- Xabier Iriondo Gemmi − lead guitar, rhythm guitar
- Dario Ciffo − violin
- Alessandro Zerilli − bass guitar
- Giorgio Prette − drums

== Charts ==
Chart performance for Hai paura del buio? Reloaded and Remastered
Chart (2014)	Peak position
Italian Albums (FIMI)	2
