= Afterhours (band) =

Italian alternative rock band (1985– )

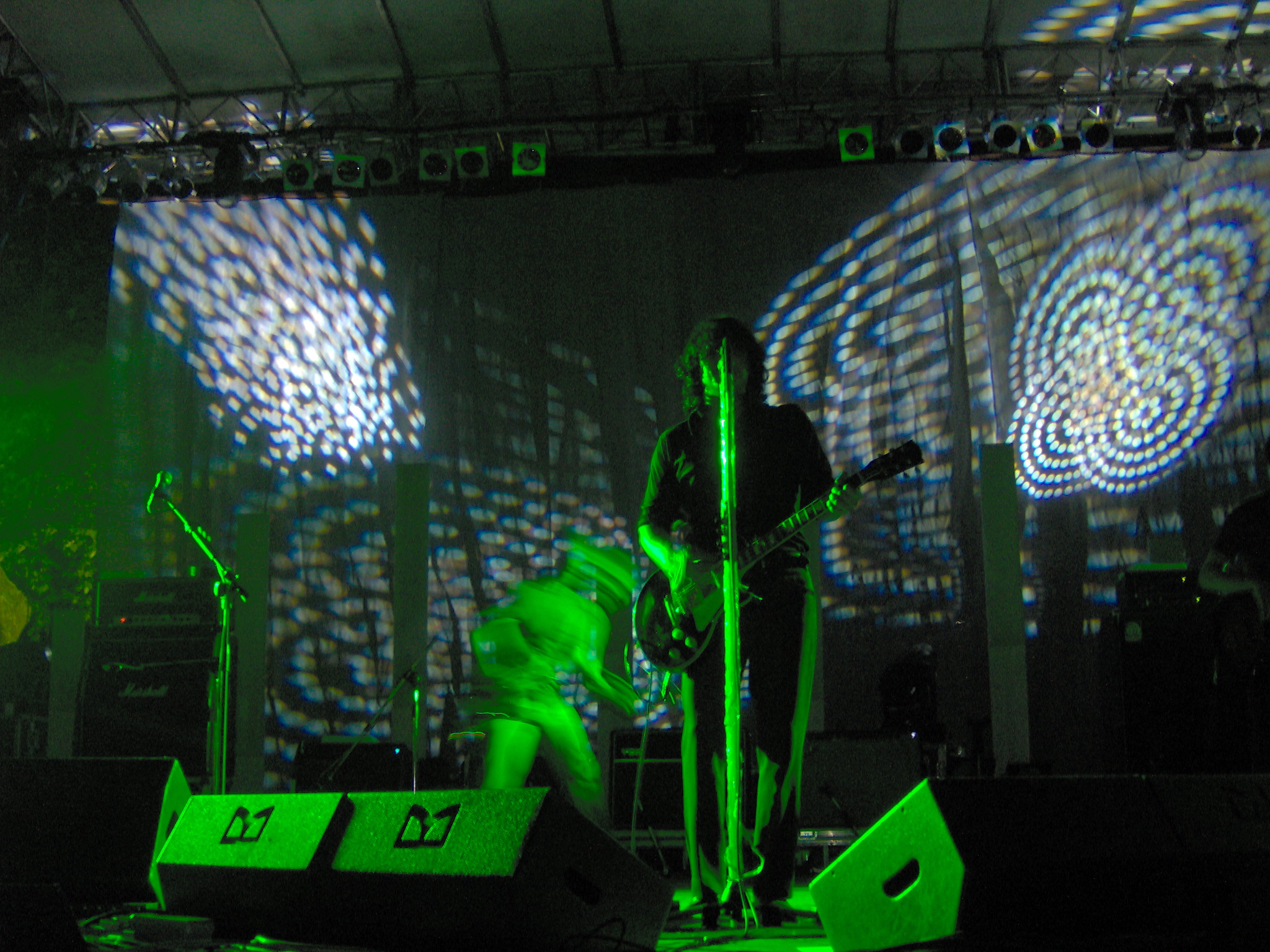

Background information
- Origin: Milan, Italy
- Genres: Alternative rock; indie rock; noise rock
- Years active: 1985–present
- Labels: Universal Records, Mescal Records, Vox Pop, Toast Records
- Members: Manuel Agnelli – vocals, guitars and keyboard; Roberto Dell'Era – bass (since 2005); Rodrigo D'Erasmo – violin (since 2008); Xabier Iriondo – guitars (1992-2001 and since 2010); Fabio Rondanini – drums (since 2014); Stefano Pilia – guitars (since 2014)
- Past members: Paolo Cantù (guitars 1990-91); Lorenzo Olgiati (bass 1990-91); Max Donna (drums 1990-1991); Alessandro Zerilli – bass (1991-1997); Davide Rossi – violin (1994-1997); Andrea Viti – bass (1997-2005); Dario Ciffo – violin – guitars (1997-2008); Enrico Gabrielli – keyboard, sax, percussion, flute, chorus, mouth organ, xylophone (2006-2009); Giorgio Prette – drums (1991-2014); Giorgio Ciccarelli – guitars, keyboard (1999 – 2014)
- Website: www.afterhours.it

Afterhours is an Italian alternative rock band. The band was named after the Velvet Underground song of the same name.

== Biography ==
The Afterhours were formed in 1985 in Milan around Manuel Agnelli, a Velvet Underground fan. They debuted in 1987 with the single My bit boy, followed a year later by the EP All Good Children Go to Hell. The band has released two albums and two EPs in English. Since Germi (1995), the group switched to Italian language, except for Ballads for Little Hyenas, produced by Afghan Whigs leader Greg Dulli, who also played with the group in a 2006 tour in the United States. Afterhours also served as the Italian backing band to Greg Dulli and Mark Lanegan’s Gutter Twins project and Agnelli co-wrote two songs with Dulli on the Twilight Singers album Powder Burns. In 2009, the band won the "Mia Martini" Critics Award at the Sanremo Music Festival. In the same year they released the compilation "Il paese è reale" ("The country is real") aiming to advance the Italian indie rock scene.

In 2014 the band released a double special edition of their most famous album Hai paura del buio?, containing a remastered version of the original album and a new disc (called Reloaded) where every song was reinterpreted by a different artist, including John Parish, Afghan Whigs, Mark Lanegan, Damo Suzuki, Nic Cester and Joan as Policewoman.

== Discography ==
=== Albums ===
- During Christine's Sleep (1990)
- Pop Kills Your Soul (1993)
- Germi (1995)
- Hai paura del buio? (1997)
- Non è per sempre (1999)
- Quello che non c'è (2002)
- Ballate per piccole iene (2005)
- Ballads for Little Hyenas (2006) with Greg Dulli
- I milanesi ammazzano il sabato (2008)
- Padania (2012)
- Folfiri o Folfox (2016)

=== Live albums ===
- 2001 – Siam tre piccoli porcellin (Mescal) 2 cd

=== Compilation albums ===
- 2008 – Cuori e demoni (EMI)
- 2016 – The Best Of (EMI)

=== EPs ===
- 1988 – All the Good Children Go to Hell (Toast Records)
- 1991 – Cocaine Head (Vox Pop)
- 2008 – Le sessioni ricreative (Universal)
- 2012 – Meet Some Freak On Route 66

=== Singles ===
- "Shadowplay"
- "Ossigeno"
- "Germi"
- "Dentro Marilyn"
- "Voglio una pelle splendida"
- "Male di miele"
- "Sui giovani d'oggi ci scatarro"
- "Non è per sempre"
- "Baby fiducia"
- "Bianca"
- "La verità che ricordavo"
- "La sinfonia dei topi"
- "Quello che non c'è"
- "Non sono immaginario"
- "Gioia e rivoluzione"
- "La vedova bianca"
- "White Widow"
- "È solo febbre"
- "Pochi istanti nella lavatrice"
- "Riprendere Berlino"
- "I Milanesi Ammazzano il Sabato"
- "Musa di nessuno"
- "Il paese è reale"
- "La Tempesta è in Arrivo"
- "Padania"
- "Spreca Una Vita"
- "Il Mio Popolo si Fa"
- "Non Voglio Ritrovare il Tuo Nome"
- "Se Io Fossi il Giudice"

=== Other ===
- 2009 – Afterhours presentano: Il paese è reale (19 artisti per un paese migliore?) (Casasonica)
- 2009 – Domani 21/04.09 (SugarMusic) Artisti Uniti Per L'Abruzzo
- 2009 – Adesso è facile performed by Mina feat. Afterhours

=== DVDs ===
- 2007 – Non Usate Precauzioni/Fatevi Infettare (1985-1997) (Virgin-EMI)
- 2007 – Io Non Tremo (1997-2006) (Virgin Records|Virgin-EMI)
- 2014 – Hai paura del buio? Il film. (Feltrinelli)

== Released cover versions of songs ==
Song, artist, Afterhours album that includes the song:

- "21st Century Schizoid Man" – King Crimson (Cocaine Head)
- "Gioia E Rivoluzione" – Area (Gioia E Rivoluzione)
- "Green River" – Creedence Clearwater Revival (All the Good Children Go to Hell)
- "Hey Bulldog" – The Beatles (Pop Kills Your Soul)
- "Jealous Guy" – John Lennon (Sui Giovani D'Oggi Ci Scatarro Su)
- "La Canzone Di Marinella" – Fabrizio De André (Gioia E Rivoluzione)
- "La Canzone Popolare" – Ivano Fossati (Gioia E Rivoluzione)
- "Mio Fratello È Figlio Unico" – Rino Gaetano (Germi)
- "On Time" – Bee Gees (Pop Kills Your Soul)
- "Shadowplay" – Joy Division (Something About Joy Division – Tribute to Joy Division)
- "State Trooper" – Bruce Springsteen (Male Di Miele)
- "The Bed" – Lou Reed (Ballads for Little Hyenas)
- "You Know You're Right" – Nirvana (I Milanesi Ammazzano Il Sabato)

== See also ==
- Italian rock
- "Green River" (in "All the Good Children Go to Hell") is a song by American rock band Creedence Clearwater Revival.
- "Shadowplay" is an acoustic remake of the Joy Division song (included in the compilation Tribute to Joy Division).
