= Effedia: Sulla mia cattiva strada =

2008 album by Fabrizio De André

Effedia - Sulla mia cattiva strada

Compilation album by Fabrizio De André
- Released: October 31, 2008
- Recorded: 1959–1998
- Genre: Folk; World
- Length: 154:43
- Language: Italian, Genoese
- Label: Sony BMG
- Producer: Dori Ghezzi with Fondazione Fabrizio De André Onlus

Fabrizio De André chronology
In direzione ostinata e contraria 2 (2005)	Effedia - Sulla mia cattiva strada (2008)

Effedia - Sulla mia cattiva strada (Full title: Effedia - Sulla mia cattiva strada: Fabrizio De André racconta Fabrizio De André) is a 2008 compilation by Italian singer/songwriter Fabrizio De André. The compilation consists of two CDs with a selection of songs recorded between 1959 and 1998, and a DVD featuring a documentary about De André's life and works.

The word "Effedia" (Italian pronunciation: [ˌɛffediˈa]) derives from the Italian pronunciation of the initials of De André's name (Fabrizio De André).

AllMusic remarked about the album in its review, "Every song is fantastic, but that is hardly a surprise or an achievement considering De André's monolithic consistency -- you could conceivable let a monkey pick the selections and the results would be equally impressive."

== CD ==
Disc one
No.	Title	Performer(s)	Length
1.	"Bella se vuoi volare" (1959, previously unreleased)		1:01
2.	"La cattiva strada" (from Vol. 8°, 1975)		4:35
3.	"La città vecchia" (from Tutto Fabrizio De André, 1966)		3:24
4.	"Dolcenera" (from Anime salve, 1996)		5:00
5.	"Le acciughe fanno il pallone" (from Anime salve, 1996)		4:47
6.	"Quello che non ho" (from Fabrizio De André, 1981)		5:52
7.	"Il gorilla" (from Vol. 3°, 1968)		3:00
8.	"Le passanti" (from Canzoni, 1974)		3:51
9.	"Amore che vieni, amore che vai" (from Tutto Fabrizio De André, 1966)		2:51
10.	"La ballata del Michè" (from Tutto Fabrizio De André, 1966)		2:55
11.	"La canzone di Marinella" (from Mi innamoravo di tutto, 1997)	Fabrizio De André and Mina	5:02
12.	"La ballata dell'eroe" (from Tutto Fabrizio De André, 1966)		2:41
13.	"La guerra di Piero" (from In concerto - arrangiamenti PFM, 1979)	De André feat. PFM	3:26
14.	"Sidún" (from Crêuza de mä, 1984)		6:25
15.	"Fiume Sand Creek" (from Fabrizio De André, 1981)		5:16
16.	"Girotondo" (from Tutti morimmo a stento, 1968)		3:08
17.	"Cielito lindo" (1993, previously unreleased)	De André feat. the Banda Osiris	1:32
18.	"Canzone del maggio" (from Storia di un impiegato, 1973)		2:25
19.	"Il testamento di Tito" (from La buona novella, 1970)		5:51
20.	"Bocca di rosa" (from Vol. 1°, 1967)		3:06
Total length:			76:07

Disc two
No.	Title	Performer(s)	Length
1.	"Maria Giuana" (1960, previously unreleased)		1:24
2.	"Via del Campo" (from Vol. 1°, 1967)		2:33
3.	"Crêuza de mä" (from Crêuza de mä, 1984)		6:41
4.	"Khorakané (A forza di essere vento)" (from In concerto, 1999)	De André and Luvi De André	5:33
5.	"Monti di Mola" (from Le nuvole, 1990)		7:47
6.	"Andrea" (from Rimini, 1978)		5:32
7.	"Rimini" (from Rimini, 1978)		4:09
8.	"Hotel Supramonte" (from Fabrizio De André, 1981)		4:33
9.	"Ho visto Nina volare" (from Anime salve, 1996)		3:58
10.	"Un malato di cuore" (from Non al denaro non all'amore né al cielo, 1971)		3:55
11.	"Don Raffaè" (previously released in Ottantavoglia di cantare, 1992)	De André and Roberto Murolo	4:22
12.	"Preghiera in gennaio" (from Vol. 1°, 1967)		3:29
13.	"Se ti tagliassero a pezzetti" (from Fabrizio De André, 1981)		5:00
14.	"La domenica delle salme" (from Le nuvole, 1990)		7:36
15.	"Ottocento" (from Le nuvole, 1990)		4:56
16.	"Amico fragile" (from Vol. 8°, 1975)		5:33
17.	"Dai monti della Savoia" (1959, previously unreleased)		1:34
Total length:			78:35

== DVD ==
Effedia - Sulla mia cattiva strada

Video by Fabrizio De André
- Released: October 31, 2008
- Genre: Folk; World
- Length: 91:42
- Label: Sony BMG
- Director: Teresa Marchesi
- Producer: Dori Ghezzi with Fondazione Fabrizio De André Onlus

The documentary features excerpts from all the songs included in the compilation, as well as interviews to De André and other people related to the artist and his music.

=== Featuring (in order of appearance) ===
- Fabrizio De André
- Georges Brassens
- Enza Sampò
- Mina
- Franco Battiato
- Mia Martini
- Zucchero
- Fernanda Pivano
- Roberto Murolo
- Luigi Tenco
- Sergio Castellitto
- Gabriele Salvatores
- Wim Wenders
- Fiorello
- Vasco Rossi
