= De André canta De André =

2009 live tribute album by Cristiano De André

- Album cover

Live album by Cristiano De André
- Released: September 2009
- Recorded: 2009
- Genre: Rock, progressive rock
- Length: 61:24
- Label: Universal Music Group
- Producer: Luciano Luisi, Cristiano De André

De André canta De André, Vol. 2
- Album cover for the second volume

Live album by Cristiano De André
- Released: September 2010
- Recorded: 2010
- Genre: Rock, progressive rock, folk
- Length: 54:56
- Label: Universal Music Group
- Producer: Luciano Luisi, Cristiano De André

De André canta De André - Cristiano De André Live ["DeA sings DeA"] is a live tribute album by Cristiano De André, consisting of updated covers and remakes of songs written (or co-written) and originally performed by his late father Fabrizio De André, recorded during Cristiano's 2009-2010 tour of Italy (originally started on the tenth anniversary of Fabrizio's passing) and released as a CD+DVD bundle. (Note: Unlike other similar releases, the two-disc, dual-format bundles of both volumes are not "special" or "deluxe editions", but the standard ones. As of 2020, they are still in print and available in the same formats.) Similarly to De André Senior's 1979-1980 release In Concerto - Arrangiamenti PFM, it was followed by a Volume 2 in 2010, recorded during the same shows and released in the same 2-disc format.

In 2017, Cristiano De André released a Vol. 3 as a follow-up to the first two releases, including twelve new covers and remakes.

== Track listing ==
=== De André canta De André ===
1. "Mégu megún" (Fabrizio De André/Ivano Fossati [lyrics]; F. De André/Mauro Pagani [music])
2. "'Â çímma" (F. De André/Fossati [lyrics]; F. De André/Pagani [music])
3. "Ho visto Nina volare" (F. De Andrè/Fossati)
4. "Se ti tagliassero a pezzetti" (F. De André/Massimo Bubola)
5. "Smisurata preghiera" (F. De André/Fossati; based on poems by Álvaro Mutis)
6. "Verranno a chiederti del nostro amore" (F. De André/Giuseppe Bentivoglio [lyrics]; F. De André/Nicola Piovani [music])
7. "Amico fragile" (F. De André)
8. "La canzone di Marinella" (F. De André)
9. "Quello che non ho" (F. De André/Bubola)
10. "Fiume Sand Creek" (F. De André/Bubola)
11. "Il pescatore" (F. De André [lyrics]; Gian Piero Reverberi/Franco Zauli [music])

All songs originally recorded and performed by Fabrizio De André.

- Tracks 1 and 2 originally released on Le nuvole
- Tracks 3 and 5 originally released on Anime salve
- Tracks 4, 9 and 10 originally released on Fabrizio De André (1981), also known as L'Indiano
- Track 6 originally released on Storia di un impiegato
- Track 7 originally released on Volume 8
- Track 8 originally released on Volume 1
- Track 11 originally released as a standalone single in 1970
- All songs arranged by Luciano Luisi, except for "Mégu megún", originally arranged by Mauro Pagani; "Ho visto Nina volare", originally arranged by Piero Milesi; "Amico fragile", "La canzone di Marinella" and "Il pescatore", originally arranged by PFM.

=== De André canta De André, Vol. 2 ===
1. "Anime salve" (F. De André/Fossati)
2. "Nella mia ora di libertà" (F. De André/Bentivoglio [lyrics], F. De André/Piovani [music])
3. "Don Raffaè" (F. De André/Bubola [lyrics]; F. De André/Pagani [music])
4. "Cose che dimentico" (F. De André/Carlo Facchini [lyrics]; C. De André [music])
5. "Â duménega" (F De Andrè [lyrics]; Pagani [music])
6. Medley: "Andrea" (F. De André/Bubola)/"La cattiva strada" (F. De André/Francesco De Gregori)/"Un giudice" (F. De André/Bentivoglio/Edgar Lee Masters [lyrics], F. De André/Piovani [music])
7. "La collina" (F. De André/Bentivoglio/Masters [lyrics], F. De André/Piovani [music]) + Reprise (F. De André/Piovani)
8. "Crêuza de mä" (F. De André [lyrics]; Pagani/F. De André [music])
9. "Bocca di Rosa" (F. De André lyrics; F. De André/Reverberi [music])
10. "La canzone dell'amore perduto" (F. De André [lyrics]; F. De André/Georg Philipp Telemann [music])

All songs originally recorded and performed by Fabrizio De André, except "Cose che dimentico", originally performed by Fabrizio and Cristiano De Andrè.

- Track 1 originally released on Anime salve
- Track 2 originally released on Storia di un impiegato
- Track 3 originally released on Le nuvole
- Track 4 originally recorded in 1998, first released in 2005 on the collection In direzione ostinata e contraria
- Tracks 5 and 8 originally released on Crêuza de mä
- Track 6: previously unreleased medley of songs originally released on Rimini (6a), Volume 8 (6b) and Non al denaro non all'amore né al cielo (6c)
- Track 7: previously unreleased medley of songs originally released on Non al denaro non all'amore né al cielo
- Track 9 originally released on Volume 1
- Track 10 originally released on Canzoni
- All songs arranged by Luciano Luisi, except "Nella mia ora di libertà" and "Â duménega", arranged by Cristiano De André & Luciano Luisi.

=== Notturno dell'Amistade DVD ===
1. "Disamistade" (F. De André/Fossati)
2. "Franziska" (F. De André/Bubola)
3. "Valzer per un amore (Valzer campestre)" (F. De André [lyrics]; Gino Marinuzzi [music])
- Track 1 originally released on Anime salve
- Track 2 originally released on Fabrizio De André (1981)
- Track 3 originally released on Canzoni
- Tracks 1 and 3 arranged by Markus Stockhausen; track 2 arranged by Malasangre.

== Overview ==
All songs were newly arranged by keyboardist, programmer and composer Luciano Luisi in a rock/hard rock style, with hints of prog rock and electronica. Described by Luisi on the documentary video Filming Around Tour, on the bonus DVD bundled with the original 2009 release, as "a cross between rock, metal, power pop and Emerson, Lake & Palmer", the new arrangements were, according to Luisi and Cristiano De André, a way to distance De André Jr.'s live performances from his father's studio and live recordings (which Luisi views as sacred and untouchable), while at the same time bringing them closer to Cristiano's own sensitivity. All songs feature a prominent electric guitar, heavily distorted and often processed, played by Osvaldo Di Dio, as well as Luisi's vintage-sounding keyboards and synths. The only exceptions are a 3-song, fully acoustic medley on the second volume, and "La canzone dell'amore perduto", (Note: During live performances, Cristiano De André dedicates "Verranno a chiederti del nostro amore" and this song to his mother - his father's first wife, Enrica "Puny" Rignon. In the Filming Around Tour documentary, Cristiano states that, although he is very fond of Dori Ghezzi as he grew up with her, he still feels a great deal of filial love toward his mother.) at the end of the same volume, performed by De André Jr. on piano, backed by a soft guitar accompaniment by Di Dio and a double bass part by Davide Pezzin. PFM's influential 1979 arrangements (originally released on Fabrizio De André in Concerto - Arrangiamenti PFM) for "Amico fragile", "La canzone di Marinella" and "Il pescatore" were reproduced almost verbatim, although Di Dio's guitar is still more prominent in the new versions than Franco Mussida's in the 1979 ones.

== Bonus DVDs ==
=== Filming Around Tour ===
Filming Around Tour (a deliberately ungrammatical portmanteau of "Filming around" and "Around (the) tour", meant as "About the tour"), is a short (37 minutes) documentary film, by filmmaker Daniele Pignatelli, about the making of the tour. It includes excerpts from behind-the-scenes interviews with Cristiano De André and the band, as well as full live performances of "'Â çimma", "Se ti tagliassero a pezzetti", "Amico fragile" and "Fiume Sand Creek".

- At the start of the film, De André Jr. describes the tour as a "passing of the baton" from his father to himself, and, at the end, he states that he always felt his father's presence on stage.
- Talking about the songs from Crêuza de mä, Le nuvole and Anime salve written in Genoese dialect, Cristiano admits that he had a hard time learning all the words and their correct pronunciations, as he had never sung in Genoese before backing his father on his 1997-1998 Anime salve tour (his final one). He also states that De André Sr. had a habit of wrongly pronouncing the German surname 'Kreutzer' (mostly referring either to classical musician Rodolphe Kreutzer or to Beethoven's Violin Sonata No. 9, popularly known as "Kreutzer Sonata" and dedicated to him) in a similar way to the Genoese word crêuza, and that the song "Crêuza de mä", which Cristiano included in the tour setlist, ended up being regularly referred to by all the band members, including himself, as "Kreutzer del mar", using the correct pronunciation of "Kreutzer" - i.e. "Kròiza".
- In an interview clip, Cristiano reveals the truth behind some of the nastiest, most cynical lines in "Amico fragile" ["Frail friend"], one of Fabrizio De André's best-known songs, and about its disconnected, stream-of-consciousness-like structure. The germ of the song was born during a summer evening which the De André family spent in their rural house in Sardinia with a group of friends; after dinner, everybody got drunk and Fabrizio was forced to sing in spite of him not wanting to. In his intoxicated state, he improvised a bawdy song (Note: The tune to which De André improvised his bawdy lyrics is unknown, but it bore no resemblance to "Amico fragile". In a scene within the 2018 biopic Fabrizio De André: Principe libero [i.e. "Free prince"], the singer, as portrayed by Luca Marinelli, sings a parody of "Il pescatore" using vulgar, scurrilous lyrics.) where he exposed all of his friends' defects and vices. After they had left, he retreated into the same garage where Cristiano is filming the interview, and wrote the whole of "Amico fragile" right away. The interview clip starts with Cristiano singing the first line of the song while performing its intricate accompaniment on acoustic guitar, displaying his prowess on the instrument; the film then cuts to his full onstage live performance of the same song, after which Cristiano talks about it.

=== Notturno dell'Amistade ===
Notturno dell'Amistade [literally "Nocturne of Friendship", from Sardinian], recorded live on 3 July 2010 at the medieval Castello Pallavicino in Varano de' Melegari, is a 3-song excerpt from a longer show performed by Cristiano De André with various guest artists as a benefit concert for Dori Ghezzi's charity organization Fondazione Fabrizio De André. The show included orchestrated and re-arranged versions of songs by Fabrizio De André, performed by all the guests.

- "Disamistade" is arranged by trumpeter and composer Markus Stockhausen and performed by the local chamber orchestra Vianiner Philarmoniker (founded by Trio Amadei, a young trio of classical players, and taking its name from Vianino, another local castle - as a deliberate parody of Wiener Philharmoniker) with the Cappella Farnesiana choir. It features a new introduction for brass and strings and an expanded orchestration for strings and choir, also including improvised flugelhorn parts by Stockhausen.
- "Franziska" features Spanish female quartet Malasangre (literally "Bad Blood", formed by sisters Maria, Marta and Pilar Robles with their cousin Pilar Crespo) and a radical flamenco-style re-arrangement by Malasangre themselves. It is played much faster than Fabrizio De André's original recording on L'Indiano, features prominent nylon-string guitars and is partly sung in Spanish. During the instrumental interludes between verses, the Robles sisters dance on their own.
- "Valzer per un amore (Valzer campestre)" features a jazz-oriented orchestral arrangement and a trumpet part by Markus Stockhausen, as well as an excerpt from Dmitri Shostakovich's popular "Waltz 2", taken from his 1956 Suite for Variety Orchestra. A very similar arrangement, including a shorter Shostakovich excerpt, was adopted for the same song by British arranger and conductor Geoff Westley, on his 2011 tribute album Sogno n° 1.

== Personnel ==
=== Musicians ===
- Cristiano De André - Acoustic guitar, 12-string guitar, violin, electric violin, piano, bouzouki, lead vocals
- Luciano Luisi - Keyboards, synthesizers, programming, backing vocals
- Osvaldo Di Dio - Electric, acoustic and classical guitars, backing vocals
- Davide Pezzin - Bass guitar, double bass
- Davide De Vito - Drums

=== Musicians on Notturno dell'Amistade ===
- Cristiano De André - Classical guitar, lead vocals
- Markus Stockhausen - Trumpet, flugelhorn
- Vianiner Philarmoniker Orchestra, conducted by Giancarlo Guarino
- Cappella Farnesiana Choir, conducted by Antonello Aleotti
- Malasangre - Classical guitars and vocals on "Franziska"

=== Production ===
- Produced by Luciano Luisi and Cristiano De André
- Arrangements - Luciano Luisi (except as noted above)
- Executive producer - Filippo Raspanti for MT Opera & Blue's
- Recorded by Giancarlo Pierozzi
- Mixed by Paolo Iafelice and Giancarlo Pierozzi at Noise Factory Studios, Milan
- Mix assistant - Davide Tessari
- Mastered by Claudio Giussani at Nautilus Studio, Milan

==== Tour production ====
- Audio and lighting suppliers - Milano Music Service
- Live production manager - Giovanni "Riccio" Colucci
- FOH engineer - Giancarlo Pierozzi
- Monitors engineer - Vincenzo "Cina" Cinone
- PA engineer - Alessandro Sbruzzi
- Lighting designer - Massimiliano Camporeale
- Stage managers - Massimo Delle Molle, Gianmaria Ofredi
- Lighting technicians - Martino Fusi, Emanuele Ciani
- Truck driver - Luca Ceschi
- Production manager - Luca Gnudi
- Director - Pepi Morgia

==== Artwork ====
- Art direction and design - Stefano "Steo" Zacchi for Showbiz Design, Bologna
- Cover photo - Desirée Sapia
- Additional photos - Guido Harari, Patrizia Andreozzi, Valeria Fioranti, Marta Mandelli, Marco Tomacelli
- Tour poster design on CD back cover - Guido Harari
- Wardrobe - Costume Nacional

=== Filming Around Tour ===
- A film by Daniele Pignatelli
- Camera - Giovanni Bonatelli, Francesca Gasperini, Ronald Gomez, Massimiliano Navarra, Federico Salsano, Simone Serra, Daniele Pignatelli
- Cinematographer - Daniele Pignatelli
- Post-production - Art3fatti
- Audio mixing - Sing Sing Studio
- Produced by Marco Mandelli and Daniele Pignatelli
- Executive producer - Marco Mandelli
- Editor and director - Daniele Pignatelli
- With the contribution of Mortaroli & Friends
- Special thanks to all the musicians, the sound engineers, the tour technicians for their kindness, producers Michele Torpedine and Bruno Sconocchia, Pepi Morgia, Luvi De André, Dori Ghezzi, Fabrizio De André Foundation... and of course to Cristiano and Fabrizio De André.

=== Notturno dell'Amistade ===
- Produced by Cristiano De André
- Recorded live and mixed by Giancarlo Pierozzi
- Executive producer - Filippo Raspanti for MT Opera & Blue's
- Production company - Run Multimedia s.r.l., Lucrezia De Moli
- Film editing - Enrico Tomei
- Special thanks to Fabrizio De André Foundation for the video images
