= Una storia sbagliata (song) =

- Cover art for the single

Single by Fabrizio De André
- B-side: "Titti"
- Released: 1980
- Recorded: 1980
- Genre: Folk rock, singer-songwriter
- Length: 5:28
- Label: Dischi Ricordi
- Songwriters: Fabrizio De André, Massimo Bubola
- Producers: Mark Harris, Oscar Prudente

Una storia sbagliata is a song written and recorded by Italian singer-songwriter Fabrizio De André and co-composed with folk songwriter Massimo Bubola. It was initially released as a single backed with "Titti". Both songs were recorded during the initial sessions for De André's self-titled 1981 album (also known as L'Indiano) and first released in 1980 as a standalone single. In 1999, "Una storia sbagliata" was re-released within the Fabrizio De André: Opere complete box set. "Titti" had its first CD release in 2005, within the greatest hits and rarities collection In direzione ostinata e contraria.

== Track listing ==
1. "Una storia sbagliata" ["A wrong story"] (Fabrizio De André/Massimo Bubola) – 5:28
2. "Titti" (Bubola/De André) – 4:47

== Songs ==
=== "Una storia sbagliata" ===
"Una storia sbagliata" (literally "A wrong story", but also translatable as "A story in error" or "A story full of mistakes") is an impassioned folk rock song in 6/8 time, set at a lento (= slow) tempo of about 57 BPM (in tuplets). It features an arrangement led by layered acoustic and electric strummed guitars, and mostly sung in close harmony by De André and co-writer Bubola. Written on a commission from RAI as an end-credits song for the 1980 documentary Dietro il processo ("Behind the trial") by journalist Franco Biancacci, it is a topical song about the mysterious, unsolved 1975 murder of writer, poet and film director Pier Paolo Pasolini. (Ennio Morricone wrote original music for the documentary.) The lyrics do not specifically talk about the event but refer to it as a forgettable, untold, complex, peripheral, unfinished, black-coloured, badly covered-up, disgraced, and, ultimately, wrong story. All of the above adjectives, and more, are used in the verses of the song. Each is used in a single anaphoric line as a modifier of "story", while the chorus refers to the story itself as either different for ordinary people or as an ordinary one for special people. In the second chorus, "story" is replaced by "night", and the choruses mention two lives tainted, hit and sculpted by heaven. According to an interview with Bubola in the final DVD (Poesia in forma di canzone – "Poetry as songs") of the 8-DVD 2011 documentary series Dentro Faber (De André's nickname) about his life and works, he and De André accurately chose the word "Heaven", instead of "God", in order not to wrap a religious vision into the song, per De André's wishes. Bubola also explained the "two lives" line as a reference to the fact that the original RAI documentary (for which the song was written) was also about the unsolved murder of 21-year-old aspiring actress Wilma Montesi.

=== "Titti" ===
"Titti" [a nickname for the female names Tiziana or Elisabetta] is a happy-sounding Tejano song, set in 4/4 time at an allegro moderato tempo of about 120 BPM and again featuring acoustic strummed guitars (similarly to "Andrea", from Rimini, but harsher and less melodic than its predecessor). The lyrics are mostly whimsical and, except for the chorus, do not tell a consistent story. Indeed, the titular Titti appears only in the chorus, which was inspired by Jorge Amado's 1966 fantasy novel Dona Flor and Her Two Husbands. In a lightweight tone, De André sings about a carefree woman named Titti who "had two loves, one of heaven, one of earth; of opposite sign, one of peace, one of war" and, in the second half of the chorus, "one on earth, one in heaven, [...] a good one, a true one". The verses, on the other hand, consist in a series of unconnected images about pairs (or couples) of objects and people, each pair/couple being linked only by a common object or a common place. Two such lines, "And it was two wooden beams which made up the cross/and, around it, two bandits with the same voice", may be read as a biblical reference to the two thieves crucified alongside Jesus, but also as an allusion to De Andre's notorious 1979 kidnapping by Anonima sarda, as the bandits who talked to him were actually two, and undistinguishable. The song is one of De André's least-known: he considered it very irrelevant and has never promoted it, nor has he commented on it. Co-writer Bubola, however, on Dentro Faber, mentioned it en passant as "just a B-side", and explained that the name "Titti" was preferred to his original choice of "Flora" – from the title of Amado's novel – as "Titti" had a more percussive sound (thus fitting better into the music of the song and its chorus), without caring at all about any possible significance of either name.

== Personnel ==
According to Bubola, both sides of the single feature unspecified members of Premiata Forneria Marconi and New Trolls, in what the songwriter referred to as "a sort of jam session". Later on, during a TV interview to promote New Trolls' 2013 album Concerto Grosso N° 3, where the then-current band was billed as La Leggenda New Trolls due to an ongoing lawsuit involving former guitarist Ricky Belloni, founding member Vittorio De Scalzi (a longtime friend of De André's, who frequently includes songs by his fellow Genoan musician into his own stage act), tentatively remembered the line-up for "Una storia sbagliata" as being made up of himself on piano and keyboards, with PFM's Franz Di Cioccio on drums, Patrick Djivas on bass, and Franco Mussida on guitar. Belloni and Bubola also played guitars and the latter sang a higher-third harmony to De André. De Scalzi also stated that the backing track for the song was indeed cut live.
