= Genoese School =

1960s cultural and artistical movement originating in Genoa, Italy

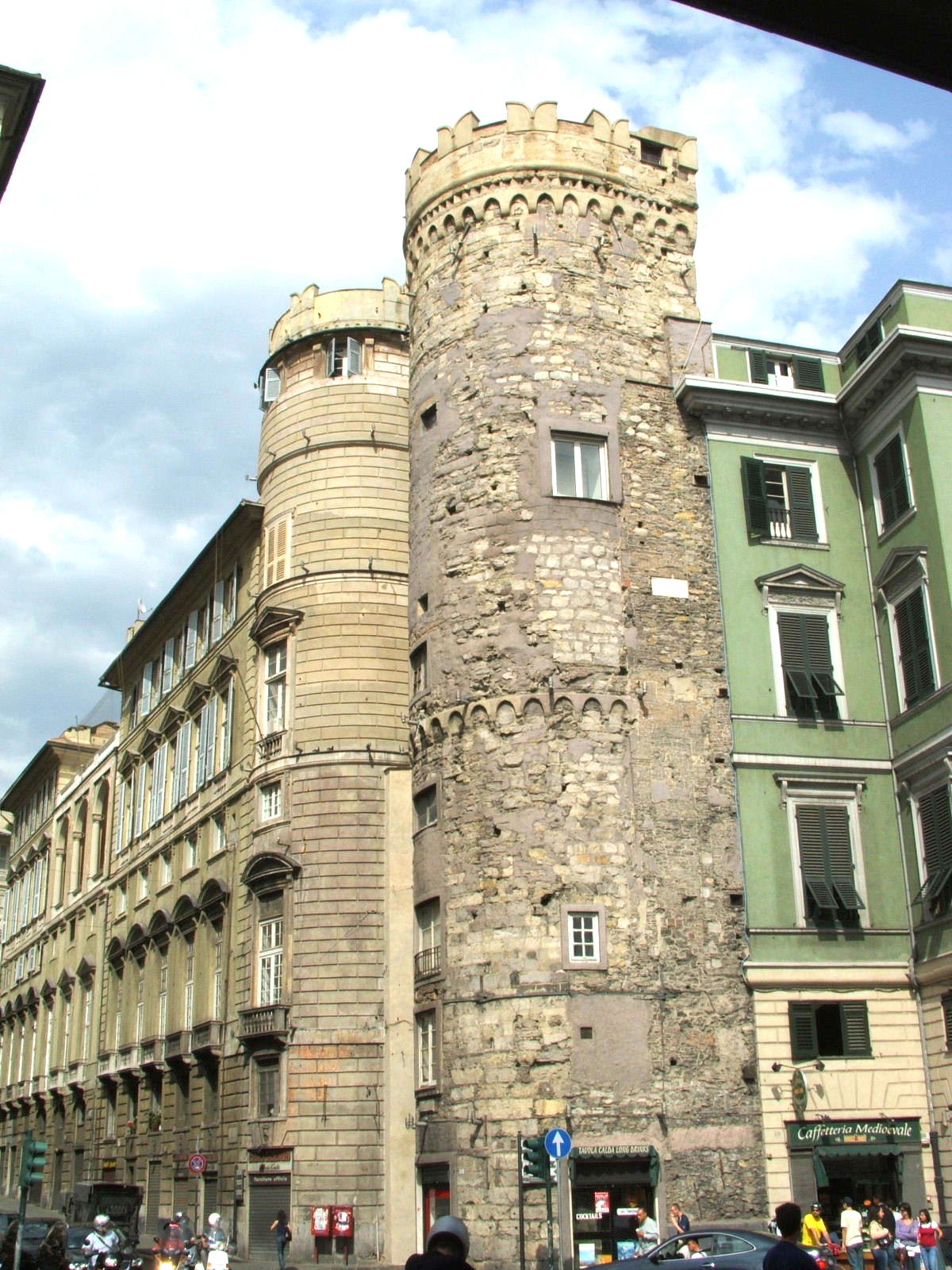
The entrance to Via del Campo, in Genoa, sung by Fabrizio De André, a preeminent exponent of the School.

The Genoese School (Italian: Scuola genovese) is a cultural and art movement developed and rooted, since the 1960s, in Genoa, Italy. It is mainly linked to the Italian canzone d'autore ("art song" or "song with [a renowned] author").

== History ==
Among the major representatives of the "classical school" of the 1960s are: Umberto Bindi, Fabrizio De André, Bruno Lauzi, Gino Paoli, Giorgio Calabrese and Luigi Tenco. An important role was played also by the brothers Gian Franco and Gian Piero Reverberi, musicians and arrangers from Genoa who promoted many of the cantautori (singer-songwriters) of the first generation, allowing them to work in Milan. All of them were musically and artistically grown in Genoa, the city where they were born or had moved to as children. In the 1960s they often met in the Foce neighborhood of Genoa and in particular at the Igea bar (which was a source of inspiration to Gino Paoli for his song "Quattro amici" in 1991), in Via Casaregis at the corner with Via Cecchi (later renamed as Roby Bar and today named Mini Mixing Bar).

=== Cultural influence ===
This movement determined «a deep break with the traditional Italian music», in primis for a renewed artistic means, more refined and eclectic, and then for a diverse use of the language, more realist. Thus, facing a huge variety of themes, from sentiments, to existential experiences, to politics, to ideology, to war and themes as the social exclusion, with strong individualistic accent and close to the tones of the French existentialism. Cultural influences of the Genoese School are different, from the Italian and Ligurean literary and musical tradition (Camillo Sbarbaro, Cesare Pavese, Giorgio Caproni, Riccardo Mannerini), from the French and English literature of the begin of 20th century (Jean-Paul Sartre, Raymond Queneau), from the anarchic philosophy (in particular Tenco, De André and Paoli) and the liberal one (Lauzi), from the French music of Charles Aznavour, Jacques Brel and Georges Brassens from the US-folk of Bob Dylan. Amongst the literary exponents from Beat Generation: Allen Ginsberg, Jack Kerouac, William Burroughs e Gregory Corso. In particular, both Lauzi and De André dedicated part of their production to their cities, adopting also the Ligurian language in more songs; examples are the songs "Genova per noi" (performed by Bruno Lauzi, but written by the Piedmontese songwriter Paolo Conte, 1975) and "Crêuza de mä" (Fabrizio De André, 1984). The sea of Liguria is a recurrent topic for all the cantautori of the Genoese School.

=== The Genoese School gets larger ===
Initially defined to name the first members only, this locution become larger including more and more members over time. Members of the first generation include Vittorio De Scalzi (singer-songwriter and co-author of Fabrizio de André), the New Trolls, the Ricchi e Poveri and Matia Bazar. Then, members of new generations, as Ivano Fossati and Francesco Baccini, are followed by Max Manfredi, Federico Sirianni, Cristiano De André and others. Linked to this cultural environment are also authors as Fernanda Pivano, who translated into Italian the Spoon River Anthology, book on which De André based his album Non al denaro non all'amore né al cielo, and the actor Paolo Villaggio, close friend of De André and coauthor for a couple of song of him ("Carlo Martello ritorna dalla battaglia di Poitiers" and "Il fannullone").

== Via del Campo 29 rosso ==
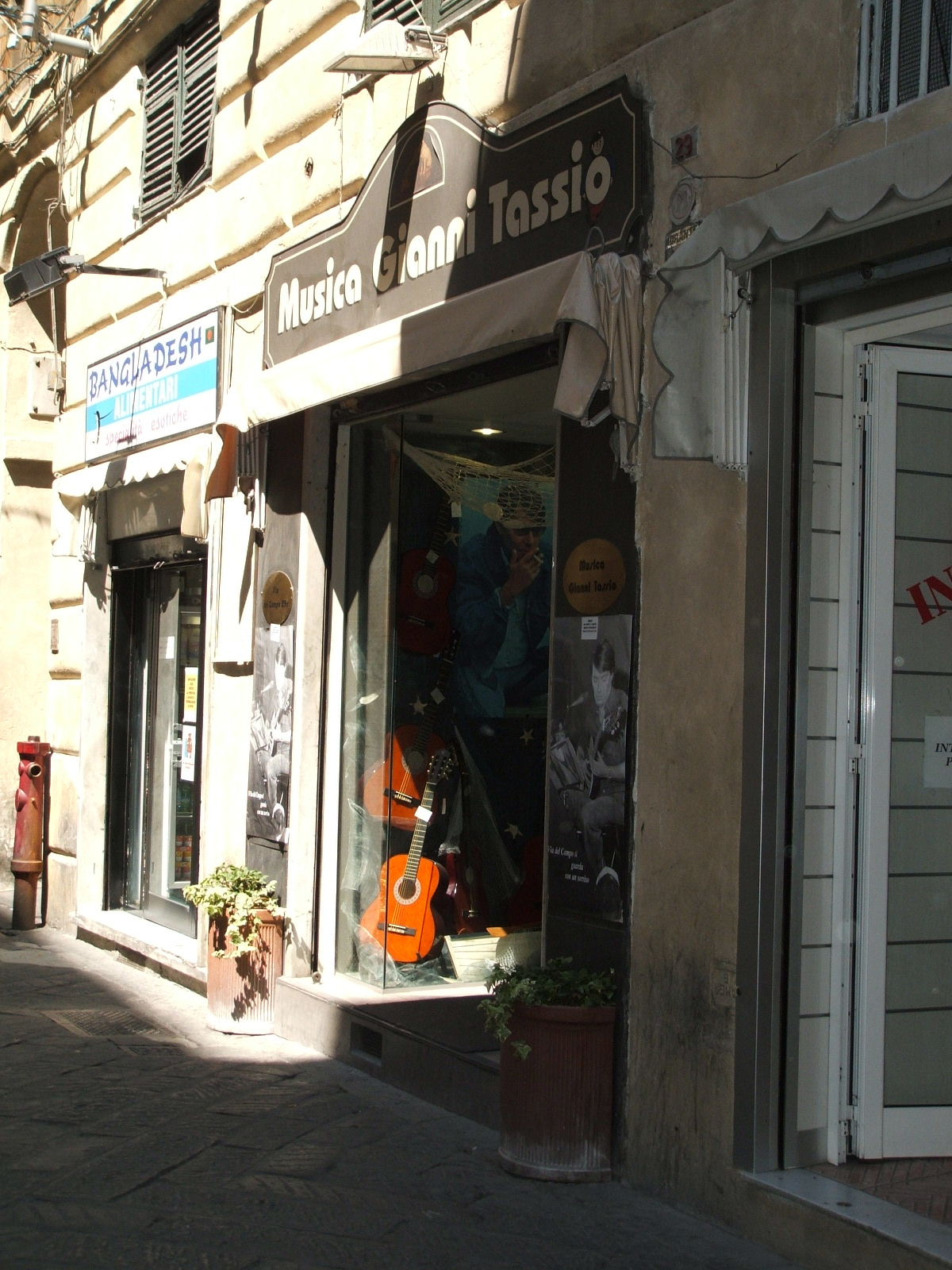
The entrance of the Tassio's music shop

In a music shop is arranged an exhibition about the Genoese School, named "Via del Campo 29 rosso". The owner, Gianni Tassio, was a friend of De André. The shop is located in Via del Campo, a typical road in the medieval center of Genoa to whom De André dedicated a song. In 2010, the city of Genoa acquired the shop and turned it into a permanent exhibition dedicated to De André and the Genoese School.

== Bibliography ==
- Fabrizio Càlzia, De André e dintorni: Genova e i cantautori - La Guida. (2017). Italy: Galata Edizioni.
- Cinzia Comandé (2014). Genova per noi. Roma: Arcana. ISBN 978-88-6231-354-4.
- Sebastiano Ferrari (2008). La prima generazione dei cantautori "scuola genovese". Foggia: Bastogi. ISBN 978-88-6273-112-6.
- Giangilberto Monti (2004). Dizionario dei cantautori. Milano: Garzanti. ISBN 88-11-74035-5.
- Marzio Angiolani (2011). Genova. Storie di canzoni e cantautori. Genova: Editrice Zona. ISBN 978-88-6438-237-1.

== Other projects ==
- Wikiquote contiene citazioni sulla scuola genovese
