= Andrea Parodi (Cantù) =

Italian singer (born 1975)

Andrea Parodi is an Italian singer from Cantù.

His musical style has been seen as combining the Italian songwriting tradition, such as Fabrizio De André and Francesco De Gregori, with the American, including Bob Dylan, Bruce Springsteen, Tom Petty, Townes Van Zandt, and John Prine.

He has released three albums. The first two, Le Piscine di Fecchio and Soldati, were recorded in Canada with the Bocephus King Band. The third album, Chupadero, by the Barnetti Bros Band (Andrea Parodi, Massimo Bubola, Max Larocca and Jono Manson) is a concept album focused on the theme of the romantic bandit with songs in Italian and English. Chupadero was voted by Buscadero magazine readers as the best Italian album of the year.

== Discography ==
=== Album ===
- 2002: Le piscine di Fecchio (Venus / IRD)
- 2007: Soldati (Venus / Lifegate Music)
- 2009: Chupadero! (Universal / Eccher Music), with the Barnetti Bros Band

=== Participant ===
- 2003: Mille papaveri rossi (Stella nera), on the song Suzanne
- 2007: Duemila papaveri rossi (Stella nera), on the song Avventura a Durango
