= Ed avevamo gli occhi troppo belli =

Live album by Fabrizio De André
- Released: 2001
- Recorded: 1991–1997
- Genre: Folk
- Length: 17:40

Fabrizio De André chronology
In concerto (1999)	Ed avevamo gli occhi troppo belli (2001)	In concerto volume II (2001)

Ed avevamo gli occhi troppo belli (And We Had Too Beautiful Eyes) is live album by Italian singer-songwriter Fabrizio De André. It was released in 2001 by A/Rivista Anarchica, an Italian anarchist magazine of which De André was a reader and supporter. It mainly consists of recordings of short speeches, which the singer used to make during his concerts.

== Track listing ==
No.	Title	Length
1.	"Elogio della solitudine"	2:30
2.	"Prinçesa e i Rom"	3:32
3.	"Al fianco degli Indiani"	2:23
4.	"Se ti tagliassero a pezzetti" (Recorded at Arena Civica, Milan, September 16, 1991)	4:21
5.	"Ai figli della luna"	0:49
6.	"Le maggioranze"	1:49
7.	"Un discorso sulla libertà"	1:09
8.	"I Carbonari" (Recorded at Palasport Evangelisti, Perugia, April 12, 1997)	1:13

== Track details ==
- "Elogio della Solitudine": De André talks about how solitude can sometimes allow people to better analyze life problems and get in contact with everything that surrounds them.
- "Prinçesa e i Rom": a speech about how solitude can also derive from being considered "different" by others. Examples of "different" people are the transsexual Prinçesa, the main character of one of De André's songs, and the Romani people.
- "Al fianco degli indiani": as an introduction to the song "Fiume Sand Creek", the speech revolves around the sufferings of Native Americans since Christopher Columbus' arrival in 1492.
- "Se ti tagliassero a pezzetti" is a song contained in De André's 1981 eponymous album.
- "Ai figli della luna": a speech about homosexuals. The title refers to how Plato defined homosexuals.
- "Le maggioranze": introduction to the song "Smisurata preghiera" where De André talks about how majorities too often rely on their number to oppress minorities.
- "Un discorso sulla libertà": the singer ultimately defines his last album (Anime salve) to be not just about ostracized minorities, but "a speech about freedom".
- "I Carbonari" is De André's rendition of the song used in the 1969 Italian movie Nell'anno del Signore, directed by Luigi Magni.
