= Un destino ridicolo =

1996 novel by Fabrizio De André and Alessandro Gennari

- First edition (Italian)
- Author: Fabrizio De André; Alessandro Gennari
- Language: Italian
- Series: Coralli, #58
- Genre: Novel
- Publisher: Einaudi
- Publication date: 1996
- Publication place: Italy
- Media type: Print (Hardcover, Paperback)
- ISBN: 88-06-17591-2
- OCLC: 36308462

Un destino ridicolo (A ridiculous destiny) is a 1996 novel written by the Italian singer-songwriter Fabrizio De André together with the writer Alessandro Gennari. The 2008 film Amore che vieni, amore che vai, directed by Daniele Costantini, is based on that novel.

== Plot ==
The novel is set between Sardinia and the city of Genoa. The Sardinian shepherd Salvatore, after a detention in prison, comes to Genoa in search of a better life. In the old town he meets a prostitute, Veretta, and falls in love with her. The main plot is weaved with the histories of the pimp Carlo, the French criminal Barnard, the young singer-songwriter Fabrizio and his fan Alessandro, the beautiful "new girl in town" Maritza and Salvatore's cousin, Annino. In particular, the main section of the novel focuses on Carlo and Salvatore being involved in a heist on account of Barnard; Salvatore ends up being shot by a hired hitman of Barnard's, when the former confesses everything to the latter after stumbling upon him and wrongly believing him to be a priest.

The character of Maritza is a novelization of Bocca di Rosa, the main character of a De André hit song. Two other characters (Fabrizio and Alessandro) are the authors themselves.

== See also ==
- 1996 in literature
