= Amore che vieni, amore che vai =

- Directed by: Daniele Costantini
- Written by: Daniele Costantini; Franco Ferrini; Antonio Leotti
- Produced by: Gabriella Buontempo; Massimo Martino
- Starring: Fausto Paravidino; Filippo Nigro; Massimo Popolizio; Donatella Finocchiaro; Tosca D'Aquino; Claudia Zanella; Agostina Belli
- Cinematography: Alessio Gelsini Torresi
- Music by: Nicola Piovani
- Distributed by: Istituto Luce
- Release date: 2008
- Country: Italy
- Language: Italian

Amore che vieni, amore che vai is a 2008 Italian crime drama film directed by Daniele Costantini. It is based on the novel Un destino ridicolo by Fabrizio De André and Alessandro Gennari.

== Plot ==
In 1963 Genoa, bartender Carlo is fired for having saved prostitute Luciana from her pimp's violent behaviour. Following that, the girl makes a proposal to Carlo to be a pimp to her and two colleagues of hers. Carlo asks approval to his mother Lina to perform this new job of his, and he obtains it after some initial hostility from her.

At the same time Carlo falls in love with Maritza, a new girl in town (freely based on Bocca di Rosa, the protagonist of De André's eponymous song from 1967).

Elsewhere, Salvatore, a shepherd from Sardinia who has just been released from prison, also falls in love with Veretta, one of Carlo's girls. The pair find themselves involved in a big heist on account of local criminal boss Bernard.

The next day, after having intercepted and skillfully stolen a smuggled truckload of money by masquerading as Carabinieri, Carlo and Bernard stumble upon Salvatore's corpse and realize that the smuggled funds have been stolen from them.

In the meantime, Carlo, not being able to locate Maritza any longer, goes out of his mind and starts suspecting everybody of having kidnapped her.

In a surprise plot twist, it is revealed that the money was stolen by Salvatore, who also took the chance to kill his twin brother - because of whom he had unjustly been jailed for five years.

However, while escaping on a train, Salvatore has a change of heart and confesses his theft and his murder to a man whom he erroneously believes to be a priest, but who is actually a hitman working for Bernard. Salvatore is "absolved" by the fake priest and gives him all of the money he stole. Soon afterwards, the man shoots him and dumps his corpse from a train window.

== Cast ==
- Fausto Paravidino as Carlo
- Filippo Nigro as Salvatore
- Massimo Popolizio as Bernard
- Donatella Finocchiaro as Veretta
- Tosca D'Aquino as Luciana
- Claudia Zanella as Maritza
- Agostina Belli as Lina
- Giorgia Ferrero as Antonia
- Davide Paganini as Vichingo

== See also ==
- List of Italian films of 2008
