= La guerra di Piero =

1968 song of Fabrizio De André

"La guerra di Piero" ("The war of Piero") is a song by Fabrizio De André included in the album Volume III (1968). The music was composed by Vittorio Centanaro.

== Inspiration and history ==
With "La guerra di Piero" De André speaks again about war, after "La ballata dell'eroe". De André's reference for the style was Georges Brassens, but here the inspiration come from his uncle, Francesco Amerio. The remembrance of his return from the concentration camps, his story, the rest of his life adrift, deeply impressed De André, who remembered him many times.

In De Andrè's lyrics are present many echoes from other poems. Amongst all, emerges "Le Dormeur du val", a poem by Arthur Rimbaud (Cahier de Douai, 1870), which was taken up by many artists, e.g. Léo Ferré who sang it in 1955.

A quatrain reminds the poem "Dove vola l'avvoltoio?" written by Italo Calvino in 1958 and put in music by Sergio Liberovici.

== Bibliography ==
- Corsi, Claudio; Ivaldi, Federica (2011). Fabrizio De André. Cantastorie fra parole e musica (in Italian). Roma.
