= Canzoni (Fabrizio De André album) =

Studio album by Fabrizio De André
- Released: 1974
- Recorded: 1974
- Genre: Folk, rock
- Length: 35:34
- Label: Produttori Associati; Ricordi; BMG
- Producer: Roberto Dané; Sergio Bardotti

Fabrizio De André chronology
| Storia di un impiegato (1973) | Canzoni (1974) | Volume 8 (1975) |

Professional ratings
Review scores
| Source | Rating |
|---|---|
| Allmusic | 4/5 stars |

Canzoni is the seventh album released by Fabrizio De André. It was issued in 1974 by Produttori Associati and reissued several times by Ricordi and BMG.

Uniquely for a De André release, eight of the album's eleven tracks are covers or translations, including the opening track "Via della Povertà", a cover of Bob Dylan's "Desolation Row". The final track, "Valzer per un amore" ["Waltz for a love"], is De Andre's vocal version of an instrumental waltz by composer Gino Marinuzzi, entitled "Valzer campestre" ["Country Waltz"]. According to De André's recollections, a 78-rpm record of the song was playing in his mother's house as he was being born. The other three tracks are re-recording of early compositions which De André originally recorded in the early Sixties, when he was signed to Karim. The album's peculiar structure is mainly the result of De Andre's record label at the time wanting to release a "filler" album, in the same vein as his 1968 collection Volume 3.

== Track listing ==
All tracks written by Fabrizio De André, except where noted.

Side A

1. Via della Povertà [Desolation Row] (Bob Dylan, translated by De André and Francesco De Gregori) - 9:37
2. Le passanti [Les passantes] (Music by Jean Bertola, lyrics by Antoine Pol, translated by De André) - 3:51
3. Fila la lana [File la laine] - (Robert Marcy, translated and adapted by De André) - 2:40
4. La ballata dell'amore cieco (o della vanità) - 3:05
5. Suzanne (Leonard Cohen, translation by De André) - 3:26

Side B

1. Morire per delle idee [Mourir pour des idées] - (Georges Brassens, translated by De André) 4:26
2. La canzone dell'amore perduto - 3:21 (music by Georg Philipp Telemann; musical adaption and lyrics by De André)
3. La città vecchia - 3:23
4. Giovanna d'Arco [Joan of Arc] (Leonard Cohen, translated by De André) - 4:50
5. Delitto di paese [L'assassinat] (Brassens, translated by De André) - 3:55
6. Valzer per un amore (music by Gino Marinuzzi, lyrics by De André) - 3:37

== The songs ==
=== "Via della Povertà" ===
Lyrically co-written by De André with his colleague and friend Francesco De Gregori at the very start of a collaboration which will produce the bulk of De André's next album Volume 8, "Via della Povertà" [literally "Poverty Way"] is a faithful translation (both on a textual and a musical level) of Bob Dylan's lengthy 1965 folk rock ballad "Desolation Row", originally featured on Dylan's Highway 61 Revisited. It is a complex and meticulous examination of various people in various states of impoverishment (also including several fictional characters) by an omniscient, external narrator. In the last verse, the narrator speaks directly to another person, stating that the whole content of the song is part of a letter he received from that person, and reminding them that the people described up to then are neither monsters nor heroes, but ordinary people. The final lines reveal the sender of the letter as someone who also lives on "Poverty Way".

==== Alternate lyrics ====
In 1975, during his earliest live performances of "Via della Povertà", De André occasionally took advantage of the song's repetitive structure to replace three verses in the song (the fourth-to-last, third-to-last and second-to-last ones) with new verses, written by himself, focusing on political satire and completely unrelated to Dylan's lyrics or to the translation. One such performance, from 28 November 1975 in Brescia Palasport, is featured as a hidden track at the end of the second CD from the 2012 box set I concerti ["The concerts"], a full compendium of De André's live activity. In this performance, the new verses target Giorgio Almirante, Gianni Agnelli, Indro Montanelli (initially called "Montagnelli", then with his correct surname), Enrico Berlinguer and Pope Paul VI.

=== "Le passanti" ===
"Le passanti" ["The passers-by"], a translation of a Georges Brassens original from 1962 (based on a 1918 poem by French symbolist poet Antoine Pol), is dedicated by the singer "to every woman thought of as a lover", and, consequently, to all women. He goes on to describe some of them, living unremarkable lives, and melancholically concludes that he will find solace from his moments of solitude through his memories of "all the beautiful passers-by [I] didn't manage to hold on to".

=== "Fila la lana" ===
"Fila la lana" ["Spin the wool"], although superficially presented as a traditional ballad from the Middle Ages, is actually a 1948 composition by French songwriter Robert Marcy. It is about knights and warriors returning from a war, except for a Seignor who was killed and left his woman behind. In the chorus, she is described as endlessly spinning her wool, waiting for a homecoming which will never happen.

=== "La ballata dell'amore cieco (o della vanità)" ===
"La ballata dell'amore cieco (o della vanità)" ["The ballad of blind love (or, of vanity)"] includes one of De André's darkest lyrics ever, freely based on a poem by Jean Richepin. It tells the story of an honest man who falls madly in love with a vain woman "who didn't love him at all". She urges him to bring her his mother's heart "to feed [her] dogs"; he duly complies by killing his mother and gruesomely ripping out her heart. Afterwards, the woman asks the man to slash the four veins in his wrists, effectively killing himself. Hypnotized by a mindless love, he does just that. At the end of the song, the woman is upset when she sees him dying happily and still in love, while realizing that she obtained nothing at all from him: neither love, nor affection, "but just the dried blood from his veins." The extremely dark, macabre mood of the lyrics is offset by the music, based on a jaunty Dixieland arrangement, which turns the entire piece into a musical tragicomedy.

=== "Suzanne" ===
"Suzanne", De André's translation of a 1966 song by Leonard Cohen, originally written as a poem and later released on Cohen's Songs of Leonard Cohen album, is about a love affair between a young man and a travelling (possibly seafaring) woman. The song also includes a passing mention of Jesus, described as a sailor who speaks to drowned people (a metaphorical reference to Jesus's walking on water miracle); the couple imagines Jesus watching them "from his wooden tower" and blessing them.

=== "Morire per delle idee" ===
"Morire per delle idee" ["Dying for ideals"], another song translated by De André from a Brassens original, is a satirical, skeptical song about the so-called "martyrs for ideals" (either political or religious ones), which De André has frequently met during his lifetime. He bitingly remarks that dying for ideals "okay, but dying a slow death" is useless, because all ideals are short-lived and meant not to be remembered at all by the posterity.

=== "La canzone dell'amore perduto" ===
"La canzone dell'amore perduto" ["The song of lost love"] features a sweet, nostalgia-laden arrangement based on a flugelhorn melody (actually written by Georg Philipp Telemann, although the German composer was left uncredited) over an orchestral backing, and a subdued lyric exploring a recurring theme of De André's: his denial of the romantic notion that love is eternal. Indeed, he compares a love affair to withering flowers, stating that even the strongest and most passionate love relationship is going to die just like flowers; the person that the song is addressed to, though, is also described as very likely to restart everything as soon as they meet someone new. The song was covered by Franco Battiato on his 1999 album Fleurs, with a simplified arrangement based exclusively on strings.

=== "La città vecchia" ===
"La città vecchia" ["The old (side of the) city"], a mazurka originally recorded by De André in 1965 for Karim, is set in the old part of Genoa, where he spent his teenage years, and depicts its narrow alleyways - traditionally home to prostitutes, drunkards, criminals and other marginalized people. Taking the first two lines almost directly from a poem by Jacques Prévert ("The sun of the good Lord doesn't shine on our parts/It already has too much to do in the rich quarters"), the singer mentions a relationship between an "old professor" and a prostitute, stating that he is going to waste most of his hard-earned pension on her; he also warns him not to look down on her and the other people in the "old town", as they, in spite of how low and filthy their moral status may be, are all "children [and] victims of this world." The original 1965 recording of this song was yet again a victim of the strict Italian censorship at the time; indeed, in the lyrics as originally recorded, the old professor mentioned in the second part of the song is quoted as describing by day the prostitute he is in love with as a "kind of slut" (specie di troia in Italian), while by night "she puts a price tag on [his] joy" (di notte stabilisce un prezzo alla tua gioia). These lines, in a hastily re-made new recording, were changed with pubblica moglie ("public wife") and ...alle tue voglie ("...on your desires").

=== "Giovanna d'Arco" ===
"Giovanna d'Arco" ("Joan of Arc"), De André's adaption of a Cohen original from 1971, depicts the legendary French heroine while she burns at the stake; she talks to the fire and lets herself be consumed by it, as she is "tired of the war" and longing to wear "a wedding dress, or something white" (a reference to the fact that she was always dressed as a man). Each of the four verses in the song ends with a "la-la-la" refrain.

=== "Delitto di paese" ===
"Delitto di paese" ["Village crime"], the third and last Brassens adaption within this album, is a neutral account (almost in the style of a crime story in a paper) of a murder occurring in a small town: an aged man falls in love with a much younger girl, but she and an accomplice of hers murder him after finding out that he is "flat broke". They also search the victim's apartment, looking for money, but they find nothing else than "bills and court judgements." At the end, the narrator loses his detachment to describe the perpetrators earning a place in Heaven by crying over the dead body; upon being sentenced to death and hanged, they do ascend to Heaven - much to the chagrin of "some bigots".

=== "Valzer per un amore" ===
"Valzer per un amore", De André's vocal remake of "Valzer campestre" (a very traditional waltz from 1909 by Gino Marinuzzi), originally recorded in 1964 for Karim, features yet another melancholy-imbued lyric about the fickleness of love: the singer says that all manifestations of love from a man to a woman, such as hugs, kisses, caresses and (pointedly) love songs, will mean nothing and will end up as completely forgettable (and forgotten) when she will be very old and he will have been dead for a long time. De André's lyrical approach on this song was influenced by a 16th-century sonnet by Pierre de Ronsard (also freely translated by William Butler Yeats in 1893), entitled Quand vous serez bien vieille ["When you are very old"]. The sonnet's first verse is as follows:

"When you are very old, in the evening, by candlelight,
Sitting by the fire, winding and spinning,
You will say, singing my verses, marveling:
Ronsard celebrated me in the time when I was beautiful."
