= Il pescatore =

- Cover art for the single

Single by Fabrizio De André
- B-side: "Marcia nuziale"
- Released: 1970
- Recorded: 1970
- Genre: Folk; cantautorato
- Length: 2:19
- Label: Liberty Records (Italy)
- Composers: Gian Piero Reverberi; Franco Zauli
- Lyricist: Fabrizio De André
- Producer: Roberto Dané

Fabrizio De André singles chronology
"Leggenda di Natale" (1969)	"Il pescatore" (1970)	"La stagione del tuo amore" (1970)

"Il pescatore" ("The Fisherman") is a song by Fabrizio De André, with lyrics by himself and music by composers Gian Piero Reverberi and Franco Zauli. Backed with "Marcia nuziale", De André's translation of Georges Brassens' 1957 song "La Marche nuptiale", it was released in 1970 by the Italian branch of Liberty Records as a standalone single, De André's first of only two such releases in his career. It was De André's first single to enter the Italian singles chart, peaking at the 13th position. Its popularity was significantly boosted by a 1979 live remake, with PFM backing De André in a new rock arrangement.

== The song ==
One of De André's narrative songs, typical of his early production, "Il pescatore" is about an elderly fisherman, whose peaceful slumber on the shore is interrupted by a convicted killer on the run, approaching him and waking him up, then asking him to break his bread and pour his wine – identifying the fisherman with a Christ-like figure through a passing mention of the Eucharist. Not caring about who the man is but just about the fact that he is hungry and thirsty, the fisherman complies. Later, when two policemen arrive on the beach looking for the killer and wanting to interrogate the fisherman, they find out he has fallen asleep again. (Note: The ending lines of the song have also been interpreted to imply that the killer murdered the fisherman as well, in order to leave no witnesses behind; however, this is contradicted by the serene and joyful mood of the song, especially in its later arrangement.) The original version of the song features a simple folk/country arrangement, including two acoustic guitars, a double bass, a lap steel guitar, a whistled hook and no drums.

The song was revolutionized and turned into a rousing rock anthem during the famous 1979 concerts held by De André in Bologna and Florence with the progressive rock band Premiata Forneria Marconi, also known as PFM. The new version, mainly arranged by Franz Di Cioccio, features prominent keyboards, drums, percussion, electric guitars and a country fiddle, played by Lucio Fabbri, while the whistled melody is joyously sung by the entire band as a "la-la-la" choir. This version is the one De André kept performing live until his very last show.

Artists who recorded cover versions of the song include Mia Martini, who recorded a cover version of the song in her 1983 album Miei compagni di viaggio, Piero Pelù, Fiorella Mannoia (included in Fragile, her 2001 album) and the Hong Kong singer Albert Au, who adapted the song in Chinese with the title "Yīnwèi yǒu nǐ" (因为有你, transl. "Because I have you").

== Track listing ==
1. "Il pescatore" (Reverberi – Zauli [music] – De André [lyrics]) – 2:19
2. "Marcia nuziale" (Brassens [music] – De André [lyrics]) – 3:10

== Music video ==
A music video, directed by Stefano Salvati, was produced and released in 2017 for the original version of "Il pescatore". It is set in Ravenna in a contemporary context. It depicts the killer in the song as a (younger) fisherman himself, running from the police in order to reunite with his 10-year-old son; he keeps his crime hidden from the child, but the latter does find out the truth in the end.

== Charts ==
Chart	Peak position
Italy	13
