= Storia di un impiegato =

Studio album by Fabrizio De André
- Released: 1973
- Recorded: 1973
- Length: 35:34
- Labels: Produttori Associati; Ricordi; BMG
- Producers: Roberto Dané; Sergio Bardotti

Fabrizio De André chronology
Non al denaro, non all'amore né al cielo (1971)	Storia di un impiegato (1973)	Canzoni (1974)

Professional ratings
Review scores
Source	Rating
Allmusic	link

Storia di un impiegato ("Story of a white-collar worker") is an album released by Fabrizio De André. It was issued in 1973 by Produttori Associati and reissued several times by Ricordi and BMG.

== Track listing ==
1. Introduzione (Introduction) (1:42)
2. Canzone del Maggio (May's song) (2:24)
3. La bomba in testa (The bomb in the mind) (4:01)
4. Al ballo mascherato (At the masquerade ball) (5:12)
5. Sogno numero due (Dream number two) (3:13)
6. La canzone del padre (Father's song) (5:14)
7. Il bombarolo (The bomber) (4:20)
8. Verranno a chiederti del nostro amore (They'll come to ask you about our love) (4:19)
9. Nella mia ora di libertà (In my out-of-cell time) (5:09)

== Overview and songs ==
This is a concept album based on the Protests of 1968; its story-line is about a 30-year-old white-collar worker who chooses to join in the riots after listening to a song about the events of May 1968 in France.

- Introduzione and Canzone del Maggio set the scene, stimulating the protagonist's desire to join the protests.
- In La bomba in testa, he daydreams about building a bomb.
- In Al ballo mascherato, he attends a masquerade ball, whose attendees are all dressed up as famous characters from literature, history, movies, comics and even from the Bible. The song is intended as a satire of fame and celebrity.
- Sogno numero due is a spoken word piece, where the protagonist imagines being judged in a courtroom by an all-powerful judge, who is the ultimate symbol of power. Notably, De André never recorded a Sogno numero uno (i.e. "Dream number one"), although Sogno n° 1 was used as a title for a 2011 posthumous tribute album by conductor Geoff Westley.
- In Canzone del padre, the dream goes on and the singer imagines himself as his own father, which points out to the protagonist the vacuity of his current life, and further heightens his desire for revenge.
- In Il bombarolo, the protagonist actually builds and plants his bomb; however, in the last verse (where De André suddenly switches from first-person to third-person narrative), the bomb accidentally blows up a newsstand instead of the intended target, and the protagonist is imprisoned.
- Verranno a chiederti del nostro amore is a love song; the protagonist, now behind bars, reassures his woman that his love for her will never end. As the only song in the album which is not actually connected to the overarching story and functions well on its own, it became a hit and De André continued performing it live during his later years, independently from the album.
- In Nella mia ora di libertà, the protagonist talks about his life in prison; he recounts the trials he underwent and comes to the realization that collective struggle is more effective than what he could accomplish by himself, so he and his inmates rebel to the prison authorities and lock up their wardens. The lyrical tone of this song is notably more lightweight than the rest of the album.

== Personnel ==
- Fabrizio De André - Guitars, Vocals
- Silvano Chimenti - Guitars
- Bruno Battisti D'Amario - Guitars
- Daniele Patucchi - Bass guitar
- Enzo Restuccia - Drum kit
- Antonio Ferrelli - Double bass
- Nicola Piovani - Piano
- Giorgio Carnini - Synthesizer
