= Le nuvole =

Studio album by Fabrizio De André
- Released: September 24, 1990
- Genres: Folk, Pop, World music
- Length: 41:24
- Labels: Ricordi, Fonit Cetra
- Producers: Fabrizio De André, Mauro Pagani

Fabrizio De André chronology
Crêuza de mä (1984)	Le nuvole (1990)	Anime salve (1996)

Professional ratings
Review scores
Source	Rating
Allmusic	link

Le nuvole (The Clouds) is an album by Italian singer-songwriter Fabrizio De André, released in 1990. The songs were written by Fabrizio De André and Mauro Pagani. As Pagani revealed in an interview within the 2011 DVD biographical documentary series Dentro Faber (i.e. Inside Faber, the latter being De André's nickname in Genoese), he is responsible for the writing of most of the music, while De André wrote all of the lyrics – except for Don Raffaè, detailed below, whose lyric writing is shared between De André and singer-songwriter Massimo Bubola, and the lyrics to the two songs in Genoese on side B, "Mégu megún" and "'Â çímma", which De André co-wrote with fellow Genoan Ivano Fossati because, according to De André, his colleague's ability to play with the sounds and the inner melodies of the Genoese dialect was much better than his own. Pagani's collaboration with De André, always according to the Lombard musician, happened in an identical way for De André's previous album, Crêuza de mä, with Pagani setting to music De André's already fully written lyrics, on the basis of a few melodic ideas from the latter. His next songwriting collaboration with Fossati, on Anime salve, would be more equally balanced, with he and Fossati composing music by actually playing together.

== Track listing ==
=== Side A ===
1. "Le nuvole" [i.e.The clouds] (De André/Pagani) – 2:16
2. "Ottocento" [i.e. Eight hundred, but with a pun on "1800s" as described below] (De André/Pagani) – 4:56
3. "Don Raffaè" (De André/Massimo Bubola – De André/Pagani) – 4:08
4. "La domenica delle salme" [i.e. Corpses' Sunday, a pun on Palm Sunday] (De André/Pagani) – 7:35

=== Side B ===
1. "Mégu megún" [i.e. Doctor, great doctor] (De André/Ivano Fossati – De André/Pagani) – 5:22
2. "La nova gelosia" [i.e. The new blind] (Neapolitan anonymous, 18th Century) – 3:04
3. "'Â çímma" [a typical Genoan dish, read below] (De André/Fossati – De André/Pagani) – 6:18
4. "Monti di Mola" [i.e. Mountains of Mola, the Gallurese name for today's Costa Smeralda] (De André/Pagani) – 7:45

== Overview and songs ==
The two sides on the original vinyl album are meant to be contrasting. Side A concerns contemporary society and the songs are all written in Italian, except for "Don Raffaé" (see below), written in a very Italianized Neapolitan. Side B concerns traditions and stories from the past, and the songs are written in three different languages spoken within Italy.

=== Side A ===
- "Le nuvole" features an orchestral background written by Pagani and orchestrated by Piero Milesi, over which two Sardinian women, who were chosen for their age difference (the elder Lalla Pisano and the young Maria Mereu) recite a free-verse poem apparently about clouds; the real subjects in the poem, which is inspired by Aristophanes's same-titled comedy, are in fact prominent figures who disturb and disrupt ordinary people's lives, namely politicians and powerful business managers.
- "Ottocento" is an intentionally funny song sung by De André in a mock-operatic style, musically set as a parody of a late 1800s operetta waltz, and inspired by his colleague and friend Francesco Baccini, whose lyrics are a satire of the hustle and bustle of modern life. It also features a section in tempo rubato, where De André, singing normally, mocks the dramatic style and subject matter of his own early compositions, such as "La canzone di Marinella". After the interlude, De Andrè moves into a faux-German section, comically mixing authentic German words with Italian "Germanized" ones. (Eine kleine Pinzimonie, wunder Matrimonie, Krauten und Erbeeren... etc.) This section, which is supposed to be set in Tyrol, leads to the coda of the song, an increasingly fast yodel. All of the instrumentation in the song is orchestral. When performing it live, during his 1990–1991 tour to promote the album, De André wore a black tie attire, to underline the satirical aspects of the lyrics, and sang the entire song while standing up – which was extremely unusual for him. He ran offstage during the yodel section and reappeared onstage shortly thereafter, for "Don Raffaé", in his usual stage outfit – bleached jeans and a black sweater.
- "Don Raffaè" is a satirical/parody song about Italian Camorra boss Raffaele Cutolo, partly sung in Neapolitan from the point of view of a jailer in the Poggioreale prison where Cutolo is kept; by portraying the character as a close friend of the titular Raffaele's, De André uses references to the real Cutolo (such as the famous "maxi-trial" in the late Eighties, where he was sentenced to life imprisonment), never naming him explicitly, to spoof a number of well-known Italian stereotypes about Camorra, Naples and Neapolitans in general. An ironical footnote printed in the booklet after the lyrics says: "The facts and characters in this song are fictional. Any references to actual people are nothing but coincidences." In 1992 the song was covered by Roberto Murolo as a duet with De André; Murolo's cover is included in his album Ottantavogliadicantare, celebrating the singer's 80th birthday – the album's title being a pun on Ho tanta voglia (i.e. I feel like (singing) so much) and ottanta (i.e. eighty). For Murolo's cover, the arrangement was changed into a slightly slower and more traditionally Neapolitan-sounding tarantella beat, featuring additional keyboards and percussion.
- "La domenica delle salme" describes the dissolution (and, more generically, the loss of importance) of the Communist ideology in Europe at the end of the 1980s, and the ensuing political chaos caused in Italy by such dissolution, again without explicitly mentioning anyone's names, but depicting a series of grotesque, highly stylized characters and situations. De André's utter, resentful disillusionment with the then-current political outlook is underlined by his occasional use of vulgar language: an imaginary "Minister of Rainstorms" is described by the singer as "hop[ing] for democracy with a tablecloth in his hands and his hands on his bollocks"; describing a woman climbing up a section of the just-demolished Berlin Wall, he sings: "While she was climbing, every one of us saw her ass"; later on, talking about his singer-songwriter colleagues in Italy and accusing them of having forsaken their political stance in the name of commercialism, he remembers that "All of you had powerful voices, fitting for a «fuck you!»". The music for this song, consisting of an almost-recited, low-key monologue over two intervals of no more than five notes each, and backed by a complex acoustic guitar accompaniment in 9/8, has been described by De André and Pagani at the time (namely, on the eighth and final volume of the Dentro Faber DVD series) as very forced and almost unsingable, as it was written after the lyrics and meant to adapt to them, rather than vice versa.

Side A also features two piano excerpts from Tchaikovsky's "The Seasons", before and after "Don Raffaé", played by pianist Andrea Carcano. Furthermore, the side opens and closes with the sound of grasshoppers singing, which symbolizes people talking endlessly and aimlessly.

=== Side B ===
- "Mégu megún", written in Genoese, is a satirical song about deficiencies and malpractice in the Italian health care system, personified by a greedy physician who cares much more about money than about his patients' well-being. De André's sparse usage of profanity emerges again here: "Ooh, what a fucking contract you would make me sign!" The song has a world music feel, with Pagani playing several ethnic instruments and singing backing vocals in an invented, pseudo-African language ("ooh welele, ooh welelele").
- "La nova gelosia" is De André's rendition of a romantic anonymous song from 1700s Naples, which he learnt from Roberto Murolo (who recorded it earlier). The lyrics, written in a poetical, literary form of Neapolitan, are a lament by a young boy in love with a girl who has recently installed a new blind on her window; the boy implores the blind itself, which is adorned with small, shining golden nails, to stay open and let him see his loved one, otherwise he will die. The song was not included in the setlist of De André's 1990–'91 promotional tour for the album, as its delicate instrumentation did not translate well to an arena stage.
- "Â çímma", in Genoese, is a very detailed description of a Genoan recipe for a traditional boiled stuffed veal dish. The preparation process and the ingredients are described at length in the lyrics. The lyrics also mention some ancient folk traditions, such as setting a broom upright in a corner to keep witches away from the kitchen; according to the tradition, if a witch came into the kitchen by sliding down the chimney and the fireplace, she was compelled by the desire to count all of the bristles in the broom and would not stop until dawn, when she was forced to leave. The final verse mentions the fact that a bachelor is entitled to give the first knife-cut to the finished dish. After singing this as the second-to-last line of the last verse, De André finishes the verse by singing: "Eat, eat, you don't know who will eat you" - a pointed reference to death.
- "Monti di Mola" ("Mountains of Mola"), a song written in Gallurese, set in Gallura and inspired by a local folk tale, describes a love affair between a female donkey and a young shepherd. They fall passionately in love with each other and want to marry, but they are unable to, because their birth certificates reveal them to be first cousins. The song, like most of Side B, features a simple, folk-based arrangement, once again adorned by a variety of ethnic instruments played by Pagani. Sardinian trio Tazenda sing backing vocals on the track, which, like "La nova gelosia", was never performed live by De André.

== Personnel ==
Among its musicians, the album features prominent Italian sessionmen Lele Melotti, Paolo Costa, Amedeo Bianchi and Demo Morselli, as well as members of De André's regular live band at the time, such as ethnologist Mario Arcari and guitarist Michele Ascolese; Flavio Premoli from PFM and "Rocco Tanica" from Elio e le Storie Tese are also featured, the latter credited with his real name (Sergio Conforti). De André himself provides only vocals without playing any instruments.

=== "Le nuvole" ===
- Orchestra arranged by Piero Milesi and Sergio Conforti, conducted by Piero Milesi
- Livia Baldi, Stefano Barneschi, Maria Cristina Vasi, Emanuela Sfondrini, Brigid Sinead Nava, Debora Tedeschi, Elena Confortini, Martino Lovisolo, Carla Marotta, Giacomo Trevisani, Enrico Onofri, Carlo De Martini – Violins
- Anna Maria Gallingani, Sebastiano Borella Cristina Cassiani Ingoni, Carlo Goj – Violas
- Adriano Ancarani, Enrico Martinelli, Silvio Righini, Beatrice Cosma Pomarico, Jorge Alberto Guerrero, Caterina Dell'Agnello – Cellos
- Giuseppe Barbareschi, Roberto Bonati – Double basses
- Giovanni Antonini, Michele Brescia – Flutes
- Francesco Pomarico – Oboe
- Sergio Orlandi, Umberto Marcandalli, Luciano Marconcini – Trumpets
- Luca Quaranta, Maria Gabriella Giaquinta, Adelia Colombo, Gianfranco Scafidi – French horns
- Luisa Vinci, Alessio Nava – Trombones
- Nicola Zuccalà – Clarinet
- David Searcy – Timpani and triangle
- Lalla Pisano, Maria Mereu – Spoken vocals (Note: The two otherwise anonymous women from Alghero who provide the spoken vocals were chosen for the huge age gap between them; they were reported at the time to be respectively 95 and 20.)

=== "Ottocento" ===
This track features the same orchestra as in the previous track, without the spoken vocals and adding the following:

- Fabrizio De André: Main vocal
- Choir: Lucia Vivien Pick, Diane Rama, Nadia Pellicciari (sopranos); Giuseppe Lopopolo, Giuseppe Donno (tenors); Carlo Proverbio, Bortolo Laffranchi, Alessandro Cairoli (baritones); Lucio Folilela (bass)
- Flavio Premoli – Accordion
- Paolo Somià – Yodeling

=== "Don Raffaè" ===
- Fabrizio De André – Vocals
- Michele Ascolese – Classical guitar
- Lele Melotti – Drum kit
- Paolo Costa – Bass guitar
- Sergio Conforti – Piano
- Amedeo Bianchi and Mario Arcari – Clarinets
- Demo Morselli – Trumpet, trombone, tuba
- Renato Rivolta – Piccolo
- Mauro Pagani – Mandolin
- Alfio Antico – Tammorra (Southern-Italian frame drum)

As noted above, Tchaikovsky's piano interludes before and after "Don Raffaè" are played by classical pianist Andrea Carcano.

=== "La domenica delle salme" ===
- Fabrizio De André – Vocals
- Michele Ascolese – Classical guitar (multi-tracked)
- Mauro Pagani – Violin and kazoo

=== "Mégu megún" ===
- Fabrizio De André – Vocals
- Mauro Pagani – Oud, bouzouki, lyre, 'ndelele (Pagani's invented name for a violin plucked with a guitar plectrum) and backing vocals
- Sergio Conforti – Keyboards
- Mario Arcari – Shehnai
- Walter Calloni – Drum kit
- Esteban Candelabro "Candelo" Cabezas – Percussion
- Paolo Costa – Bass guitar

=== "La nova gelosia" ===
- Fabrizio De André – Vocals
- Michele Ascolese – Classical guitar (multi-tracked)
- Franco Formenti – Viola

=== "'Â çímma" ===
- Fabrizio De André – Vocals
- Mauro Pagani – 'Ndelele (see above) and bouzouki
- Sergio Conforti – Synthesizers
- Flavio Premoli – Accordion
- Franco Pettinari – Hurdy-gurdy
- Walter Calloni – Drum kit
- Angelo Pusceddu – Percussion
- Paolo Costa – Bass guitar
- Federico Sanesi – Darbuka

=== "Monti di Mola" ===
- Fabrizio De André – Vocals (main and backing)
- Mauro Pagani – Bansuri, recorder in G, bouzouki, backing vocals
- Tazenda – backing vocals
- Sergio Conforti – Harmonium
- Flavio Premoli – Accordion
- Walter Calloni – Drum kit
- Angelo Pusceddu – Percussion
- Paolo Costa – Bass guitar

== Artwork ==
The album's first print run featured a hologram, created by Italian advertising companies Area di Comunicazione and Light Impressions Europe, on a photo of clouds by Milan-based photographer Massimo "Max" Quinque. The hologram was not featured in subsequent reprints, which instead included Quinque's original photo. However, the 2018 vinyl reprint by Sony Music within their Fabrizio De Andrè Vinyl Collection features an enlarged version of the hologram.

== Awards ==
- The album won the 1991 "Targa Tenco" prize for albums
- La domenica delle salme won the 1991 "Targa Tenco" prize for song

== Certifications ==
Certifications for Le nuvole
Region	Certification	Certified units/sales
Italy (FIMI) Sales + streams since 2009	Gold	25,000^{‡}
^{‡} Sales+streaming figures based on certification alone.
