= Non al denaro non all'amore né al cielo =

Studio album by Fabrizio De André
- Released: 1971
- Recorded: 1971
- Length: 31:15
- Labels: Produttori Associati; Ricordi; BMG
- Producers: Roberto Dané; Sergio Bardotti

Fabrizio De André chronology
La buona novella (1970)	Non al denaro non all'amore né al cielo (1971)	Storia di un impiegato (1973)

Professional ratings
Review scores
Source	Rating
Allmusic	link

Non al denaro non all'amore né al cielo (Neither to money, nor to love, nor to Heaven) is an album released by Fabrizio De André. It was issued in 1971 by Produttori Associati and reissued several times by Ricordi and BMG. It is a concept album based on the Spoon River Anthology by Edgar Lee Masters. The co-author of the music is composer Nicola Piovani, who later won an Academy Award for his soundtrack for Roberto Benigni's Life is beautiful. The title itself is a quotation from the first poem in the Spoon River Anthology, The Hill:

Drinking, rioting, thinking neither of wife nor kin,
Nor gold, nor love, nor heaven?

== Track listing ==
All lyrics by De André and Giuseppe Bentivoglio, based on poems by Edgar Lee Masters (see below); all music by De André and Nicola Piovani.

1. "La collina" (The Hill) (4:03)
2. "Un matto (dietro ogni scemo c'è un villaggio)" (A Madman - Behind every madman there is a village) (2:35)
3. "Un giudice" (A Judge) (2:55)
4. "Un blasfemo (dietro ogni blasfemo c'è un giardino incantato)" (A Blasphemer - Behind every blasphemer there is an enchanted garden) (2:59)
5. "Un malato di cuore" (A Sufferer of Heart) (4:18)
6. "Un medico" (A Doctor) (2:39)
7. "Un chimico" (A Chemist) (3:00)
8. "Un ottico" (An Optician) (4:35)
9. "Il suonatore Jones" (Fiddler Jones) (4:25)

== The songs ==
All songs are based on writer Fernanda Pivano's first-ever English-to-Italian translation - which happened to be the Spoon River Anthology. Pivano, who later became a prolific translator, obtained the book as a loan from her friend and fellow poet/writer Cesare Pavese, who urged her to read it. She found it so moving that she felt compelled to start translating it into Italian - without telling anything to Pavese, a translator himself, out of her fear that he may scold her for getting professionally involved with such "low" material. However, Pavese later came across Pivano's translation by pure chance, he was impressed and convinced Pivano to publish it. The translated poems were further rewritten by De André with lyricist/writer Giuseppe Bentivoglio. Notably, all of Edgar Lee Masters's characters have names, while De André's do not ("A Madman", "A Judge", "A Blasphemer" etc.). De André, interviewed by Pivano in the album's notes, stated that the first 5 songs are about envy, where the last 4 are about science and ambition as seen by scientists and their efforts. Each of these two subjects was successfully addressed in songs such as "Un malato di cuore" and "Il suonatore Jones".

- "La collina" is based on "The Hill", listing various people who are buried in the imaginary Spoon River churchyard and stating that "All are sleeping on the Hill". This song is the only one in the album which mentions people's names (which, however, are never used in the following songs, except for a mention of "Jenny" in "Il suonatore Jones").
- "Un matto" is based on "Frank Drummer", in which a man memorizes the Encyclopædia Britannica (Treccani in De André's version) and is considered crazy by the people of Spoon River.
- "Un Giudice" is based on "Selah Lively", the story of a midget who studies law and becomes a judge to get revenge on the people who made fun of him all his life - thus revealing that his moral stature is as low as his physical one. In a single line of his lyrics, De André uses deliberately vulgar, scurrilous language ("A midget must surely be a swine, because his heart is way too close to his asshole"), quite far from Masters's restrained style, to underline people's nastiness toward the protagonist.
- "Un blasfemo" is based on "Wendell P. Bloyd", a non-believer who practices blasphemy and keeps on not believing even when, after his death, he is welcomed into the Garden of Eden. De André also uses Biblical imagery as metaphors for various forms of power in late 1960s/early 1970s Italy, such as political power and police power.
- "Un malato di cuore" is based on "Francis Turner", the story of a man with an unspecified heart disease who envies healthy people, and dies of a heart attack while giving his first kiss. The quasi-classical arrangement of the song features melodic wordless lines sung by Edda Dell'Orso and, at the end, an excerpt from the second movement (Largo) of Antonio Vivaldi's "Winter", from The Four Seasons.
- "Un medico" is based on "Dr. Siegfried Iseman", the story of a doctor who wants to cure poor people without receiving payment. At the end of the song, the doctor is deemed a trickster and imprisoned for having sold flower extracts as an elixir of life.
- "Un chimico" is based on "Trainor, the Druggist", in which an unmarried chemist, who does not understand anything about romantic relationships but instead loves chemical elements, dies while executing an experiment - in De André's melancholic conclusion, "just like those idiots who die of love, and somebody would say that there's a better way". The music for this song was stated by De André to be an adaption of an English folk tune.
- "Un ottico" is based on "Dippold the Optician", the story of an optician who, after his passing, only wants to create special glasses which project strange visions. De André's "updated" description of him, through the words of his imaginary "customers", makes him similar to Timothy Leary - a promoter of LSD and mind-expanding hallucinogenic drugs. The highly complex, multi-part musical arrangement features another excerpt from Vivaldi's "Winter", this time from its first movement (Allegro), played on electric guitar.
- "Il suonatore Jones" is based on "Fiddler Jones". De André identified himself with the itinerant musician who plays without asking or hoping for any kinds of rewards, but just out of pure joy in playing. In the final verse of his lyrics, the musician's instrument was changed from a fiddle into a flute, for metrical reasons. Edda Dell'Orso is featured again here, singing a wordless coda.

== Live performances and Morgan's 2005 remake ==
Unusually for a De André album, most of the songs on it were never performed live by the author, the only song regularly featured in his live sets being the fast, country-flavoured "Un giudice". In an interview excerpt included within the eighth and last DVD (Poesia in forma di canzone - "Poetry as songs") of the 2011 eight-disc documentary series Dentro Faber (i.e. Inside Faber, about his life and works), De André stated that most of the songs on the album were either too poetical, something which the singer-songwriter felt would not translate well in a live context, or too musically complex to play live; he cited "Un ottico" as an example of the latter, as that song features four sections in different tempos and includes overlapping vocals (originally recorded by De André singing the same lines twice, with a heavy delay effect), displaying a progressive rock influence.

In 2005, the entire album was faithfully remade by singer-songwriter and multi-instrumentalist Morgan, who also re-arranged the various excerpts of classical music (particularly from Vivaldi's Four Seasons) featured on the original album. Soon after the release of his version on CD, Morgan successfully toured Italy and Europe with it.

== Cover artwork ==
The artwork for the original album, created by advertising designer Deanna Galletto, is a drawing of an orange box floating in a blue sky with smoke-like clouds. The box, whose front door is half-open on the main cover, is revealed on the inner gatefold to "contain" six characters, three males and three females, drawn on squared paper and unrelated to the characters in the songs, walking in an idealized Eden setting. The outer jacket does not include lyrics (which are instead featured on the inner sleeve), but contains an interview with De André conducted by Fernanda Pivano. The inner sleeve, along with the lyrics, also includes an imaginary interview with Edgar Lee Masters, compiled by Pivano from various writings by the American author.

The artwork for Morgan's 2005 remake, created by the design company MoltiMedia.it with contributions from Morgan himself, and referred to by the musician, in the visual (DVD) section of the album's DualDisc release, as "a deferential parody", is a photo of an actual orange wooden box, glued to the right side of an old wall in a house; the wall is painted in a sky-blue colour, with several areas of paint having fallen off to reveal a grayish tint, and puffs of white smoke rise up from below. Similarly to the original cover, the front door of the box is half-open, and another photo on the CD tray reveals the box to be a small closet full of old-fashioned medicine bottles; each bottle is labeled with a pictorial rendition of a song title and, on three bottles, the lyrics to the corresponding song, although not all labels are fully visible. The back cover is a photo of Morgan standing in a field, in the distance and with his back to the camera, seen through a two-pane window in the same sky-blue/gray old wall on the front cover, and implied to be part of the same house; Morgan is seen through the pane on the right, while the one on the left frames a bare tree.
