= Crêuza de mä =

Studio album by Fabrizio De André
- Released: March 1984
- Genres: Folk; world music
- Length: 33:29
- Language: Ligurian
- Label: Ricordi
- Producers: Mauro Pagani; Fabrizio De André

Fabrizio De André chronology
Fabrizio De André (1981)	Crêuza de mä (1984)	Le nuvole (1990)

Professional ratings
Review scores
Source	Rating
Allmusic	4.5/5 stars

Crêuza de mä (pronounced [ˈkɾøːza de ˈmaː]; (Note: In the documentary video Filming Around Tour, on the bonus DVD bundled with Cristiano De André's 2009 live tribute album De André canta De André, Cristiano jokingly mentions how similar was his father's (incorrect) pronunciation of the German surname 'Kreutzer' to the Geneose pronunciation of crêuza. The album's title track, which Cristiano and his band performed on tour, ended up being always referred to by everyone, during the tour itself, as Kreutzer del mar.) "Muletrack by the sea") (Note: In his liner notes, De André explained that the translation of crêuza as "muletrack" is improper, as the crêuza, in and around Genoa, is a narrow alleyway marking the border between two houses or properties.) is the eleventh studio album by Fabrizio De André, entirely sung in the Ligurian language, more specifically in the dialect of Genoa. All the songs were written by De André and Mauro Pagani, with all lyrics by the former and music mostly by the latter; in a 2011 interview within the documentary DVD series Dentro Faber ("Inside Faber" [i.e. De André]), about De André's life and works, Pagani stated that his job on the album was to create melodies and arrangements for De André's already complete lyrics, on the basis of some "over-simplified" melodic ideas by the Genoese songwriter. Halfway through the album sessions, responding to Pagani's repeated concerns that the lyrics would be incomprehensible outside of Genoa, De André reassured his friend by telling him that his music was so good that even Sicilians would get the meaning of the songs without understanding a single word. However, full Italian translations of the lyrics (by De André himself) were included in the album's liner notes.
The album was seen by Italian reviewers at the time as a milestone of Eighties music and of world music in general. David Byrne, talking to Rolling Stone, named the album as one of the most important releases of the decade, and the Italian edition of Rolling Stone ranked it fourth in its 2012 "List of the 100 Best-Ever Italian Albums", published on its 100th Italian issue.

== Track listing ==
All lyrics by Fabrizio De André; music by Mauro Pagani and Fabrizio De André, except as noted below.

1. Crêuza de mä ("Muletrack by the sea") – 6:16
2. Jamin-a ("Jamina", an Arabic female name) – 4:52
3. Sidún (i.e. Sidon, in Lebanon) – 6:25
4. Sinán Capudán Pasciá ("Sinàn Captain Pasha") – 5:32
5. ’Â píttima ("The flea", a derogatory nickname for a tax revenue officer) – 3:43
6. ’Â duménega ("On Sunday") – 3:40 (De André [lyrics], Pagani [music])
7. D'ä mæ riva ("From my shore") – 3:04

== The songs ==
With the notable exceptions of "Jamin-a", inspired by De André and Pagani's then-recent trips to Africa and the Middle East, and "Sidún", focusing on the 1982 Lebanon war, all songs are about Genoa. In particular:

- "Crêuza de mä" is about the hard working life of sailors and fishermen in Genoa, but also displays their serene mood when gathering together for dinner. The lyrics mention various traditional Genoan dishes (as well as some unrealistic, invented ones), which are allegedly served in "Andrea's house" [i.e. a tavern] - Andrea being a fantasy character "who is not a sailor", possibly representing De André himself (Note: In his 1990 satirical song "La domenica delle salme", De André would talk about "me and my illustrious cousin de Andrade", referring to Brazilian poet Oswald de Andrade, who is obviously not related at all to De André. Also, in "Crêuza", the name Dria (Andrea) is always sung in context as "du Dria" (i.e. "at Andrea's [place]"), which sounds vaguely like "De André".) as someone who is extraneous to the sailors' world, and in whose world the sailors view themselves as misfits. The instrumentation featured in the song is mostly ethnic, with Pagani playing a recurring riff on a violin plucked with a guitar plectrum, referred to by the invented name of 'ndelele; the chorus, built on a polymetric structure of three bars (respectively of 5/4, 6/4 and 4/4), is sung by De André and Pagani using meaningless words (eh anda, yey yey anda, yey yey yey anda, ayo), sounding more like Sardinian (another favourite language of De André's) than Genoese, and the song ends with chants and hollers by fishmongers and seafood vendors, recorded live by Pagani in the Genoa fish market. In Dentro Faber, Pagani said he felt lucky for the fact that all vendors sang in a perfect D major key (the key of the main song), most of them without having the faintest idea of what a key is.
  Translation of original Genoese lyrics to "Crêuza de mä"
  The opening line, defining the mood of the whole song, reads: "Umbre de muri, muri de mainæ / dunde ne vegnî, duve l'è che'anæ?" ["Shadows of faces, faces of sailors / where did you come from and where are you going?"] As already mentioned, the Ligurian expression crêuza de mä, in the Genoa area, defines a path or mule track, sometimes made of steps, which usually defines the boundaries of private property and connects (as indeed do virtually all roads in Liguria) the hinterland with the sea. The literal translation is therefore "sea lane". The lyrics are about sailors who, returning from the sea - poetically described as a place where the moon is bare (i.e. not shaded by hills, plants or houses) and where the night points its knife to men's throats - go to eat at Andrea's tavern, they drink at the fountain of doves in the stone house, and think of who they might find there: people from Lugano, people whose faces resemble those of pickpockets ("mandillä" in Genoese) and who prefer eating "the wing of the sea bass" (since fish obviously don't have any wings, this part doesn't seem to make much sense but it may a subtle metaphor: according to some interpretations the fish would symbolise Jesus [in fact the sign of the fish, also known as "Jesus fish" or Ichthys, was the first symbol of Christianity] and the words "preferiscian l'ä" ["they prefer the wing"] sound a lot like "preferiscian Allah", therefore the meaning would be that those people prefer Allah to Jesus and thus they must be Islamic sailors in disguise, probably Moors from Sicily or southern Spain, which were frowned upon and fought by the Republic of Genoa during the Middle Ages. This interpretation was never confirmed though, so it's just speculation). At the tavern they also see some well-born girls of easy morals "whom you may stare at without a condom" (it's rumoured that De André had initially planned to write "beciàle", a vulgar expression which means "to shag / screw them" but had to change it to "ammiàle", namely "stare at them" in order to avoid censorship by the record label and radio stations; the reasoning makes sense since it's obvious that one doesn't use a condom to stare to people, thus the possibility of a sexual intercourse is clearly implied in those lyrics). The lyrics then focus closer on the figure of sailors and their lives as eternal travelers, and more precisely on a night return of sailors to shore, almost as strangers. De André talks about their feelings, about their experiences on their skin, about the rawness of being at the real mercy of the elements; in the following verse, an ostentatiously joking distrust emerges, which can be seen in the assortment of food imagined, acceptable and normal (or nearly so, for a true sailor), as opposed to other dishes, such as lamb brains, or a sweet-and-sour hash of "hare of tiles" (i.e. the cat, passed off as a sort of rabbit), decidedly and deliberately less acceptable; these are evidently quoted to ironize about the reliability and steadfastness of Andrea (about whom it is stressed that he is not a sailor) and, perhaps, of a whole world to which they know they do not belong.
- "Jamin-a" is about an Arabian prostitute, represented as both fascinating and sinister. Introducing the song in his live shows from the era, as testified on Dentro Faber, De André described Jamina as "a refuge, a safe harbour which sailors travelling all over the world for months and months on end look forward to coming back to, even if they know she could potentially destroy them."
- "Sidún" describes the destruction of Sidon in 1982. In the lyrics, the city is personified as a man holding a newborn baby and trying to lull him to sleep, even if he knows he is dying. (According to another interpretation given by British blogger Dennis Criteser in his blog Fabrizio De André in English, containing Criteser's English translations of every single song released by De André, the lyrics are a portrait of an actual Lebanese woman, whom Pagani and De André met in Sidon, whose infant son had just been crushed by a tank and was dying.) After the narrative ends, the song goes into a multitracked, extended vocalization section, again sounding more like Sardinian tenores than anything related to Genoa or Liguria or the Middle East.
- "Sinán Capudán Pasciá" is the story of the eponymous character, a braggart from 1500s Genoa (historically known as either Scipione Cicala or Cığalazade Yusuf Sinan Pasha), who was captured by the Moors and later fell into the graces of Sultan Mehmed III, eventually rising to the rank of Grand Vizier. The song notably marks a departure from De André's usually serious, occasionally somber style into a lightweight one, almost bordering on comedy with his repeated quote of a popular Ligurian refrain about fish in the sea. He would later adopt the same style in songs such as the mock-operatic "Ottocento", "Mégu megún", and, with a stronger satirical vein, "Don Raffaè", all from his 1990 album Le nuvole.
- "’Â píttima" is a bittersweet song, simultaneously scornful and sympathetic, about a man who chose an unpopular job as his way to earn a living. The arrangement of the song is yet again built on a number of ethnic stringed instruments from the Middle East, all played by Pagani.
- "’Â duménega" is a jokey song about prostitutes being allowed to walk freely through the streets of early 1900s Genoa on Sundays, and about the township exploiting the "income" generated by prostitution to pay for the works in the Genoa port. In the last verse, De André jokes about the Mayor being such a narrow-minded, bigoted man that he insults the prostitutes without realizing that his own wife is among them. The music is written in the rhythm and style of a fast tarantella, very reminiscent of De André's early compositions. In an interview from the era, De André emphasized the song as a show-off for Pagani's compositional strength, with the latter explicitly telling the former that he was going to write a piece in "pure De André style". Pagani, in turn, confirmed that he composed all of the music for the song on his own, warning De André that people would say "Ah, there goes old-time Fabrizio!" about the song.
- "D’ä mê riva" is a regretful and nostalgic lament of a sailor leaving Genoa for an unknown destination, maybe for good, while his girlfriend watches him sailing away from the shore and waves him goodbye holding a handkerchief. (The word "Zena", used within the ending lyrics to the song, may vaguely sound in context like a female name, but it is actually the name of Genoa in Genoese.) The song is the only one on the album where De André actually plays an instrument, namely a simple arpeggiated part on a small high-strung guitar, referred to as an octave guitar.

== Personnel ==
- Fabrizio De André - "Octave guitar" on "D'ä mê riva" and vocals
- Mario Arcari - Shehnai and clarinet on "Jamin-a"
- Aldo Banfi - Synclavier
- François Bedel - Goblet drum and percussion instruments
- Francis Biggi - Consultancy on medieval and ethnic instruments
- Walter Calloni - Drum kit
- Dino D'Autorio - Bass guitar on "Sinàn Capudàn Pascià"
- Edo Martin - Yamaha GS-2 electronic piano
- Franco Mussida - Classical guitar and electric mandolins on "Â duménega"
- Mauro Pagani - Oud, bağlama, bouzouki, mandolas, mandolins, plucked violin [also named 'ndelele in the liner notes], plucked viola, Roland SPV-335 synthesizer module and vocals
- Maurizio Preti - Percussion
- Massimo Spinosa - Bass guitar, audio editing
- Domna Samiou - Introduction to "Crêuza de mä" from Aria per gaida sola [i.e. "Aria for solo gaida", a folk tune sampled from Samiou's 1976 album Il flauto greco ("The Greek flute")].

== Artwork ==
The album cover, seen by Italian music reviewers at the time as simultaneously attractive and mysterious, was later revealed by Pagani to be a photo of a house in Greece, shot by American photographer Jay Maisel and chosen by Pagani himself in keeping with the album's overall Mediterranean theme. On the inner gatefold cover, a Greek motif is used as well, to frame the lyrics.

== 30th anniversary remix/reissue ==
In 2014, for its 30th anniversary, the album was thoroughly remixed by Pagani, who went back to the original tapes and, after "de-mastering" them (i.e. removing all layers of digital remastering made over the years, in order to obtain flat transfers), mixed all the songs anew, bringing out previously obscured details. The result of his efforts was released as a 2-disc box set. Disc 1 includes the remixed album, a previously unreleased version of "Jamin-a" (faster than the original, in a higher key, with a deliberately strained vocal by De André [also double-tracked on the final repeated verse], featuring prominent drums and no percussion) and three alternate mixes of "Sinàn Capudàn Pascià", "Â duménega" and the title track. (Note: The alternate mix of "Crêuza de mä", the only substantially different one, starts with an a cappella chorus and features no drums up to the very last verse and chorus, which also dissolves to an a cappella rendition of it and avoids the transition to the fishmongers' chants.) Disc 2, titled La mia Genova (i.e. My own Genoa), includes live renditions, taken from De André's 1984 and 1991 tours, of all tracks from the album except for "D'ä mê riva", plus "'Â çímma" and "Mégu megún" from Le nuvole and three spoken intros; "D'ä mê riva", which was never performed live by De André, is featured as a solo live performance by Pagani, accompanying himself on bouzouki and featuring Andrea Parodi from Tazenda, recorded in 2004 for his own live tribute to the album.
