= Rimini (album) =

Studio album by Fabrizio De André
- Released: March 31, 1978
- Genre: Folk, rock
- Length: 40:29
- Label: Ricordi; BMG
- Producer: Tony Mimms

Fabrizio De André chronology
Volume 8 (1975)	Rimini (1978)	Fabrizio De André (1981)

Professional ratings
Review scores
Source	Rating
Allmusic	link

Rimini is an album released by Italian singer/songwriter Fabrizio De André. It was first issued in 1978 on Ricordi and then re-released by BMG. The songs were written by Fabrizio De André and Massimo Bubola. Two of them are De André's first forays into overtly political themes, which will be a recurring subject of his in later years. The album is also the only one in De André's output to include two fully instrumental tracks with no lyrics and no vocals. (The 2011 tribute album Sogno n° 1 does include an instrumental track, but it is a re-recorded version of a piece originally recorded with spoken-word lyrics.)

== Track listing ==
1. "Rimini" (4:08)
2. "Volta la carta" (3:49)
3. "Coda di lupo" (5:24)
4. "Andrea" (5:31)
5. "Tema di Rimini" (1:52)
6. "Avventura a Durango" (4:51)
7. "Sally" (4:49)
8. "Zirichiltaggia" (2:18)
9. "Parlando del naufragio della London Valour" (4:41)
10. "Folaghe" (2:58)

All songs were written by Fabrizio De André and Massimo Bubola, except for "Avventura a Durango", based on the music of "Romance in Durango", by Bob Dylan and Jacques Levy.

== The songs ==
- "Rimini" is a soft, drumless ballad in 12/8, including a string orchestra and a choir. Its lyrics paint an ironical portrait of a waitress working at a bar in mid-1960s Rimini, who was shamed for having an illicit affair with a lifeguard, only to have an abortion later on. She is first described in a fantasy setting (a pirate's daughter, who sailed with Christopher Columbus) and then as she really is (a grocer's daughter working as a waitress).
- "Volta la carta" ("Turn the page") uses a musical framework inspired by an Irish jig with the metrical structure and imagery of a popular Italian rhyme, to tell the story of a young girl named Angiolina, who, after a short engagement to a carabiniere, goes through a romantic fling with a foreign, possibly military, aircraft pilot. According to a statement by co-writer Bubola within the eighth and last DVD (Poesia in forma di canzone - "Poetry as songs") of the 8-DVD documentary series Dentro Faber ["Inside Faber", about De André's life and career], released in 2011, the line "the foreign boy's got an orchestral record which spins fast and talks about love" is intended as a dig at James Last, whose over-sentimentalized orchestral renditions of classical pieces and pop songs were becoming popular in Italy towards the end of the Seventies, after having been huge hits all across Europe. Like other singer-songwriters from the era, De André and Bubola strongly disliked Last.
- "Coda di lupo" ("Wolf's Tail") is about an imaginary Native American boy, whose life story is used as a pretext to describe the conflict between extreme left-wing political movements in Italy and the Italian Communist party, the largest in Europe, which resulted in the failure of the former and the dissolution of the Red Brigades at the end of the Seventies. The same theme is explored again in the album's penultimate track.
- "Andrea" (a male name in Italian) is a folk ballad about a gay soldier whose lover, a curly dark-haired young man, was killed in Trento during World War II. By the end of the song, which is set to a passionately melodic, Mediterranean tune, Andrea is contemplating suicide by throwing himself into a deep well. However, the story is not finished in the song, whose final lines have Andrea wondering whether the well is "deeper than [him]self". When introducing the song in live performances, De André jokingly commented about the poetical aspect of the name given by Plato to homosexual people, i.e. "children of the Moon".
- "Tema di Rimini" ("Rimini Theme") is an orchestral segue from "Andrea", which reprises the musical theme from "Rimini" with a different tempo and time signature.
- "Avventura a Durango" is, as stated above, a translation of Bob Dylan's "Romance in Durango", from his 1976 album Desire, about a killer trying to escape to Durango with his wife Magdalena [Margarita in the original lyrics] - only to be killed himself in the end by a sniper. De André and Bubola sing the chorus in Neapolitan, substituting Dylan's South American Spanish lines.
- "Sally" is a melodic ballad in 12/8 with a prominent instrumental interlude played on an accordion, about a child's fear of the unknown while simultaneously being attracted by it, a theme which De André will explore further in later songs.
- "Zirichiltaggia" is De André's first-ever song not in Italian. A very fast country/bluegrass number written entirely in Gallurese, it consists in a comical quarrel between two Sardinian shepherds (both performed by De André, using vari-speed and other effects to sound like two different people) over an inheritance dispute, which, according to Bubola's later recollections, De André actually witnessed at the time. Its title translates literally into "Lizards' den" but it is not in the lyrics, which however do feature the word zirichelti, i.e. lizards.
- "Parlando del naufragio della London Valour" ("Talking [about] the sinking of the London Valour") is about a shipwreck in April 1970 when a gale drove a British cargo ship, SS London Valour, onto the harbour mole at Genoa with the loss of 20 lives. However, De André refrains from recounting the actual shipwreck and instead uses it as a metaphor for the "normalization" process within Italy in 1977-'78, caused by the failure of armed protest groups, especially the Red Brigades, after the kidnapping and murder of Aldo Moro. The lyrics also include cynical portraits of various characters, who may or may not be identified with actual people. The same drastic changes in Italian ideologies would also be the main subject of a later song, "La domenica delle salme" [i.e. "Corpses Sunday", with a pun on Palm Sunday], within the 1990 album Le Nuvole.
- "Folaghe" ("Coots"), the album closer, is a quiet instrumental led by a twang guitar, intended to represent the placid motion of coots on a lake.

== Personnel ==
- Fabrizio De André - Guitars, Vocals
- Mario Battaini - Accordion
- Giuliano Bernardi - Mandolin
- Giuliano Bernicchi - Trumpet
- Virginio Bianchi - Ocarina and Bassoon
- Attilio Casiero - Mandolin
- Bruno Crovetto - Bass
- Tullio De Piscopo - Drums
- Lella Esposito - Voices
- Sergio Farina - Guitars
- Dori Ghezzi - Voices
- Vincenzo La Puma - Lyric tenor
- Riccardo Pellegrino - Violin
- Mario Pomarico - Ocarina and Bassoon
- Vanda Radicchi - Voices
- Gian Piero Reverberi - Keyboards
- Gilverto Zilioli - Guitars
- Marco Zoccheddu - Guitars
