= Fabrizio De André (album) =

Fabrizio De André (L'indiano)
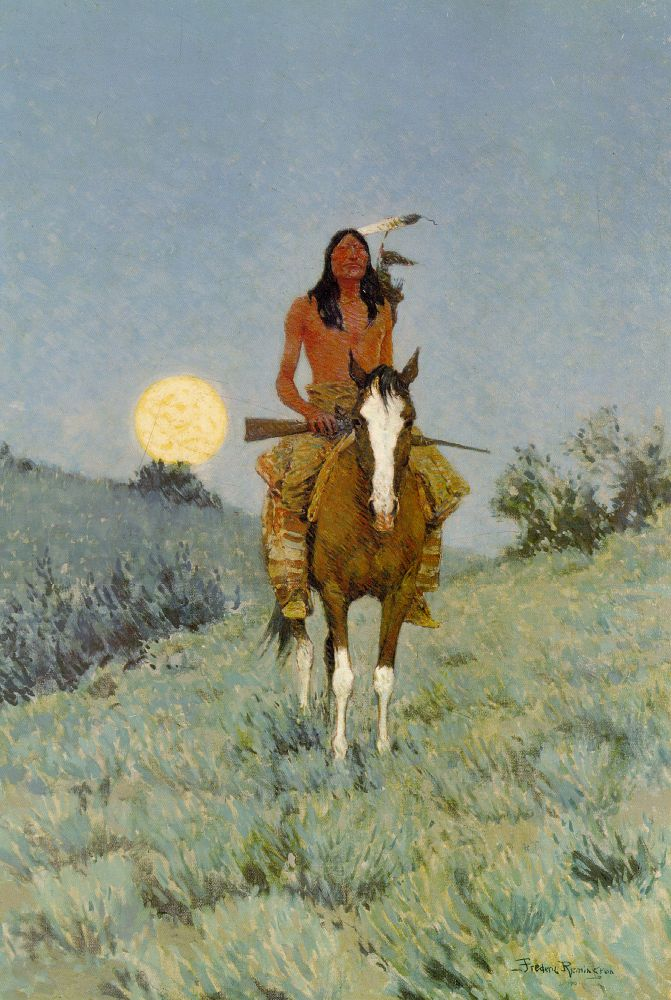

Studio album by Fabrizio De André
- Released: July 21, 1981
- Genre: Pop
- Length: 40:02
- Label: Ricordi
- Producer: Mark Harris, Oscar Prudente

Fabrizio De André chronology
Rimini (1978)	Fabrizio De André (L'indiano) (1981)	Crêuza de mä (1984)

Professional ratings
Review scores
Source	Rating
Allmusic	4.5/5 stars

Fabrizio De André is an album released by Italian singer-songwriter Fabrizio De André, in 1981. The songs were written by De André and Massimo Bubola. It is also known as L'Indiano (The Indian) due to the picture of a Native American on the cover. The picture is a painting by Frederic Remington named The Outlier. The title of the painting and its author are not credited on the cover – neither in the original pressing nor in any of the subsequent reprints of the album on CD or vinyl.

== Track listing ==
=== Side A ===
1. "Quello che non ho" – 5:51
2. "Canto del servo pastore" – 3:13
3. "Fiume Sand Creek" – 5:37
4. "Ave Maria" – 5:30

=== Side B ===
1. "Hotel Supramonte" – 4:32
2. "Franziska" – 5:30
3. "Se ti tagliassero a pezzetti" – 5:00
4. "Verdi pascoli" – 5:18

== Overview and songs ==
The album is a comparison of two apparently distant but nonetheless similar peoples who have both gone through colonization, the Sardinians and the Native Americans. It opens with the sounds of gunshots and people shouting from a bison hunting party, recorded in Sardinia especially for the album but intended to represent a hunting scene by Native Americans. These sounds also reappear in other sections through the album (the people involved in the hunting party are not credited). Also, the songs "Fiume Sand Creek", "Hotel Supramonte" and "Franziska" start with piano/keyboard introductions, musically unrelated to the songs themselves. The intro to "Hotel Supramonte" is freely based on "Summer '68" by Pink Floyd's Richard Wright (from Atom Heart Mother), deliberately inserted by keyboard player Mark Harris as a further Floydian reference, in addition to his arrangement for "Ave Maria" (see below).

- "Quello che non ho" ("What I haven't got") is an ironical blues song, where De André describes himself as lacking the possessions, benefits and advantages typically associated with wealthy people or upper classes in general, and ironically addresses an imaginary, hypothetical "you" who is the opposite of himself.
- "Canto del servo pastore" ("Shepherd Servant's Song") is a gentle, moderately-paced ballad about a shepherd's idyllic lifestyle.
- "Fiume Sand Creek" ("Sand Creek river") is a country & western song, including multiple (layered) acoustic guitars, percussion and male backing vocals, whose lyrics are a transfigured account of the Sand Creek massacre in 1864, seen from the point of view of one of the victims.
- "Ave Maria", a folk song from Sardinia based on a version of the Hail Mary prayer in the local language, was sung in a choral multi-tracked style by Connecticut-born keyboardist Mark Harris providing the higher vocals, and De André providing the lower ones. According to Harris's recollections within "L'anarchia" ["Anarchy"], the seventh DVD in the 2011 documentary series Dentro Faber ["Inside Faber"] about De André's life and work, the song was supposed to be sung by a group of tenores, a Sardinian polyphonic male choir, and Harris recorded a demo with his own voice to teach the song to the choir. However, when De André heard the demo, he was impressed by Harris's performance and told him: "Fuck it all, just sing this by yourself," also adding that he loved Harris's voice when it was strained. The final recording, with an instrumental arrangement inspired by Pink Floyd (particularly by their 1971 album Meddle), does indeed feature Harris's full-throated singing from the demo, which he jokingly referred to as "a highly unlikely vocal performance by an American singing a Sardinian song in Sardinian." Harris also explained that, although he is not really a Pink Floyd fan, he does own copies of Meddle and Atom Heart Mother, and that he played the albums for De André during the sessions, in response to the latter's request to find unusual, weird sounds.
- "Hotel Supramonte" refers to the kidnapping of De André and Dori Ghezzi in 1979 in the Supramonte area of Sardinia. As with other songs concerned with personal matters, De André's lyrics are not a direct account of the event or of its circumstances, but instead a metaphorically idealized, poetic vision of it through his own eyes. The singer addresses a woman and invites her to spend some time with him at the "Supramonte Hotel", in an attempt to regain some feelings of love – which he laments she has lost. De André sings the whole lyric in a sweet, quiet style, without any traces of sadness or – for that matter – of anger.
- "Franziska" is a Latin American-flavored song, set as a fast rumba at 130 BPM (almost a bachata). The lyrics are about a Spanish girl, a penniless unlucky suitor of hers (described alternately as a "bandit with no moon, no stars and no luck" and as a "forest sailor [i.e. not a seafaring man at all], without sleep and without songs") and a painter who, although nearly blind, is madly in love with her and morbidly jealous of everyone else.
- "Se ti tagliassero a pezzetti" ("If somebody cut you into little pieces") is, unusually for De André, a straightforwardly sentimental love song, addressing a nameless and possibly imaginary woman. (In the second-to-last verse, he calls her "Mrs. Liberty, Miss Fantasy"; in live performances, he changed the latter to "Miss Anarchy".) The title, inspired by Nick Mason's tongue-in-cheek vocal phrase ("One of these days I'm going to cut you into little pieces!") on Pink Floyd's "One of These Days", also from Meddle, is not meant to be understood literally, but just as ironically as Mason's utterance in Pink Floyd's experimental track. Indeed, the first two lines in De André's song are as follows: "If somebody cut you into little pieces / The wind would pick them all up and gather them." In one line, De André refers to himself as "Me, a guitar player; me, a violin player"; although the word "violin" was mainly chosen for rhyming purposes, De André did actually play both violin and guitar in his youth, starting on the former and then switching to the latter, and his son Cristiano is equally proficient on both.
- "Verdi pascoli" ("Green pastures") is a joyous, quasi-reggae song, including prominent keyboards, backing vocals and a short drum solo. Its lyrics, inspired by a book on Native American culture De André was reading at the time, are about a very stylized and non-religious representation of a happy afterlife, closer to Summerland or to the Native Americans' own "happy hunting ground" than to the Christian vision of Heaven.

== Personnel ==
The musicians playing on the album were all hand-picked by Mark Harris, who also took care of the arrangements. The line-up features, among others, top Italian session men such as Gabriele "Lele" Melotti, Pier Michelatti, Aldo Banfi and Massimo Luca, as well as De Andrè's wife Dori Ghezzi and co-producer Oscar Prudente on backing vocals.

- Fabrizio De André – Acoustic guitar in "Franziska" and "Hotel Supramonte", lead and backing vocals.
- Lele Melotti – Drum kit
- Pier Michelatti – Bass guitar
- Tony Soranno – Acoustic and electric guitars
- Mark Harris – Keyboards, synthesizers, lead vocals on "Ave Maria", backing vocals
- Aldo Banfi – Synthesizer
- Pietro Pellegrini – Oberheim OB-X
- Maurizio Preti – Percussion
- Andy J. Forest – Harmonica in "Quello che non-ho"
- Bruno Crovetto – Acoustic bass guitar in "Franziska" and "Hotel Supramonte"
- Paolo Donnarumma – Acoustic bass guitar in "Canto del servo pastore"
- Massimo Luca – Acoustic guitar in "Franziska"
- Claudio Bazzari – Electric guitar in "Se ti tagliassero a pezzetti" and "Canto del servo pastore"
- Sergio Almangano – Violin in "Hotel Supramonte"
- Cristiano De André – Plucked violin and hoopoe's call in "Fiume Sand Creek"
- Dori Ghezzi, Mara Pacini, Massimo Bubola, Oscar Prudente – Backing vocals
- Alessandro Colombini – Field recording [bison hunting party]
