= Massimo Bubola =

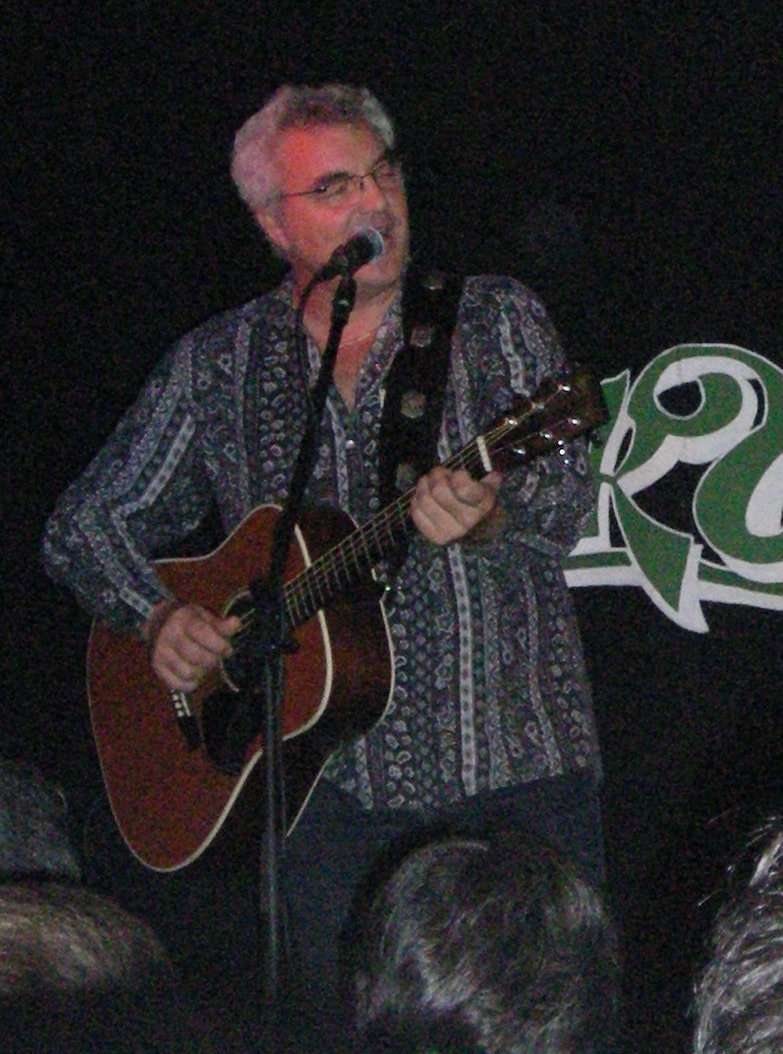
- Massimo Bubola at the "Folkclub" of Turin (October 2008)

Background information
- Born: 15 March 1954
- Origin: Terrazzo, Italy
- Genres: Rock, Folk rock
- Occupation: Singer-songwriter
- Instrument(s): Vocals, guitar
- Years active: 1976 – today
- Labels: Philips, Mercury, CGD, Dischi Ricordi, Fado, Produttori Associati, Eccher Music
- Website: Official website

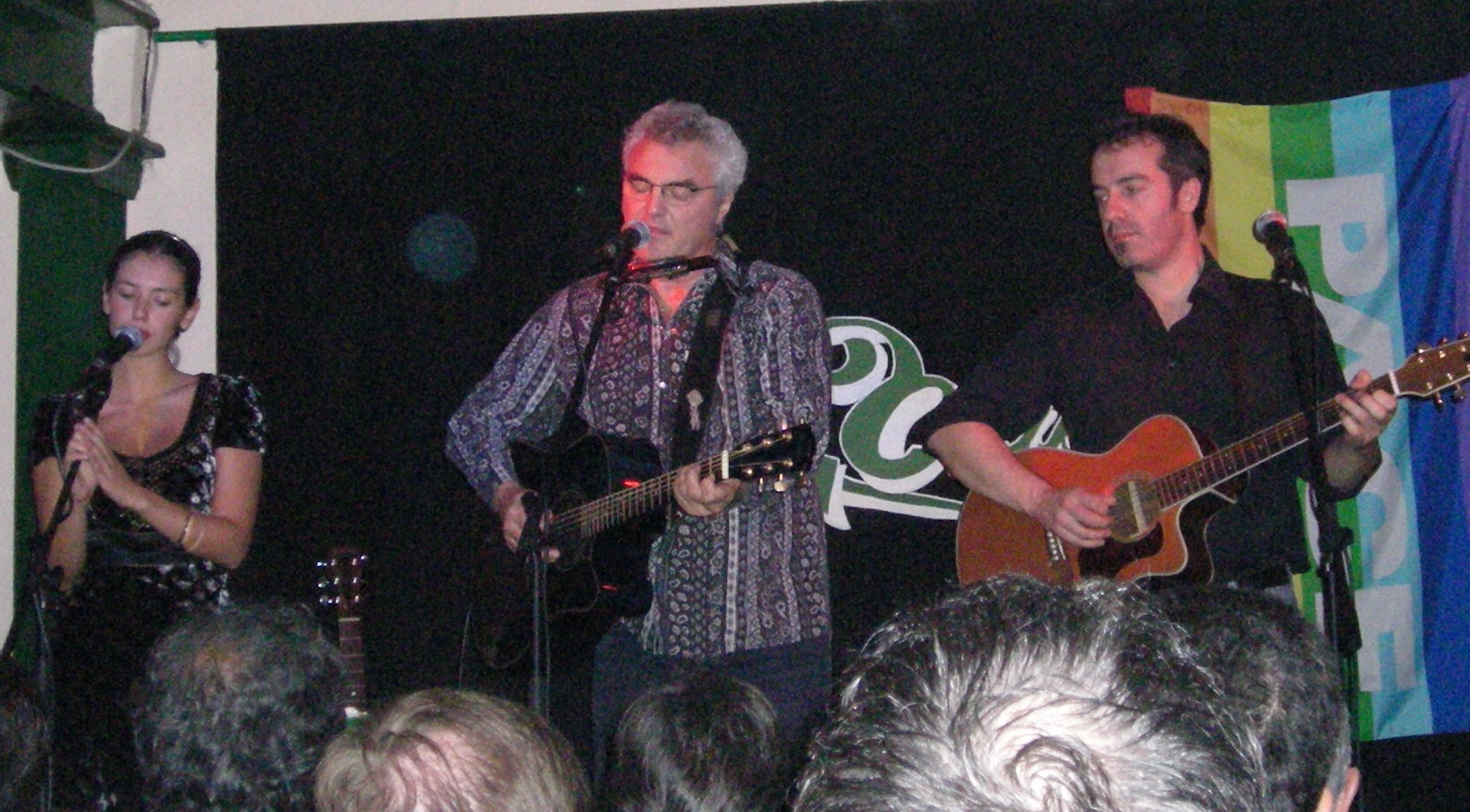
Massimo Bubola at the "Folkclub" of Turin in 2008 with Erika Ardemagni and Simone Chivilò.

Massimo Bubola (15 March 1954) is an Italian singer-songwriter, record producer and arranger.

During his career, he cooperated with lot of Italian musicians in writing lyrics and musics, and his most significant cooperation was with Fabrizio De André. As author, Bubola cooperated also with Milva, the Gang, Mauro Pagani, Fiorella Mannoia, Cristiano De André, Kaballà and Grazia Di Michele.

== Biography and career ==
Born in Terrazzo, a commune in the Province of Verona, he started writing songs very young. After the interest of the record producer Antonio Casetta, in 1976 he published his first album Nastro giallo (yellow ribbon). In 1978 Bubola started his cooperation with Fabrizio De André, writing with him the lyrics of the album Rimini and, in 1981, of the album Fabrizio De André.

In his third album Tre rose, published in 1981, Bubola received the cooperation of Fabrizio De André as artistic producer, Dori Ghezzi and Cristiano De André as chorister and Mauro Pagani as flute singer.

As well as his cooperation with several musicians, he continued writing lyrics for his albums, publishing Massimo Bubola in 1982 and Vita, morte e miracoli in 1989. Amore e guerra, published in 1996, is an anthology in which Bubola performs some songs of De André, Fiorella Mannoia and of the Gang.

His first live album, Il cavaliere elettrico, was published in 3 volumes in 2001, 2002 and 2004. Quel lungo treno, published in 2005, is a concept album based on First World War and dedicated to his great uncles, who died during the conflict. His latest album, In alto i cuori, with 11 new songs, was published on 22 January 2013.

== Discography ==
- Nastro giallo (1976)
- Marabel (1979)
- Tre rose (1981)
- Massimo Bubola (1982)
- Vita, morte e miracoli (1989)
- Doppio lungo addio (1994)
- Amore e guerra (1996)
- Mon trésor (1997)
- Diavoli e farfalle (1999)
- Giorni dispari (2001)
- Il cavaliere elettrico (2001, 2002, 2004)
- Niente passa invano - Concerti 1997/2002 (2003)
- Segreti trasparenti (2004)
- Quel lungo treno (2005)
- Neve sugli aranci (2007)
- Marabel (2008)
- Ballate di terra & d'acqua (2008)
- Dall'altra parte del vento (2008)
- Chupadero! (2009)
- Romagna nostra (2010)
- In alto i cuori (2013)

== Literature ==
- Marzio Angiolani: "Massimo Bubola – Viaggiando con zingari o re". Editrice Zona, 2001 – ISBN 88-87578-26-5
- Matteo Strukul: "Il cavaliere elettrico". Meridiano Zero, 2008 – ISBN 978-88-8237-170-8
