= Produttori Associati =

Italian record label

- Founded: 1970
- Genre: Pop music
- Country of origin: Italy

Produttori Associati was an Italian independent record label created in 1970 by Antonio Casetta, when Bluebell Records, Mini Rec, and Belldisc of the Belldisc S.p.A. group, fused. The label was active until 1977.

The company also owned Pausa Records in the United States, a label mostly known for Jazz recordings.
