= Anime salve =

Studio album by Fabrizio De André
- Released: September 19, 1996
- Genre: Folk, world
- Length: 46:25
- Label: Ricordi; BMG
- Producer: Fabrizio De André; Piero Milesi

Fabrizio De André chronology
Le nuvole (1990)	Anime salve (1996)

Professional ratings
Review scores
Source	Rating
Allmusic	4/5 stars

Anime salve is the final album released by Italian singer/songwriter Fabrizio De André in 1996. It was written together with fellow Genoan Ivano Fossati. In a 2011 interview within the DVD documentary series Dentro Faber [i.e. Inside Faber] about De André's life and works, Fossati stated that he and De André composed all the music for the album by actually playing together in the latter's country house in Sardinia, working on almost-complete lyrics by De André, to which Fossati added a few lines. He is featured as a guest singer on the title track and on "Â cúmba" (which features De André and Fossati respectively as "the suitor" and "the father"). Fossati also guested in some of De André's live shows from the era, where he was introduced by the latter as "a great guy with two huge defects: he's a friend of mine, and a Sampdoria supporter."

== Track listing ==
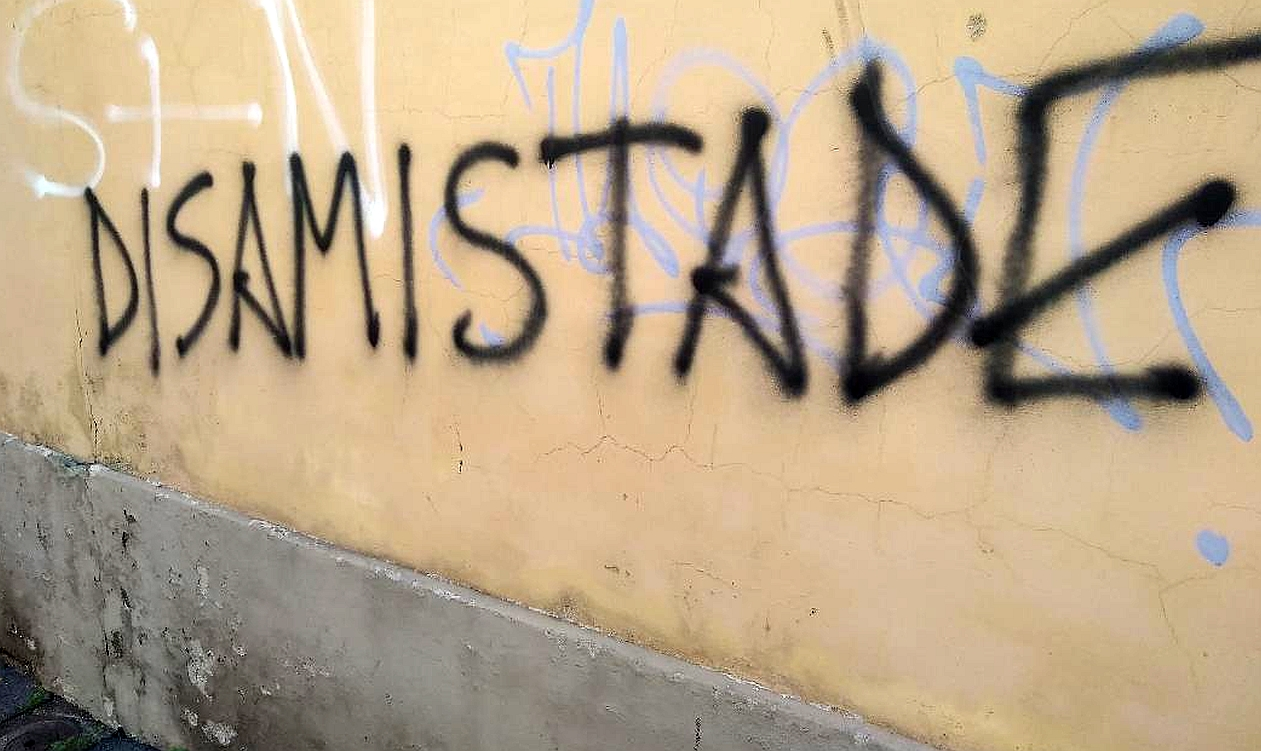
"DISAMISTADE": graffiti in Turin

1. "Princesa" (4:52)
2. "Khorakhané" (5:32)
3. "Anime salve" (5:52)
4. "Dolcenera" (4:59)
5. "Le acciughe fanno il pallone" (4:47)
6. "Disamistade" (5:13)
7. "Â cúmba" (4:03)
8. "Ho visto Nina volare" (3:58)
9. "Smisurata preghiera" (7:08)

All songs written by Fabrizio De André and Ivano Fossati, except for the original Spanish lyrics to "Smisurata preghiera", written (as "Desmedida plegaria") by Álvaro Mutis and Fabrizio De André.

=== Vinyl version ===
Anime salve was the only album in De André's discography not to have a vinyl edition when originally released - it was issued on CD and cassette. It was released on vinyl only in 2018, as the third-to-last issue of Corriere della Sera and De Agostini's Fabrizio De André Vinyl Collection, which includes all of De André's studio albums and all of the extant live recordings from his eight concert tours (many of which, although previously issued on CD as part of Sony Music's 2012 box set I concerti, were also released on vinyl for the first time). Because of the physical space occupied by the various tracks on the two sides of the record, the tracklist on the vinyl version is different from the CD (as above):

==== Side A ====
1. "Princesa"
2. "Ho visto Nina volare"
3. "Anime salve"
4. "Dolcenera"
5. "Le acciughe fanno il pallone"

==== Side B ====
1. "Khorakhané"
2. "Â cúmba"
3. "Disamistade"
4. "Smisurata preghiera"

== Overview ==
The album, released after six years of studies, shows marked influences of Latin-American music, as well as Eastern-European and Mediterranean ones (the latter deriving from the original project, which De André had begun with Mauro Pagani). Most of the lyrics deal with the theme of solitude and diversity, often considered as a positive, free state of life: the Brazilian transsexual immigrant ("Princesa"), the Romani people ("Khorakhanè"), the poor anchovy fisher ("Le acciughe fanno il pallone"), the man in love ("Dolcenera"). The title itself, though generally translated as "Saved souls", etymologically means "Solitary spirits".

Starting from late 1997, De André undertook an extensive tour of Italy to promote both this album and the later collection Mi innamoravo di tutto ["I used to fall in love with everything", a line from his 1978 song "Coda di Lupo"], which focused on his earlier work. The tour went on until 13 August 1998, when De André was forced to interrupt it because of his failing health. Two shows in the tour, held at Teatro Brancaccio in Rome on February 13 and 14, 1998, were filmed for RAI and released on DVD in 2004, as Fabrizio De André in Concerto - the very last filmed testimony of his live activity.

== The songs ==
- "Princesa" ["Princess" in Portuguese] is an accordion-led folk song whose rhythm, halfway between a milonga and a Portuguese fado, is carried forward by De André's fast delivery of witty, pointed lyrics, which are partly based on, and feature a number of excerpts from, Brazilian transsexual model Fernanda Farias de Albuquerque's 1995 autobiography (co-written with journalist and former Red Brigades criminal Maurizio Jannelli), also titled "Princesa" after a nickname of hers. The song narrates her youth and her failed early attempts at gender transitioning, then goes on to narrate a series of mostly true events. However, the last verse of the song features a "happy ending", with Princesa feeling contented about being in a stable relationship with a wealthy lawyer from Milan, which does not match real life at all: Farias never fully completed her male-to-female transition, and committed suicide in 1999. After the last verse, the coda of the song features a long list of words in Brazilian Portuguese, sung by a male/female choir (including two transsexuals) over a prominent Brazilian percussion background, representing Princesa's childhood.
- Subtitled "A forza di essere vento" ("By virtue of being wind"), "Khorakhané" is a soft, slow-paced song named after the Muslim Romani people of Bosnia and Montenegro and consisting in a concise recapitulation of their history. It features a poetical ending sung by Dori Ghezzi in a quasi-operatic style, whose lyrics, a metaphorical expression of a quest for freedom, were written by De André and translated into Sinte Romani by Roma poet and writer Giorgio Bezzecchi, a friend of his.
- "Anime salve", a duet with Ivano Fossati which includes prominent synths and a more contemporary-sounding arrangement in comparison to other acoustic-oriented tracks on the album, is a thoughtful ballad about solitude. Coming after two tracks whose protagonists experienced solitude as being imposed on them by external circumstances, Fossati meant this song to be a hymn to solitude as a choice that can save one's soul from the worst human failings, solitude as a counterbalance to living in the world, a solitude that gives space for better understanding, learning and reflection about the world, a solitude that counters the tendencies towards violence that result from people banding together and identifying as a group, both at the local/social level and at the level of political states. De André's and Fossati's vocals complement each other throughout the track, finishing and continuing each other's vocal lines; although they never met each other during the recording of the album, they did perform the song as a duet during the subsequent live tour.
- "Dolcenera" [literally "Sweetblack" - referring to flooding water] is a musical counterpart to "Â duménega" from Crêuza de mä and "Don Raffaè" from Le nuvole: a sprung, slightly irregular but metrically clear tarantella rhythm, punctuated by acoustic guitars and accordions. It is spatially and temporally set during the October 8, 1970 flood in Genoa, and its lyrics, freely based on newspaper accounts from the era, are about a man who is trying to organize a clandestine meeting with his mistress (a married woman); however, she gets stuck in a tram carriage which is separated from the rest of the tram because of the flood, and the planned meeting never happens. The lyrics also feature lines sung in Genoese dialect, which express the man's thoughts. Apulian singer-songwriter Dolcenera (a.k.a. Emanuela Trane) chose her stage name after this song; she and Lucio Fabbri from PFM, her first producer, were inspired by her moody looks - she dressed almost exclusively in black during her early career - and by the dark-sounding lyrics to her first compositions.
- "Le acciughe fanno il pallone" ["The anchovies make a ball"] is a song about fishermen, focusing on the hardships of their work. Its title derives from a phenomenon, often happening on the Ligurian coast, where anchovies, pursued by bluefish, run by the thousands toward the surface, and, in doing so, defend themselves by gathering up into a glittering ball. The lyrics to the song are about another kind of solitude, due in this case to poverty. The hard-working fisherman is in competition with a tuna for the anchovies he fishes for, and faces an uncertain market demand onshore for his catch even then. He can only dream of catching a golden fish that would improve his circumstances and allow him to marry. Musically, the song is a moderately-paced samba; the musical tag at the end, though, is a wonderful example of the multicultural influences on the album - a middle-Eastern shehnai playing over an African-inspired bed of rhythm, along with a Cuban tumbao in the bass.
- "Disamistade", as the title says [literally "Unfriendship" in Sardinian, but here intended as feud], deals with a feud between two families in rural Sardinia. De André describes them as having no real animosity between each other and desperately making attempts to reconcile, or maybe just to come to terms with the situation - even if they know that all of their attempts will eventually come to either a bloodshed or to nothing at all because of a century-old grudge, so strong and powerful that no-one is able to dissipate it. This is narrated by De André in a deliberately resigned style over a slow, dirge-like march, marked by the metallic, almost ominous clangs of a Brazilian berimbau, a musical bow featuring a single metal string over an emptied gourd. The singer marks the end of every verse with nonsense words ('ndea-oh, 'ndea-oh), vaguely sounding like Sardinian but not belonging to that language. A faithful English-language cover of the song was released in 2000 by the American indie folk band The Walkabouts, who included it on their album Train Leaves at Eight.
- The whole of "Â cúmba" (music and lyrics) is based on a traditional Genoese call-and-response rhyme from the 1800s, and it is entirely sung in Genoese by De André (as "the father"), Fossati (as "the suitor") and a female choir, representing the townspeople. The lyrics are an excited dialogue between the two males, arguing over the elder man's daughter - the "cúmba" of the title, literally translatable as "the dove" and meant as a yet-unmarried girl.
- "Ho visto Nina volare" ["I saw Nina flying"] is a sensitive, sweet ballad about a distant past. It is based on the recollections of Giovanna "Nina" Manfieri, a childhood friend of De André's who she first met in 1942, when both of them were two, and with whom she spent her entire childhood. The lyrics, written from a child's point of view, are about the singer's longing to grow up and become independent from his elders, while simultaneously being fearful of the unknown.
- "Smisurata preghiera" ["Limitless prayer"], the album closer, is built as a sea shanty, but musically stronger than the usual examples of the genre. Its subject matter is, yet again, sailors - here described as a race of their own, proudly standing above a generalized, faceless "majority" and obstinately going their own way, against the tide of the mainstream culture; De André would include in this special "mix" all marginalized people - the poor, social outcasts, rebels of many stripes and, indeed, sailors. The song is inspired by and partly based on poems within short stories by Álvaro Mutis - especially from his 1993 collection "The Adventures and Misadventures of Maqroll". (Mutis later became De André's friend.) The lines "for the one who travels in a stubborn and opposite direction, / with his special mark of special desperation" sum up the entire album's poetical stance, as well as much of De Andrè's work. The lyrics to the song were originally written in Colombian Spanish by De André, who condensed several passages from poems by Mutis into a consistent whole; the singer also recorded a Colombian Spanish demo of the song, which was given to Mutis from De André as a gift and never officially released in full (an excerpt from it is featured in the second DVD in the Dentro Faber series). He was taught the correct South American pronunciation by noted Italian-Argentinian film score composer Luis Bacalov. The lyrics to the album version are literally translated from the original Spanish lyrics. After De André finishes singing, the song concludes with a 90-second orchestral coda in free time, arranged by Piero Milesi.

== Personnel ==
The album features De André's full backing band from his live shows at the time, which includes ethnic music specialist Mario Arcari, guitarist Michele Ascolese and drummer Ellade Bandini, as well as his wife Dori Ghezzi and their daughter Luvi De André on vocals. Percussionist Giuseppe "Naco" Bonaccorso, who is also prominently featured, was tragically killed in a car accident in June 1996, shortly after completing his parts on the album.

=== "Princesa" ===
- Fabrizio De André - Main vocal
- Ellade Bandini - Drum kit
- Naco - Wood block, zabumba, shaker, double triangle, spring, djembe, bongo and conga
- Pier Michelatti - Bass guitar
- Michele Ascolese - Classical guitar
- Massimo Gatti - Mandolin and mandola
- Sàndor Kuti - Cimbalom
- Vladimir Denissénkov - Bayan
- Giancarlo Porro - Clarinet
- Piero Milesi - Cello
- Dori Ghezzi, Luvi De André, Silvia Paggi, Beppe Gemelli, Robson R. Primo (Agata), Roberto Esteráo (Roberta) - Vocals (Note: the last two names in the list belong to Brazilian transsexuals.)
- Neusinha Escorel, Patricia Figueredo, Rosa Emilia - Spoken vocals
- Tiziano Crotti and Paolo Iafelice - Field recordings

=== "Khorakhané (A forza di essere vento)" ===
- Fabrizio De André - Vocals
- Michele Ascolese - Electric guitar
- Sàndor Kuti - Cimbalom
- Riccardo Tesi - Diatonic button accordion
- Piero Milesi - Keyboards
- "Il Quartettone" - String orchestra
- Carlo De Martini - Conductor
- Dori Ghezzi - Female vocals

=== Anime salve ===
- Fabrizio De André and Ivano Fossati - Vocal duet
- Ellade Bandini - Drum kit
- Naco - Darbuka, spring, conga and shaker
- Pier Michelatti - Bass guitar
- Alberto Tafuri - Piano and keyboards
- Mario Arcari - Launeddas and English horn
- Massimo Spinosa - Audio editing
- Tiziano Crotti and Paolo Iafelice - Field recordings

=== "Dolcenera" ===
- Fabrizio De André - Vocals, classical guitar
- Ellade Bandini - Drum kit
- Naco - Udu, berimbau and shaker
- Pier Michelatti - Bass guitar
- Gianni Coscia - Accordion
- Cecilia Chailly - Paraguayan harp
- Mario Arcari - English horn
- Michela Calabrese D'Agostino - Flute
- Giancarlo Porro - Clarinet
- Silvio Righini - Cello
- Dori Ghezzi, Luvi De André - Female vocals

=== "Le acciughe fanno il pallone" ===
- Fabrizio De André - Vocals
- Naco - Darbuka, conga, udu, talking drum, caxixi and wood block
- Pier Michelatti - Bass guitar
- Cristiano De André - Classical guitar, keyboards, violin and shaker
- Michela Calabrese D'Agostino - Flute
- Mario Arcari - Shehnai

=== "Disamistade" ===
- Fabrizio De André - Vocals, classical guitar
- Naco - Berimbau and tambourine
- Elio Rivagli - Jug
- Silvio Righini - Cello
- Piero Milesi - Keyboards
- Alberto Morelli - Tlapitzalli and bansuri
- "Il Quartettone" - String orchestra
- Carlo De Martini - Conductor

=== "Â cúmba" ===
- Fabrizio De André - Vocals, classical guitar
- Ivano Fossati - Duet vocals
- Ellade Bandini - Drum kit
- Naco - Rake (i.e. hitting and scraping the metal teeth on a rake with a wooden stick), caxixi, djembé, electrical wire gasket, gong, conga and shaker (Note: An uncredited vibraslap can also be heard among the other percussion instruments.)
- Pier Michelatti - Bass guitar
- Michele Ascolese - Classical guitar
- Dori Ghezzi, Luvi De André, Silvia Paggi - Female vocals

=== "Ho visto Nina volare" ===
- Fabrizio De André - Vocals, castanets and caxixi
- Ellade Bandini - Tom-tom drum
- Naco - Rattles
- Pier Michelatti - Bass guitar
- Francesco Saverio Porciello - Classical guitar
- Piero Milesi - Piano and keyboards
- Alberto Morelli - Bansuri
- Massimo Spinosa - Audio editing

=== "Smisurata preghiera" ===
- Fabrizio De André - Vocals
- Elio Rivagli - Drum kit
- Naco - Djembé, talking drum and shaker
- Alberto Tafuri - Piano and keyboards
- Pier Michelatti - Bass guitar
- Franco Mussida - Classical guitar
- Mario Arcari - Launeddas
- Riccardo Tesi - Diatonic button accordion
- "Il Quartettone" - String orchestra
- Carlo De Martini - Conductor

All tracks were arranged by Piero Milesi, who also wrote the orchestral arrangements.
