= In Concerto (DVD) =

Fabrizio De André in Concerto

Video by Fabrizio De André
- Released: April 2004
- Recorded: February 13–14, 1998; Teatro Brancaccio, Rome
- Genres: Folk, world music, rock
- Length: 180 min.
- Labels: BMG, Dischi Ricordi
- Directors: Mimma Nocelli, Pepi Morgia
- Producers: Dori Ghezzi, Marco Godano

Fabrizio De André in Concerto, also known as L'ultimo concerto ["The last concert"] or simply In Concerto, is a DVD and concert film by Italian singer-songwriter Fabrizio De André, chronicling two February 1998 shows at Teatro Brancaccio in Rome during his successful 1997–1998 Anime salve Italian tour, promoting his same-titled 1996 album. (The tour was quickly renamed The Tarot tour by Italian music journalists and reviewers, because of its peculiar set design.) The shows are De André's last filmed ones before his death in January 1999, although not his very last: the tour, indeed, lasted until August 1998, when De André had to stop it because of the first symptoms of a recurring illness, later diagnosed as lung cancer. The DVD, originally filmed as a TV broadcast on RAI, was directed by Mimma Nocelli and longtime De André collaborator Pepi Morgia, and produced by Dori Ghezzi, who released it in 2004 on her own label Nuvole Productions.

== Track listing ==
=== Act 1 ===
1. "Crêuza de mä" (De André [lyrics], De Andrè/Mauro Pagani [music])
2. "Jamin-a" (De André, De André/Pagani)
3. "Sidún" (De André, De André/Pagani)
4. "Prinçesa" (De André/Ivano Fossati; additional lyrics by Maurizio Jannelli)
5. "Khorakhané" (De André/Fossati)
6. "Anime salve" (De André/Fossati)
7. "Dolcenera" (De André/Fossati)
8. "Le acciughe fanno il pallone" (De Andrè/Fossati)
9. "Disamistade" (De André/Fossati)
10. "Â cúmba" (De André/Fossati)
11. "Ho visto Nina volare" (De André/Fossati)
12. "Smisurata preghiera" (De André/Fossati/Álvaro Mutis)
- Tracks 1–3 originally released on Crêuza de mä
- Tracks 4–12 originally released on Anime salve

=== Act 2 ===
1. "Nel bene e nel male" ["In good and in evil"] (Cristiano De André/Daniele Fossati) – performed by Cristiano De André
2. "Invincibili" ["Invincible"] (Cristiano De André/Massimo Bubola) – performed by Cristiano De André
3. "L'infanzia di Maria" (De André [lyrics], De André/Gian Piero Reverberi [music])
4. "Il ritorno di Giuseppe" (De André, De André/Reverberi)
5. "Il sogno di Maria" (De André, De André/Reverberi)
6. "Tre madri" (De André, De André/Reverberi)
7. "Il testamento di Tito" (De André [lyrics], De André/Corrado Castellari [music])
8. "La città vecchia" (De André; originally released as a single in 1965, re-made on Canzoni)
9. "Bocca di Rosa" (De André/Reverberi; originally released on Volume 1)
10. "Amico fragile" (De André; originally released on Volume 8)
11. "Fiume Sand Creek" (De André/Bubola; originally released on Fabrizio De André (1981), also known as L'Indiano)
12. "Il pescatore" (De André/Reverberi/Franco Zauli; originally released as a standalone single in 1970)
13. "Via del Campo" (De André/Enzo Jannacci; originally released on Volume 1)
14. "Geordie" (Traditional, adapted by De André; originally released as a single in 1966)
15. "Volta la carta" (De André/Bubola; originally released on Rimini)
- Track 1 originally released on Cristiano De André's 1995 album Sul confine.
- Track 2 originally released on Cristiano De André's 1992 album Canzoni con il naso lungo.
- Tracks 3–7 originally released on La buona novella

=== DVD special features ===
- "Fabrizio: talking about Crêuza de mä and Anime salve" – De André's spoken explanations of the musical and lyrical contents of the albums, presented as a separate feature in order not to disrupt the flow of the music.
- "Backstage: Fabrizio, Cristiano, Luvi" – Interviews with De André, his son and his daughter.
- "The band" – Excerpts from interviews with De André and the band members, also including rehearsal fragments.
- "Discography": a detailed discography, presented as animated CG listings.

== Overview ==
The show consists of two acts, set apart by their musical content. Act 1 starts with three songs from Crêuza de mä (the title track and, notably, the only two songs on the album which are not about Genoa), then De André goes on to perform the Anime salve album in its entirety and in order. Act 2, after an interlude by De André's firstborn son Cristiano, starts with five songs from La buona novella, after which De André performs a selection of his most popular songs, also including "Geordie" as a bonus. The show also features lengthy and detailed spoken introductions by De André about the main three albums that the setlist is based on. (On the DVD, two of these introductions are edited out of the main feature and presented as bonuses, as described above.) Because of the higher prominence given to past material, De André's second-to-last album Le nuvole is completely absent from the setlist of the show; "Don Raffaé", the most easily accessible track from that album and arguably its "greatest hit", was included in the setlist for the first leg of the 1997 tour, but, according to a comment by De André in the "Backstage" bonus feature, it was later dropped from the winter 1997 setlist and throughout 1998 in favour of "Bocca di Rosa" - which holds an even larger popularity among De André's fan base.

== Differences between live and studio versions ==
Several songs in the show were modified from their studio versions, either to compensate for the absence of musicians and performers who were featured on the respective studio albums, or for purely musical reasons.

=== Act 1 ===
- On "Crêuza de mä", De André appears not to sing at all during the eh anda (etc.) chorus, as he moves away from the microphone while the band members sing. However, he does play a bouzouki - unlike on the original studio album, where he did not play any instruments.
- On "Jamin-a", he adds an oud part.
- On "Sidún", he sits cross-legged on the stage floor and does not play. Again, his voice is not heard during the wordless vocalization section in the song.
- "Prinçesa" starts with a few guitar notes and a tapped count-in, in order to help De André start the song with its a cappella opening line.
- On "Khorakhané", after the first verse and in the middle of the fifth, drummer Ellade Bandini plays six short hits on a very small (5-inch) frame drum, in order to momentarily underline the slow waltz beat of the song. The same sound is also featured on the studio recording, but the instrument is not: indeed, as originally recorded, the sound belongs to a sample of a darbuka (originally played by percussionist Naco), added in post-production as a sound effect. The lyrical ending to the song is sung by De André's daughter Luvi, who takes her mother's place.
- "Anime salve" and, later, "Â cúmba" feature Cristiano De André singing Ivano Fossati's parts from the original album.
- On "Dolcenera", De André's classical guitar (which was the primary marker of the tarantella beat in the song, in its studio recording) is mixed lower than the other instruments; prominence is given instead to Michele Ascolese's charango, which he uses to play an adaption of Cecilia Chailly's Paraguayan harp part on the studio version. Also, the concluding lines of each half-verse, which are all featured as run-on lines on the studio version by means of editing, are sung separately by De André, who omits the repeated final word of each such line. (e.g. "Nera che non si vedeva da una vita intera, così dolcenera, nera" ["So black that you haven't seen it for a whole lifetime, so sweetblack, black"] – the word nera at the end of the line is omitted from the live performance.)
- On "Le acciughe fanno il pallone", the percussion tag at the end is much more prominent than on the studio version.
- On "Disamistade", percussionist Rosario Jermano plays the berimbau with a metal stick and a bottleneck slide, to change its pitch. The orchestration on the song, played by an actual chamber orchestra on the studio recording, is performed here on a synth by Mark Harris.
- On "Ho visto Nina volare", backing vocalist Danila Satragno plays caxixi and castanets, both of which were played by De André on the studio version.
- The calm orchestral passage which concludes "Smisurata preghiera" is, again, played on keyboards.

=== Act 2 ===
- During his interlude, Cristiano De André performs his solo numbers on his own, with an acoustic guitar and no band – except for a short solo on "Invincibili" by guitarist Giorgio Cordini.
- All songs from La buona novella, except for "Il testamento di Tito" (noted below), are played as very faithful live renditions of their studio counterparts. De André omits the spoken narration between songs and plays classical guitar throughout. He also sings the choral part in "L'infanzia di Maria" together with the band, although, as he did earlier in the show, he keeps himself slightly off-mic.
- On "Il ritorno di Giuseppe", the sitar part, originally performed on an actual sitar by Franco Mussida, is played by Cristiano De André on an electric sitar.
- "Il testamento di Tito" uses a rock arrangement, originally devised by Premiata Forneria Marconi, or PFM, for their successful 1979 tour with De André. Five more songs in the show ("Bocca di Rosa", "Amico fragile", "Il pescatore", "Via del Campo" and "Volta la carta") also use PFM's arrangements from the same tour.
- "La città vecchia" was arranged by Cristiano De André especially for this tour. The new arrangement eschews the ballroom-like mazurka beat of the original recording (although an accordion is still featured, played by Harris), and instead opts for a more jazz-oriented feel, with acoustic guitar, brushed drums and a plucked double bass.
- On "Fiume Sand Creek", ethnologist Mario Arcari plays an imitation of a hoopoe's call on ocarina. This part was played by Cristiano De André on the original studio recording, reportedly by whistling into his cupped hands.
- On "Il pescatore", similarly to the other choral parts in the show, De André moves away from the microphone during the "la-la-la" chorus, in order for his voice not to be heard loudly.
- One of PFM's instrumental melodies on "Via del Campo", originally played by Franco Mussida on one of his "treated" guitars, is here played on flute by vocalist Laura De Luca. In this live rendition, the rhythm track is notably more prominent than in PFM's 1979 version; the song is built on a 6/8 tempo at about 58 BPM, played with brushes by Bandini on a wooden box, and punctuated by Jermano on an udu and a tabla.
- On "Geordie", Luvi De André sings the female vocal part as a duet with her father. As Luvi revealed in the "Backstage" feature on the DVD, the song was included in the setlist in select shows to showcase her vocal talents – in spite of it being not as popular as the other "hits" included in the second act.
- On "Volta la carta", the high operatic note at the end (originally sung by a tenor), which was omitted from previous live performances, is back in – sung at the top of his voice by Harris.

== Personnel ==
The show features almost all of the musicians who played on Anime salve, most of which are regular members of De André's live backing band since 1991. The band also includes American-born keyboardist Mark Harris (who was a stable band member during the first half of the 1980s, but was later dismissed), Neapolitan session percussionist Rosario Jermano (replacing Giuseppe "Naco" Bonaccorso, who played on Anime salve and was tragically killed in a 1996 car crash) and both of De André's children – multi-instrumentalist Cristiano on violin, guitars and keyboards, and Luisa Vittoria, nicknamed "Luvi", as a female vocalist.

=== Musicians ===
- Fabrizio De André – Lead vocals, choral vocals (off-microphone), classical guitar, bouzouki, oud
- Cristiano De André – Classical guitar, acoustic guitar, bouzouki, oud, violin (bowed and plucked), electric sitar, keyboards, lead vocals on "Nel bene e nel male" and "Invincibili", duet vocals on "Anime salve" and "Â cúmba", backing vocals, Whistling on "Fiume Sand Creek"
- Ellade Bandini – Drums; bass drum and maracas on "Le acciughe fanno il pallone", jug on "Disamistade", tom-tom drum on "Ho visto Nina volare", backing vocals
- Stefano Cerri – Bass guitar, double bass
- Mario Arcari – Shehnai, bansuri, launeddas, ocarina, clarinet, alto saxophone, backing vocals
- Rosario Jermano – Bongos, congas, wood blocks, tambourines, shaker, maracas, crotales, berimbau, cabasa, caxixi, udu, darbuka, talking drum, tabla, rattles, vibraslap, mark tree, cimbalom, backing vocals
- Mark Harris – Music director, piano, keyboards, synthesizers, accordion, backing vocals, tenor voice on "Volta la carta"
- Michele Ascolese – Acoustic, classical and electric guitars, bouzouki, charango, backing vocals
- Giorgio Cordini – Acoustic, classical and electric guitars; mandolin, mandola, keyboards, backing vocals
- Luvi De André – Female vocals, co-lead vocals on "Khorakhané", duet vocals on "Geordie"
- Laura De Luca – Female vocals, flute
- Danila Satragno – Female vocals, accordion, keyboards, additional percussion

=== Production and crew ===
- TV director – Mimma Nocelli
- Theatrical live show director and lighting designer – Pepi Morgia
- Film editor – Cesare Pierleoni
- TV shoot – Invideo s.r.l
- Audio and lighting supplier – Milano Music Service: Gigi Belloni, Giovanni "Riccio" Colucci
- Lighting technicians – Giancarlo Toscani, Giovanni Pinna
- Electricians – Davide Ansaldi, Luigi Germinasi, Mario Guadalupi
- Grip – Stefano Micheletti
- Sound engineer – Giancarlo Pierozzi
- Stage assistants – Vincenzo Cinone, Massimo Sartirana, Massimo Dalle Molle

==== Audio production ====
- Mobile recording studio – White Mobile
- Recording engineers – Vanis Dandi, Sandro "Amek" Ferrari
- Recording assistant – Giancarlo Pierozzi
- Mixed by Paolo Iafelice at Officine Meccaniche Recording Studio, Milan
- Mixing engineer – Celeste Frigo
- Assistant engineer – Giordano Bruno

==== DVD production credits ====
- Produced by Dori Ghezzi and Marco Godano for Nuvole Productions and MG Produzioni
- Executive producer – Eliana Guerra
- 5.1 audio mixing – Toni Soddu for Ultracuto
- 5.1 audio mixed at Suono di Ripetta, Rome
- Pro Tools operator – Andrea Fabioni
- Mastered by Claudio Giussani at Nautilus Mastering, Milan
- Special features directed by Stefano Sollima
- Special features edited by Carlo Diomonti
- Audio post-production – Stefano Maccarelli
- Technical executive – Simone De Rossi
- Production assistant – Connie Godano
- Film editing assistant – Michele De Fabritiis
- Art director – Francesca Lucci
- Graphic designer – Cristiano Canestrelli
- DVD authoring – Digital Power
- Graphic set-up – Roberto Masala
- Cover photography – Reinhold Kohl
- Special thanks to Mariano Brastio for the Discography section

== Set design ==
The backdrop for the show, which always puts a greater emphasis on the music than on the visuals, is a house of cards made up of wood panels, each one decorated with a pasted-on, oil-on-paper and hugely blown up pictorial rendition of a "Major Arcana" card from a Marseilles Tarot deck; all the pictures are also vaguely similar to Pamela Colman Smith's well-known illustrations for the Rider–Waite deck, but with names in French. The backdrop was conceived and designed by Pepi Morgia, while graphic artist Paola Salvi (who previously painted the "perfect fakes" - i.e. faithful copies of famous paintings from various eras - for De André's 1992-93 tour) painted the actual pictures. As Morgia himself revealed in his 2009 photographic and textual memoir Tourbook, the design was inspired by a comment made to him by De André during the very fragmentary rehearsals for the show; according to the singer-songwriter, the entire show was like a house of cards, which was constantly on the verge of falling down, but, thanks to the musicians' talent, never actually did. He also compared the very ephemeral nature of a house of cards to the frailty of his own life. Morgia's first idea for the cards involved a traditional Neapolitan playing deck, but he changed his mind after Cristiano De André showed him the illustrations from a Marseilles deck which he had, and which Morgia deemed more visually interesting to look at; later on, some elements from the Rider–Waite deck were incorporated as well. Neither Morgia nor anybody else is credited for the set design, as, indeed, both the liner notes and the on-screen credits at the end of the DVD do not include any credits for "set design".

The photo book included with the 16-CD live anthology box set Fabrizio De André: I concerti [i.e. The concerts], released in 2012 by Sony Music, features four pages which include blueprints of the stage, clearly signed "Pepi Morgia" (detailing the locations of all the Tarot cards featured on stage), as well as De André's handwritten comments on the symbolic significance of the "house of cards" design.
