= Edith Grossman =

American translator (1936–2023)

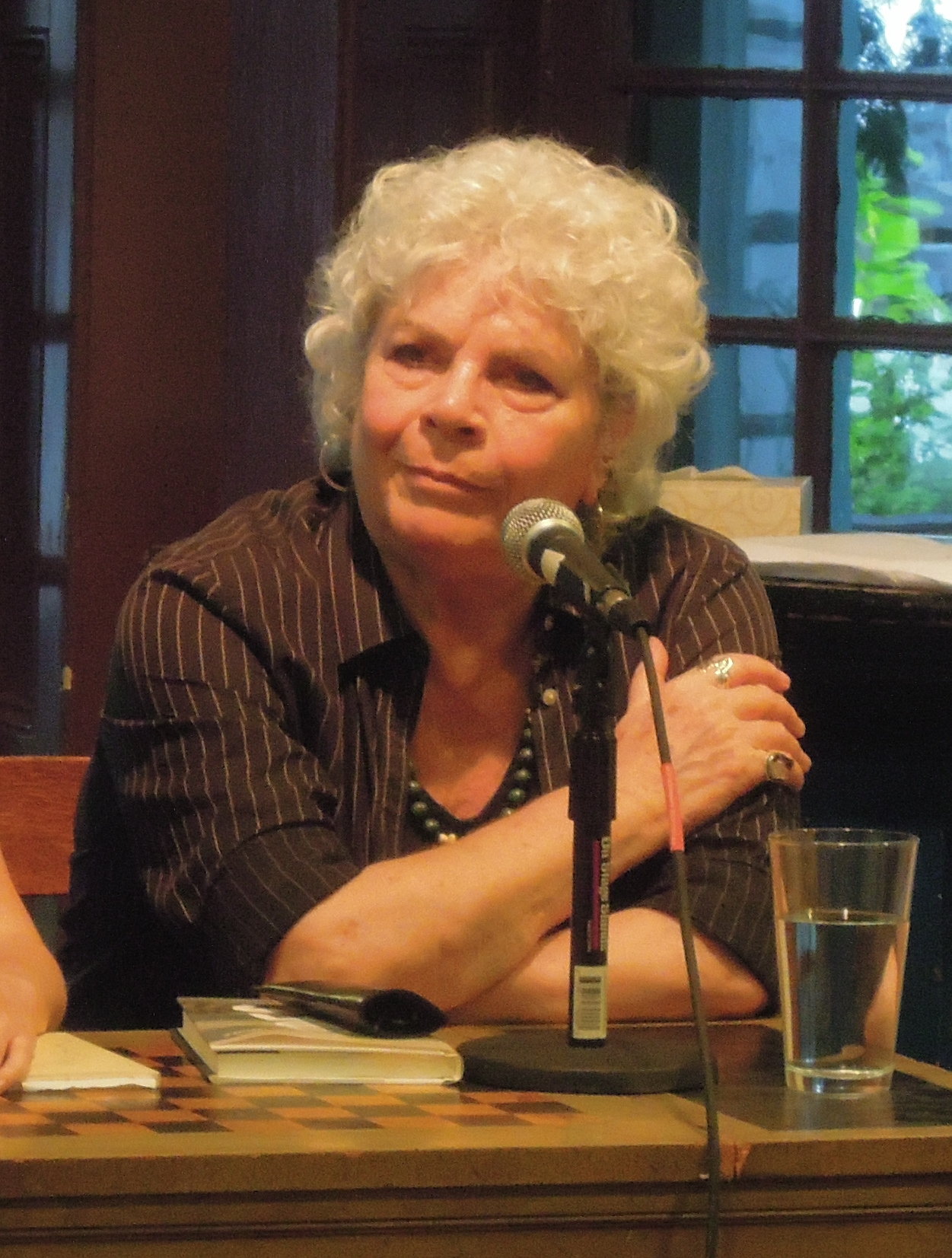
- Grossman in 2012
- Born: Edith Marion Dorph; March 22, 1936; Philadelphia, Pennsylvania, U.S.
- Died: September 4, 2023 (aged 87); New York City, U.S.
- Education: University of Pennsylvania (BA, MA); New York University (PhD)
- Occupation: Translator
- Spouse: Norman Grossman (m. 1965; div. 1984)
- Children: 2

Edith Marion Grossman (née Dorph; March 22, 1936 – September 4, 2023) was an American literary translator. Known for her work translating Latin American and Spanish literature to English, she translated the works of Nobel laureates Mario Vargas Llosa and Gabriel García Márquez, Mayra Montero, Augusto Monterroso, Jaime Manrique, Julián Ríos, Álvaro Mutis, and Miguel de Cervantes. She was a recipient of the PEN/Ralph Manheim Medal for Translation and the 2022 Thornton Wilder Prize for Translation.

== Biography ==
Born Edith Marion Dorph in Philadelphia, Pennsylvania, Grossman lived in New York City later in life. She received a B.A. and M.A. from the University of Pennsylvania, did graduate work at the University of California, Berkeley, and received a Ph.D. from New York University with a thesis on the Chilean "anti-poet" Nicanor Parra. She taught at NYU and Columbia University early in her career. Her career as a translator began in 1972 when a friend, Jo-Anne Engelbert, asked her to translate a story for a collection of short works by the Argentine avant-garde writer Macedonio Fernández. Grossman subsequently changed the focus of her work from scholarship and criticism to translation and, in 1990, left teaching to dedicate her energies full-time to translating.

Grossman was known to her friends as "Edie". She married Norman Grossman in 1965; the couple had two sons, but divorced in 1984. Edith Grossman died from pancreatic cancer at her home in Manhattan on September 4, 2023, at the age of 87.

== Translation work ==
In a speech delivered at the 2003 PEN Tribute to Gabriel García Márquez, she explained her method:

Fidelity is surely our highest aim, but a translation is not made with tracing paper. It is an act of critical interpretation. Let me insist on the obvious: Languages trail immense, individual histories behind them, and no two languages, with all their accretions of tradition and culture, ever dovetail perfectly. They can be linked by translation, as a photograph can link movement and stasis, but it is disingenuous to assume that either translation or photography, or acting for that matter, are representational in any narrow sense of the term. Fidelity is our noble purpose, but it does not have much, if anything, to do with what is called literal meaning. A translation can be faithful to tone and intention, to meaning. It can rarely be faithful to words or syntax, for these are peculiar to specific languages and are not transferable.

Grossman was notable for advocating that her name appear on the covers of the books she translated, alongside the author. Translators had traditionally been uncredited, which Grossman facetiously said implied that "a magic wand" had been waved to change the language of the text. In a 2019 interview, she said that "It's bloody well about time that the translator not be treated as a poor relation, that the translator is treated as an equal partner in the enterprise... Reviewers used to write as though translation had appeared through kind of a divine miracle. An immaculate conception!"

== Awards and recognition ==
Grossman's translation of Miguel de Cervantes's Don Quixote, published in 2003, is considered one of the finest English-language translations of the Spanish novel by some authors and critics, including Carlos Fuentes and Harold Bloom, who called her "the Glenn Gould of translators, because she, too, articulates every note." However, some Cervantes scholars have been more critical of her translation. Tom Lathrop, himself a translator of Don Quixote, critiqued her translation in the journal of the Cervantes Society of America, saying

Serious students of literature in translation should consider looking elsewhere for more faithful translations, such as Starkie and the discontinued and lamented Ormsby-Douglas-Jones version. There are just too many things that just are not right, or are confusing, in this translation.

Both Lathrop and Daniel Eisenberg criticized her for a poor choice of Spanish edition as source, leading to inaccuracies; Eisenberg added that "she is the most textually ignorant of the modern translators".

Grossman received the PEN/Ralph Manheim Medal for Translation in 2006. In 2008, she received the Arts and Letters Award in Literature awarded by the American Academy of Arts and Letters. In 2010, Grossman was awarded the Queen Sofia Spanish Institute Translation Prize for her 2008 translation of Antonio Muñoz Molina's A Manuscript of Ashes. In 2016, she received the Officer's Cross of the Order of Civil Merit awarded by King Felipe VI of Spain. The American Academy of Arts and Letters awarded her its Thornton Wilder Prize for translation in 2022.

In 1990, Gabriel García Márquez said that he preferred reading his own novels in their English translations by Grossman and Gregory Rabassa.

== Selected translations ==
Over a period of more than 40 years, Grossman translated around 60 books from Spanish, including:

Miguel de Cervantes:

- Don Quixote, Ecco/Harper Collins, 2003. ISBN 978-0060934347.
- Exemplary Novels, Yale University Press, 2016. ISBN 978-0300230536.

Gabriel García Márquez:

- Love in the Time of Cholera, Knopf, 1988. ISBN 978-0394561615.
- The General in His Labyrinth, Penguin, 1991. ISBN 978-0224030830.
- Strange Pilgrims, Knopf, 1993. ISBN 978-0679425663.
- Of Love and Other Demons, Knopf, 1995. ISBN 978-0679438533.
- News of a Kidnapping, Knopf, 1997. ISBN 978-0375400513.
- Living to Tell the Tale, Jonathan Cape, 2003. ISBN 978-1400041343.
- Memories of My Melancholy Whores, Vintage, 2005. ISBN 978-1400095940.

Mario Vargas Llosa:

- Death in the Andes, Farrar, Straus and Giroux, 1996. ISBN 978-0571175482.
- The Notebooks of Don Rigoberto, Farrar, Straus and Giroux, 1998. ISBN 978-0374223274.
- The Feast of the Goat, Picador, 2001. ISBN 978-0312420277.
- The Bad Girl, Farrar, Straus and Giroux, 2007. ISBN 978-0374182434.
- In Praise of Reading and Fiction: The Nobel Lecture, Farrar, Straus and Giroux, 2011. ISBN 978-0374175757.
- Dream of the Celt, Farrar, Straus and Giroux, 2012. ISBN 978-0374143466.
- The Discreet Hero, Farrar, Straus and Giroux, 2015. ISBN 978-0374146740.
- The Neighborhood, Farrar, Straus and Giroux, 2018. ISBN 978-0374155124.

Ariel Dorfman:

- Last Waltz in Santiago and Other Poems of Exile and Disappearance, Penguin, 1988. ISBN 978-0140586084.
- In Case of Fire in a Foreign Land: New and Collected Poems from Two Languages, Duke University Press, 2002. ISBN 978-0822329879.

Mayra Montero:

- In the Palm of Darkness, HarperCollins, 1997. ISBN 978-0060187033.
- The Messenger: A Novel, Harper Perennial, 2000. ISBN 978-0060929619.
- The Last Night I Spent With You, HarperCollins, 2000. ISBN 978-0060952907.
- The Red of His Shadow, HarperCollins, 2001. ISBN 978-0060952914.
- Dancing to "Almendra": A Novel, Farrar, Straus and Giroux, 2007. ISBN 978-0374102777.
- Captain of the Sleepers: A Novel, Picador, 2007. ISBN 978-0312425432.

Álvaro Mutis:

- The Adventures of Maqroll: Four Novellas, HarperCollins, 1995. ISBN 978-0060170042.
- The Adventures and Misadventures of Maqroll, NYRB Classics, 2002. ISBN 978-0940322912.

Other translations:

- José Luis Llovio-Menéndez, Insider: My Hidden Life as a Revolutionary in Cuba, Bantam Books, 1988. ISBN 978-0553051148.
- Augusto Monterroso, Complete Works and Other Stories, University of Texas Press, 1995. ISBN 978-0292751842.
- Julián Ríos, Loves That Bind, Knopf, 1998. ISBN 978-0375400582.
- Eliseo Alberto, Caracol Beach: A Novel, Vintage, 2001. ISBN 978-0375705069.
- Julián Ríos, Monstruary, Knopf, 2001. ISBN 978-0375408236.
- Pablo Bachelet, Gustavo Cisneros: The Pioneer, Planeta, 2004. ISBN 978-0974872483.
- Carmen Laforet, Nada: A Novel, The Modern Library, 2007. ISBN 978-0679643456.
- The Golden Age: Poems of the Spanish Renaissance, W. W. Norton, 2007. ISBN 978-0393329919.
- Antonio Muñoz Molina, A Manuscript of Ashes, Houghton Mifflin Harcourt, 2008. ISBN 978-0151014101.
- Luis de Góngora, The Solitudes, Penguin, 2011. ISBN 978-0143106388.
- Carlos Rojas, The Ingenious Gentleman and Poet Federico Garcia Lorca Ascends to Hell, Yale University Press, 2013. ISBN 978-0300167764.
- Sor Juana Inés de la Cruz, Selected Works, W. W. Norton, 2016. ISBN 978-0393351880.
- Carlos Rojas, The Valley of the Fallen, Yale University Press, 2018. ISBN 978-0300217964.

Essay:

- Why Translation Matters, Yale University Press, 2010. ISBN 978-0300126563.
