= The General in His Labyrinth =

1989 novel by Gabriel García Márquez

- First edition (Colombian)
- Author: Gabriel García Márquez
- Original title: El general en su laberinto
- Translator: Edith Grossman
- Language: Spanish
- Genre: Historical novel Dictator novel
- Publisher: 1989 (Editorial La Oveja Negra, in Spanish); 1990 (Alfred A. Knopf, in English)
- Publication place: Colombia
- Pages: 285 (English)
- ISBN: 958-06-0006-6 (Spanish); ISBN 0-394-58258-6 (English)

The General in His Labyrinth (original Spanish title: El general en su laberinto) is a 1989 dictator novel by Gabriel García Márquez. It is a semi-fictionalized account of the last seven months of Simón Bolívar, liberator and leader of Gran Colombia. The book traces Bolívar's final journey from Bogotá to the Caribbean coastline of Colombia in his attempt to leave South America for exile in Europe. Breaking with the traditional heroic portrayal of Bolívar El Libertador, García Márquez depicts a pathetic protagonist, a prematurely aged man who is physically ill and mentally exhausted. The story explores the labyrinth of Bolívar's life through the narrative of his memories, in which "despair, sickness, and death inevitably win out over love, health, and life".

Following the success of One Hundred Years of Solitude (1967) and Love in the Time of Cholera (1985), García Márquez decided to write about the "Great Liberator" after reading an unfinished novel by his friend Álvaro Mutis. He borrowed the setting—Bolívar's voyage down the Magdalena River in 1830—from Mutis. García Márquez spent two years researching the subject, encompassing the extensive memoirs of Bolívar's Irish aide-de-camp, Daniel Florencio O'Leary, as well as numerous other historical documents and consultations with academics.

Its mixture of genres makes The General in His Labyrinth difficult to classify, and commentators disagree over where it lies on the scale between novel and historical account. García Márquez's insertion of interpretive and fictionalized elements—some dealing with Bolívar's most intimate moments—initially caused outrage in parts of Latin America. Many prominent Latin American figures believed that the novel portrayed a negative image to the outside world of one of the region's most important historic figures. Others saw The General in His Labyrinth as a tonic for Latin American culture and a challenge to the region to deal with its problems.

== Background ==
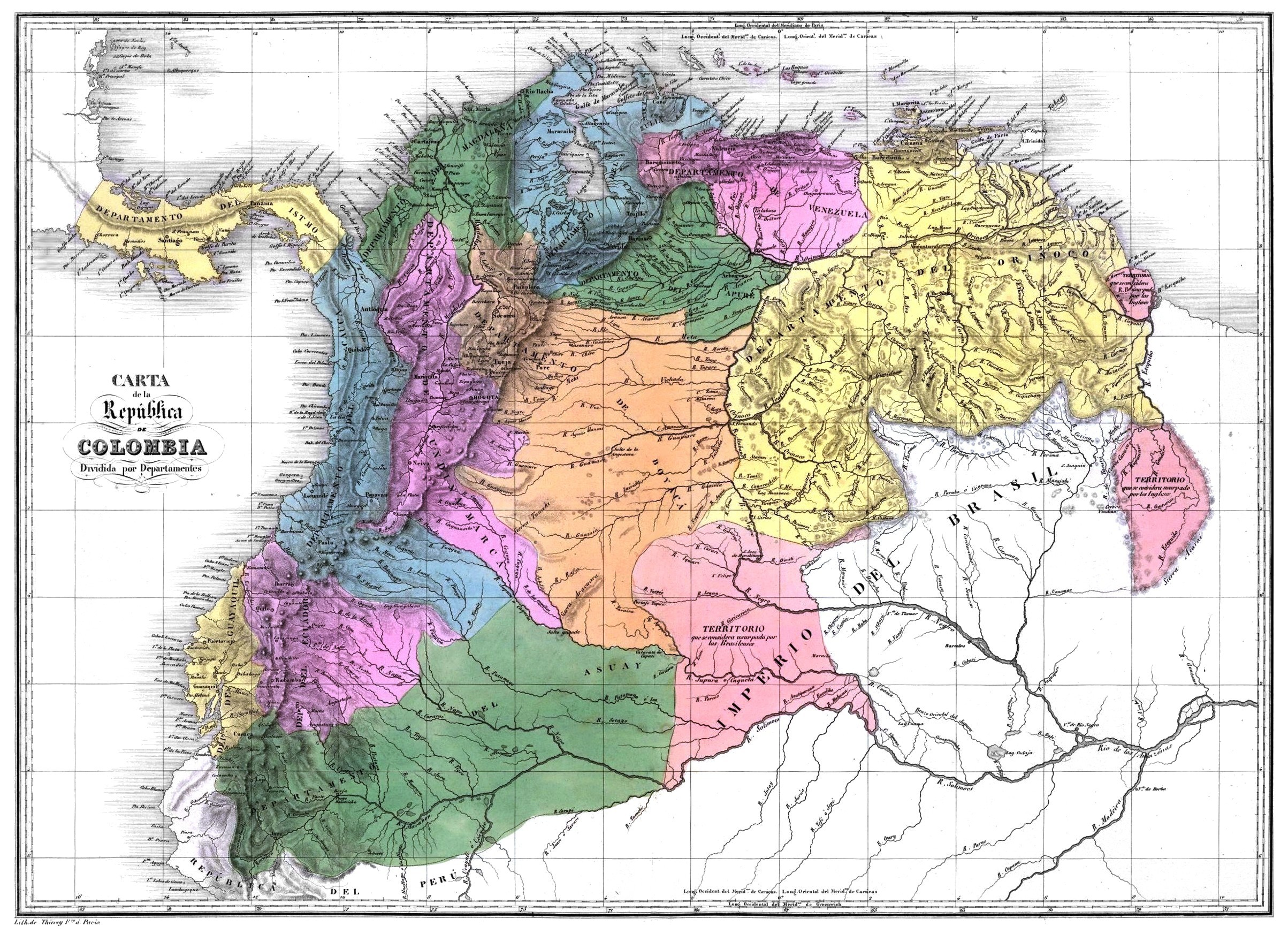
Gran Colombia, led by Simón Bolívar from 1819 to 1830, encompassed much of northern South America.

The initial idea to write a book about Simón Bolívar came to García Márquez through his friend and fellow Colombian writer Álvaro Mutis, to whom the book is dedicated. Mutis had started writing a book called El último rostro about Bolívar's final voyage along the Magdalena River, but never finished it. At the time, García Márquez was interested in writing about the Magdalena River because he knew the area intimately from his childhood. Two years after reading El último rostro, García Márquez asked Mutis for his permission to write a book on Bolívar's last voyage.

García Márquez believed that most of the information available on Bolívar was one-dimensional: "No one ever said in Bolívar's biographies that he sang or that he was constipated ... but historians don't say these things because they think they are not important." In the epilogue to the novel, García Márquez writes that he researched the book for two years; the task was difficult, both because of his lack of experience in conducting historical research, and the lack of documentary evidence for the events of the final period of Bolívar's life.

García Márquez researched a wide variety of historical documents, including Bolívar's letters, 19th-century newspapers, and Daniel Florencio O'Leary's 34 volumes of memoirs. He engaged the help of various experts, among them geographer Gladstone Oliva; historian and fellow Colombian Eugenio Gutiérrez Celys, who had co-written a book called Bolívar Día a Día with historian Fabio Puyo; and astronomer Jorge Perezdoval—García Márquez used an inventory drawn up by Perezdoval to describe which nights Bolívar spent under a full moon. García Márquez also worked closely with Antonio Bolívar Goyanes, a distant relative of Bolívar, during the extensive editing of the book.

=== Historical context ===
The novel is set in 1830, at the tail end of the initial campaign to secure Latin America's independence from Spain. Most of Spanish America had gained independence by this date; only Cuba and Puerto Rico remained under Spanish rule.

Within a few decades of Christopher Columbus's landing on the coast of what is now Venezuela in 1498, South America had been effectively conquered by Spain and Portugal. By the beginning of the 19th century, several factors affected Spain's control over its colonies: Napoleon's invasion of Spain in 1808, the abdication of Charles IV, Ferdinand VII's renouncement of his right to succeed, and the placement of Joseph Bonaparte on the Spanish throne. The colonies were virtually cut off from Spain, and the American and French Revolutions inspired many creoles—American-born descendants of Spanish settlers—to take advantage of Spanish weakness. As a result, Latin America was run by independent juntas and colonial self-governments.

The early 19th century saw the first attempts at securing liberation from Spain, which were led in northern South America by Bolívar. He and the independence movements won numerous battles in Venezuela, New Granada and present-day Ecuador and Peru. His dream of uniting the Spanish American nations under one central government was almost achieved. However, shortly after the South American colonies became independent of Spain, problems developed in the capitals, and civil wars were sparked in some provinces; Bolívar lost many of his supporters and fell ill. Opposition to his presidency continued to increase, and in 1830, after 11 years of rule, he resigned as president of Gran Colombia.

== Plot summary ==
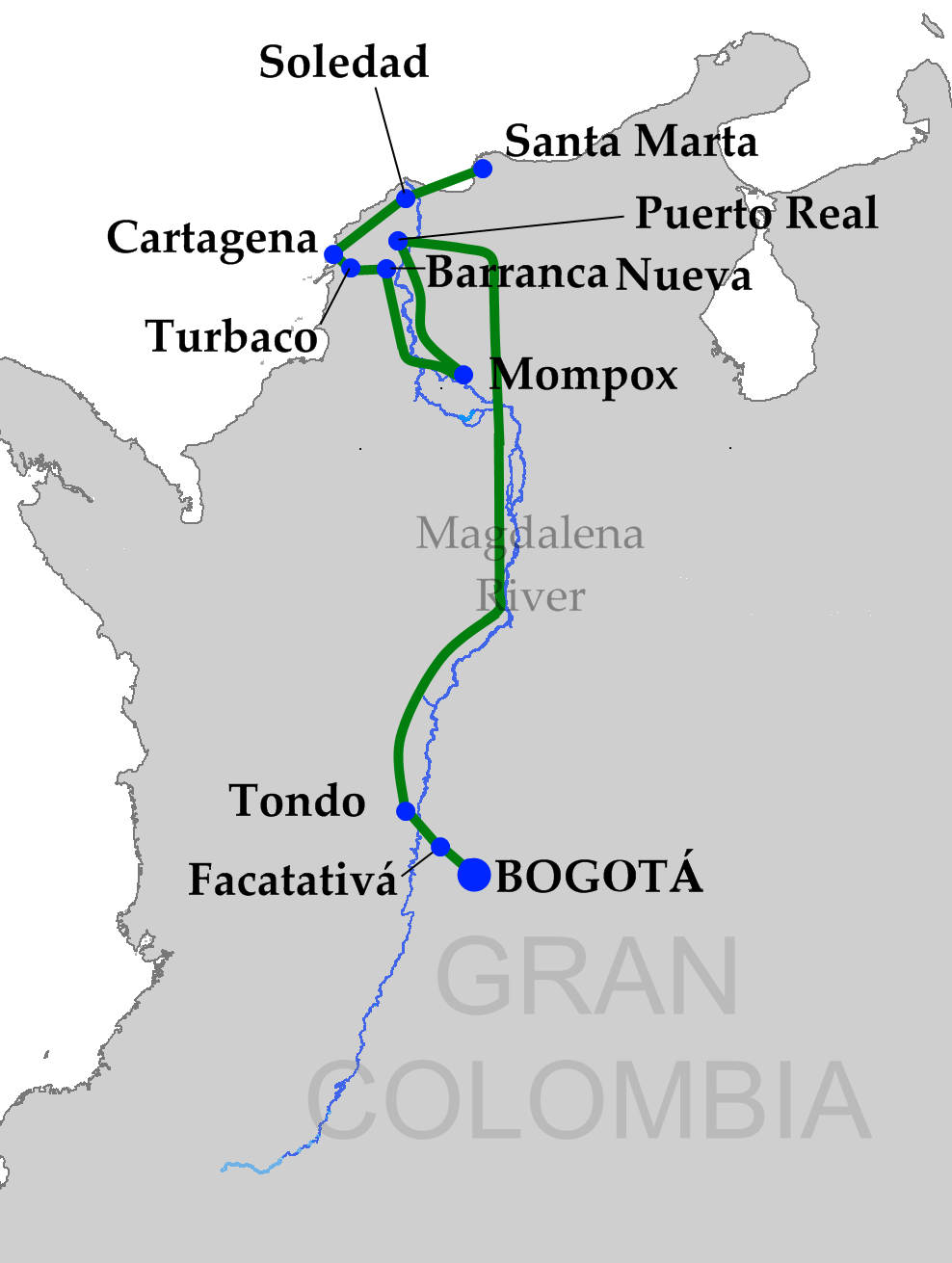
The journey taken by Simón Bolívar as described by García Márquez, starting at Santa Fe de Bogotá and ending with his death just outside Santa Marta.

The novel is written in the third-person with flashbacks to specific events in the life of Simón Bolívar, "the General". It begins on May 8, 1830, in Santa Fe de Bogotá. The General is preparing for his journey towards the port of Cartagena de Indias, intending to leave Colombia for Europe. Following his resignation as President of Gran Colombia, the people of the lands he liberated have now turned against him, scrawling anti-Bolívar graffiti and throwing waste at him. The General is anxious to move on, but has to remind the Vice-president-elect, General Domingo Caycedo, that he has yet to receive a valid passport to leave the country. The General leaves Bogotá with the few officials still faithful to him, including his confidante and aide-de-camp, José Palacios. At the end of the first chapter, the General is referred to by his full title, General Simón José Antonio de la Santísima Trinidad Bolívar y Palacios, for the only time in the novel.

On the first night of the voyage, the General stays at Facatativá with his entourage, which consists of José Palacios, five aides-de-camp, his clerks, and his dogs. Here, as throughout the journey that follows, the General's loss of prestige is evident; the downturn in his fortunes surprises even the General himself. His unidentified illness has led to his physical deterioration, which makes him unrecognizable, and his aide-de-camp is constantly mistaken for the Liberator.

After many delays, the General and his party arrive in Honda, where the Governor, Posada Gutiérrez, has arranged for three days of fiestas. On his last night in Honda, the General returns late to camp and finds one of his old friends, Miranda Lyndsay, waiting for him. The General recalls that fifteen years ago, she had learned of a plot against his life and had saved him. The following morning, the General begins the voyage down the Magdalena River. Both his physical debilitation and pride are evident as he negotiates the slope to the dock: he is in need of a sedan chair but refuses to use it. The group stays a night in Puerto Real, where the General claims he sees a woman singing during the night. His aides-de-camp and the watchman conduct a search, but they fail to uncover any sign of a woman having been in the vicinity.

The General and his entourage arrive at the port of Mompox. Here they are stopped by police, who fail to recognize the General. They ask for his passport, but he is unable to produce one. Eventually, the police discover his identity and escort him into the port. The people still believe him to be the President of Gran Colombia and prepare banquets in his honor; but these festivities are wasted on him due to his lack of strength and appetite. After several days, the General and his entourage set off for Turbaco.

The group spend a sleepless night in Barranca Nueva before they arrive in Turbaco. Their original plan was to continue to Cartagena the following day, but the General is informed that there is no available ship bound for Europe from the port and that his passport still has not arrived. While staying in the town, he receives a visit from General Mariano Montilla and a few other friends. The deterioration of his health becomes increasingly evident—one of his visitors describes his face as that of a dead man. In Turbaco, the General is joined by General Daniel Florencio O'Leary and receives news of ongoing political machinations: Joaquín Mosquera, appointed successor as President of Gran Colombia, has assumed power but his legitimacy is still contested by General Rafael Urdaneta. The General recalls that his "dream began to fall apart on the very day it was realized".

The General finally receives his passport, and two days later he sets off with his entourage for Cartagena and the coast, where more receptions are held in his honor. Throughout this time, he is surrounded by women but is too weak to engage in sexual relations. The General is deeply affected when he hears that his good friend and preferred successor for the presidency, Field Marshal Sucre, has been ambushed and assassinated.

The General is now told by one of his aides-de-camp that General Rafael Urdaneta has taken over the government in Bogotá, and there are reports of demonstrations and riots in support of a return to power by Bolívar. The General's group travel to the town of Soledad, where he stays for more than a month, his health declining further. In Soledad, the General agrees to see a physician for the first time.

The General never leaves South America. He finishes his journey in Santa Marta, too weak to continue and with only his doctor and his closest aides by his side. He dies in poverty, a shadow of the man who liberated much of the continent.

== Characters ==
=== The General ===
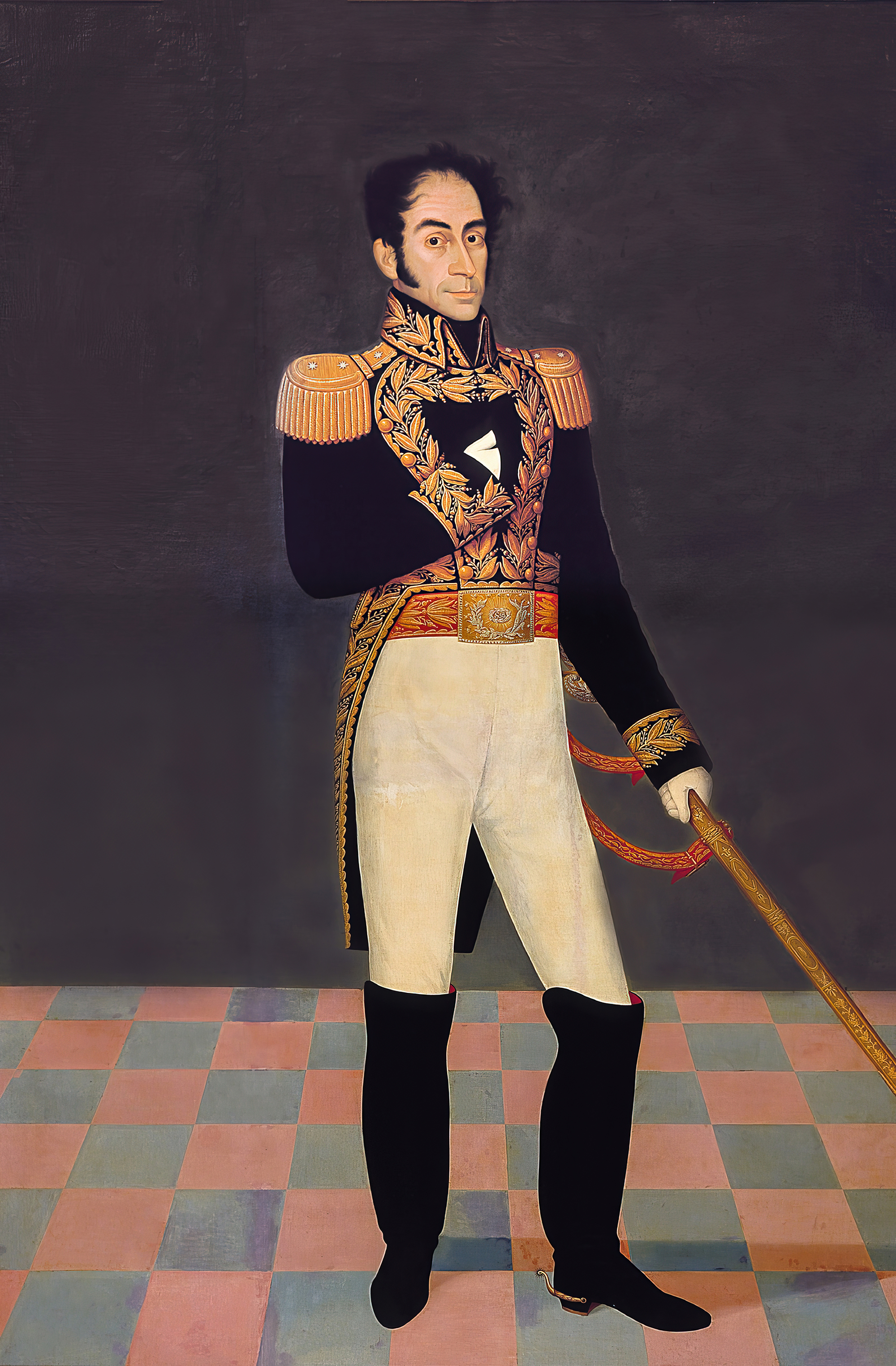
Simón Bolívar painted in 1825 by José Gil de Castro

The leading character in the novel is "the General", also called "the Liberator". García Márquez only once names his protagonist as Simón Bolívar, the famous historical figure, whose full title was General Simón José Antonio de la Santísima Trinidad Bolívar y Palacios, on whom the General's character is based. The novel's portrait of a national and Latin American hero, which challenges the historical record, provoked outrage in some quarters on its publication.

At the beginning of the novel, the General is 46 years old and slowly dying on his last journey to the port of Cartagena de Indias, where he plans to set sail for Europe. As Palencia-Roth notes, "Bolívar is cast here not only as a victim but as an agent of Latin America's tragic political flaws". The fortunes of the historical Simón Bolívar began to decline in 1824 after the victory of his general Antonio José de Sucre at Ayacucho. The novel draws on the fact that the historical Bolívar never remarried after the death of his wife, María Teresa Rodríguez del Toro y Alayza. García Márquez uses other documented facts as starting points for his fictional portrait of Bolívar–for example, his dedication to the army above all else, his premature aging, and his bad temper. Of the latter, Bolívar's aide-de-camp O'Leary once remarked that "his imperious and impatient temperament would never tolerate the smallest delay in the execution of an order".

In an interview with María Elvira Samper, García Márquez has admitted that his portrayal of Bolívar is partly a self-portrait. He identifies with Bolívar in many ways, since their method of controlling their anger is the same and their philosophical views are similar: neither "pays much attention to death, because that distracts one from the most important thing: what one does in life".

=== José Palacios ===
The novel begins with the name of José Palacios, who, here as with the historical figure of the same name, is Bolívar's "long-serving mayordomo". As literary critic Seymour Menton observes, Palacios's "total identification with Bolívar constitutes the novel's frame". Palacios constantly waits on the General, and at certain times he alone is allowed in the General's room. He has learned to live with his master's unpredictability and does not presume to read his thoughts. Simultaneously, however, Palacios is also the General's closest confidante, the person best able to read his moods and share in his emotions. Born a slave, the character is six years younger than the General, and has spent his entire life in his service. Throughout the novel, Palacios provides the General with clarifications or reminders of dates and events during the General's time of disillusion. According to one critic, Palacios's ability to recall past events in Bolívar's life is essential for García Márquez's recreation of the character, as it allows the Bolívar of official history to be placed within the context of everyday life.

=== Manuela Sáenz ===
Manuela Sáenz is the General's long-time lover, his last since the death of his wife, 27 years earlier. Her character is based on Simón Bolívar's historical mistress Doña Manuela Sáenz de Thorne, whom Bolívar dubbed "the liberator of the liberator" after she helped save him from an assassination attempt on the night of September 25, 1828. García Márquez's fictional portrait stimulated a reassessment of this historical figure, who is increasingly seen, according to Venezuelan historian Denzil Romero, "not just as a mistress but as the intelligent, independent, forceful woman she was". In the novel, she is described as "the bold Quiteña who loved him but was not going to follow him to his death". The General leaves Manuela Sáenz behind, but throughout the novel he writes to her on his journey. She also attempts to write letters to him with news of the political situation, but the mail carriers have been instructed not to accept her letters. Like the historical figure on whom she is based, the fictional Manuela Sáenz is married to Dr. James Thorne, an English physician twice her age. The historical Manuela Sáenz left Thorne after Bolívar wrote declaring his undying love for her. In the novel she is characterized as astute and indomitable, with "irresistible grace, a sense of power, and unbounded tenacity".

=== General Francisco de Paula Santander ===
As he reflects on the past, the General often thinks and dreams about his former friend Francisco de Paula Santander. The historical Francisco de Paula Santander was a friend of Simón Bolívar, but was later accused of complicity in a plot to assassinate him and sent into exile. In the novel, the General remembers that he had once appointed Santander to govern Colombia because he believed him to be an effective and brave soldier. He formerly regarded Santander as "[his] other self, and perhaps [his] better self", but by the time of the events in The General in His Labyrinth Santander has become the General's enemy and has been banished to Paris after his involvement in the assassination attempt. The General is depicted as tormented by the idea that Santander will return from his exile in France; he dreams, for example, that Santander is eating the pages of a book, that he is covered in cockroaches, and that he is plucking out his own eyeballs.

=== Field Marshal Antonio José de Sucre ===
Field Marshal Antonio José de Sucre is portrayed as an intimate friend of the General. The historical Antonio José de Sucre, the Field Marshal of Ayacucho, had been the most trusted general of Simón Bolívar. García Márquez describes him as "intelligent, methodical, shy, and superstitious". The Field Marshal is married to and has a daughter with Doña Mariana Carcelén. In the first chapter of the novel, the General asks Sucre to succeed him as President of the Republic, but he rejects the idea. One of the reasons Sucre gives is that he wishes only to live his life for his family. Also at the beginning of the novel, Sucre's death is foreshadowed. Sucre tells the General that he plans on celebrating the Feast of Saint Anthony in Quito with his family. When the General hears that Sucre has been assassinated in Berruecos on his way back to Quito, he vomits blood.

=== Minor characters ===
The novel revolves around the fictionalized figure of Bolívar and includes many minor characters who are part of the General's travelling party, whom he meets on his journey or who come to him in his memories and dreams of his past. Sometimes they are identified by particular quirks or tied to small but significant events. They include, for instance, General José María Carreño, a member of the entourage, whose right arm was amputated after a combat wound, and who once revealed a military secret by talking in his sleep. At other times, they are prostheses for the General's now failing powers: Fernando, for example, the General's nephew, is "the most willing and patient of the General's many clerks", and the General wakes him "at any hour to have him read aloud from a dull book or take notes on urgent extemporizations". One of the least developed of the minor characters is the General's wife, María Teresa Rodríguez del Toro y Alayza, who had died, readers are told, in mysterious circumstances shortly after their marriage. The General has "buried her at the bottom of a water-tight oblivion as a brutal means of living without her"; she only fleetingly enters his memories in the book's last chapter. According to Menton, she is "upstaged" by Manuela Sáenz, whose later history García Márquez recounts as if she instead were the General's widow. María Teresa's death, however, marked the General's "birth into history", and he has never tried to replace her.

== Major themes ==
=== Politics ===
In The General in His Labyrinth, García Márquez voices his political views through the character of the General. For example, Alvarez Borland points out that in the scene where the General responds to the French diplomat, his words closely reflect García Márquez's 1982 Nobel Address. The diplomat is critical of the barbarism in Latin America and the brutal means used in attempting to achieve independence. Bolívar replies by pointing out that Europe had centuries to progress to its current state, and that South America should be left to experience its "Middle Ages in peace". Similarly García Márquez remarks in his Nobel Speech that "venerable Europe would perhaps be more perceptive if it tried to see [Latin America] in its own past. If only it recalled that London took three hundred years to build its first city wall ...".

The novel was published in 1989, when the Soviet Union was disintegrating and the political map was being radically redrawn. Reviewing The General in His Labyrinth in 1990, the novelist Margaret Atwood pointed to another instance of García Márquez raising political issues through the character of the General. He has him tell his aide that the United States is "omnipotent and terrible, and that its tale of liberty will end in a plague of miseries for us all". Atwood noted the contemporary relevance of this sentiment, since "the patterns of Latin American politics, and of United States intervention in them, have not changed much in 160 years." She suggested that García Márquez's fictionalization of Bolívar is a lesson "for our own turbulent age ... Revolutions have a long history of eating their progenitors." The central character is a man at the end of his life, who has seen his revolution and dream of a united Latin America fail.

=== Figural labyrinth ===
According to literary critic David Danow, the labyrinth of the novel's title refers to "a series of labyrinths that are contingent upon matters of history, geography, and biography ... that consistently and conclusively result in a dead end"—in this case, the General's own death. His final voyage along the Magdalena River involves a doubling back and forth from one location to another that leads him and his followers nowhere. The labyrinth does not lead to happiness; instead, it results in madness from constant pondering on the past and an impossible future. At the end of his life, the General is reduced to a spectre of his former self. The labyrinth also recalls the labyrinth built to imprison the minotaur in Greek mythology, and the endless travelling and searching of ancient Greek heroes. In Danow's view, "The Labyrinth mirrors the wanderings and travails of the hero in search for meaning and resolution to the vicissitudes of life".

García Márquez depicts the General's body itself as a labyrinth. His doctor observes that "everything that enters the body, adds weight, and everything that leaves it is debased." The General's body is described as a "labyrinth coming to a literal dead end". The labyrinth is also expressed in geographical and architectural imagery. The country's destiny is imagined as a break-up, a folding of north into south. The seas offer the hope of a new life and a new world, but the closer the General is to Colombia, the less chance he has of moving on. García Márquez describes buildings as "daunting, reverberating (if not exactly reiterating) with the echoes of a bloody past". The portrayal of the General's world as a labyrinth is underlined by his constant return to cities and towns he has visited before: each location belongs to the past as well as to the present. The General in his Labyrinth blurs the lines between perdition in a man-made world and wandering in the natural world.

=== Fate and love ===
Bolívar's fate is known from the beginning, and García Márquez constantly uses images which foreshadow this ending. For instance, a clock stuck at seven minutes past one, the exact time of the General's death, appears repeatedly in the novel. This sense of fate is introduced in the epigraph, which comes from a letter written by the historical Bolívar to General Santander on August 4, 1823: "It seems that the devil controls the business of my life." As Palencia-Roth points out, the word used for devil here is demonio rather than the more familiar diablo. Demonio derives from the Greek word daimon, which can equally mean divine power, fate, or destiny. Accordingly, the General succumbs to his fate and accepts his death as destiny.

The theme of love is central to the novel. Bolívar had a reputation as a womanizer, and books have been written on his philandering; but as depicted in this novel, during the last seven months of his life, the General could no longer engage in the activities that had fueled that reputation. García Márquez mentions a woman every few pages, many of whom are his own invention, exploring love through the General's memories. Palencia-Roth notes that the presence of these women "allows a labyrinthine exploration of his life before his final journey" and suggests that García Márquez uses love as a barometer of the General's heart and health. Although Bolívar is usually thought to have died from tuberculosis, Palencia-Roth believes that for the author, the General dies from the lack of love. "Despised by many of his countrymen, abandoned by all but a few aides and associates, left—during the final seven months of his life—without even the companionship of his longtime mistress Manuela Saenz, Bolívar had no choice but to die of a broken heart."

=== Numbers and religious symbols ===
Numbers are an important symbolic aspect of the novel. The book is divided into eight chapters, almost all of equal length, which represent the eight-year love affair between the General and Manuela Sáenz. The General's last hours are marked by an octagonal clock. Allusions to the number three are even more common in the novel. As García Márquez scholar Isabel Rodríguez Vergara notes, the number three—the Trinity which occupies a vital place in the symbology of the Catholic Mass—is repeated 21 times throughout the book. She quotes Mircea Eliade: "In the novel it represents a symbolic sacrifice aimed at redeeming humankind—that of Bolívar, a misunderstood redeemer sacrificed by his own people."

Rodríguez Vergara observes that the General is like a supernatural being, simultaneously dying and being surrounded by symbolic circumstances such as rain, fiestas, and the plague. The novel begins with Bolívar immersed in purifying waters, in a state of ecstasy and meditation that suggests a priestly ritual. One of the women with whom the General sleeps, Queen Marie Louise, is described as a virgin with the profile of an idol—an allusion to the Virgin Mary. The General rides a mule into the last towns on his journey towards death, echoing Christ's entry into Jerusalem. He dies of mysterious and unknown causes, and the people burn his belongings in fear of catching his illness. In Rodríguez Vergara's view, "Bolívar was sacrificed as a scapegoat to purge the guilt of the community."

René Girard has interpreted the recurrence of rain in the novel as one of the purifying rituals the community must undergo in order to wash away the contagion of violence. The fiestas may represent another ritual of purification and also symbolize war. Fiestas are held to honour the General when he arrives at a town, but at other times, political demonstrations against the General are mistaken for a fiesta. According to Rodríguez Vergara, this shows how "information is manipulated" and "depicts an atmosphere where fiesta and war are synonymous".

=== Melancholy and mourning ===
Latin American cultural theorist Carlos J. Alonso, drawing on Freudian theory, argues that the novel is essentially a therapeutic device, designed to help move Latin America past its problematic experience of modernity. He compares this to the way the healing state of mourning replaces grief in the process of recovering from a death. Both activities are mechanisms for dealing with loss. Alonso believes that The General in his Labyrinth, by almost entirely centering the novel on the General's death, forces the reader to confront the horror of this process. In Alonso's view, the reader is meant to pass from "a melancholy relationship vis-a-vis the figure of Bolívar to a relationship that has the therapeutic qualities of mourning instead".

Latin America's history and culture, Alonso suggests, began with the loss of Bolívar's dream of a united continent and as a result has developed under a melancholy shadow ever since. Thus, by forcing the reader to return to the origin of modernity in Latin America and confront its death in the most horrific way, García Márquez compels the reader to move from melancholy to mourning, "so that the phantom of the lost object of modernity may cease to rule the libidinal economy of Spanish American cultural discourse and historical life".

=== Challenging history ===
García Márquez comments on the nature of historical fact by drawing attention to the way history is written. The novel recreates a time in Bolívar's life that has no historical precedent, as there is no record of the last 14 days of his life. In García Márquez's account readers observe Bolívar intimately, seeing his human qualities. In the view of critic Isabel Alvarez Borland, by choosing to fictionalize a national hero in this way, García Márquez is challenging the claim of official history to represent the truth. In the "My Thanks" section of the novel, García Márquez asserts ironically that what he is writing is more historical than fictional, and he discusses his own historical methodology in detail. By posing in the role of a historian, he challenges the reliability of written history from within the writing process. According to Alvarez Borland, this serves to "remind us that a claim to truth is not the property of any text; rather it is the result of how a historian (as a reader) interprets the facts".

The General in His Labyrinth also confronts the methods of official historians by using an oral style of narration. The narration can be considered an oral account in that it is woven from the verbal interactions of everyday people. Alvarez Borland explains that the advantage of this technique, as discussed by Walter Ong, is that "the orality of any given culture, residing in the unwritten tales of its peoples, possesses a spontaneity and liveliness which is lost once this culture commits its tales to writing." The oral style of narration therefore provides a truthfulness which official history lacks. Alvarez Borland concludes that The General in His Labyrinth suggests new ways of writing the past; it takes account of voices that were never written down as part of official history.

The historian Ben Hughes commented on the novel: "The Liberator's British confidants, including Daniel O'Leary, were amongst the closest figures to the general in this period. Nevertheless, they are ignored in the novel. Instead, Márquez uses the character of a fictional Colombian servant, José Palacios, as The Liberator's final sounding board, thereby neatly sidestepping the more complex reality." In Hughes's view, modern South American literature has played a role in cleansing the national memory of British soldiers' assistance to The Liberator.

== Comparisons with other García Márquez novels ==
In an interview published in the Colombian weekly Revista Semana on March 20, 1989, García Márquez told María Elvira Samper, "At bottom, I have written only one book, the same one that circles round and round, and continues on." Palencia-Roth suggests that this novel is a "labyrinthine summation ... of García Márquez's long-standing obsessions and ever-present topics: love, death, solitude, power, fate".

Like the Patriarch in García Márquez's The Autumn of the Patriarch, Bolívar was an absolute dictator. The Patriarch is never identified by name; Bolívar, too, is identified chiefly by his title. Bolívar also invites comparison with Colonel Aureliano Buendía in One Hundred Years of Solitude: both characters believe the wars they have waged have been fruitless and overwhelming, and both face numerous attempts on their lives, but eventually die of natural causes. In his belief that life is controlled by fate, the General resembles Buendía in One Hundred Years of Solitude and Santiago Nasar in Chronicle of a Death Foretold.

Palencia-Roth notes that critics have been struck by the humorless elegiac style of The General in His Labyrinth; its dark mood and somber message is similar to that of The Autumn of the Patriarch. Love is a theme common to both Love in the Time of Cholera and The General in His Labyrinth, but the latter is considered a tragedy. These two novels have been used to demonstrate the range of García Márquez's work.

Isabel Alvarez Borland, in her essay "The Task of the Historian in El general en su laberinto", claims that " ... while El general en su laberinto is in many ways a continuation of García Márquez's criticism of Latin America's official history seen in his earlier works, the novel contrasts sharply with his previous fictions". In Chronicle of a Death Foretold, according to Alvarez Borland, the narrator challenges the truth of official language. However, The General in His Labyrinth "differs from these [earlier works] in employing narrative strategies which seek to answer in a much more overt and didactic fashion questions that the novel poses about history".

In a summary of Edward Hood's book La ficcion de Gabriel García Márquez: Repetición e intertextualidad, García Márquez is characterized as an author who uses repetition and autointertextualidad (intertextuality between the works of a single author) extensively in his fiction, including in The General in His Labyrinth. Hood points out some obvious examples of repetition in García Márquez's works: the themes of solitude in One Hundred Years of Solitude, tyranny in Autumn of the Patriarch, and the desire for a unified continent expressed by Bolívar in The General in His Labyrinth. An example of intertextuality can be seen in the repetition of patterns between books. For example, both Jose Arcadio Buendia in One Hundred Years of Solitude and Bolívar in The General in his Labyrinth experience labyrinthian dreams.

== Genre ==
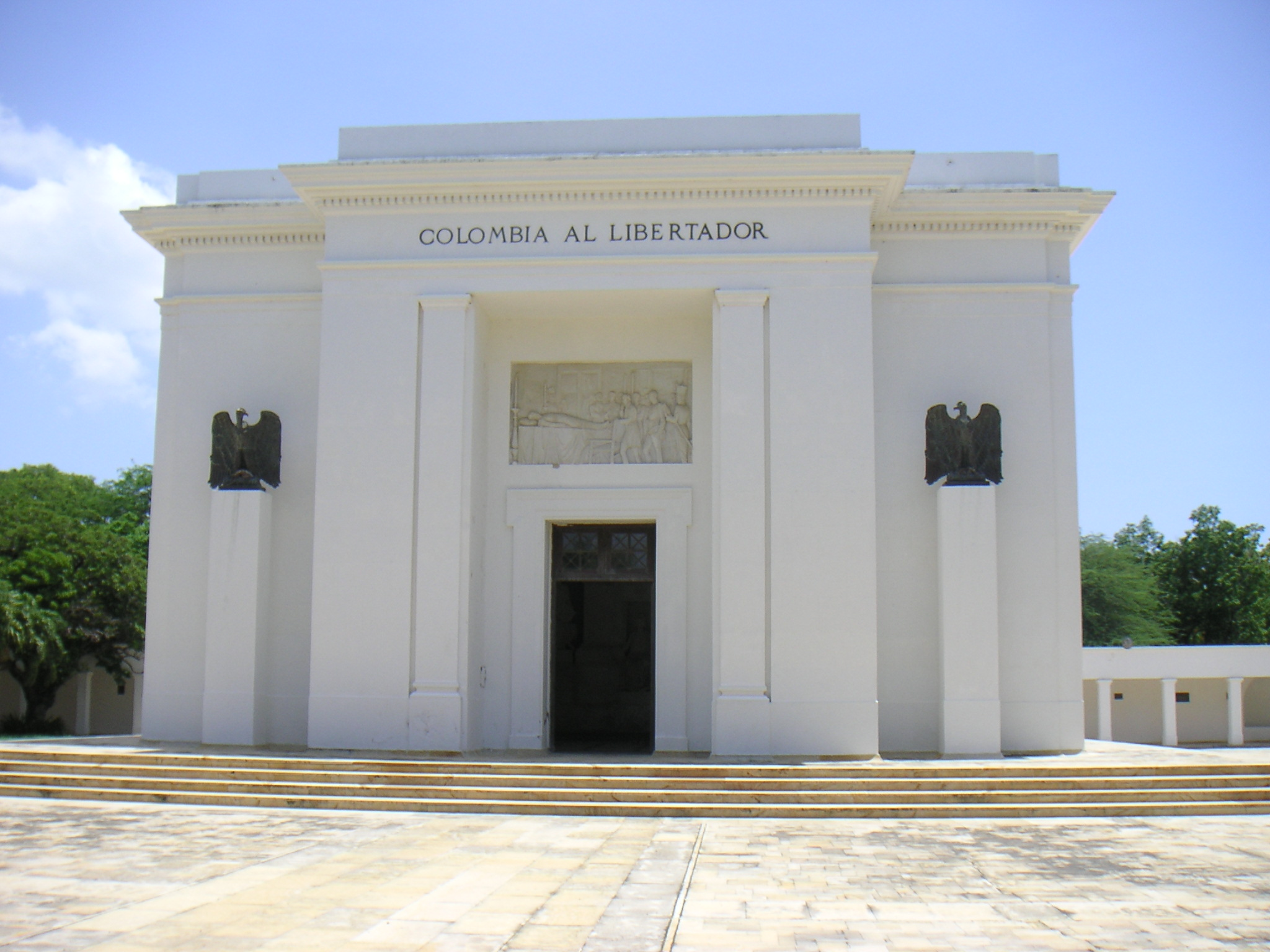
Memorial to Simón Bolívar at the Quinta de San Pedro Alejandrino just outside Santa Marta, Colombia. The final pages of The General in His Labyrinth are set in Santa Marta.

Critics consider García Márquez's book in terms of the historical novel, but differ over whether the label is appropriate. In his review of The General in his Labyrinth, Selden Rodman hesitated to call it a novel, since it was so heavily researched, giving Bolívar's views "on everything from life and love to his chronic constipation and dislike of tobacco smoke". On the other hand, reviewer Robert Adams suggested that García Márquez had "improved on history". According to critic Donald L. Shaw, The General in His Labyrinth is a "New Historical Novel", a genre that he argues crosses between Boom, Post-Boom, and Postmodernist fiction in Latin American literature: "New Historical Novels tend either to retell historical events from an unconventional perspective, but one which preserves their intelligibility, or to question the very possibility of making sense of the past at all." Shaw believes that this novel belongs to the first category. García Márquez is presenting both a historical account and his own interpretation of events.

David Bushnell, writing in The Hispanic American Historical Review, points out that the work is less a pure historical account than others suggest. García Márquez's Bolívar is a man "who wanders naked through the house, suffers constipation, uses foul language, and much more besides." He argues that documentation does not support many of these details. Bushnell suggests, however, that the fact that the novel is not entirely historically accurate does not necessarily distinguish it from the work of professional historians. The main difference, Bushnell believes, is that García Márquez's work "is far more readable" than a pure history.

== Reception ==
The General in His Labyrinth was relatively poorly received by the general public in the United States, despite the praise of critics. Critic Ilan Stavans, who himself praised the book as "one of the writer's most sophisticated and accomplished", attributes this to the novel's time period and to its profusion of historical information, neither of which proved attractive to English-speaking readers. Isabel Alvarez Borland notes that, like Stavans, "critics in the United States have largely celebrated García Márquez's portrait of this national hero and considered it a tour de force"; but she also observes that in Latin America the book received more mixed reviews, ranging from "outrage to unqualified praise".

The novel generated huge controversy in Latin America: some Venezuelan and Colombian politicians described its depiction of Bolívar as "profane". According to Stavans, they accused García Márquez of "defaming the larger-than-life reputation of a historical figure who, during the nineteenth century, struggled to unite the vast Hispanic world". The novel's publication provoked outrage from many Latin American politicians and intellectuals because its portrayal of the General is not the saintly image long cherished by many. Mexico's ambassador to Austria, Francisco Cuevas Cancino, wrote a damning letter, which was widely publicized in Mexico City, objecting to the portrayal of Bolívar. He stated: "The novel is plagued with errors of fact, conception, fairness, understanding of the [historical] moment and ignorance of its consequences ... It has served the enemies of [Latin] America, who care only that they can now denigrate Bolívar, and with him all of us." Even the novel's admirers, such as the leading Venezuelan diplomat and writer Arturo Uslar Pietri, worried that some facts were stretched. García Márquez believes, however, that Latin America has to discover the General's labyrinth to recognize and deal with its own maze of problems.

More positively, Nelson Bocaranda, a Venezuelan TV commentator, considers the novel to be a tonic for Latin American culture: "people here saw a Bolívar who is a man of flesh and bones just like themselves". Mexican author Carlos Fuentes agrees with Bocaranda saying: "What comes across beautifully and poignantly in this book is a man dealing with the unknown [world of democratic ideas]". García Márquez realistically portrays a ridiculous figure trapped in a labyrinth, magnifying the General's defects, and presenting an image of Bolívar contrary to that instilled in classrooms. However, the novel also depicts Bolívar as an idealist and political theorist who predicted many problems that would obstruct Latin American advancement in the future. García Márquez depicts a figure who was aware of the racial and social friction in Latin American society, feared debt, and warned against economic irresponsibility. He has the General warn his aide-de-camp, Agustín de Iturbide, against the future interference of the United States in the internal affairs of Latin America.

Novelist and critic Bárbara Mujica comments that the book's English translator, Edith Grossman, fully captures the multiple levels of meaning of the text, as well as García Márquez's modulations in tone. García Márquez himself has admitted that he prefers his novels in their English translations.

== Publication history ==
The original Spanish version of The General in His Labyrinth was published simultaneously in Argentina, Colombia, Mexico, and Spain in 1989. The first American edition was listed as a best seller in The New York Times the following year.

The novel has been translated into many languages since its first publication in Spanish, as detailed by Sfeir de González in 2003.

Year	Language	Title	Translator	Company	Pages
1989	Arabic	Al-Jiniral fi matahatihi	Salih Ilmani	Nicosia: IBAL	287
1989	German	Der General in seinem Labyrinth: Roman	Dagmar Ploetz	Cologne: Kiepenheuer & Witsch	359
1989	Swedish	Generalen i sin labyrint	Jens Nordenhök	Stockholm: Wahlström & Widstrand	267
1989	Portuguese	O General em seu Labirinto	Moacir Werneck de Castro	Rio de Janeiro: Editora Record	281
1990	English	The General in His Labyrinth	Edith Grossman	New York City: Alfred A. Knopf	285
1990	French	Le Général dans son labyrinthe	Annie Morvan	Paris: B. Grasset	318
1990	Turkish	Labirentindeki General	İnci Kut	Istanbul: Can Yayınları	253
1990	Vietnamese	Tướng quân giữa mê hồn trận	Nguyễn Trung Đức	Hanoi: "Văn học" Publisher and "Hội nhà văn" Publisher	327
1990	Basque	Jenerala bere laberintoan	Xabier Mendiguren	Donostia-San Sebastián, Spain: Eikar	279
1991	Hebrew	General be-mavokh	Ritah Meltser and Amatsyah Porat	Tel Aviv: Am Oved	205
1991	Japanese	Meikyū no Shōgun	Kimura Eiichi	Tokyo: Shinchosha	323
1991	Persian	Zhiniral dar hazar tu-yi khvad	Hushang Asadi (based on the English version)	Tehran: Kitab-i Mahnaz	237
1992	Hungarian	A tábornok útvesztője	Tomcsányi Zsuzsanna	Budapest: Magvető	254
1992, 1996	Italian	Il generale nel suo labirinto	Angelo Morino	Milan: Mondadori	286
1993	Polish	Generał w labiryncie	Zofia Wasitowa	Warsaw: Pánstwowy Instytut Wydawniczy	285
1995	Chinese	Mi gong zhong di jiang jun	Chengdong Yin	Taipei: Yun chen wen hua shi ye	321
1996	Dutch	De generaal in zijn labyrint	Mieke Westra	Amsterdam: Meulenhoff, 3rd ed.	317
1996	Romanian	Generalul în labirintul său	Mihaela Dumitrescu	Bucharest: RAO	256
1998	Russian	Генерал в своём лабиринте/General v svoem labirinte	A. Borisova	St. Petersburg: Alyans-Plus	320
1999	Vietnamese	Tướng quân giữa mê hồn trận	Nguyễn Trung Đức	Hanoi: Hội Nhà Văn	394
2000	Albanian	Gjenerali në labirintin e vet:Roman	Nasi Lera	Tirana: Mësonjëtorja e Parë	305
1990	Greek	Ο στρατηγός μες στο Λαβύρινθό του	Klaiti Sotiriadou - Barajas	Athens: Livanis Publications	309
2014	Georgian	გენერალი თავის ლაბირინთში	Thea Gvasalia	Tbilisi: Intelekti Publishing	274
