= Piero Milesi =

Italian composer

Piero Milesi (1953 in Milan – 2011 in Levanto) was an Italian musician, composer, and music arranger.

== Biography ==
Milesi began his career by studying cello, composition, and experimental electronic music. He joined the International Folk Group of Moni Ovadia in 1977 as a performer and composer.

The composition Modi was created between 1978 and 1980. It is a two-part composition which was published in 1982 by the British independent label Cherry Red Records following an introduction to the label by another Cherry Red artist, Morgan Fisher. Since 1984 his compositions have been produced by Studio Azzurro di Milano.

The compositions The Nuclear Observatory of Mr. Nanof and Camera Astratta (Abstract Chamber) are two soundtracks produced by the American independent label Cuneiform Records.

From 1995 to 1996 he arranged, produced and performed on Anime salve, the final album by Fabrizio De André, having already orchestrated and arranged his previous album Le nuvole.

In 1997 he arranged the album "Sixteenth Moon" by Japanese pop star Kazufumi Miyazawa, produced by Hugh Padgham and featuring musicians Manu Katché, Dominic Miller, and Pino Palladino.

Milesi composed various soundtracks for film and theater and worked as an arranger and composer for various Italian pop artists (e.g., Fiorella Mannoia, Luciano Ligabue). Holding a degree in architecture, he created sound installations and musical interventions in large spaces (in one of which he was assisted by Brian Eno). His last-published new recording was "MInute Quartet" on the compilation album "Miniatures 2" (released in 2000 on Cherry Red Records) produced by Morgan Fisher. It is a one-minute string quartet in four movements.

== Discography ==
- 1982 - Modes - Cherry Red Records BRED 42
- 1986 - The Nuclear Observatory of Mr. Nanof - Cuneiform Records
- 1989 - Camera astratta - Cuneiform Records 1989
- 2000 - Within Himself (collection) - Cuneiform Records 2000
