= Thornton Wilder Prize =

Awarded by the American Academy of Arts & Letters

Thornton Wilder Prize for Translation
- Sponsored by: Tappan Wilder and Catharine Wilder Guiles
- Country: United States
- Status: Active
- First award: 2009

The Thornton Wilder Prize for Translation, established in 2009, is awarded by the American Academy of Arts & Letters to a practitioner, scholar or patron who has made a significant contribution to the art of literary translation. It was established by Tappan Wilder and Catharine Wilder Guiles, the nephew and niece of Academy member Thornton Wilder (1897–1975), and given for the first time in 2009.

This prize is a biennial award (given every two years) and generally carries a value of $20,000. The establishment of the prize specifically honors Thornton Wilder's personal dedication to the craft of translation; Wilder himself translated works by authors like Ibsen and Sartre and famously shared royalties with his German translators, believing they deserved greater recognition. Winners are selected by the Academy's Literature Awards Committee following nominations from Academy members. Notable recipients include major figures who have shaped the field, such as Gregory Rabassa (2009), Edith Grossman (2022), and, most recently, Charlotte Mandell and Michael F. Moore (2024), who shared the award.

== Recipients ==
Thornton Wilder Prize winners
Year	Translator	Ref.
2009	Gregory Rabassa	
2012	Michael Hofmann	
2014	David Hinton	
2016	Jamey Gambrell	
2018	Bill Porter (Red Pine)	
2020	Linda Asher	
2022	Edith Grossman	
2024	Charlotte Mandell and Michael F. Moore	
2026	Ann Goldstein	
