= The Adventures and Misadventures of Maqroll =

Compilation of novellas by Álvaro Mutis

The Adventures and Misadventures of Maqroll (orig. Spanish Empresas y Tribulaciones de Maqroll el Gaviero) is a compilation of novellas by Colombian author Álvaro Mutis. The previously published novellas were published as a two-volume collection in Colombia in 1993. An English translation by Edith Grossman was published in 2002. The novellas center on the exploits and adventures of Maqroll the Gaviero (gavia is Spanish for topsail, and gaviero is the sailor in charge of the topsail, but there is also a pun with the word gavia which, like gaviota, also means seagull), and his travels on sea and on land across the world.

== Novellas ==
=== The Snow of the Admiral ===
The narrator, browsing in a used book store, finds pages from Maqroll's diary describing an upriver barge journey to rumored sawmills for a dubious business proposition. The barge captain is a drunk, the mechanic a silent Indian, and the pilot eminently forgettable. Maqroll has sex with an Indian woman and contracts a nearly fatal disease, but is cured by the commander of a military outpost. Finding the sawmills defunct, Maqroll travels to the uplands only to find that "The Snow of the Admiral", the establishment of a beloved mistress, Flor Estévez, is in ruins.

=== Ilona Comes with the Rain ===
Maqroll finds himself in Panama City, living in squalor and fencing stolen goods. He joins Ilona Grabowska Rubenstein, a former lover, in her scheme to staff a brothel with women dressed as airline stewardesses. They hire a boy named Longinos to recruit business via local hotel bellhops; he eventually becomes the brothel manager. Their scheme is profitable, but one of their prostitutes, who lives in a beached boat and hallucinates military lovers from the Napoleonic era, lures Ilona into a fatal relationship.

=== Un Bel Morir ===
Maqroll, living in La Plata, is hired by a shady individual of dubious nationality to transport crates of machinery and instruments, by mule train, up a crumbling trail to railroad engineers on a mountain ridge. While employed at this task, he has an affair with an attractive young woman named Amparo María. The accidental fall of a mule reveals that the crates contain Czech submachine guns, and the supposed engineers turn out to be smugglers. An Army captain interrogates him, then instructs him to cooperate going forward. Subsequently, Maqroll discovers that additional crates contain TNT. He agrees to a plan to escape downriver by barge. The Army fights the smugglers, who slaughter fleeing residents, including Amparo María. A different Army captain then detains Maqroll, but later releases him, advising him to flee on the barge. He learns that his former mistress, Flor Estévez, had been searching for him, but had finally left with the captain of an oil company boat. Maqroll departs on his final journey, piloting a barge with a failing engine. A customs launch finds his body in a mangrove swamp, along with that of an unidentified woman.

=== The Tramp Steamer's Last Port of Call ===
The narrator, in Helsinki on oil company business, gazes toward Saint Petersburg across the Gulf of Finland and spots a grimy tramp steamer barely making headway. He sees the ship again in Costa Rica, in Jamaica, and finally in the Orinoco River delta. On a tugboat, he meets fellow passenger Jon Iturri, a former captain of the steamer, who states that the ship broke up and sank in the Orinoco River. Maqroll learns that the ship's owner was a beautiful Lebanese woman named Warda, sister to Maqroll's friend Abdul Bashur. Iturri and Warda conducted a torrid affair, meeting at the steamer's ports of call, but the affair ended when the ship sank. The narrator also discovers that he has witnessed key moments in the life of the tramp steamer and its captain.

=== Amirbar ===
While in California recuperating from treatment for malaria, Maqroll tells friends an account of his time mining gold in Colombia. With the help a friend, Dora Estela, Maqroll secured a local guide, Eulogio, located an abandoned mine, and began to dig for ore. Maqroll learned of the local belief that the mine was haunted by the ghosts of owners, engineers, and laborers murdered years before in a shaft, whose bodies Eulogio later discovered. Periodic draughts of wind from the mine made a sound like the word "Amirbar". On a trip to carry ore to town, Eulogio was arrested and tortured by the military. Maqroll continued to work the mine with the help of Antonia, a woman with a "disquieting appearance" with whom he performed anal sex. When Antonia learned of Maqroll's plan to leave, she tried to kill him, fled, and was placed in an asylum. After Maqroll abandoned the mine, Eulogio's friend Doña Claudia warned Maqroll that the military sought to arrest him. Dora Estela gave Maqroll money for passage on a ship, arranged his escape to the coast by truck, and slept with Maqroll. At the coast, Maqroll boarded a ship and sailed to La Rochelle. The story ends with a letter from Maqroll describing his years as a sailor and officer on board the Danish ship Skive, and how he then traveled to Mallorca and settled in Pollença.

=== Abdul Bashur, Dreamer of Ships ===
Concerns the Quixotic, world-wide search of Bashur, Maqroll's long-time partner in crime and business, for the ideal freighter. The narrator had met Bashur when Bashur helped him survive the aftermath of an improbably difficult catering event in a remote South American port. Bashur's sister Fatima provides the narrator, whom she had met when she extricated Maqroll from legal jeopardy, with letters and photographs documenting Bashur's life. One memorable episode involves a plot by Maqroll and Bashur's friend and lover, Ilona Grabowska, to smuggle antique Persian carpets from Marseilles to Geneva. The venture proves very profitable, and Bashur plans to use his share to find and buy his ideal ship. Bashur fixates on the Thorn, and begins negotiations with its owner, a Colombian drug lord, but narrowly escapes with his life, and the ship is destroyed. Another venture involves the transport of Croatian Muslims to Mecca, which proves nearly fatal for a beautiful woman who is caught in adultery with Bashur. Other exploits include smuggling arms for Catalonian anarchists, running a Fagin-like band of boy pickpockets in Piraeus, and being robbed and narrowly escaping death in a Philippine brothel. Ultimately, Bashur dies in Funchal in a crash landing while traveling to inspect a vintage tramp steamer in Madeira, in a scene eerily reminiscent of one of Fatima's photographs from Bashur's boyhood.

=== Triptych on Sea and Land ===
The final novella, composed of 3 stories, describes Maqroll's friendships with the fisherman Sverre Jensen, the painter Alejandro Obregón, and Abdul Bashur's child Jamil Vicente:

The first of the three stories, "Appointment in Bergen", recounts Maqroll's friendship with Sverre Jensen, with whom Maqroll shared a British Columbia jail cell for two months. Subsequently, they begin to travel together, working on fishing boats and on the docks. They occasionally discuss their respective pacts with death. After many years, the two part company in Saint-Malo, with Jensen traveling to Bergen to live in the Seamen's Shelter and Maqroll eventually taking a job on a coastal steamer. Several months later, Maqroll receives a suicide letter from Jensen in which Jensen states that he values their mutual understanding, and that he has reached his limit. Maqroll agrees that his own tossing from place to place is another way of doing what Jensen did.

In the next tale, "A True History of the Encounters and Complicities of Maqroll the Gaviero and the Painter Alejandro Obregón", the narrator meets his friend Obregón in Madrid. Obregón relates the time in Cartegena when he met Maqroll; the two discussed the curious behavior of the cats of Istanbul and Cartegena. Several months later, they meet again in Curaçao and travel together to Aruba and Cartegena. Some time later, Maqroll sends the narrator a letter in which he discusses meeting Obregón in Kuala Lumpur, where Obregón had missed a flight and decided to participate in a passing funeral procession. Maqroll describes Obregón's angelic yet heretical painting style and his involvement with a local woman. Maqroll further relates how Obregón came to his aid when Maqroll was stranded in British Columbia with no papers or money. In visits to several taverns over several days, Obregón sets forth his philosophy of painting. Finally, the narrator describes how a Gabriel García Márquez manuscript maintained that it was Obregón who found Maqroll's body in the swamp where he met his end, and that the woman with him was Flor Estévez, but Obregón himself leaves the narrator in doubt about the incident.

In the last of the three tales, "Jamil", the narrator and his wife visit Maqroll in Pollença, where the priest Mossén Ferrán is hosting Maqroll. Maqroll depicts how he received a letter from Lina Vicente, mother to Abdul Bashur's child Jamil, asking for Maqroll's help. Maqroll sails from Palma to Port-Vendres, where he meets with Vicente and Jamil, who strongly reminds Maqroll of Bashur. Maqroll agrees to take care of Jamil, but because Jamil has Tunisian papers, he has to smuggle Jamil overland into Spain. Living in Maqroll's dilapidated shipyard room, he and the boy fish, converse, and develop a bond. Ferrán registers Jamil in a parish school but Jamil, taunted by other boys, chooses to be educated by Maqroll. When the boy falls ill, Maqroll nurses him through a long convalescence. Jamil recovers, but some months later when his mother comes for him, he and Maqroll part reluctantly. Ferrán tells the narrator and his wife that "Jamil is now part of the memories that Maqroll says sustain him in the task of living each day."

== Reception ==
The New York Review of Books stated that

Maqroll the Gaviero (the Lookout) is one of the most alluring and memorable characters in the fiction of the last twenty-five years. His extravagant and hopeless undertakings, his brushes with the law and scrapes with death, and his enduring friendships and unlooked-for love affairs make him a Don Quixote for our day, driven from one place to another by a restless and irregular quest for the absolute."

Leonard Michaels, in describing the first three novellas, wrote in The New York Times that

Each... is about high adventure and a period in the life of Maqroll..., a rootless man who knocks about the world from Siberia to Europe, Africa, Alaska and the Americas of the Caribbean. As the novellas move through time (and Maqroll grows older), they have the cumulative effect of a single novel -- one complicated by many stories and, within the stories, dreams, hallucinations and reflections, as Maqroll finds himself in every climate, in exotic places, amid characters of unpredictable, psychopathic violence. The novellas, translated by Edith Grossman, add up to a fascinating and original work, rich in thought and action."

In The New Yorker, John Updike wrote that the collection is

a latter-day "Don Quixote" whose central persona, both amusingly shadowy and adamantly consistent, moves around the globe somewhat as the Knight of the Mournful Countenance traversed the plains of Spain. Employing a resourceful variety of narrative textures and strategies, Mutis follows his hero through incidents of a Conradian exoticism; the narrative method, like that of Conrad, picturesquely involves the assembly of a coherent story from scattered documents, distant rumors, and elaborately couched secondhand recountings on betranced tropical verandas."

Todd Grimson, in the Los Angeles Times, wrote that the first "three linked novellas... really add up to a brilliant novel..." and that "The reader finishes this book in an exalted state, wanting the tales of the eponymous Maqroll never to end."

== Influences ==
- The Italian singer-songwriter Fabrizio De André (1940-1999) summarized the book in the text of the song Smisurata preghiera, written whith Ivano Fossati of his album Anime salve (1996). A spanish version of the song, Desmedida plegaria, sung by De André is in the score of the film Ilona Arrives with the Rain.
