= Mayra Montero =

Cuban-Puerto Rican writer

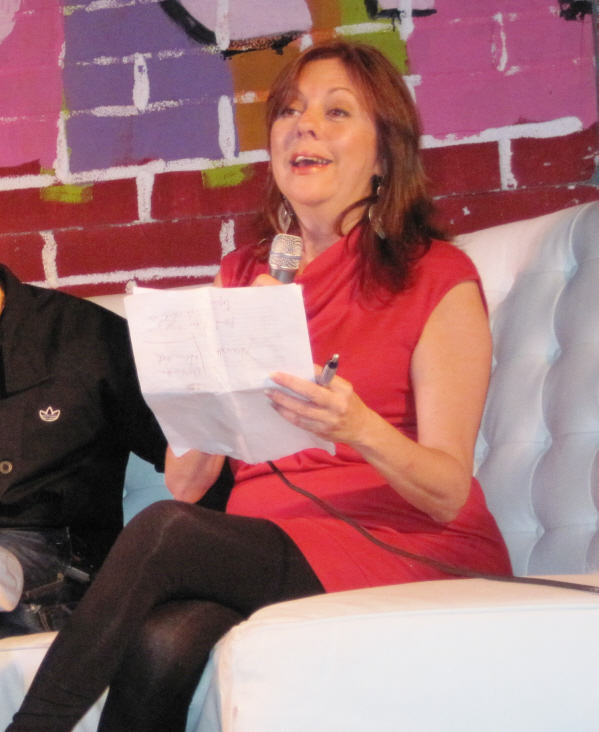

Mayra Montero (born 1952) is a Cuban-Puerto Rican writer.

== Biography ==
Montero was born in Havana, Cuba in 1952. She is the daughter of Manuel Montero, a Cuban comedic writer and actor who made his career in both Cuba and Puerto Rico, where he and his family relocated when Mayra was a young girl. Manuel, whose pen name was "Membrillo", earned his greatest success playing "Ñico Fernández", a comedic character in Puerto Rican television. This character was a Cuban immigrant with a habit of using hyperbole to describe his homeland and all things Cuban.

Mayra has lived in Puerto Rico since the mid-1960s. She studied journalism in Mexico and Puerto Rico and worked for many years as a correspondent in Central America and the Caribbean. In the 1980s she was an editorial page editor for the now defunct El Mundo daily newspaper, at the time Puerto Rico's newspaper of record. She is presently a journalist in Puerto Rico and writes a weekly column "Antes que llegue el lunes" (Before Monday arrives) in El Nuevo Dia newspaper.

== Literary work ==
All of her books are written originally in Spanish and have been broadly translated to English and other languages. Montero's first book was a collection of short stories, Twenty-Three and a Turtle. Her second book, a novel titled The Braid of the Beautiful Moon, was a finalist for the Herralde awards, one of Europe's most prestigious literary awards. Each of her subsequent books—The Last Night I Spent With You, The Red of His Shadow, In the Palm of Darkness, and The Messenger—has been published in the United States in translations by Edith Grossman, as well as in several European countries. The slim novel or novella, The Last Night I Spent With You is perhaps the most sexually explicit. Her other nonfiction work appears frequently in scholarly and literary publications throughout the world. Her most recent novel Son de Almendra is the product of extensive research about the murder of the mafia leader Albert Anastasia at the Park Sheraton Hotel in New York in the year 1957.

== Political activism ==
In 2006, she signed a petition in support of the independence of Puerto Rico from the United States of America.

== Publications ==
- La mitad de la noche, 2019
- El caballero de San Petersburgo (Spanish edition of El caballero de la flauta), 2014
- El caballero de la flauta, 2011
- Viaje a la isla de Mona (Trip to Mona Island), 2009
- Son de Almendra (Dancing to "Almendra"), 2005
- El capitán de los dormidos (Captain of the Sleepers), 2002
- Vana ilusión, 2002
- Púrpura profundo (Deep Purple), 2000
- Como un mensajero tuyo (The Messenger), 1998
- Tú, la oscuridad (In the Palm of Darkness), 1995
- Del rojo de su sombra (The Red of His Shadow), 1993
- La última noche que pasé contigo (The Last Night I Spent with You), 1991
- La trenza de la hermosa luna, 1987
- Veintitrés y una tortuga (Twenty-Three and a Turtle), 1981
