= Tlapitzalli =

A tlapitzalli is an aerophone known from pre-Columbian Mesoamerican cultures, particularly the Aztec. It is a form of flute, made of ceramic, wood, clay, or bone. They are most often decorated with abstract designs or images of Aztec deities. The tlapitzalli could be multi-chambered, examples using up to four chambers are known. Tlapitzalli was also a term that was used to refer to the conch shell trumpets used to coordinate attacks during Aztec war ceremonies.

The name comes from the Nahuatl language.

== See also ==
- Music of Mexico
- Latin American music
- Aztec
