= Julián Ríos =

Spanish writer (born 1941)

Julián Ríos (born 11 March 1941, in Vigo, Galicia) is a Spanish writer, most frequently classified as a postmodernist, whom Mexican novelist Carlos Fuentes has called "the most inventive and creative" of Spanish-language writers. His first two books were co-written with Octavio Paz.

His best known work, experimental and heavily influenced by the verbal inventiveness of James Joyce, was published in 1983 under the title Larva.

== Personal life ==
Ríos lives and works in France, on the outskirts of Paris.

== Bibliography ==
=== Books ===
- Puente de alma, Ed. Galaxia Gutenberg, 2009
- Quijote e hijos, Ed. Galaxia Gutenberg, 2008
- Larva y otras noches de Babel. Antología. Ed. F.C.E., 2008
- Cortejo de sombras: la novela de Tamoga, Galaxia Gutenberg, 2008
- Nuevos sombreros para Alicia, Seix Barral, 2001 (expanded version of 1993 book)
- La vida sexual de las palabras, Ed. Seix Barral, 2000
- Monstruario, Seix Barral, 1999
- Epifanías sin fin, Ed. Literatura y ciencia, 1995
- Amores que atan o Belles letres, Siruela, 1995
- Sombreros para Alicia, Muchnik Editores, 1993
- Retrato de Antonio Saura, Círculo de Arte, 1991
- Poundemonium, Ed. Llibres del Mall, 1985
- Larva. Babel de una noche de San Juan, Ed. Llibres del Mall, 1983
- Teatro de signos. Ed. Fundamentos, 1974 (with Octavio Paz)
- Solo a dos voces. Ed. Lumen, 1973 (with Octavio Paz)

In English

- Loves That Bind
- Monstruary
- Kitaj: Pictures and Conversations, about American artist R. B. Kitaj
- Poundemonium
- Larva: A Midsummer Night's Babel
- House of Ulysses
- Procession of Shadows. Translated by Nick Caistor. Dalkey Archive Press. 2011.

=== Interviews ===
- Interview with Julian Rios
