= Cristiano De André =

Italian singer-songwriter

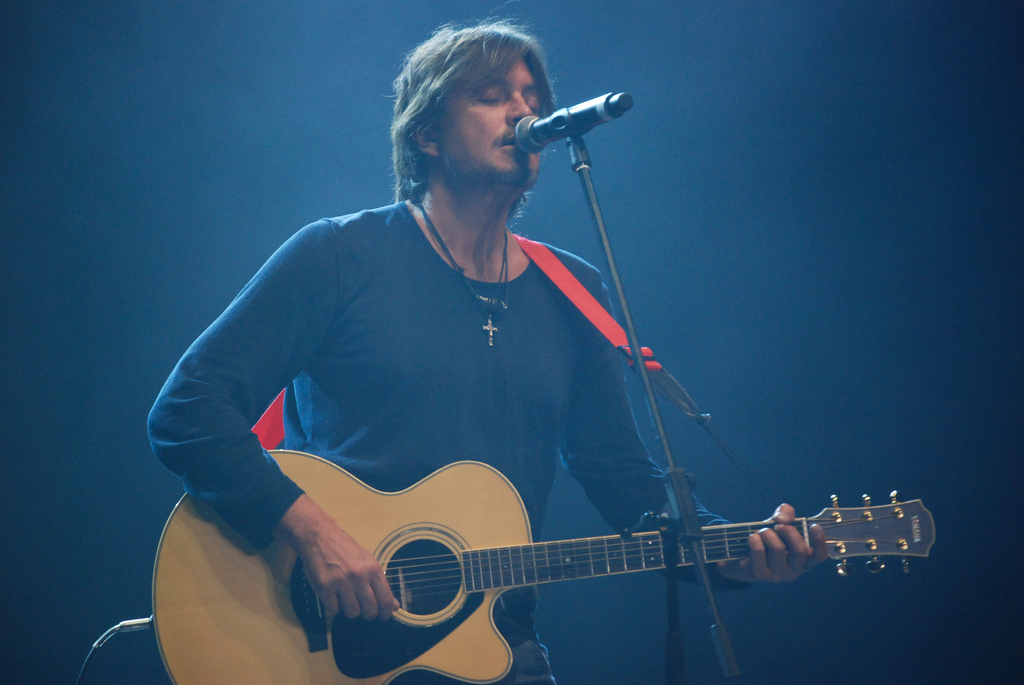
- Cristiano De André performing in 2010

Background information
- Born: 29 December 1962 (age 63); Genoa, Italy
- Genres: Folk; contemporary folk music; pop; rock
- Occupations: Singer; musician; songwriter
- Instruments: Vocals; guitar; violin
- Years active: 1980–present
- Label: Tempi Duri

Cristiano De André (Italian pronunciation: [kriˈstjaːno de anˈdre]; born 29 December 1962) is an Italian singer-songwriter and musician. During his career, he competed four times in the Sanremo Music Festival, receiving three Critics' Awards.

== Biography ==
The son of Fabrizio De André and his first wife, Enrica "Puny" Pignon, he started his career as a member of the band Tempi Duri [i.e. "Hard Times", but also "Rigid Tempos", referring to the lack of flexibility of rock beats], which released the album Chiamali tempi duri in 1982, produced by Cristiano's father. He later started a solo career and, in 1985, he competed in the Sanremo Music Festival, placing fourth in the Newcomers' section and receiving the Critics Award "Mia Martini" for his song "Bella più di me". His self-titled debut album was released in 1987. After releasing the albums L'albero della cuccagna (1990) and Canzoni con il naso lungo (1992), he entered the Sanremo Music Festival for a second time in 1993, placing second in the "Big Artists" section with "Dietro la porta" and receiving his second Critics' Award. In 1998, he was part of Fabrizio De André's last concert tour.

Cristiano De André's fourth studio album, Sul confine, was released in 1995, and featured collaborations with Eugenio Finardi. The album Scaramente was launched in 2001 with a performance at the Premio Tenco, in which he appeared as a guest. The album received the Lunezia Award Two years later, he competed once again in the Sanremo Music Festival, performing the song "Un giorno nuovo". In 2006, after abusing alcohol, he hit his then-partner, Clara Lafitte, and was arrested for resisting a public officer. He came back to music in 2009, with the tour De André canta De André, in which he sang songs originally written and performed by his father Fabrizio. The tour also gave the title to a live album, De André canta De André, released in 2009, and followed by a second volume from the same project, De André canta De André – Vol. 2 (2010). In 2014, De André entered once again the main competition in 64th Sanremo Music Festival, with the songs "Invisibili" and "Il cielo è vuoto". "Invisibili" was eliminated during the first stage of the competition, but received the Critics' Award "Mia Martini" and the "Sergio Bardotti Award" for Best Lyrics, while "Il cielo è vuoto" placed seventh in the main competition. Both songs were included in the album Come in cielo così in guerra.

== Discography ==
=== As a solo artist ===
Studio albums

- Cristiano De André (1987)
- L'albero della cuccagna (1990)
- Canzoni con il naso lungo (1992)
- Sul confine (1995)
- Scaramante (2001)
- Come in cielo, così in guerra (2013)

Live albums

- Un giorno nuovo (2003)
- De André canta De André (2009)
- De André canta De André – vol. 2 (2010)
- De André canta De Andrè - vol. 3 (2017)

=== With Tempi Duri ===
Studio albums

- Chiamali tempi duri (1982)
