= Teatro Brancaccio =

Theatre in Rome, Italy

Coordinates: 41.8935°N 12.5005°E

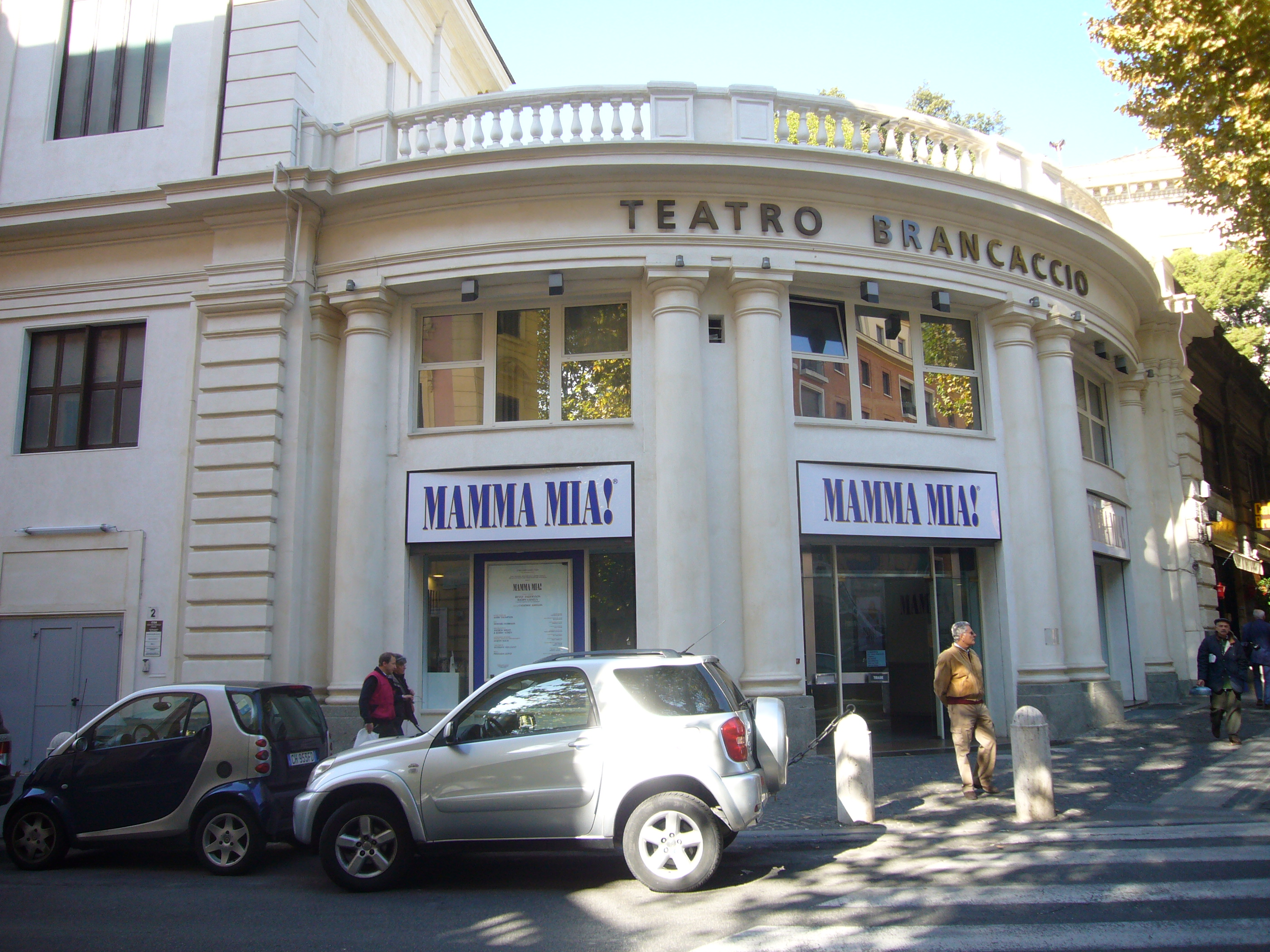
Teatro Brancaccio

The Teatro Brancaccio (i.e. "Brancaccio Theater"), also known as Politeama Brancaccio, is a 1,300-seat theatre and cinema located in Esquilino, Rome, Italy.

It was inaugurated in 1916 with the name Teatro Morgana and since 1937 it was used also as a cinema. After some years of decline the theater, owned by the City of Rome, was restored and reopened in 1978.
