= Álvaro Mutis =

Colombian poet, novelist and essayist

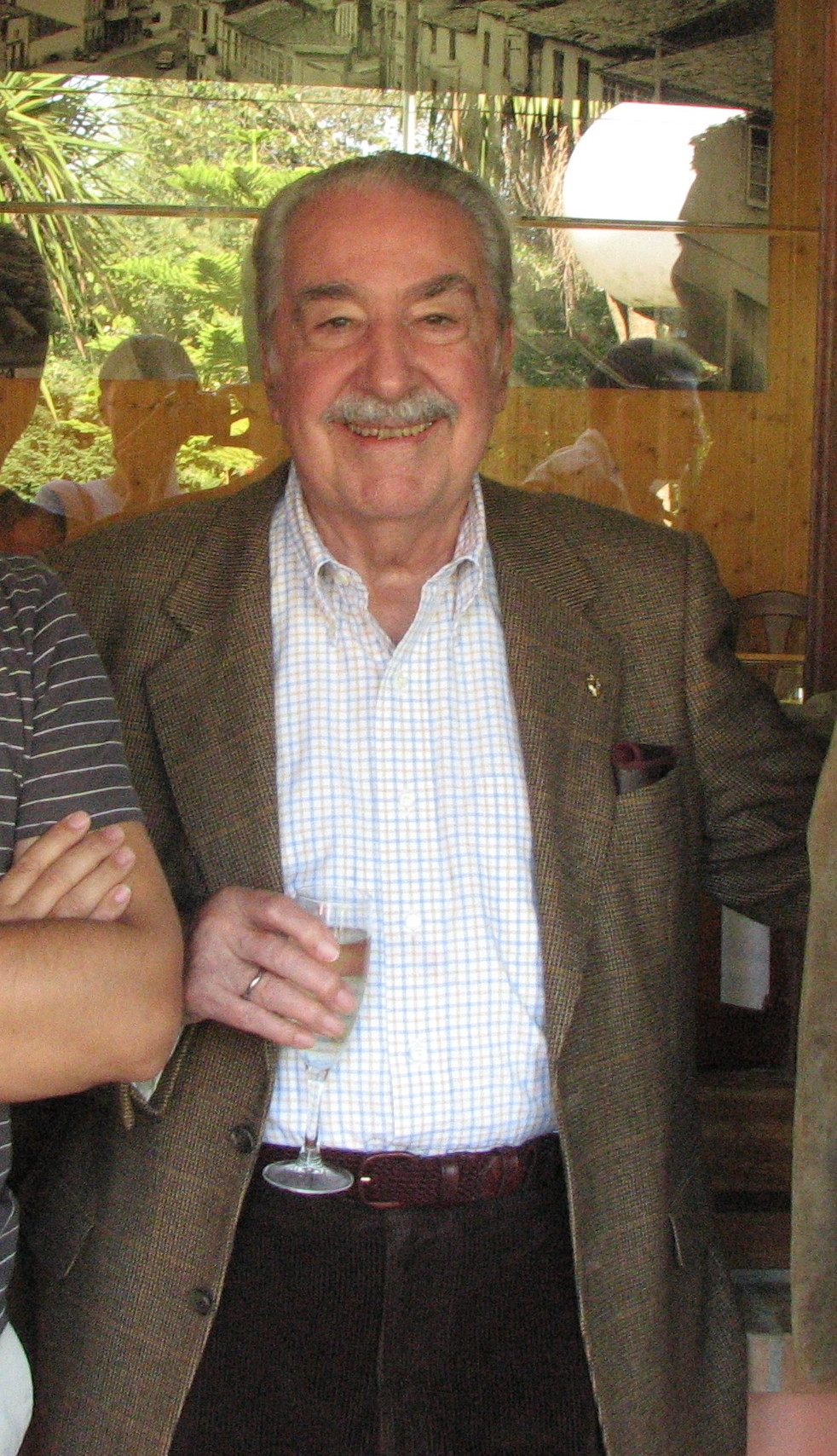
- Born: August 25, 1923; Bogotá, Colombia
- Died: September 22, 2013 (aged 90); Mexico City, Mexico
- Occupations: Poet and novelist
- Writing career
- Genre: Fiction
- Notable work: The Adventures and Misadventures of Maqroll

Álvaro Mutis Jaramillo (August 25, 1923 – September 22, 2013) was a Colombian poet, novelist, and essayist. His best-known work is the novel sequence The Adventures and Misadventures of Maqroll, which revolves around the character of Maqroll el Gaviero. He won the 1991 International Nonino Prize in Italy. He was awarded the 2001 Miguel de Cervantes Prize and the 2002 Neustadt International Prize for Literature.

== Early life ==
Mutis was born in Bogotá and lived in Brussels from the age of two until eleven, where his father, Santiago Mutis Dávila, held a post as a diplomat. They would return to Colombia by ship for summer holidays. During this time Mutis' family stayed at his grandfather's coffee and sugar cane plantation, Coello. For Álvaro Mutis, the impressions of these early years, his reading of Jules Verne and of Pablo Neruda's Residencia en la tierra, and, especially, contact with "el trópico" (the tropics), are the mainspring of his work. Mutis studied high school at the Colegio Mayor de Nuestra Señora del Rosario in Bogotá under the tutelage of the Colombian poet Eduardo Carranza. Although he never finished school, he entered the literary world in Bogotá as a poet, a member of the Cántico group that emerged in 1940s. In 1948 Mutis and Carlos Patiño published a chapbook of poems called La balanza. From 1956 on, he lived in Mexico City, gaining renown there as the result of the positive reviews of his work by Octavio Paz, who was a champion of Mutis' early poetry.

The first important recognition of Álvaro Mutis's work was in 1974: the National Prize for Letters of Colombia.

== Literary career ==
Mutis' poetry was first published in 1948 and his first short stories in 1978. His first novella featuring Maqroll, La nieve del Almirante (The Snow of the Admiral) was published in 1986 and gained him popular and critical acclaim. He has received many literary awards, including the Prix Médicis (France, 1989), Premio Príncipe de Asturias de las Letras (Spain, 1997), Premio Miguel de Cervantes (Spain, 2001), and the Neustadt International Prize for Literature (United States, 2002), for The Adventures and Misadventures of Maqroll, a volume collecting all seven novellas about Maqroll the Gaviero.

Mutis has combined his career as a writer of poetry and prose with a diverse set of non-literary occupations. Like his protagonist Maqroll, Mutis traveled widely in his professional roles including five years as Standard Oil's public relations director and over 20 years as sales manager for Twentieth Century Fox and Columbia Pictures in their Latin American television divisions. Latin Americans first became familiar with his voice when he did the narration for the Spanish-language television version of The Untouchables.

In the 1950s, Mutis spent 15 months in a Mexican prison Palacio de Lecumberri as a consequence of his handling of money that had been set aside for charitable use by Standard Oil. He had been using the money to help his friends who were under threat from the military dictatorship in Colombia, and after he fled to Mexico, the Mexican government bowed to Colombian pressure and had him imprisoned. As soon as the Colombian dictatorship fell, the charges against him were dropped and he was freed. His experience in prison had a lasting influence on his life and work, and is chronicled in the book Diario de Lecumberri.

== Critical reception ==
Mutis' close friend, Nobel Prize-winner Gabriel García Márquez, called him "one of the greatest writers of our time."

Mutis' works are most widely read in Latin America and Europe. Mutis is not well known in the Anglo-Saxon world, probably because he is not easy to categorize. His literary work is not part of what is commonly understood in the American academy as "Latin American Literature". Maqroll, his most well-known character, is of indeterminate origin, nationality, age and physiognomy. He is not evidently from Latin America and does not represent anything particularly Latin American in character. Maqroll is a solitary traveler who brings a stranger's detachment to his encounters and his lovers; he searches for meaning in a time of violence and inhumanity. In this sense some literary critics have compared Maqroll to Sophocles' Oedipus.

== Political views ==
Close friend and relative of Nicolás Gómez Dávila, Mutis described himself as "reactionary, legitimist and monarchist". Labelled as an "old reactionary", he was the coauthor of the 2002 Manifesto Against the Death of the Spirit and the Earth, itself described as an initiative to promote the ideas of the Nouvelle Droite.

== Works ==
- Diario de Lecumberri (1960)
- The Snow Of The Admiral (1986)
- Ilona Arrives with the Rain (1987) (loosely adapted into the 1996 film of the same name)
- The Tramp Steamer's Last Port of Call (1988)
- Un Bel Morir (1989)
- Amirbar (1990)
- Abdul Bashur, Dreamer of Ships (1991)
- Triptych on Sea and Land (1993)
- The Adventures of Maqroll: Four Novellas (1995), consisting of four previously published:
  - The Tramp Steamer's Last Port of Call
  - Amirbar
  - Abdul Bashur, Dreamer of Ships
  - Triptych on Sea and Land
- Summa de Maqroll el Gaviero: Poesía 1948–1997 (1997)
- The Adventures and Misadventures of Maqroll (2002), consisting of seven previously published novellas:
  - The Snow Of The Admiral
  - Ilona Arrives With The Rain
  - Un Bel Morir
  - The Tramp Steamer's Last Port of Call
  - Amirbar
  - Abdul Bashur, Dreamer of Ships
  - Triptych on Sea and Land
- Maqroll's Prayer and Other Poems (2024)

== Awards and honors ==
- 1988 Premio Xavier Villaurrutia
- 1991 International Nonino Prize in Italy.
- 1997 Premio Príncipe de Asturias
- 1997 Reina Sofia de Poesía
- 1997 Grinzane Cavour Prize
- 2001 Miguel de Cervantes Prize
- 2002 Neustadt International Prize for Literature
