= The World Became the World =

Studio album by Premiata Forneria Marconi
- Released: June 1974
- Recorded: November 1973 – February 1974
- Studios: Advision Studios, London; Fonoroma Studios, Milan
- Genre: Progressive rock
- Length: 40:02
- Language: English
- Label: Manticore Records
- Producers: PFM and Claudio Fabi

Premiata Forneria Marconi chronology
L'isola di niente (1974)	The World Became the World (1974)	Chocolate Kings (1975)

The World Became the World is Italian progressive rock band Premiata Forneria Marconi's second international release, an English-language version of their fourth studio album L'isola di niente. It was released in June 1974 on Emerson, Lake & Palmer's Manticore Records label in the US. Like the group's previous English-language album Photos of Ghosts (1973), the band recorded new English lyrics from King Crimson and ELP lyricist Peter Sinfield, not translations of the original Italian lyrics. It was recorded in the same session as L'isola de niente. It features the same tracks (in different order), plus "The World Became the World", an English-language version of the band's first single "Impressioni di Settembre", from the album Storia di un minuto (1972). These were the first recording sessions were the first to feature new bassist Patrick Djivas, who replaced founding member Giorgio Piazza, and remains with the band to this day (as of 2021).

The World Became the World is a progressive rock album which has been described as being more complex than their previous records, additionally incorporating elements of jazz rock. In a retrospective Allmusic review, the album was given a positive review, being deemed PFM's last masterpiece, yet was rated slightly lower than their previous records.

== Composition and critical reception ==
Professional ratings
Review scores
Source	Rating
Allmusic	3.5/5 stars

The World Became the World is a progressive rock album at its core, yet shows greater influences from jazz fusion music. Described as more complex and confusing than their previous records, it ranges from symphonic rock-oriented progressive songs ("Four Holes in the Ground") to jazz rock-influenced pieces ("Have Your Cake and Beat It"). All lyrics are sung in English instead of Italian; "Is My Face on Straight" being the only track sung in the same language on both Italian and international versions. The album contains the presence of long tracks, especially "The Mountain" which is their longest-ever studio track, and makes use of a synthesized choir.

In an Allmusic review, Brude Eder wrote positively on the album, giving it a three-and-a-half out of five star rating, praising the evolution from one album to the next, "PFM were never a group prone to stand still, or repeat themselves from one project to another," even though the album "presented a serious challenge to their existing fans even as it pushed the envelope of their sound." Eder further commented on their shift, "they're much more of a hard rock band on this album, which didn't hurt them in finding an audience in the United States on the tour that followed.". He also praised the presence of new bass player, "Djivas not only brings more of a jazz approach to his instrument, but a louder, harder sound that, in turn, toughens up the contribution of drummer Franz di Cioccio."

== Track listing ==
All tracks are written by Franco Mussida, Flavio Premoli, Mauro Pagani, and Peter Sinfield, except where noted.

Side one
No.	Title	Writer(s)	Italian version	Length
1.	"The Mountain"		"L'isola di niente"	10:46
2.	"Just Look Away"		"Dolcissima Maria"	4:03
3.	"The World Became the World"	Mussida, Pagani, Sinfield*	"Impressioni di Settembre"	4:48

Side two
No.	Title	Writer(s)	Italian version	Length
4.	"Four Holes in the Ground"		"La Luna Nuova"	6:23
5.	"Is My Face on Straight"	Mussida, Premoli, Peter Sinfield		6:40
6.	"Have Your Cake and Beat It"	Mussida, Premoli	"Via Lumière"	7:26

(*) Note: some releases incorrectly include Mogol in the songwriting credits; he wrote the lyrics for the Italian-language version, "Impressioni de settembre."

Bonus tracks (2010 CD version)
No.	Title	Writer(s)	Italian version	Length
7.	"La Carrozza di Hans" (live 1973) (b-side of "The World Became the World" UK single)	Mussida, Pagani		6:00
8.	"Four Holes in the Ground" (unreleased single edit)			3:22
9.	"Celebration" (unreleased 1975 single version)	Mussida, Premoli, Sinfield	"È Festa"	2:37

== Personnel ==
- Franco Mussida – guitars, lead vocals
- Flavio Premoli – keyboards, lead vocals
- Mauro Pagani – violin, flute, vocals
- Patrick Djivas – bass, vocals
- Franz Di Cioccio – drums, percussion, vocals
