= Jet Lag (Premiata Forneria Marconi album) =

Studio album by Premiata Forneria Marconi
- Released: 1977
- Recorded: January 1977 – Kendun Recorders, California, US; February 1977 – Scorpio Sound Studios, London, England
- Genre: Progressive rock
- Length: 42:50
- Languages: English, Italian
- Labels: Asylum Records, Manticore Records
- Producer: Premiata Forneria Marconi

Premiata Forneria Marconi chronology
| Chocolate Kings (1975) | Jet Lag (1977) | Passpartù (1978) |

Professional ratings
Review scores
| Source | Rating |
|---|---|
| Allmusic | 2.5/5 stars |

Jet Lag is the fifth album of the Italian progressive rock band Premiata Forneria Marconi, released in 1977 by Asylum Records in the US and Manticore Records in Europe. This album incorporates the use of fretless bass in the sound and has a jazzier feel in comparison to the band's previous efforts. Four of the five tracks with vocals are sung in English. "Cerco la Lingua" ("I Look for the Language") is the only one sung in Italian. The album is also the first one not featuring founding member Mauro Pagani, who left the band the year before to pursue solo projects.

== Track listing ==
Jet Lag
| No. | Title | Length |
|---|---|---|
| 1. | "Peninsula" | 2:35 |
| 2. | "Jet Lag" | 9:10 |
| 3. | "Storia in 'la'" | 6:25 |
| 4. | "Breakin In" | 4:10 |
| 5. | "Cerco la lingua" | 5:34 |
| 6. | "Meridiani" | 5:57 |
| 7. | "Left-Handed Theory" | 4:11 |
| 8. | "Traveler" | 5:39 |
| Total length: | | 42:50 |

== Personnel ==
- Bernardo Lanzetti – lead vocals
- Franco Mussida – electric & acoustic guitar, 12 string guitar, mandocello, vocals
- Flavio Premoli – organ, piano, Mellotron, harpsichord, Minimoog, vocals
- Gregory Bloch – electric & acoustic violin
- Patrick Djivas – bass, fretless bass, vocals
- Franz Di Cioccio – drums, Minimoog, vocals
