= Chocolate Kings =

Studio album by Premiata Forneria Marconi
- Released: October 1975
- Recorded: June–July 1975
- Genre: Progressive rock
- Length: 36:19
- Label: Manticore
- Producer: Claudio Fabi, PFM

Premiata Forneria Marconi chronology
| The World Became the World (1974) | Chocolate Kings (1975) | Jet Lag (1977) |

Original Studio Album chronology
| L'isola di niente (1974) | Chocolate Kings (1975) | Jet Lag (1977) |

Professional ratings
Review scores
| Source | Rating |
|---|---|
| Allmusic | 3/5 stars |

Chocolate Kings is the sixth album by Italian progressive rock band Premiata Forneria Marconi (also known as PFM). It was released in 1975 by Numero Uno, a division of RCA Records in Italy. It was also released with different cover art by Manticore Records in the UK and Asylum Records in the USA.

It was the first album to include Bernardo Lanzetti (formerly singer of Acqua Fragile) on lead vocals. This was also their first album where the lyrics were originally written in English, as the band felt they were better suited to the music they were making at this time. The lyrics for "From Under" and "Chocolate Kings" were written by Marva Jan Marrow, an American friend of the group, then living in Italy.

== Track listing ==
1. "From Under" (Flavio Premoli, Franco Mussida, Mauro Pagani, Ivan Graziani, Marva Jan Marrow) – 7:29
2. "Harlequin" (Premoli, Pagani) – 7:48
3. "Chocolate Kings" (Mussida, Pagani, Marrow) – 4:39
4. "Out of the Roundabout" (Mussida, Pagani) – 7:53
5. "Paper Charms" (Mussida, Pagani) – 8:30

== Personnel ==
- Bernardo Lanzetti – vocals
- Franco Mussida – guitar, voice
- Flavio Premoli – keyboards, vocals
- Mauro Pagani – flute, violin, vocals
- Patrick Djivas – bass, vocals
- Franz Di Cioccio – drums, vocals
