= Photos of Ghosts =

Studio album by Premiata Forneria Marconi
- Released: October 1973
- Recorded: 1972–1973
- Genre: Progressive rock
- Label: Manticore
- Producer: Peter Sinfield

Premiata Forneria Marconi chronology
Per un amico (1972)	Photos of Ghosts (1973)	L'isola di niente (1974)

Professional ratings
Review scores
Source	Rating
Allmusic	4.5/5 stars

Photos of Ghosts is the third studio album and the first English language record by the Italian progressive rock band Premiata Forneria Marconi, also known as PFM. Released in the U.S. in October 1973, it was the first album by an Italian rock group to appear on the American charts. The album peaked at No. 180 on the Billboard 200 albums chart in November 1973.

PFM was discovered by Greg Lake of Emerson, Lake & Palmer while on an Italian tour. The band was signed to Manticore Records, a label created by ELP, soon after. Five of seven songs on this album have new lyrics (not translations) written by former King Crimson lyricist Peter Sinfield. Sinfield produced the new recording and mixing at Command Studios in London.

The best known song from this album, "Celebration", had significant airplay on FM Album-oriented rock stations across the U.S. and Canada. It was originally recorded in 1971 as "È festa" for PFM's first album, Storia di un minuto. The album includes a new instrumental titled "Old Rain". Photos of Ghosts includes the entirety of PFM's second album Per un amico (1972). Four of those five recordings have new English lyrics. "Mr. 9 'til 5" was originally an instrumental titled "Generale". "Il Banchetto" ("The Banquet") is a remixed version of the Italian track from Per un amico.

== Track listing ==
All tracks are written by Franco Mussida, Flavio Premoli, Peter Sinfield, except where noted.

Side 1
No.	Title	Writer(s)	Italian version	Length
1.	"River of Life"		"Appena un po'"	7:00
2.	"Celebration"		"È festa"	3:53
3.	"Photos of Ghosts"		"Per un amico"	5:23
4.	"Old Rain"	Premoli		3:41

Side 2
No.	Title	Writer(s)	Italian version	Length
5.	"Il Banchetto" (remix of Per un amico version)	Mauro Pagani, Mussida, Premoli		8:36
6.	"Mr. 9 'til 5"		"Generale!"	4:11
7.	"Promenade the Puzzle"		"Geranio"	7:29

== Personnel ==
- Franco Mussida – vocals, electric and acoustic guitar, 12 string guitar, theorbo, mandocello
- Flavio Premoli – spinet, keyboards, Hammond organ, Minimoog, Mellotron, tubular bells, harpsichord, piano, vocals
- Mauro Pagani – flute, piccolo, violin, vocals
- Giorgio Piazza – bass guitar, vocals
- Franz Di Cioccio – drums, percussion, vocals
- Peter Sinfield - English lyrics, producer

== Charts ==
Chart (1973)	Peak position
Australia (Kent Music Report)	55
US Billboard 200	180
