= In Concerto - Arrangiamenti PFM =

1979 live album by Fabrizio De André

Fabrizio De André in Concerto - Arrangiamenti PFM
- Album cover

Live album by Fabrizio De André and PFM
- Released: 1979
- Recorded: Teatro Tenda, Florence; Palasport Casalecchio (currently Unipol Arena), Bologna, 13-14-15-16 January 1979
- Studio: The Manor Mobile
- Genre: Rock
- Length: 46:16
- Label: Ricordi
- Producer: Fabrizio De André, PFM

Fabrizio De André in Concerto - Arrangiamenti PFM, Vol. 2°
- Album cover for the second volume

Live album by Fabrizio De André and PFM
- Released: 1980
- Recorded: Teatro Tenda, Florence; Palasport Casalecchio (currently Unipol Arena), Bologna, 13-14-15-16 January 1979
- Genre: Rock
- Length: 38:30
- Label: Ricordi
- Producer: Fabrizio De André, PFM

Fabrizio De André in Concerto - Arrangiamenti PFM ["In Concert—Arrangements by PFM"] is a 1979 live album by Fabrizio De André featuring Italian progressive rock band Premiata Forneria Marconi, also known as PFM, as his backing band, recorded during their successful 1979 tour of Italy and Europe. Built on powerful, complex and carefully crafted rock arrangements, either by single band members or by the band as a unit, the album marked a significant stylistic and musical departure for De André, whose output up to that point had always employed acoustic-based, folk arrangements, occasionally branching into pop but never overtly using rock structures and instrumentation. Upon release, the album became immediately very popular and paved the way for other Italian singer-songwriters (notably Francesco Guccini) for their own transition from a folk style into a more rock-oriented one. The album was followed by a Volume 2 the next year, recorded during the same shows.

== Background and overview ==
De André and the members of PFM had known each other since 1969, when the band, then known as Quelli ("Those ones"), featuring Teo Teocoli as their lead vocalist and mainly active as session musicians, had played on his album La buona novella. According to reminiscences told to De Andre's widow Dori Ghezzi and Florentine actor David Riondino (who opened the 1979 shows as a comedic singer-songwriter) by drummer Franz Di Cioccio and bass player Patrick Djivas, in the 2020 rockumentary Fabrizio De André & PFM: il concerto ritrovato (i.e. The Newly Found Concert, as described in §Fabrizio De André & PFM: il concerto ritrovato), the band and De André met up again after a PFM concert in Tempio Pausania; De André, who had been living in Sardinia, namely in Gallura, since late 1975, was in the audience and, after the show, visited the band members in their dressing rooms and told them that he had been very impressed by the "density" of their music (in Di Cioccio's words) and by the sheer amount of musicianship involved in the band's improvisations. Di Cioccio reciprocated the compliment by telling De André that he had been following the latter's output for a long time before they even met, for La buona novella; Di Cioccio claimed to be especially fond of De André's older songs, such as "La canzone di Marinella". He and Djivas talked De André into adding "a lease of new life" to his old songs through "rockier" arrangements. The Genoan singer-songwriter, who at the time was also suffering from a lack of motivation and stimuli, enthusiastically accepted the band's proposal, and told them he would perform the arrangements on the road with them, as a tour, which was later immortalized by the two-volume live album.

All of the tour dates were very successful in terms of ticket sales and of popularity, although some of De Andre's early "purist" fans viewed his move into rock as selling out, or simply as De André "pandering" to a more contemporary music style in order to have a broader appeal. However, music critics at the time, comparing the tour to Bob Dylan "going electric" in 1965, lauded the tour itself, and its resulting live albums, for their great originality, and praised De André's audacity in going beyond the commonly accepted "minimal" attitude of 1970s singer-songwriters (according to which the number of instruments which were played alongside the singing, and the quality of the playing itself, had a much lesser importance than the lyrics) and "dressing up" his songs in beautiful musical arrangements, which thus became just as relevant as his lyrics.

== Track listing ==
=== Fabrizio De André in Concerto ===
1. "Bocca di Rosa" ["Rose-mouth"] (De André; main arrangers: Franco Mussida and Flavio Premoli) - 4:32
2. "Andrea" (De André/Massimo Bubola; main arranger: Mussida) - 5:24
3. "Giugno '73" ["June '73"] (De André; main arrangers: Patrick Djivas, Premoli) - 4:24
4. "Un giudice" ["A judge"] (De André/Giuseppe Bentivoglio/Edgar Lee Masters [lyrics], De André/Nicola Piovani [music]; main arranger: Premoli) - 3:23
5. "La guerra di Piero" ["Piero's war"] (De André; arranged by PFM) - 3:30
6. "Il pescatore" ["The Fisherman"] (De André [lyrics], Gian Piero Reverberi/Franco Zauli [music]; main arrangers: Di Cioccio, Premoli) - 3:58
7. "Zirichiltaggia" [literally "Lizards' den" in Gallurese] (De André/Bubola; main arranger: Lucio Fabbri) - 2:27
8. "La canzone di Marinella" ["Marinella's song"] (De André; main arranger: Mussida) - 4:02
9. "Volta la carta" ["Turn the page"] (De André/Bubola; main arrangers: Premoli, Fabbri) - 3:56
10. "Amico fragile" ["Frail friend"] (De André; main arranger: Mussida) - 9:35

=== Fabrizio De André in Concerto, Vol. 2 ===
1. "Avventura a Durango" [a translation of Bob Dylan's "Romance in Durango", from his 1976 album Desire] (De André/Bubola [Italian lyrics], Bob Dylan/Jacques Levy [music]; main arrangers: Mussida, Premoli) - 5:20
2. "Presentazione" [Band and crew intros, by Franz Di Cioccio] - 3:42
3. "Sally" (De André/Bubola; arranger: Roberto Colombo) - 5:05
4. "Verranno a chiederti del nostro amore" ["They will come to ask you about our love"] (De André/Bentivoglio [lyrics], De André/Piovani [music]; main arranger: Premoli) - 5:06
5. "Rimini" (De André/Bubola; arranged by PFM, main arranger: Premoli) - 5:00
6. "Via del Campo" [literally "Field Street" - a street in Genoa] (De André/Enzo Jannacci; arranger: Roberto Colombo) - 2:44
7. "Maria nella bottega del falegname" ["Mary in a carpenter's workshop"] (De André [lyrics], De André/Reverberi [music]; main arranger: Premoli) - 4:37
8. "Il testamento di Tito" ["Titus's testament"] (De André [lyrics], De André/Corrado Castellari [music]; arranged by PFM, main arrangers: Mussida, Premoli) - 6:34

=== 2012 bonus tracks ===
The 2012 re-release of both albums, within the 16-CD live box set I concerti ["The concerts"] by Sony Music, features four bonus tracks entitled "Contestazione Roma PalaEUR" (1-4) [i.e. "Jeering in Rome PalaEUR"], which consist in various excerpts from a 1980 show in Rome's PalaLottomatica (formerly PalaEUR); in the show, De André performed the same setlist as in the live albums, but he was verbally attacked, jeered and booed throughout by some of the local audience, who, as several other early fans of De Andre's, viewed the coupling between a singer-songwriter and a rock band as almost sacrilegious, implying a sell-out of the former; large groups of people shouted out "sell-out, sell-out" and chanted "idiot, idiot" between songs. The singer responded (in the second excerpt, track 10 on the CD) by claiming that there are no such things as good ideals and bad ideals, but that ideals are seen as good or bad depending on them being accepted by a majority or a minority of people. Di Cioccio, on his own turn, defended the combination on the ground that PFM were merely functioning as De Andre's backing band for that tour, as opposed to a full-fledged rock band with their own personality; he then proceeded to introduce the band members, as he did on Volume 2. Some footage showing the audience from the Rome show was also included in the first section of the 2020 documentary film Fabrizio De André & PFM: Il concerto ritrovato, described below. The film also includes a scene from the same show, referred to by Di Cioccio in an interview excerpt, where De André, fittingly with the audience's reactions, sarcastically sings a line from "Amico fragile" as "And while I was sitting amongst your fuck-offs..." instead of ending it with the correct word, "goodbyes".

== Song changes ==
With PFM imprinting their own progressive rock stamp on all songs, all of the arrangements are notably different from their respective original studio recordings. Some of the changes are subtle, others more radical.

=== Fabrizio De André in Concerto ===
- "Bocca di Rosa", originally from Volume 1, is given a new intro and a new solo by guitarist Franco Mussida and keyboardist Flavio Premoli, with additional violin passages by violinist Lucio "Violino" Fabbri. The tarantella rhythm on the original recording is removed, and the song is played instead as a fast shuffle in 12/8.
- "Andrea", originally from Rimini, is played faster than the original, and Massimo Bubola's passionately Mediterranean instrumental melody (functioning as an interlude between verses) is more prominent.
- "Giugno '73" adds a new intro based on Patrick Djivas's bass, but remains otherwise faithful to its original recording on Volume 8; only, keyboards are more prominent and the instrumental interlude is played by Franz Di Cioccio on crotales.
- "Un giudice" is played very slightly slower than its original recording on Non al denaro non all'amore né al cielo and it is given a Cajun feel by Premoli, who adds a new solo on accordion.
- "La guerra di Piero" is relatively unchanged from its original recording on Volume 3; the song's military march feel is emphasized by Di Cioccio's percussion and additional keyboards by guest musician Roberto Colombo, one of which is played with a harpsichord timbre.
- "Il pescatore", originally released in 1970 as a standalone single, features one of the most striking changes: the simple folk arrangement in the original version is transformed into a rousing rock anthem, featuring heavy drums, percussion (both engaged in a short solo/break towards the end), electric and acoustic guitars, keyboards and violin. The hook, originally consisting in a whistled melody, is joyously sung as a choir ("La-la-la-la, la-la, la-la..." etc.) by the entire band - except for bass player Patrick Djivas, who does not sing.
- "Zirichiltaggia" is, again, played much faster than its original recording on Rimini. Fabbri emphasizes the song's bluegrass feel by playing a longer fiddle solo. The harmony vocals, originally sung by Bubola as one of the two shepherds comically arguing in the song, are here sung by Mussida. In his introduction to the song, De André stated that living in Gallura for four years meant that he at least managed to learn the local language - which allowed him to write the song.
- "La canzone di Marinella" is transposed from the 4/4 beat of its original recording, on Volume 3, to a 6/8 beat, and the arrangement, led by piano and acoustic guitar, is softer and calmer than the original - thus adding even more sweetness to De André's already sugar-coated, fairytale-like lyrical treatment of Marinella's rape and tragic death.
- In "Volta la carta", the Irish gig elements of the original recording, on Rimini, are given more prominence, with the main interludes being played on violin and keyboards. Mussida sings Dori Ghezzi's part from the original version, and the final operatic tenor high note is omitted, played instead as a held note on the violin. Di Cioccio starts the song by singing "Branca, Branca, Branca!", to which the band responds "Leòn, Leòn, Leòn!" - a reference to the main theme from the 1966 film For Love and Gold.
- "Amico fragile" is much longer than its original recording on Volume 8, with a new intro by Premoli and two new guitar solos by Mussida. De André sings the second verse an octave higher than the original, and in a much more impassioned tone, highlighting the overall resentful attitude of the whole lyric.

=== Fabrizio De André in Concerto, Volume 2 ===
- "Avventura a Durango" is a slightly faster adaption of the original recording on Rimini, which was itself faithfully adapted from the Dylan recording. Although the general tone of De André's delivery remains lightweight, he sings with a more direct and focused tone than on the studio version. During the Neapolitan chorus, De André harmonizes with Colombo (in lieu of Bubola) and Di Cioccio punctuates it with a disco beat, still being aware of the rhythmical irregularities in the main song.
- In "Sally", the interlude melody, played on acoustic guitars in the original studio version on Rimini, is complemented by Colombo's prominent Moog synth (Colombo arranged the song by himself). In the last verse, De André sings: "Mia madre mi disse: «Non devi giocare con gli Svizzeri nel bosco»" ["My mother told me: «You shouldn't play with the Swiss people in the woods»"], instead of the correct word zingari (i.e. gypsies, used at the time in Italy as a slightly deprecating epithet for Romani people). Years later, he attributed this mistake to his being intoxicated on stage, as he used to drink half a bottle of whisky immediately before each show in order to win his severe stage fright.
- In "Verranno a chiederti del nostro amore", a new piano introduction is added; the orchestration on the original recording, on Storia di un impiegato, is simplified and played on keyboards and synths.
- The choir singing the titular word in "Rimini" is here sung by the entire band - except for Djivas - with Fabbri taking the highest note in a falsetto voice; Premoli adds a new synth solo at the end. After performing the song, De André states that the atmosphere of 1960s Rimini, which inspired him, was depicted much better in «I Vitellini» by Felloni, referring to the 1965 film I Vitelloni by Federico Fellini. The unintentional spoonerism was later referred to by De André as another mistake due to intoxication.
- "Via del Campo", another Colombo arrangement, is led by the guest keyboardist's harpsichord-like synth. He also adds an instrumental interlude in order to modulate between the second and third verses. (In the original recording, on the 1967 Volume 1 album, the modulation is carried out on guitars.)
- In "Maria nella bottega del falegname" the choral parts, representing the townspeople, are sung by Di Cioccio, Mussida and Fabbri in unison, without any harmonizations and, unlike the original recording on La buona novella, obviously without any female vocals. Premoli adds a new synth solo at the end. Before the song starts, Di Cioccio acts out the role of the carpenter by shouting to "Mary" in Milanese.
- Similar to "Il pescatore" on the 1979 release, "Il testamento di Tito", originally from La buona novella, features a full-on rock performance by the whole band, including heavy, prominent drums, acoustic and electric guitars, an electric violin part by Fabbri, a new guitar intro by Mussida and a new synth solo by Premoli. De André's vocal delivery is, again, slightly angrier in tone than the detached attitude of his original vocals on the studio recording.

==== Legacy ====
De André was immediately appreciative of the new slant given by PFM to his songs (especially the older ones), to the point that he kept using identical arrangements to PFM's in all of his subsequent tours, up to his very last concerts in 1998, regardless of the musicians he played with. When asked in 1991 by his longtime lighting and theatrical director Pepi Morgia why he kept using the PFM versions instead of his own ones, De André half-jokingly replied: "Belin, because they're so damn good that nobody's ever done any better - and nobody ever will, most of all myself!"

== Personnel ==
- Fabrizio De André - Acoustic guitar, lead vocals

=== PFM ===
- Franz Di Cioccio - Drums, percussion, crotales, marimba, vocals
- Patrick Djivas - Bass guitar, acoustic bass guitar on "Via del Campo"
- Franco Mussida - Electric guitar, acoustic guitar, vocals
- Flavio Premoli - Yamaha electric piano, Micromoog, Minimoog, Elka strings, 12-string guitar on "Avventura a Durango", vocals
- Roberto Colombo - Fender-Rhodes piano, Polymoog, Minimoog, percussion, vocals on "Avventura a Durango"
- Lucio "Violino" Fabbri - Violin, 12-string guitar on "Il testamento di Tito", vocals

(Note: At the time, Colombo and Fabbri were not official members of PFM or any other bands; they had joined the band as guests for the duration of the tour, with Fabbri replacing former member Mauro Pagani. While Fabbri stayed with the band throughout the 1980s and from 1997 to the present, Colombo left them in 1980 to pursue a career as a music producer and arranger, which he still is as of 2024.)

=== Crew ===
- All songs arranged by PFM (Main arrangers as detailed above.)
- Produced by Fabrizio De André and PFM
- Recorded live in Florence and Bologna with The Manor Mobile Recording Studio from Virgin Records, London.
- Recording engineer - Peter Greenslade
- Recording assistants - Chris Blake, Ken Capper
- Mixed in February 1979 at "Il Mulino" Recording Studio, Milan, by Franco Mussida
- Mix assistant - Franco Pellegrini
- Front-of-house and stage monitors engineer - Piero Bravin
- All photos by Guido Harari

==== Credits for 2007 reissue ====
- Remixed by Paolo Iafelice at Adesiva Discografica Studio, Milan.
- Mastered by Antonio Baglio at Nautilus Mastering Studio, Milan.
- "Cooperative" supervision by Dori Ghezzi, Franz Di Cioccio and Patrick Djivas.
- Art direction and all photos by Guido Harari.
- Graphic design by Guido Harari and Roberto Capussotti.
- Thanks to Yukio Takahashi from Sonopress GmbH for providing the original live tapes.

== Reissues and artwork ==
The two albums were remastered and reissued several times by Ricordi, BMG and Sony Music, starting from 1995. In 2007, sound engineer Paolo Iafelice, who took care of field recordings for De André's 1994 album Anime salve and later worked as a technical engineer on his posthumous releases (as well as on live recordings by De André's firstborn son Cristiano), undertook an extensive remix of both albums, by carrying them through a process of "de-mastering" - i.e. going back to the original 1979 tapes and removing all subsequent layers of remastering to obtain a flat transfer of the tapes themselves, then carefully mixing them anew in order to bring out previously obscured details. Also, when originally recorded, some of the songs were sped up for unknown reasons; Iafelice's remix brought all recordings back to their correct speed.

=== Artwork ===
Expert concert photographer Guido Harari took all the photos for the artwork. The front cover of both albums is a shot of the audience in Florence taken from above the stage, without De André (his chair is empty); the photo has an orange-red tint on the first 1979 release, and a light green tint on Volume 2. The gatefold cover of the first album includes more onstage pictures of single members, and the album also features a booklet consisting of black-and-white stills of De André and band members relaxing and having fun backstage. The booklet includes, on its second-to-last page, a poem by De André entitled "Blues di altre date" ["Blues from other dates"], which he never set to music, addressing an imaginary girl and carrying a dedication to Djivas. (According to the musician himself in an interview excerpt within the 2020 film Fabrizio De André & PFM: il concerto ritrovato, De André wrote the poem immediately after he had an angry altercation with Djivas about the latter's playing; retreating himself into a backstage corner, as far as possible from Djivas, De André wrote silently for five minutes, then he tore the page off and gave it to Djivas. Following his explanation, Djivas reads out the poem in his slightly French-accented Italian.) Two short handwritten parodies by De André are used as captions on three photos:

- A picture of De André seemingly asleep on the floor next to a heater is captioned with a parody of the first two lines from "Il pescatore": "Col culo esposto a un radiatore / s'era assopito il cantautore..." ("With his ass exposed to a heater, the singer-songwriter had fallen asleep...").
- Two ugly-looking pictures of Colombo and Fabbri holding their identity cards are captioned with a parody of the first verse from "Delitto di paese" (De André's 1965 translation of "L'assassinat", a Georges Brassens original from 1962): "Non tutti all'ombra di un ideale / sbocciano i fiori del male; / due terroristi malgrado tutto / ci abbiamo anche noi nel gruppo..." ("It's not always in the shadow of an ideal / that the flowers of evil blossom; / even we, in spite of everything / have got two terrorists in our band...")

The 2007 reissue features a reworked sepia-toned band photo by Harari on the front cover, overlaid with "Fabrizio De André & PFM" in a large white type and "In Concerto" in a smaller dark brown type. The booklet within the reissue features all of Harari's photos from the previous issues, and more previously unreleased ones.

== 40th anniversary tribute concert ==
To celebrate the 40th anniversary of the original 1979 live album, a tribute concert took place at Verona Arena on 26 September 2019. It featured Cristiano De André on lead vocals, accompanied by the current members of PFM (i.e. Di Cioccio, Djivas and Fabbri - Premoli and Mussida having left the band respectively in 2005 and 2015), plus several guest musicians. The show consisted in a faithful live re-creation of the album and of its second volume, both in their original running order.

== Fabrizio De André & PFM: il concerto ritrovato ==
In late 2019, writer, film director and former politician Walter Veltroni was informed by a friend of his, independent filmmaker Piero Frattari, that the latter's single-camera shot of the 3 January 1979 Genoa show had been painstakingly restored from three 40-year-old Betamax tapes which had been forgotten and left languishing at the bottom of a videotape archive, and the video quality was now up to par. In the intervening months, Frattari set about restoring the audio as well, in order for its quality to match the live album, and some slightly different performances of songs such as "Un giudice" and "La guerra di Piero" were discovered by Veltroni, who was handed the restored tapes by Frattari. Veltroni came up with the idea of talking to the members of PFM about their memories of the tour: Di Cioccio and Djivas were filmed while riding on a train to Genoa and talking to Dori Ghezzi and actor/comedian David Riondino, the opening act from the original tour; Mussida and Premoli, both of which were PFM members in 1979 but had since departed from the band, were filmed on their own in separate locations. (Lucio Fabbri and Roberto Colombo, who performed as guests in the original tour, were unavailable for filming.) Photographer Guido Harari and Genoan music archivist Antonio Vivaldi, named after the famed Baroque composer but unrelated to him (although he admits that a bizarre twist of fate made him a music lover), were also filmed: Harari shares his memories of shooting De André and the band members both onstage and backstage, while Vivaldi reminisces about being in the audience at the same show in Genoa filmed by Frattari and later ripping a poster for the show off a wall; he states that he has kept the poster in his personal collection for 40 years. All of the new footage shot by Veltroni was edited together to form the first part of a rockumentary entitled Fabrizio De André & PFM: il concerto ritrovato [The Newly Found Concert], the second part of which consists of Frattari's restored film in its entirety (more than one hour of footage), including such classics of De André's as "Marinella", "Via del campo" and "Bocca di rosa". (A clip where Mussida plays his guitar intro to "Marinella" segues immediately into the actual full performance from the show.) The opening scene of the film consists of an aerial zoom shot, moving downwards, of "L'Agnata", the De André family cottage in Gallura, accompanied by an off-screen narration by Ghezzi: she states that De André had always been wary of technology since he moved to Sardinia, then proceeds to tell a humorous story about De André's first mobile phone, which she convinced him to buy around the same time as the PFM tour; after the first two months, he received a bill of nineteen million lire, roughly equivalent to 9,500 euros, because somebody had cloned his phone, and decided to bury it at the bottom of a fig tree in his garden, jokingly celebrating its funeral; Ghezzi ends her narration by wondering whether the phone is still there. At the end of the film, immediately before the end credits roll, the aerial shot is repeated and moves to a gardener (Premoli), who digs a hole in the same spot and retrieves the phone, an old Motorola model.

The opening and closing credits feature a guitar composition titled "Stay", by jazz guitarist Alessandro Di Virgilio, as the only piece of "score" (other than De André and PFM's music), which also appears at the end of Antonio Vivaldi's scene. The film was released in theatres on 18 February 2020, on what would have been De Andre's eightieth birthday, and was critically acclaimed as well as a minor box office hit. A DVD release followed during the same year; the DVD adds three bonus song to the concert setlist.
