= L'isola di niente =

Studio album by Premiata Forneria Marconi
- Released: March 1974
- Genre: Progressive rock
- Length: 35:29
- Languages: Italian and English
- Label: Numero Uno
- Producer: Claudio Fabi

Premiata Forneria Marconi chronology
Photos of Ghosts (1973)	L'isola di niente (1974)	The World Became the World (1974)

Original Studio Album chronology
Per un amico (1972)	L'isola di niente (1974)	Chocolate Kings (1975)

L'isola di niente ("The Isle of Nothing") is the fourth studio album by Italian progressive rock band Premiata Forneria Marconi, released in 1974. Like the group's previous albums, it is sung in Italian and performed well in Italy. An English version of the album, The World Became the World, was recorded in the same session. It features the same track list along with an English version of the band's first single "Impressioni di Settembre". English lyrics were written by Peter Sinfield.

L'isola di niente is a progressive rock album which has been described as being more complex than their previous records, additionally incorporating elements of jazz rock. In a retrospective Allmusic review, the album was given a positive review, being deemed PFM's last masterpiece, yet was rated slightly lower than their previous records. Tracks such as "La Luna Nuova" and "Dolcissima Maria" continue to be performed in their live set.

== Composition and critical reception ==
Professional ratings
Review scores
Source	Rating
Allmusic	4/5 stars

L'isola di niente is a progressive rock album at its core, yet shows greater influences from jazz fusion music. Described as more complex than their previous records, it ranges from symphonic rock-oriented progressive songs ("La Luna Nuova") to jazz rock-influenced pieces ("Via Lumiere"). The lyrics are also sung in Italian, with the exception of the second track, "Is My Face on Straight?". The album continues the presence of long tracks, especially "L'isola di niente" which is 10:48 minutes long, and makes use of a synthesized choir.

In an Allmusic review, François Couture wrote positively on the album, giving it a four out of five star rating, and labelling it a "masterpiece" and "one of the first Italian progressive rock wave's finest records", despite deeming it more "confusing" than its predecessors and "more of an acquired taste".

== Track listing ==
All tracks are written by Franco Mussida, Mauro Pagani, and Flavio Premoli, except where noted.

Side one
No.	Title	Writer(s)	Length
1.	"L'isola di niente"		10:48
2.	"Is My Face on Straight"	Mussida, Premoli, Peter Sinfield	6:41

Side two
No.	Title	Writer(s)	Length
3.	"La luna nuova"		6:26
4.	"Dolcissima Maria"		4:08
5.	"Via lumière"	Mussida, Premoli	7:23

== Personnel ==
- Franco Mussida – guitars, lead vocals
- Flavio Premoli – keyboards, lead vocals
- Mauro Pagani – violin, flute, vocals
- Patrick Djivas – bass, vocals
- Franz Di Cioccio – drums, percussion, vocals
