= Acqua Fragile (album) =

Studio album by Acqua Fragile
- Released: 1973
- Venue: Milan
- Studio: Fonorama Studios
- Genre: Progressive rock
- Length: 36:53
- Language: English
- Label: Numero Uno (record label)
- Producer: Claudio Fabi and PFM

Acqua Fragile chronology
Acqua Fragile (1973)	Mass Media Stars (1974)

Acqua Fragile is the first album by the Italian progressive rock band Acqua Fragile. The album was released by Numero Uno (record label) in 1973. The album is one of the few Italian progressive rock albums sung entirely in English.

== Reception ==
Dag Erik Asbjørnsen in Scented gardens of the mind compared Acqua Fragile's sound to Genesis, Yes and Crosby, Stills & Nash, combining Lanzetti's nasal voice with "majestic guitar licks" and three-part vocal harmonies. Francesco Mirenzi in Rock progessivo italiano commented that the album "... is noted for the good cohesion of the compositions, close to the most peaceful moments of Gentle Giant."

Augusto Croce in Italian prog said: "A good album with nice west-coast multi-vocal influences mixed with an English prog sound." Jerry Lucky in The progressive rock files said: "Sounds like early Genesis. Two LPs [Acqua Fragile and Mass Media Stars] produced by PFM and it shows in their sound."

== Personnel ==
=== Musicians ===
- Bernardo Lanzetti: vocals, guitar
- Gino Campanini: electric guitar, acoustic guitar, vocals
- Piero Canavera: drums, acoustic guitar, vocals
- Franz Dondi: bass
- Maurizio Mori: keyboards, vocals

=== Others ===
- Gaetano Ria: engineer
- Claudio Fabi and PFM: producers
- Bernardo Lanzetti: lyrics
- Piero Canavera: music

== Track listing ==
All tracks are written by B. Lanzetti (lyrics) and P. Canavera (music).

Side one
No.	Title	Length
1.	"Morning Comes"	7:25
2.	"Comic Strips"	3:59
3.	"Science Fiction Suite"	5:57

Side two
No.	Title	Length
4.	"Song from a Picture"	4:11
5.	"Education Story"	4:16
6.	"Going Out"	2:59
7.	"Three Hands Man"	8:06

== Release history ==
Year	Region	Label	Format	Catalog
1973	Italy	Numero Uno	LP	DZSLN 55656
1981	Japan	Seven Seas	LP	K22P-113
1990	Japan	Crime	CD	KICP 2051
1991	Europe	Numero Uno	CD	ND 74853
1993	Japan	Crime	CD	KICP 2722
2003	Italy	Numero Uno	CD	74321980552
2004	Japan	BMG	CD	BVCM-37505
2008	Italy	Numero Uno/Sony BMG	CD	88697343682
2011	UK	Esoteric Recordings	CD	ECLEC 2277
2016	Italy	Numero Uno/Sony/RCA	LP	88985305711
2020	Italy	Numero Uno/Sony/RCA	LP	DZSLN 55656
2022	Italy	Sony Music/Numero Uno	LP	19439914591
