= Nuvole barocche =

Compilation album by Fabrizio De André
- Released: 1969
- Recorded: 1961, 1963, 1964, 1966
- Genre: Folk
- Length: 28:04
- Label: Roman Record Company

Fabrizio De André chronology
Volume 3 (1968)	Nuvole barocche (1969)	La buona novella (1970)

Professional ratings
Review scores
Source	Rating
AllMusic	3.5/5 stars

Nuvole barocche is an album released by Italian singer-songwriter Fabrizio De André. It is a compilation of tracks from his first singles (which appear for the first time on LP) and from his LPs: Tutto Fabrizio De André and Volume 1.

== Track listing ==
All songs written by Fabrizio De André, except where indicated.

1. "Nuvole barocche" (De André, Gianni Lario, Carlo Stanisci) (2:26)
2. "E fu la notte" (De André, Franco Franchi, Carlo Stanisci) (2:03)
3. "Valzer per un amore" (Gino Martinuzzi, De André) (2:35)
4. "Per i tuoi larghi occhi" (2:33)
5. "La Canzone dell'Amore Perduto" (3:40)
6. "Carlo Martello ritorna dalla battaglia di Poitiers" (De André, Paolo Villaggio) (5:19)
7. "Il fannullone" (De André, Paolo Villaggio) (3:37)
8. "Geordie" (traditional) (2:04)
9. "Delitto di paese" (Georges Brassens, translation by De André) (3:52)
