= Volume 3 (Fabrizio De André album) =

Studio album / Compilation album by Fabrizio De André
- Released: 1968
- Recorded: 1968
- Genre: Folk, Chanson
- Length: 27:19
- Label: Bluebell Records (BBLP 33); Produttori Associati (PA/LP 33)
- Producer: Gian Piero Reverberi; Giorgio Agazzi

Fabrizio De André chronology
Tutti morimmo a stento (1968)	Volume 3 (1968)	La buona novella (1969)

Singles from Vol. 3°
- 1. "La canzone di Marinella/Amore che vieni, amore che vai" Released: 1968; 2. "La ballata del Michè/La guerra di Piero" Released: 1968; 3. "Il gorilla/Nell'acqua della chiara fontana" Released: 1969

Professional ratings
Review scores
Source	Rating
Allmusic	4.5/5 stars

Volume 3 (Vol. 3°) is the third album released by Italian singer-songwriter Fabrizio De André. It was first issued in 1968 on Bluebell Records and is De André's last studio release on Bluebell. Of the songs contained in the album, only four were previously unreleased; the other ones are re-recordings of tracks originally issued on 45-rpm records during De André's early stint with the Karim label.

== Track listing ==
All tracks are written by Fabrizio De André, except where noted

Side one
No.	Title	Lyrics	Music	Length
1.	"La canzone di Marinella"			3:20
2.	"Il gorilla"		Georges Brassens	2:59
3.	"La ballata dell'eroe"			2:35
4.	"S'i' fosse foco"	Cecco Angiolieri		1:14
5.	"Amore che vieni, amore che vai"			2:50

Side two
No.	Title	Music	Length
6.	"La guerra di Piero"		3:04
7.	"Il testamento"		3:47
8.	"Nell'acqua della chiara fontana"	G. Brassens	2:20
9.	"La ballata del Michè"		2:55
10.	"Il re fa rullare i tamburi"		1:55

1971 reissue tracklist
No.	Title	Lyrics	Music	Length
1.	"La canzone di Marinella"			3:20
2.	"Il pescatore"			2:21
3.	"La ballata dell'eroe"			2:35
4.	"S'i' fosse foco"	Cecco Angiolieri		1:14
5.	"Amore che vieni, amore che vai"			2:50
6.	"La guerra di Piero"			3:04
7.	"Il testamento"			3:47
8.	"Nell'acqua della chiara fontana"		G. Brassens	2:20
9.	"La ballata del Michè"			2:55
10.	"Il re fa rullare i tamburi"			1:55

== The songs ==
- "La canzone di Marinella" became De André's first hit as soon as Mina made a re-recording of it, after De André's original (as featured here) had made no impact on the charts. Its lyrics, in a very sweetened, sugar-coated style, tell the story (mentioned as true in the opening line) of the rape and murder of a young girl; the lyrics, as De André revealed in a 1991 Rai 1 interview with Vincenzo Mollica, are based on the actual murder of a 16-year-old girl during the early 1960s in Genoa, identified by the local papers as a prostitute; her killer, who was never apprehended, dumped her corpse in the Tanaro river.

=== Alternate explicit lyrics to "La canzone di Marinella" ===
The fifth verse of "Marinella", as De André originally wrote it, was notably more explicit in its depiction of the actual rape act: "It started with a caress and a little kiss / then he moved straight onto a blowjob; / and under the threat of a straight razor / you were forced to spit and swallow." However, by the time he went into the studio to record the song, De André was well aware of how strict Italian censorship was in seizing upon even the tiniest hints of explicitness (having previously experienced censorship on his earlier song "Carlo Martello") and decided not to record the explicit verse at all; he rewrote it as "There were kisses and there were smiles / then it was only cornflowers, / which, as your eyes were looking at the stars, / saw your skin shivering to the wind and the kisses," which made a better fit to the overall "sweet" mood of the lyrics. However, De André did include the alternate verse in his earliest live performances, starting from his very first concert residency in 1975 at the famous "Bussola" nightclub in Viareggio. It can be heard in a March 15, 1975 recording of his, as featured in the 2012 release La Bussola e Storia di un impiegato: il concerto 1975-'76; on the same recording, the live audience can be heard reacting enthusiastically to the lyrical change, as they did not expect the song (which was already popular by then) to have any "alternate" lyrics at all. On the other hand, a critic for Corriere della Sera, reviewing the opening night, unceremoniously referred to the performance as a "porn version of Marinella". During the 1975 residency, De André performed the song in a very similar arrangement to the studio version; after Franco Mussida from PFM reworked the song into a melancholic 6/8 ballad for the band's historical 1979 concert tour with De André, the singer dropped the explicit verse and went back to its "radio-friendly" equivalent.

- "La ballata dell'eroe" ["The hero's ballad"] is a sad lament about the futility of war, describing a soldier who, moved by his ardent desire for military glory, acts on his own beyond the received orders and gets killed as a result. De André, with his usual sarcastic irony, notes that "all that's left of him is a medal in his memory." The song, originally recorded in 1961 as the B-side of what De André saw as his first "proper" 7-inch release on Karim (the A-side being "La ballata del Michè", below), was also recorded by Luigi Tenco in 1962.
- "Il gorilla" ["The gorilla"] is a translated version of Georges Brassens' song "Le Gorille". It is about a gorilla which, after escaping from his cage, loses his virginity after deciding to rape a judge instead of an old woman. The story is ultimately used to convey a message against death penalty.
- "S'i' fosse foco" ["If I were fire"] is based on the LXXXVI satirical sonnet of the Rime (Rhymes), written by Italian medieval poet Cecco Angiolieri. In his poem, Cecco jocularly describes the huge devastation he would cause to the world and its inhabitants if he were fire, wind, water, God, the Pope or an emperor, as well as the death of both his parents, which he also would cause if he were Death (or Life - in which case, he would stay away from his parents). The ambiguously dark mood of the poem is, however, offset by its final three lines, where Cecco shoots his ultimate jest: "If I were Cecco like I am and was / I'd take for myself all the youngest and fairest women; / the lame and ugly ones - I'd leave them to others." The poem is set by De André to a joyous mazurka tune.
- "Amore che vieni, amore che vai" ["You, love, who comes and who goes"] is a melodic and regretful song focusing on a recurring theme of De André's, the mutability of love. The singer argues that no matter how strong is a love affair, or how passionately love may be expressed by a person, everything is bound to change, or even to disappear, within a short time - such as a month or a year.
- "La guerra di Piero" ["Piero's war"] is another of De André's best-known songs, one of the few he included in almost every live show of his - from the very first ones in 1975 to the very last one in 1998. Set on a strongly marked rhythm of a military march, but at a very slow, almost funereal pace, "La guerra di Piero", like "La ballata dell'eroe", is a strong condemnation of war and a statement of the absolute uselessness of all war efforts. In the lyrics, Piero (vaguely modeled on the very young US soldiers in the Vietnam War, but, as De André clarified later, not intended to be a specific soldier in any specific war) is marching through a field when he sees an enemy - a man who "was in an identical mood to [him], but his suit was of another colour". As Piero nervously hesitates on where and how to shoot the man, he is killed himself and dies in the field, described as a cornfield.
- "Il testamento" ["The Will"], not to be confused with the later song "Il testamento di Tito", is a bitterly ironical song about a man drafting his last will and testament, but being sure, at the same time, that everyone he names will be disappointed. What the man "bequeaths" is, in fact, either trivial things or abstract ones - indeed, the "will" is just an excuse for the man to scorn and insult all of the people who, in turn, have scorned him in his lifetime. He concludes by stating that "when you die, you always die alone." Here, for the first time in his career, De André uses a bright tarantella arrangement, with an acoustic guitar and an accordion, which he would use again in several later occasions.
- "Nell'acqua della chiara fontana" ["In the water of a clear spring"] is a translated version of Georges Brassens's song "Dans l'eau de la claire fontaine". It is another song that uses the medieval troubador song template seen in "Carlo Martello"; its inclusion on the album, together with "S'i' fosse foco" and "Il re fa rullare i tamburi" (below), contributed to the recurring presentation of De André as a medieval revivalist, in the Italian press of the era.
- "La ballata del Michè" ["Mickey's ballad"] is a waltz about a murderer who, sentenced to 20 years in jail, gives himself his own death penalty by committing suicide. De André delivers the lyrics in his usual neutral, almost-resigned tone, which by then was becoming a trademark of his. The song was inspired by an actual news event, and includes a number of elements common to De André songs: a tolerance, understanding and respect of the common man and his circumstances, along with a critique of both the law and the church for certain of their hard-line and merciless principles.
- "Il re fa rullare i tamburi" ["The king has his drums rolling"] is a translated version of a French traditional song from the 14th century, "Le roi a fait battre tambour", which had been recorded in its native language by Yves Montand in 1959.
- "Il pescatore" ["The Fisherman"], released as a standalone single in 1970, was included as a bonus track in all re-releases of Volume 3, starting from the first.
