= Per un amico =

Studio album by Premiata Forneria Marconi
- Released: November 1972
- Recorded: 1972
- Genre: Progressive rock
- Length: 34:09
- Language: Italian
- Label: Numero Uno
- Producer: Premiata Forneria Marconi

Premiata Forneria Marconi chronology
Storia di un minuto (1972)	Per un amico (1972)	Photos of Ghosts (1973)

Original studio album chronology
Storia di un minuto (1972)	Per un amico (1972)	L'isola di niente (1974)

Professional ratings
Review scores
Source	Rating
Allmusic	4.5/5 stars

Per un amico ("For a Friend") is the second album from the Italian progressive rock band Premiata Forneria Marconi. Released in 1972 by all the initial members of the group, it is considered their breakthrough album that put them on the map. The album remains popular among progressive rock fans throughout Italy, and the group will usually still perform all tracks on the album today.

The album, still progressive at heart, additionally borrows influences from a variety of rock genres and subgenres. In an Allmusic review, Per un amico was lauded as a classic within the genre and deemed on par with the work of the biggest progressive rock acts of the 1970s. All of the songs from this album would appear either in their original form or re-recorded with vocals in English on PFM's English-language album Photos of Ghosts.

== Composition and critical reception ==
Per un amico is rooted within the progressive rock genre, yet includes elements of music ranging from avant-garde to hard rock. The lyrics in the album are sung in Italian.

Robert Taylor, in an Allmusic review, gave the album four-and-a-half stars out of five and a positive review. Deeming it, along with its predecessor, a classic, he claimed that it was as fine as the music of major groups such as Genesis, Yes, or King Crimson, and concluded, "Always intelligent, but without pretension, this is progressive rock in its most literal definition".

Classic Rock Magazine wrote: "Reminiscent of Genesis circa Selling England by the Pound, PFM prove that prog isn’t the exclusive province of posh public schoolboys."

Rolling Stone listed the album at 19th in their "50 Greatest Prog Rock Albums of All Time" list.

== Track listing ==
All tracks are written by Mauro Pagani, Franco Mussida and Flavio Premoli, except where noted.

Side one
No.	Title	Length
1.	"Appena un po'"	7:44
2.	"Generale" (Mussida, Premoli)	4:18
3.	"Per un amico"	5:24

Side two
No.	Title	Length
1.	"Il banchetto"	8:39
2.	"Geranio"	8:04

== Personnel ==
- Franco Mussida – vocals, electric & acoustic guitar, 12 string guitar, theorbo, mandocello
- Flavio Premoli – spinet, keyboards, Hammond organ, Minimoog, Mellotron, tubular bells, harpsichord, piano, vocals
- Mauro Pagani – flute, piccolo, violin, vocals
- Giorgio Piazza – bass, vocals
- Franz Di Cioccio – drums, percussion, vocals
