= Mass Media Stars =

Studio album by Acqua Fragile
- Released: 1974
- Venue: Milan
- Genre: Progressive rock
- Length: 37:43
- Language: English
- Label: Ricordi
- Producer: Claudio Fabi and PFM

Acqua Fragile chronology
| Acqua Fragile (1973) | Mass Media Stars (1974) | A New Chant (2017) |

Mass Media Stars is the second album by the Italian progressive rock band Acqua Fragile. The album was released by Dischi in 1974. The album is sung entirely in English, as was the band's first album Acqua Fragile, but it also received a release in the United States which was unusual for an album by an Italian progressive group.

== Reception ==
Dag Erik Asbjørnsen in Scented gardens of the mind compared Acqua Fragile's sound to Genesis, Yes and Crosby, Stills & Nash, combining Lanzetti's nasal voice with "majestic guitar licks" and three-part vocal harmonies.

Augusto Croce in Italian prog commented that the album was similar to their first, but with slightly better production. Jerry Lucky in The progressive rock files said: "Sounds like early Genesis. Two LPs [Acqua Fragile and Mass Media Stars] produced by PFM and it shows in their sound."

== Personnel ==
=== Musicians ===
- Bernardo Lanzetti: vocals, electric guitar, acoustic guitar, 8-string guitar
- Gino Campanini: electric guitar, mandolin, vocals
- Piero Canavera: drums, percussion, acoustic guitar, vocals
- Franz Dondi: bass
- Maurizio Mori: keyboards

=== Others ===
- Gaetano Ria: engineer
- Claudio Fabi and PFM: producers
- Guido Harari: design, photography
- Bernardo Lanzetti: lyrics
- Piero Canavera: music

== Track listing ==
All tracks are written by B. Lanzetti (lyrics) and P. Canavera (music)

Side one
| No. | Title | Length |
|---|---|---|
| 1. | "Cosmic Mind Affair" | 7:19 |
| 2. | "Bar Gazing" | 5:06 |
| 3. | "Mass-Media Stars" | 6:53 |

Side two
| No. | Title | Length |
|---|---|---|
| 4. | "Opening Act" | 5:40 |
| 5. | "Professor" | 6:49 |
| 6. | "Coffee Song" | 5:56 |

== Release history ==
Discogs lists 23 versions of Mass Media Stars including two unofficial (bootleg) versions. Versions have been released on LP, CD, cassette and 8-track cartridge from 1974 to 2021, starting with the original LP (SMRL 6150) and cassette (RIK 76150) versions released by Dischi in 1974.

== Plagiarism ==
In 2018 Bernardo Lanzetti and Acqua Fragile accused the rapper Busta Rhymes of plagiarism because in "Genesis", the song that gives the title to his 2001 album, he used a sampling of "Cosmic Mind Affair", taken from Mass Media Stars, without declaring it and indeed attributing it to himself.
