= Stati di immaginazione =

Studio album by Premiata Forneria Marconi
- Released: 20 November 2006
- Genre: Progressive rock
- Length: 46:14
- Label: Sony BMG

Premiata Forneria Marconi chronology
Dracula Opera Rock	Stati di immaginazione	35 Anni e un Minuto

Stati d'immaginazione is the sixteenth studio album by the Italian progressive rock band Premiata Forneria Marconi, released in 2006. It was distributed in a double edition containing a CD and a DVD; the latter contains eight shorts which, in concert, are presented to the public on the big screen. The images of the videos and the music of the album were conceived as a multimedia work, based on a project by Iaia De Capitani, manager of the group.

== Track listing ==
All tracks are written by Premiata Forneria Marconi.

No.	Title	Length
1.	"La terra dell'acqua (Di Cioccio/Djivas/Mussida/Tagliavini)"	8:13
2.	"Il mondo in testa (Di Cioccio/Djivas/Mussida/Tagliavini)"	3:55
3.	"La conquista (Di Cioccio/Djivas/Mussida)"	6:26
4.	"Il sogno di Leonardo (Mussida)"	6:43
5.	"Cyber Alpha (Di Cioccio/Djivas/Mussida)"	4:27
6.	"Agua azul (Di Cioccio/Djivas/Mussida)"	3:53
7.	"Nederland 1903 (Di Cioccio/Djivas/Mussida)"	3:20
8.	"Visioni di Archimede (Di Cioccio/Djivas/Mussida)"	8:57
Total length:		46:14

== DVD ==
The DVD's track list is similar to the CD. It also features images from cities, landscapes, cartoons and black and white scenes from the African native people.

== Personnel ==
- Franz Di Cioccio - Drums, Percussion, Vocals
- Patrick Djivas - Bass, Fretless Bass, Flute
- Franco Mussida - Electric, Classical and Acoustic Guitars, Vocals
- Lucio Fabbri - Violin, Keyboards and Guitar
- Gianluca Tagliavini - Keyboards
