= Caronte =

Caronte is the Italian, Portuguese and Spanish name of Charon, the boatman of Hades, appearing in numerous versions of the legend of Orpheus:

- Caronte in Caccini's Euridice
- Caronte in Peri's Euridice
- Caronte in Monteverdi's L'Orfeo
- Caronte in Rossi's Orfeo
- Caronte in Landi's La morte d'Orfeo.

It may also refer to:

- Caronte, 1971 album by The Trip.
- Caronte, 2020 Spanish television series.
