= La buona novella =

Studio album by Fabrizio De André
- Released: November 1970
- Recorded: 1970
- Genre: Folk
- Length: 35:27
- Languages: Italian, Latin
- Label: Produttori Associati
- Producer: Roberto Dané

Fabrizio De André chronology
| Vol. 3° (1968) | La buona novella (1970) | Non al denaro non all'amore né al cielo (1971) |

Alternative cover
- Alternative cover of the original release

Professional ratings
Review scores
| Source | Rating |
|---|---|
| Allmusic | 5/5 stars |

La buona novella is the fourth studio album by Italian singer-songwriter Fabrizio De André, released in 1970. Its plot revolves around the New Testament apocrypha.

== Development ==
The LP is a concept album inspired by several apocryphal gospels mainly the Gospel of James and the Arabic Infancy Gospel.
Producer Roberto Dané had the original idea for the album and submitted it to Antonio Casetta of Produttori Associati, who in turn advised him to discuss the idea with De André, who was stuck in a creative rut at that time. After a year of work, the album was ready.
Narration in this album, in accordance with the apocrypha, emphasizes the human traits of traditional biblical characters (e.g. Joseph) and focuses more on some minor characters (e.g. Titus and Dumachus, the two thieves crucified along with Jesus). De André himself saw the album as "one of [his] best works, if not the best".

== Track listing ==
- All lyrics written by Fabrizio De André.
- All songs composed and arranged by Fabrizio De André and Gian Piero Reverberi, except where noted.

All tracks are written by Fabrizio De André, except where noted.

Side one
| No. | Title | Length |
|---|---|---|
| 1. | "Laudate dominum" | 0:22 |
| 2. | "L'infanzia di Maria" | 5:01 |
| 3. | "Il ritorno di Giuseppe" | 4:07 |
| 4. | "Il sogno di Maria" | 4:06 |
| 5. | "Ave Maria" | 1:54 |

Side two
| No. | Title | Music | Length |
|---|---|---|---|
| 6. | "Maria nella bottega del falegname" | | 3:15 |
| 7. | "Via della Croce" | | 4:33 |
| 8. | "Tre madri" | | 2:56 |
| 9. | "Il testamento di Tito" | De André, Corrado Castellari | 5:51 |
| 10. | "Laudate hominem" | | 3:26 |

== The songs ==
=== "Laudate Dominum" ===
("Praise God")

The short opener "Laudate dominum" ("Praise the Lord"), sung by an operatic (church-like) choir, introduces the first song, which is about Mary's childhood.

=== "L'infanzia di Maria" ===
("Mary's Infancy")

Mary is taken away from her mother at the age of 3 and lives a segregated existence in a temple until, at age 12, she is banished by the priests when "her virginity is tinged with red", making her unpure. Afterwards, a search is organized among the unwed to find a man for the child to marry, regardless of her will, effectively "making a lottery out of a virgin's body".
The chosen man is Joseph, an old carpenter, who is saddened by the decision, deeming that Mary has been given in marriage to "a too-old heart that is already resting".
Nevertheless, the carpenter takes his newly-wed bride to his home, and subsequently leaves to attend works outside of Judea.

=== "Il ritorno di Giuseppe" ===
("Joseph's Return")

Four years after his departure, Joseph is shown on his way back home on a donkey, crossing the desert just as the first stars appear in the sunset sky. As he draws closer to Jerusalem, he takes out a wooden doll he made for Mary, thinking how she missed playing and toys in her early childhood. Upon his arrival, he is greeted by a crying Mary, who he sees is pregnant with a child. As explanation, she tells her husband about a strange dream she had had.

=== "Il sogno di Maria" ===
("Mary's Dream")

The scene of Mary's story takes place in the temple, where she used to be visited by an angel in her dreams, who taught her new prayers. One night, he "turns her arms into wings", and takes her with him to a place far away, where he starts speaking to her. Meanwhile, the voices of the priests in the temple start to carry Mary away from the dream and, as she sees the angel "turn into a comet", she is awakened by the noises coming from the streets. Though confused, the echo of the angel's words is still lingering in her mind: "They will call him the Son of God". She then realizes that she has become pregnant.
As her story ends, she starts crying again, and Joseph sympathetically caresses her forehead.

=== "Ave Maria" ===
("Hail Mary")

The song represents Mary's transition into womanhood as she becomes a mother, a mix of both "joy and sorrow, in the season that lightens the visage".
It is also a tribute to motherhood, to those who are "women for a day and then mothers forever".

=== "Maria nella bottega del falegname" ===
("Mary in the Carpenter's Workshop")

From the joyful atmosphere of the previous song, the story is now taken in a carpenter's workshop, where Mary asks him what he is working on, and if he is making crutches for the survivors of war. He replies that he is actually making three crosses, "two for those who deserted to sack, the biggest one for the one who taught to desert war".
When Mary asks him who is going to be upon the crosses, he says that the crosses "will see the tears of Titus and Dumachus" and "the biggest one will embrace your son".

=== "Via della Croce" ===
("Way of the Cross")

The song describes reactions of the people watching Jesus as he carries the cross towards the Calvary.
The first ones, the fathers of the children killed by Herod, insult him and mock him, saying how they would rather kill him themselves. His disciples follow him silently, overwhelmed by terror, fearing that exposing themselves would lead to the same fate. The priests who condemned him are now satisfied, consider him "dead enough" to be sure that he's indeed human. Lastly, the two thieves are described as having "a place of honor" but, unlike the priests, not pleased in any way by Jesus' pain. In the end, the only ones left under the crosses are the mothers of the three condemned.

=== "Tre madri" ===
("Three Mothers")

As the three condemned stand crucified, their respective mothers stand under the crosses to comfort them.
The two women tell Mary that's she has no reason to cry so much, since she knows that her son will "return to life on the third day", while theirs will never return. The heart-rending song ends with Mary's words: "Had you not been the son of God, I'd still have you as my son".
Sardinian singer Elena Ledda recorded a cover of the song with Sardinian lyrics, titled "Sas tres mamas", for the 1995 tribute album Canti randagi.

=== "Il testamento di Tito" ===
("Titus's Testament")

The song revolves entirely around Titus, one of the thieves. While on the cross, he explains the Ten Commandments from his point of view, saying that even though he didn't respect any of them, he never felt any sorrow or guilt, because the events of life, which the Commandments don't take into account, drove him to do it.
Then, before dying, he tells his mother how, through the sorrow for the fate of "this dying man", he has learned love.

=== "Laudate hominem" ===
("Praise the Man")

The last song has an antithetical title to that of the opener and is a reprise of its theme.
A choir who represents the poor tells about how Jesus is to be praised not as a God, but as a son of man, therefore a brother of mankind.

== Criticism ==
The album was heavily criticized at the time of its release due to its themes. During the students' protests period, many regarded it as conservative, anachronistic and generally uncompatible with the idea of social change promoted by the protests. When De André was asked why he would make an album about Jesus Christ at a time like that, he answered that "Jesus is the greatest revolutionary of all history". He also explained that the album is "an allegory, a comparison between the best and most reasonable principles of the protest movement and the spiritually wider ones of a man, born 1968 years before, who got himself nailed to a cross in the name of universal brotherhood and egalitarianism, against any abuse of power".

== Release history ==
| Year | Label | Format | Catalog number |
|---|---|---|---|
| 1970 | Produttori Associati | stereo LP | PA/LPS 34 |
| 1970 | Produttori Associati | stereo LP | PA/LPS 34 |
| 1970 | Produttori Associati | cassette | PA 1009 |
| 1970 | Produttori Associati | 8-track | PA 9004 |
| 1970 | Ricordi | stereo LP | SMRL 6230 |
| 1970 | Ricordi | cassette | RIK 76498 |
| 1973 | Ricordi | stereo LP | ORL 8918 |
| 1983 | Ricordi | cassette | ORK 78918 |
| 1987 | Ricordi | CD | CDRML 6230 |
| 1991 | Ricordi | CD | CDOR 8918 |
| 1995 | BMG-Ricordi | CD | CDMRL 6498 |
| 2002 | BMG-Ricordi | CD | 74321974452 |
| 2009 | Sony BMG | CD | 88697454682 |
| 2010 | Sony Music | gold-coloured vinyl LP | 8869715151 |
| 2011 | Sony Music | double 45 rpm vinyl record | 886979498211 |

== Remake ==
In 2010, Italian progressive rock group Premiata Forneria Marconi released a remake of the album, titled A.D. 2010 - La buona novella; subtitled Opera apocrifa ["Apocryphal work"], the album features contemporary re-arrangements of De André's songs with the addition of some new, original instrumental sections. The whole of PFM also played (in their first line-up) on the original album, as session musicians.

== Personnel ==
- Fabrizio De André - Guitars, Vocals
- Franco Mussida - Guitars
- Andrea Sacchi - Guitars
- Franz Di Cioccio - Drums
- Giorgio Piazza - Bass
- Flavio Premoli - Organ
- Mauro Pagani - Flute
- Angelo Branduardi - Violin, Viola

== Bibliography ==
- Salvarani, Brunetto; Semellini, Odoardo (2019). De André. La buona novella: La vera storia di un disco capolavoro (in Italian). Milano: Edizioni Terra Santa. ISBN 9788862406352.
