= Joe Vescovi =

Italian musician (1949–2014)

Joe Vescovi (1 January 1949 – 28 November 2014) was an Italian progressive rock keyboard player, considered as one of the prominent musicians of the 1970s Italian progressive rock scene, best known for his work in bands The Trip and Dik Dik. A self-proclaimed imitator of Keith Emerson, Vescovi was popular for his histrionic stage presence and eccentric clothing as much as for his virtuoso keyboard playing.

== Biography ==
Born in Savona, Vescovi founded his first rock band, The Lonely Boys, at the age of 17. He played with this band in Germany and the Netherlands without achieving much success. After returning to Italy, he played for a while in a band called Toto e i Tati, led by Toto Cutugno. In the late 1960s, Vescovi joined the progressive rock band The Trip from Turin, replacing Ritchie Blackmore, who had left the band to join Deep Purple. Blackmore later considered Vescovi to be the keyboardist for his band Rainbow, although David Stone was chosen instead. Vescovi is often called the leader of The Trip, both because of the heavy influence of his keyboard playing style on the sound of the band and his frontman role in live performances. This became more true after Pino Sinnone left and was replaced in 1972 by Furio Chirico, the band became a trio, orienting their styles towards more progressive rock. After The Trip, Vescovi joined the Italian prog rock band Acqua Fragile and later Dik-Dik, one of the most popular Italian pop-rock bands ever. He also collaborated with Umberto Tozzi and founded two minor bands of his own, Tarrot [sic], who were hired by ex-Premiata Forneria Marconi Franz Di Cioccio to play the musical score for the 1982 film Attila flagello di Dio, and Night Fudge.
