= Storia di un minuto =

Studio album by Premiata Forneria Marconi
- Released: January 1972
- Recorded: 1971
- Genre: Progressive rock
- Length: 34:25
- Language: Italian
- Label: Numero Uno

Premiata Forneria Marconi chronology
Storia di un minuto (1972)	Per un amico (1972)

Storia di un minuto ("One minute story") is the first album of the Italian progressive rock band Premiata Forneria Marconi. It was recorded in Milan and released by the Numero Uno division of RCA Records in Italy. The album topped the Italian album charts after one week from the release – the first time occurrence in the Italian charts up until then.

Storia di un minuto is a progressive rock album with traces of symphonic rock, and borrows influences from a range of genres. Contemporary reviews deemed the album as one of the greatest debuts in the history of prog rock. It includes re-recorded versions of "Impressioni di settembre" b/w "La carrozza di Hans" (previously released as a single). Other songs like "È festa" (later re-titled as "Celebration") and "Dove... quando..." went on to become pillars of the band's performances.

== Composition and critical reception ==
Professional ratings
Review scores
Source	Rating
Allmusic	4.5/5 stars

The album follows the lines of progressive rock and symphonic rock, yet it includes elements of other genres, ranging from classical and folk to jazz music. Nevertheless, the style is also eclectic, going from pop-oriented melodies ("Dove... quando" and "Impressioni di settembre") to more heavy rock-sounding tracks ("È festa").

Storia di un minuto was acclaimed in a retrospective Allmusic review, where it was given four-and-a-half out of five stars. In it, Robert Taylor called it an "excellent recording", comparing the album's creativity to fellow British bands, and finally deeming it as "one of the best progressive rock debuts in history [...] essential to any serious collection".

== Track listing ==
Side one
No.	Title	Writer(s)	Length
1.	"Introduzione"	Franco Mussida	1:09
2.	"Impressioni di settembre"	Mussida, Mogol, Mauro Pagani	5:44
3.	"È festa"	Mussida, Pagani	4:52
4.	"Dove... quando... (parte 1)"	Mussida, Pagani	4:10

Side two
No.	Title	Writer(s)	Length
1.	"Dove... quando... (parte 2)"	Mussida, Pagani	6:01
2.	"La carrozza di Hans"	Mussida, Pagani	6:45
3.	"Grazie davvero"	Mussida, Pagani	5:51

== Personnel ==
- Franco Mussida – electric & acoustic guitar, 12 string guitar, mandocello, lead vocals (tracks 1,2,4 and 6), backing vocals
- Flavio Premoli – organ, piano, Mellotron, harpsichord, Minimoog, lead vocals (tracks 3 and 7), backing vocals
- Mauro Pagani – flute, piccolo, violin, backing vocals
- Giorgio Fico Piazza – bass, backing vocals
- Franz Di Cioccio – drums, Moog synthesizer, gadgets, backing vocals

== Release history ==
Year	Region	Label	Format	Catalog
1972	Italy	Numero Uno	LP	ZSLN 55055
1989	Europe	RCA	CD	ND 74059
2000	Italy	BMG	CD	74321 765422
2003	Japan	BMG (Japan)	CD	BVCM-37423
2006	South Korea	Sony BMG Music Entertainment (Korea); Sony BMG Music Entertainment (Korea)	CD	SB30149C; 82876 85413 2
