= Acqua Fragile =

Italian progressive rock band

- Origin: Parma, Italy
- Genres: Progressive rock Symphonic rock
- Years active: 1971–1975; 2013–present
- Labels: Numero Uno; Ricordi; BMG; Esoteric; Ma.Ra.Cash
- Members: Bernardo Lanzetti; Franz Dondi; Piero Canavera; Stefano Pantaleoni; Claudio Tuma; Rossella Volta
- Past members: Gino Campanini; Maurizio Mori; Joe Vescovi

Acqua Fragile is an Italian progressive rock band, active from 1971 to 1975 and from 2013 to the present. The band was established in the city of Parma. Bernardo Lanzetti, leader and vocalist of the band, is best known for his work with Premiata Forneria Marconi and has played in many other progressive rock acts, including neoprogressive band Mangala Vallis.

== History ==
The first lineup of the band, named "Gli Immortali" ("The Immortals") comprised Bernardo Lanzetti (vocals), Gino Campanini (electric guitar), Piero Canavera (drums), Maurizio Mori (keyboards) and Franz Dondi (bass guitar). Of those, Dondi was the most established musician, as he had formerly played in another small band, "I Moschettieri" ("The Musketeers") which had released a single and opened for the Rolling Stones.

At the beginning of the 1970s, Gli Immortali were noticed by members of PFM (one of the most successful italian rock bands of the times), and PFM's manager Franco Mamone adopted Lanzetti's group as well, which had by then changed its name to "Acqua Fragile". With Mamone's help, Acqua Fragile were hired to open for prominent progressive rock acts such as Soft Machine, Uriah Heep and Gentle Giant.

In 1973 they released their first album Acqua Fragile on Numero Uno.

This debut work was clearly inspired by British progressive rock bands Genesis and Gentle Giant, and had English lyrics, something quite unusual for Italian bands at the time, even more so since the album was not released outside of Italy. Even Lanzetti's voice sounded very much like that of Peter Gabriel.

The next album Mass Media Stars (1974) was released in both Italy and the United States, a move that was intended to leverage PFM's recent success overseas. At about the same time the new keyboardist Joe Vescovi (formerly with The Trip) moved in. Shortly thereafter Lanzetti, leader and vocalist of the band, left to join PFM for their next album Chocolate Kings. The band replaced Lanzetti with Roby Facini (former member of Top 4 and Dik Dik), but this did not revive the success of Acqua Fragile. The band eventually split in 1975.

After the breakup, Acqua Fragile members pursued independent projects. Lanzetti has had a relatively successful solo career and later joined neoprogressive group Mangala Vallis. Dondi and Canavera played in several groups (including a Beatles tribute band). In 2004 Dondi founded a new group, called "Acqua Fragile Project", as a revival act in honor of Acqua Fragile; the project ended in 2006. Lanzetti, Canavera and Dondi reformed as Acqua Fragile in 2013, and released the albums A New Chant in 2017 and Moving Fragments in 2023.

== Membership ==
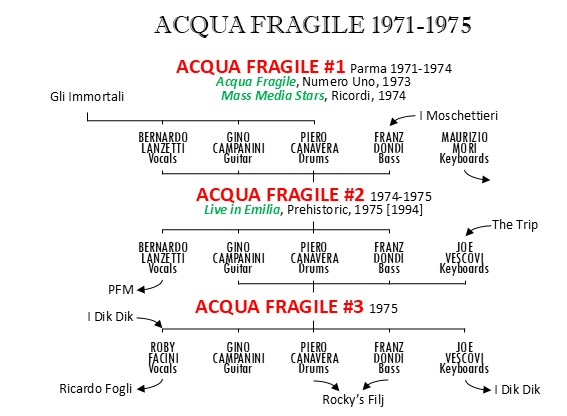
Membership tree of Acqua Fragile 1971-1975

=== 1971–1974 ===
- Bernardo Lanzetti: vocals
- Gino Campanini: guitar
- Piero Canavera: drums
- Franz Dondi: bass
- Maurizio Mori: keyboards

=== 1974–1975 ===
- Bernardo Lanzetti: vocals
- Gino Campanini: guitar
- Piero Canavera: drums
- Franz Dondi: bass
- Joe Vescovi: keyboards

=== 1975 ===
- Roby Fancini: vocals
- Gino Campanini: guitar
- Piero Canavera: drums
- Franz Dondi: bass
- Joe Vescovi: keyboards

=== 2013–2017 ===
- Bernardo Lanzetti: vocals
- Piero Canavera: drums
- Franz Dondi: bass

=== 2023 ===
- Bernardo Lanzetti: vocals
- Piero Canavera: drums
- Franz Dondi: bass
- Claudio Tuma: guitar
- Stefano Pantaleoni: keyboards
- Rossella Volta: backing vocals

== Discography ==
=== Albums ===
- Acqua Fragile (Numero Uno 1973 (DZSLN 55656); reissued on LP in 2016, 2020 and 2022, and on CD in 1991, 2003 and 2008)
- Mass Media Stars (Ricordi 1974 (SMRL 6150); reissued on LP in 1991 and CD in 1991 and 2003)
- Live in Emilia – Spring 75 (Prehistoric Records 1994 (PR 03) on CD: live 1975 unofficial recording)
- A New Chant (Esoteric Recordings 2017 (EANTCD 1069) on CD)
- Moving Fragments (Ma.Ra.Cash Records 2023 on LP (MRCLP041) and on CD (MRC 122))

== Bibliography ==
- Pintelli, Andrea; Enrile, Athos; De Negri, Angelo (2022). Racconti e schegge di Acqua Fragile - L'intensa vita di Gino Campanini (in Italian). Rome: Arcana. p. 308. ISBN 978-8-89277-141-3. OCLC 1373558259.
- Rizzi, Cesare; Beretta, Fulvio (1993). Enciclopedia del rock italiano (in Italian). Milan: Arcana. pp. 640 (see p. 191). ISBN 978-8-87966-022-8. OCLC 30452949.
