= Tutto Fabrizio De André =

Compilation album by Fabrizio De André
- Released: 1966
- Recorded: 1963–1966
- Genre: Folk
- Length: 29:39
- Language: Italian
- Label: Karim (KLP 13)

Fabrizio De André chronology
| Tutto Fabrizio De André (1966) | Nuvole barocche (1968) |

Fabrizio De André chronology
| Tutto Fabrizio De André (1966) | Vol. 1° (1967) |

Reissue cover
- Front cover of the 1968 reissue titled La canzone di Marinella.

Tutto Fabrizio De André is the first full-length release by Fabrizio De André and his first release credited with his full name (in earlier releases, he was credited as just "Fabrizio"). It is also his last release on Karim label.
It was released in 1966 as an anthology of his previous single releases from 1963 on. His very first songs, "Nuvole barocche" and "E fu la notte", which De André regarded only as "youth sins" and didn't consider part of his own discography, were not included in the album.

== Track listing ==
All tracks are written by Fabrizio De André, except where noted.

Side one
| No. | Title | Length |
|---|---|---|
| 1. | "La ballata dell'amore cieco (o della vanità)" (B-side of "La canzone dell'amore perduto", 1966) | 2:50 |
| 2. | "Amore che vieni, amore che vai" (B-side of "Geordie", 1966) | 2:40 |
| 3. | "La ballata dell'eroe" (B-side of "La guerra di Piero", 1964) | 2:40 |
| 4. | "La canzone di Marinella" (B-side of "Valzer per un amore", 1964) | 3:11 |
| 5. | "Fila la lana" (1965) | 2:22 |

Side two
| No. | Title | Writer(s) | Length |
|---|---|---|---|
| 6. | "La città vecchia" (1965) | | 3:21 |
| 7. | "La ballata del Michè" (B-side of "Il testamento", 1963) | De André, Clelia Petracchi | 2:44 |
| 8. | "La canzone dell'amore perduto" (1966) | | 3:40 |
| 9. | "La guerra di Piero" (1964) | | 3:25 |
| 10. | "Il testamento" (1963) | | 4:06 |

== La canzone di Marinella ==
The album was re-released in 1968, on Roman Record Company label (Catalog: RCP 703), with a different artwork, under the title La canzone di Marinella. The title choice was due to the success met by the song when it was brought to the general public by singer Mina, who had recorded a cover of it in the previous year.

== Personnel ==
- Fabrizio De André – acoustic guitar, vocals
- Vittorio Centanaro – lead guitar
- Pinuccio Pierazzoli – bass
- Franco De Gemini - harmonica
