= Karim (record label) =

Italian record label 1961–1966

Karim was an Italian record label active from 1960 to 1966, when it closed.

== History ==
The Karim label was started in 1960 by Giovanni Fischietti and Gaetano Purvilenti. From the start it was a S.p.A., making 45s and LPs. Some of the more famous singers on the label were Fabrizio De André, Orietta Berti, Jula de Palma and Memo Remigi.

== Catalogue ==
=== LP ===
- Fabrizio De André: Tutto Fabrizio De André (1966) (KLP 13)

=== 45 rpm ===
- Fabrizio: Nuvole barocche/E fu la notte (1961) (KN 101)
- Fabrizio: Ballata del michè/Ballata dell'eroe (1961) (KN 103)
- Fabrizio: Il fannullone/Carlo Martello ritorna dalla battaglia di Poitiers (1963) (KN 177)
- Fabrizio: Il testamento/La ballata del Michè (1963) (KN 184)
- Fabrizio: La guerra di Piero/La ballata dell'eroe (1964) (KN 194)
- Fabrizio: Valzer per un amore/La canzone di Marinella (1964) (KN 204)
- Fabrizio: Per i tuoi larghi occhi/Fila la lana (1965) (KN 206)
- Fabrizio: La città vecchia/Delitto di paese (1965) (KN 209)
- Fabrizio: Canzone dell'amore perduto/Ballata dell'amore cieco o della vanità (1966) (KN 214)
- Fabrizio: Geordie/Amore che vieni amore che vai (1966) (KN 215)
