= Bernardo Lanzetti =

Italian singer (born 1948)

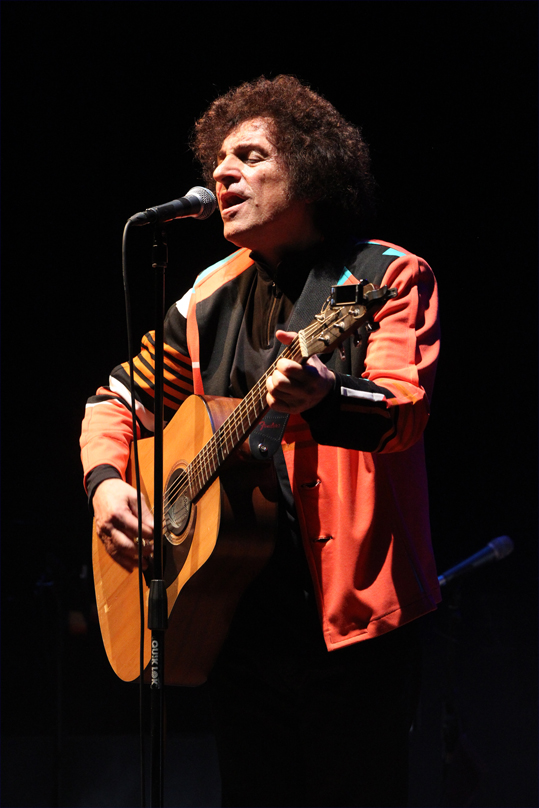
- Lanzetti in 2017

Background information
- Born: November 21, 1948 (age 77); Casalmaggiore, Cremona, Italy
- Occupations: Singer; songwriter
- Years active: 1971–present

Bernardo Lanzetti (born 21 November 1948) is an Italian singer, founder of Acqua Fragile and frontman of Premiata Forneria Marconi for some years.

== Biography ==
Bernardo Lanzetti was born in Casalmaggiore, in the Cremona province. After he finished his studies in the United States, in 1971 he returned to Italy to found the progressive rock band Acqua Fragile and was soon considered one of the best voices of the 70s. From 1975 till 1979 he was the frontman of Premiata Forneria Marconi and appeared on three albums: Chocolate Kings (1976), Jet Lag (1977) and Passpartù (1978). After this period he continued as a solo artist and as leader of Acqua Fragile, recording many albums.

In 2024, Lanzetti talked about his future projects in the It's Psychedelic Baby! Magazine.

== Discography ==
=== Studio albums ===
- 1979 - K.O.
- 1980 - Bernardo Lanzetti
- 1981 - Gente nervosa
- 1982 - Bernardo Lanzetti
- 1998 - I Sing the Voice Impossible
- 1999 - Master Poets
- 2021 - Horizontal Rain
- 2026 - Inseguendo il maestro

=== Collected works ===
- 1999 - The Best

=== Lives ===
- 1997 - Cover Live (FA.MA.)

=== Single albums ===
- 1979 - La tua storia/K.O.
- 1980 - Something new on the way/Blind love
- 1980 - Generazione nucleare/Skaranga!
- 1981 - Gente nervosa/Princess Caroline
- 1982 - Solamente noi/Cherchez la femme

== Sources ==
- Cesare Rizzi, ed. (1993). Enciclopedia del rock italiano. Milan: Arcana. pp. 285–286. ISBN 8879660225.
- Gianluca Testani, ed. (2006). Enciclopedia del rock italiano. Milan: Arcana. ISBN 8879664220.
