= Mauro Pagani =

Italian musician and singer

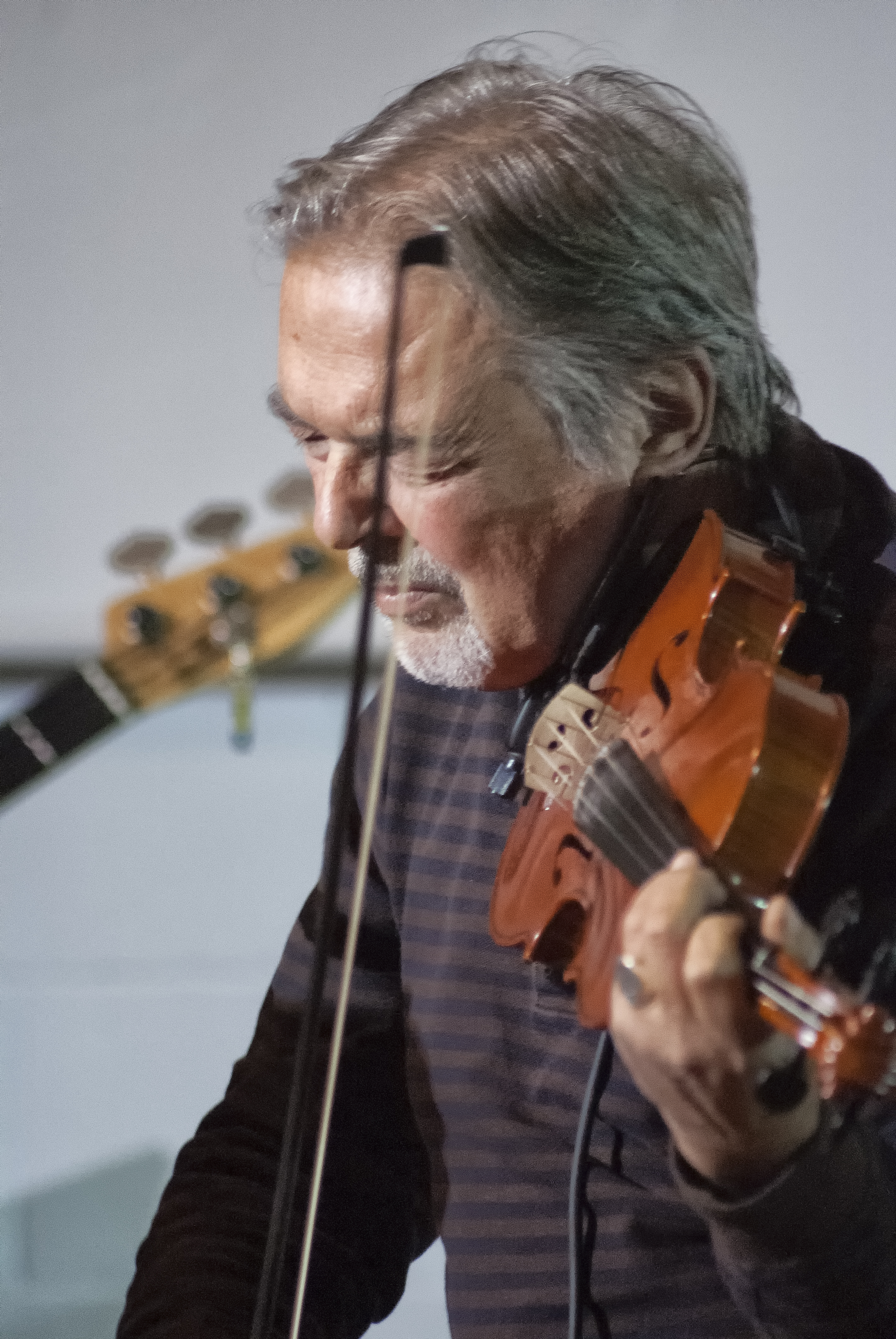
Mauro Pagani

Mauro Pagani (born 5 February 1946) is an Italian musician and singer.

== Biography ==
Pagani was born in Chiari, Lombardy. A multi-instrumentalist, he made his debut in the music world in 1970 as violinist and founding member of the progressive rock band Premiata Forneria Marconi. In 1977 he left the band to follow a solo career. However in 2003 he rejoined for a celebratory concert.

His first solo album, titled "Mauro Pagani" (released in Tokyo in 1979 on Seven Seas and distributed by King Record Co.) included contributions by fellow PFM members Franz Di Cioccio, Patrick Djivas, and Walter Calloni; also showcasing an impressive line-up of guest musicians, including Area's Demetrio Stratos, Peter Gabriel, Giulio Capiozzo, Patrizio Fariselli, Ellade Bandini and Ares Tavolazzi ("L'Albero Di Canto" and "L'Albero Di Canto II" with Area backing Mauro exclusively). Roberto Colombo also played polimoog on "La Città Aromatica".

His solo activity is characterized with a strong experimenting activities of sound related to blues and Mediterranean music. A major result of the second one in particular is the collaboration with the prominent singer songwriter Fabrizio De André in the album Crêuza de mä (1984). With De André Pagani collaborated also in the album Le nuvole (1990).

In 1988 he participated as songwriter, singer and musician together with the supergroup Figli di Bubba to Sanremo Music Festival with his song Nella valle dei Timbales. The supergroup included also Franz Di Cioccio and Sergio Vastano.

In 1991 it was published his second solo album, Passa la bellezza, awarded of Targa Tenco. The album featured also a duet with Fabrizio De André, Davvero davvero. Pagani also collaborated with other famous Italian artists, including Roberto Vecchioni, Gianna Nannini, Luciano Ligabue, Ornella Vanoni.

Pagani composed the soundtrack for four movies by the Italian director Gabriele Salvatores, Sogno di una notte d'estate (1983), Puerto Escondido (1992), Nirvana (1995) and Siberian Education (2013). Other soundtracks composed by Pagani are Attila Fragello di Dio and Topo Galileo together with De André.

In 2009 Pagani was one of the promoters of the charity album Domani 21/04.09.

== Selected discography ==
With Premiata Forneria Marconi (PFM)

- Storia di un minuto (1972, PFM)
- Per un amico (1972, PFM)
- Photos of Ghosts (1973, PFM)
- L'isola di niente (1974, PFM)
- Chocolate Kings (1975, PFM)

Solo and Collaboration

- Mauro Pagani (1978)
- Sogno di una notte d'estate (1981)
- Passa la bellezza (1991)
- Puerto Escondido (1992, soundtrack)
- Nirvana (1995, soundtrack)
- Psycho P. (2001)
- 2004 Crêuza de mä (2004, re-arranged version of the 1984 original)
- Siberian Education (2013, soundtrack)
- The Tasters (2025, soundtrack)

=== Live ===
- In Concerto - Arrangiamenti PFM (Fabrizio De André whith PFM)
