= Claudio Fabi =

Italian composer

- Born: 29 July 1940 (age 84); Rome, Italy
- Occupation: Producer

Claudio Fabi (born 29 July 1940) is an Italian record producer, composer, conductor, pianist and arranger.

== Life and career ==
Born in Rome, Fabi studied at the Pesaro Conservatory and later at the Santa Cecilia Conservatory, where he graduated in piano. In 1966 he became responsible for the classical music sector of RCA Italiana. In 1969 he became director of the Italian branch of Phonogram Records, and in 1971 he became artistic director of Numero Uno, a label founded by Mogol and Lucio Battisti.

Fabi contributed to launch the careers of Premiata Forneria Marconi (of whom he produced the first six albums), Alberto Fortis (of whom he produced the first three albums), Gianna Nannini, Adriano Pappalardo. In 1979 he became artistic director of the Italian branch of PolyGram Records, where he launched the careers of Fabio Concato and Teresa De Sio.

In 1982 he founded an indie label, Aleph, with whom he released his first album with the same name. In the 1990s he moved to Spain, and in 1999 he released the cantata-oratorio Anima Mundi.

He is the father of the singer-songwriter Niccolò Fabi.

== Discography ==
Album

- Aleph (1982)
- Anima Mundi (1999)
- Hermetico (2012)
