= Manticore Records =

UK record label

- Founded: 1973
- Founder: Emerson, Lake & Palmer
- Status: Active
- Distributors: Atlantic Records (1973–1975); Motown Records (1975–1977)
- Genre: Various
- Country of origin: UK
- Location: London
- Official website: manticorerecords.com

Manticore Records is a record label launched by the Manticore production company in 1973. These companies were owned by the members of the progressive rock group Emerson, Lake & Palmer (commonly known as ELP) and their manager, Stewart Young. The manticore was first featured in the artwork for the second ELP album Tarkus, as one of the eponymous creature's adversaries (the only one able to inflict damage on the Tarkus creature, according to the sleeve illustrations). Manticore was initially the name given to ELP's music publishers, credits first appearing in the credits on Trilogy, released on Island in 1972.

== History ==
Initially, the label was manufactured and distributed by Island Records, distributed by Island/EMI, but ELP were unhappy with Island's overseas licensing of their previous records via Cotillion, and looked to RCA for interim distribution before choosing WEA for a manufacturing and distribution deal. The label was then distributed by Atlantic Records (part of WEA) in the UK. (In the US, Atlantic Records distributed the label from 1973 until 1975. Motown Records took over US distribution until the label shut down in 1977.) Although inactive in the UK for new releases (ELP had signed to Atlantic in 1977), the label remained active for back catalogue sales. Although Manticore was inactive for many years most of its recordings have been re-issued by other labels.

The label was relaunched in 2017 under authorization from the Greg Lake estate, stating one of his last wishes was to bring the label back. Live in Piacenza is the first release on the new incarnation of Manticore, released on 7 December 2017. The second was the last album Greg Lake produced before his death, Moonchild by Annie Barbazza and Max Repetti. The third one was John Greaves', Life Size.

One artist considered by the label, but subsequently not signed, was Steve Swindells, whose first LP, Messages, was released instead by RCA. Swindells later joined Pilot, and the Hawklords.

== Artists ==
- Banco del Mutuo Soccorso, Italian prog-rock band, also known as Banco
- Keith Christmas
- Keith Emerson, solo
- Emerson, Lake & Palmer, British prog-rock supergroup, also known as ELP
- John Greaves, British bass guitarist, a member of Henry Cow
- Hanson, British rock band (not the US pop trio)
- Greg Lake, solo
- Little Richard
- Premiata Forneria Marconi, also known as PFM
- Pete Sinfield
- Stray Dog

== See also ==
- Lists of record labels
