= Flavio Premoli =

Italian musician and composer (born 1949)

Flavio Premoli (born 1949 in Varese) is an Italian musician and composer, one of the four founding members of the Italian progressive rock band Premiata Forneria Marconi (PFM). Premoli is currently endorsed by Yamaha synthesizers and pianos, and he is an accomplished accordion performer from the age of 9. Recently, he has been writing music for many Italian TV series and commercials.
