= Franco Mussida =

Italian composer and singer

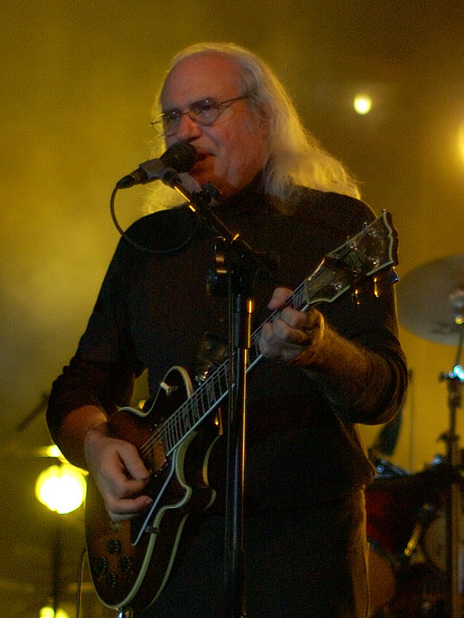
- Mussida on stage with PFM, Modena 2007

Background information
- Born: 21 March 1947; Milan, Italy
- Years active: 1961–present

Franco Mussida (born 21 March 1947) is an Italian guitarist, composer, and singer.

== Biography ==
He is best known as a founder and prominent member of the Italian progressive rock band Premiata Forneria Marconi (PFM), established in the early 1970s and still active. An acclaimed guitar player, in 1984 he founded the Centro Professione Musica, a popular and jazz music academy, which is widely recognized as one of the most important examples in its genre both in Italy and abroad. Besides working with PFM, Mussida has collaborated with a number of other musical acts and released four solo albums.

== Solo discography ==
- Racconti della tenda rossa (1991)
- Accordo (1995)
- Sinfonia Popolare per 1000 Chitarre (1997)
- Il Pianeta Della Musica E Il Viaggio Di Iòtu (2022)

== Books ==
- Franco Mussida, La musica è fortuna, Roma, Sandro Teti Editore, ISBN 9788899918026
- Franco Mussida, La musica ignorata. Musicisti e ascoltatori, Editore Skira, 2013, ISBN 88-572-2067-2
- Franco Mussida, Il pianeta della musica. Come la musica dialoga con le nostre emozioni, 2019, ISBN 88-938-1773-X
