= Bluebell Records =

- Parent company: Belldisc S.p.A.
- Founded: 1950
- Founder: Antonio Casetta
- Defunct: 1969
- Status: Defunct
- Genre: Pop music
- Country of origin: Italy
- Location: Milan

Bluebell Records was an Italian independent record label active from 1959 to 1969 as part, along with other labels such as Mini Rec and Belldisc, of the Belldisc S.p.A. group. In 1969 these labels were fused into a new one, which became known as Produttori Associati.

The label released records by several artists, such as Fabrizio De André, Carmen Villani, The New Dada, Rocco Granata, Maurizio Arcieri and Duilio Del Prete. For many years, the label's head of publicity was Germano Ruscitto, who went on to become director of the music magazine Discografia Internazionale.

== Catalog ==
There is a chronological incongruence in the numbering of the 33 rpm catalog: after Fabrizio De André's Vol. 1° (BBLP 39) the numbering starts back from BBLP 30 (De André's following album, Tutti morimmo a stento, is numbered BBLP 32).

As for the 45 rpm catalog, two singles by The New Dada were published with the same catalog number (BB 03151) due to the label's decision to "promote" the single's B-side to the A-side of a new single, with a new B-side and different artwork, but the same catalog number.

=== 33 rpm ===
Catalog number	Year	Artist	Title
BBLP 35	1965	Bruno De Filippi e il suo complesso	Live al Santa Tecla di Milano (1963)
BBLP 37	1966	The New Dada	I'll go crazy
BBLP 38	1966	Carmen Villani	Carmen
BBLP 39	1967	Fabrizio De André	Vol. 1°
BBLP 30	1968	I Barritas	La messa dei giovani
BBLP 31	1968	Michele Lacerenza	Never my love
BBLP 32	1968	Fabrizio De André	Tutti morimmo a stento
BBLP 33	1968	Fabrizio De André	Vol. 3°

=== 45 rpm ===
Catalog number	Year	Artist	Title
BB 03004	1959	Jackie Williams (A-side)/Vernons (B-side)	"Just a Dream"/"Problems"
BB 03008	1959	Niki Davis	"Promise Me"/"Rido"
BB 03011	1959	Los Cangaceiros (A-side)/Los Muchachos (B-side)	"Venus cha cha cha"/"La bamba"
BB 03012	1959	Niki Davis	"Quando l'estate se ne va"/"Forever"
BB 03013	1959	Lise Reinau	"Kiss Me Honey Honey Kiss Me"/"(I Don't Care) Only Love Me"
BB 03014	1959	Rocco Granata	"Marina"/"Manuela"
BB 03019	1959	Enrico Intra	"Gioco"/"Sempre ammore"
BB 03020	1959	Carmen Villani	"Sul banco di scuola (ho inciso il tuo nome)"/I Love You amore"
BB 03021	1959	Carmen Villani	"Espada"/"Jimmy"
BB 03022	1960	Complesso Zoffoli	"Un mare di baci"/"Preghiera d'amore"
BB 03024	1960	Niki Davis	"Nuvole"/"La strada dell'amore"
BB 03026	1960	Paolo e i Nordisti	"Prima di dormir bambina"/"Un po' di luna"
BB 03027	1960	Complesso Zoffoli	"Mustapha"/"T'amerò per sempre"
BB 03028	1960	Pippo Starnazza	"Tu sei prismatica"/"Besame mucho"
BB 03031	1960	Tony Dallara	"Madonnina"/"Se bacio la tua bocca"
BB 03035	1960	Bengt Arne	"Tango jalusie cha cha cha"/"Star Dust Cha Cha"
BB 03039	1960	Niki Davis	"Acquarello in blue"/"Uno a te, uno a me"
BB 03044	1960	Piero Litaliano	"Confiteor"/"La grotta dell'amore"
BB 03045	1961	Rocco Granata	"Germanina"/"Ein italiano"
BB 03046	1961	Rocco Granata	"Carolina dai!"/"Biondina"
BB 03047	1961	Niki Davis	"Pozzanghere"/"Pigro mattin"
BB 03053	1961	Gianfranco Intra	"I nomadi"/"Dolci sogni"
BB 03054	1961	Carmen Villani	"Tramonto in Canada"/"La nostra strada"
BB 03055	1961	Federico Monti Arduini	"Dolci sogni"/"Così"
BB 03056	1961	Piero Litaliano	"L'ultima volta che la vidi"/"Quando il vento si leva"
BB 03059	1961	Federico Monti Arduini	"Nuvola d'occasione"/"Ricordo d'amore"
BB 03068	1962	Federico Monti Arduini	"Mai, mai, mai"/"Ombre"
BB 03069	1962	Rocco Granata	"Signorina bella"/"Gisella"
BB 03072	1962	Rocco Granata	"Irena"/"Lacrime d'amore"
BB 03074	1962	Federico Monti Arduini	"È Natale"/"Jingle Bells"
BB 03082	1962	Carmen Villani	"Un domani per noi"/"T'ho voluto tanto bene"
BB 03083	1962	Joe Damiano	"Creola"/"Rondine al nido"
BB 03084	1962	Bruno De Filippi e il suo complesso	"Munasterio 'e santa Chiara"/"Aggio perduto 'o sonno"
BB 03089	1962	Bruno De Filippi e il suo complesso	"Perry Mason"/"Guitar Twist"
BB 03090	1962	Bruno De Filippi e il suo complesso	"Nuages"/"Cuore napoletano"
BB 03091	1962	Carmen Villani	"Brucia"/"Potrai fidarti di me"
BB 03093	1962	Niki Davis	"Tombola"/"Girotondo twist"
BB 03094	1962	Bruno De Filippi e il suo complesso	"Twist del barbiere"/"Arpa twist"
BB 03096	1962	Joao Gilberto	"Desafinado"/"Rosa morena"
BB 03098	1963	Bruno De Filippi e il suo complesso	"Tu verrai"/"Il nostro amor"
BB 03101	1963	Joe Damiano	"Sei fuggito da una favola"/"Le voci"
BB 03102	1963	Federico Monti Arduini	"L'organino"/"Sai..."
BB 03104	1963	Carmen Villani	"Lo so"/"Non verrà da te la felicità"
BB 03108	1963	Carmen Villani	"Io sono così"/"Questa sera"
BB 03110	1963	Gian Carlo	"Lui e lei"/"Innamorato di te"
BB 03111	1963	Jimmy Roselli	"Malafemmena"/"Her Eyes Shone Like Diamonds"
BB 03112	1963	Bruno & His Brunos	"Stukas"/"Guitar twist"
BB 03113	1963	Bruno De Filippi e il suo complesso	"Mercoledì"/"Dammi il numero di telefono"
BB 03116	1963	Joe Damiano	"Nilo blu"/"Un solo amore"
BB 03117	1963	Pino Catini	"Un fratello per te"/"La tua stanza"
BB 03118	1963	Mario Fazi	"Niente di più"/"Forse mai più"
BB 03119	1964	Romolo	"Tu, solamente tu"/"No, non verrò"
BB 03120	1964	Gianni Maser	"Al mare c'è il sole"/"Parlano di me"
BB 03122	1964	Claudio Lippi	"Addio amore"/"Cosa importa"
BB 03122	1964	Claudio Lippi	"Cosa importa"/"Tu non sai"
BB 03123	1964	Carmen Villani	"Imparerò a nuotare"/"Che cosa vuoi farci"
BB 03124	1964	Pino Catini (A-side)/Roman New Orleans Jazz Band (B-side)	"Ciao Dolly"/"Anche gli angeli ballano il surf"
BB 03125	1964	Carmen Villani	"Congratulazioni a te"/"L'amore che mi hai dato"
BB 03130	1965	The New Dada	"Ciò che fai"/"Domani sì"
BB 03131	1965	Carmen Villani	"La verità"/"Baby Love"
BB 03132	1965	Claudio Lippi	"Come mai, come mai"/"Se vedrai"
BB 03134	1965	Carmen Villani	"Amerai solo me"/"Come fai"
BB 03136	1965	Claudio Lippi	"Per ognuno c'è qualcuno"/"Viva viva!"
BB 03138	1965	Avengers	"Avengers"/"Avengers (Instrumental version)"
BB 03139	1965	The New Dada	"La tua voce"/"Domani si"
BB 03141	1965	Bruno De Filippi e il suo complesso	"Io t'ho incontrata a Napoli"/"Accarezzame"
BB 03142	1965	Carmen Villani	"Io ca te voglio bene"/"Nun era ammore"
BB 03144	1965	The New Dada	"L'amore vero"/"C'è qualcosa"
BB 03147	1965	Emilio Campassi & i Canaris	"Non posso più amare nessuno"/"Vai pure via"
BB 03148	1966	Michel Sidney	"Aline"/"Non dire mai"
BB 03149	1966	Carmen Villani	"Anche se mi vuoi"/"Passa il tempo"
BB 03150	1966	Claudio Lippi	"La ragazza che mi va"/"Se tu vuoi"
BB 03151	1966	The New Dada	"Non dirne più"/"Batti i pugni"
BB 03151	1966	The New Dada	"Batti i pugni"/"Sick and Tired"
BB 03154	1966	The New Dada	"T Bird"/I'll Go Crazy"
BB 03155	1966	Carmen Villani	"Bada Caterina"/"Brillo e bollo"
BB 03156	1966	Joe Damiano	"La nave dei miei sogni"/"Teneramente"
BB 03158	1966	Los Norte Americanos	"Spanish Flea"/"What Now My Love"
BB 03159	1966	Claudio Lippi	"Gira le spalle al mondo"/"La lettera"
BB 03160	1966	Los Pekenikes	"Filo di seta"/"Sombras y reias"
BB 03161	1967	Carmen Villani	"Mille chitarre contro la guerra"/"Ti prego resta accanto a me"
BB 03162	1967	Claudio Lippi	"Maria Maria"/"Il nostro giorno"
BB 03163	1967	The New Dada	"Lady Jane"/"Quindicesima frustata"
BB 03165	1967	Messaggeri	"Torna da me"/"Più dolcemente tu vivrai"
BB 03172	1967	Maurizio Arcieri	"Ballerina"/"Non c'è bisogno di camminare"
BB 03174	1967	Mister Anima	"Non voglio pietà"/"Solitude Time"
BB 03176	1967	I Barritas	"Dusu amigusu"/"Su stracu"
BB 03177	1967	Fabrizio De André	"Preghiera in gennaio"/"Si chiamava Gesù"
BB 03178	1967	Claudio Lippi	"Sì Maria"/"Suonano le chitarre"
BB 03179	1967	Maurizio Arcieri	"Lady Jane"/"T'amo da morire"
BB 03182	1967	Probus Harlem	"A Whiter Shade of Pale"/"Hold On, I'm Coming"
BB 03184	1967	Michele Lacerenza	"Over and Over"/"Io potrei"
BB 03185	1967	Mister Anima	"La mia passeggiata"/"L'attrazione"
BB 03186	1967	Claudio Lippi	"Una testa dura"/"Gira le spalle al mondo"
BB 03187	1967	Fabrizio De André	"Bocca di rosa"/"Via del Campo"
BB 03188	1967	Carmen Villani	"Non c'è bisogno di camminare"/"Se se se"
BB 03189	1967	Fabrizio De André	"Spiritual"/"Caro amore"
BB 03190	1967	I Corvi	"Bambolina"/"Nemmeno una lacrima"
BB 03191	1967	Probus Harlem	"Homburg"/"Love, Drugs and Sex"
BB 03193	1967	Fabrizio De André	"La canzone di Barbaral"/"Carlo Martello ritorna dalla battaglia di Poitiers"
BB 03194	1967	I Barrittas	"Filo di seta"/"Se io ti regalo un fiore"
BB 03195	1967	Cochi e Renato	"Gli indiani"/"La gallina"
BB 03196	1968	I Corvi	"Datemi un biglietto d'aereo"/"Questo è giusto"
BB 03197	1968	Paolo Rugolo	"Guarda dove vai"/"Non è tardi"
BB 03198	1968	Michele Lacerenza	"Never My Love"/"Filo di seta"
BB 03199	1968	Cochi e Renato	"A me mi piace il mare"/"Bravo 7+"
BB 03201	1968	I Barrittas	"Sanctus"/"Agnus Dei"
BB 03202	1968	Fabrizio De André	"La canzone di Marinella"/"Amore che vieni, amore che vai"
BB 03203	1968	I Barritas	"Non uccidere"/"Introito"
BB 03204	1968	Fabrizio De André	"La ballata del Michè"/"La guerra di Piero"
BB 03205	1968	I Barritas	"Ho bisogno di te"/"Proprio stasera"
BB 03206	1969	Fabrizio De André	"Il gorilla"/"Nell'acqua della chiara fontana"
BB 03208	1969	Fabrizio De André	"Leggenda di Natale"/"Inverno"

=== 45 rpm - Mini Rec label ===
Catalog number	Year	Artist	Title
BB 2001	1967	Stormy Six	Oggi piango/Il mondo è pieno di gente
BB 2002	1967	Fiammetta	Quando la campana suonerà/Little man
BB 2003	1967	Claus	Soldato universale/Colori
BB 2004	1967	Fiammetta	Ricordare o dimenticare/Grida alla vita
BB 2006	1967	Stormy Six	Lui verrà/L'amico e il fico
BB 2007	1967	I Gemini 4	Io pagherò/Sì è lei
BB 2008	1967	Claus	San Francisco/Colori
BB 2009	1968	Fiammetta	Prega per me/Una chitarra dimenticata
BB 2010	1968	Ketty	Scusa caro/Se amo un ragazzo

=== 33 rpm - OFF series ===
Catalog number	Year	Artist	Title
BNO/LP 27	1968	Duilio Del Prete	Dove correte!
VO/LP 201	1969	Beppe Chierici	Chierici canta Brassens

=== 45 rpm - OFF series ===
Catalog number	Year	Artist	Title
BNO/NP 16101	1969	Duilio Del Prete	L'isola/Pan
BNO/NP 16102	1970	Duilio Del Prete	La bassa landa/Il galeone
