= I Tubi Lungimiranti =

Italian music group (1964–1970)

- Genres: Beat, psychedelic rock, garage rock
- Years active: 1964–1970
- Label: CDI

I Tubi Lungimiranti was a musical group formed in Fano, Italy in 1964. The group was part of the 1960s Italian Beat music movement. They later became a cult group for Dirty Acoustics and Garage Beat.

== History ==
=== 1964–1965: Origins ===
The group was started by Umberto Bultrighini in Fano, Italy in 1964. His sister chose the group's name, which otherwise would have been Ossi Buchi. The following year the group became a quartet when Bultrighini was joined by two brothers, Paolo and Francesco Del Bianco, and drummer Gualfardo Aiudi. They began by playing in local spots in the Marche region of Italy.

=== 1966–1968: CDI and Abbiamo Paura Dei Topi ===
In 1966, the group signed a contract with CDI (Company Discografica Italiana), the label of Pier Quinto Cariaggi, Lara Saint Paul's husband. In January 1967, they recorded and published three songs on a single 7" titled Abbiamo Paura Dei Topi (CDI, 1968). This vinyl record has a unique history: the record company printed the test-pieces rather than the final versions of the songs by mistake. This made the sound much dirtier than the standard of the time, to the point that it resembled the psychedelic rock which was popular overseas. Even though the leading song, Abbiamo Paura Dei Topi, didn't sell well, it became a cultural reference for Underground Garage beat bands and neo-psychedelics.

That same year, the band participated in the second Italia-Beat Gran Premio Davoli Tournament and expanded with the addition of organist Pierluigi Mattiello.

=== 1969–1970: A Poche Ore followed by the band's decline ===
The band replaced drummer Aiudi with Giuliano Antonioni and then recorded their second 45 RPM in Milan, September 1969. In January 1970, the record was published with Spegni Questa Luce, a cover by Rokes, on one side, and A Poche Ore, a cover from 24 Hours from Tulsa by Gene Pitney, on the other side. The cover photo revealed the group's attention to their look, as each member exhibited a particular style: one wore glasses emphasizing an intellectual look, one wore a funky hat, and so on.

The band recorded 12 more songs but were unable to publish them, beat music was no longer what record companies were interested in. They now preferred to work with established artists or bands of newer, more complex rock styles. After the second record was published, Antonioni abandoned the band. His substitute, Adriano Pedini, played in concert with them for only a few months before Tubi Lungimiranti decided to disband. Their two records were then sought out by vintage vinyl collectors.

=== 1994: New "old" CDs and the band's reunion ===
In 1993, Red Ronnie included their song, Abbiamo Paura dei Topi, in the CD Quei Favolosi Anni '60 ● 1968 – 12 (Fabbri Editori). The same year, Destination X published the collection Spegni Questa luce, which included the 7" songs and the 12 unpublished songs. In 1994, the group reunited with a slightly different line-up and held a concert at Il Covo in Bologna. For the occasion, Destination X released Live 1967–1970, an album containing old and unpublished records taken from a 1969 live concert on the national TV RAI. Afterwards Destination X included them into the compilation 60's Italian Beat Resurrection! Volume 5 (1994). In 1995, Reverendo Moon Records included them in Per Chi NonConosce la Liberta' (Raro Beat Italiano Vol. 1) a compilation curated by Reverendo Moon.

The last drummer, Adriano Pedini, became a session man, playing the drums for many of the CDs published by Cramps. In 1976, he played in the celebrated album the Ho Visto Anche Degli Zingari Felici by Claudio Lolli. In 1995, he took on jazz and became artistic director and coordinator for the Fano Jazz by The Sea music festival.

Paolo Del Bianco devoted himself to photography and to this day takes part in the music business by playing in Micio Sband.

Umberto Bultrighini devoted himself to teaching. He kept up his interest in music, which eventually led him to publish the volume Dopo I Beatles: music and society in the seventies in 2003. He co-authored the book with Gianni Oliva, a colleague from the university, and published it on Editrice Carrabba. Since 2010, Bultrighini has been touring around Italy, with Gene Guglielmi and Claudio Scarpa, and holding a debate titled “Al di Qua, Al di Là del Beat.” At these events, they discuss the true nature of the Italian beat as well as play music and sing songs. In July 2011, the three authors wrote about their experiences in the book “Al di Qua, Al di Là del Beat," which is published by Edizioni Carabba. The book included a CD with Gene Guglielmi and Tubi Lungimiranti songs.

In 2012, a new collection of old songs came out titled Qui e Adesso (Halidon), on which Gene Guglielmi and the girl-band Le Rimmel were guest artists.

== Lineup ==
- Paolo Del Bianco: voice and guitar
- Francesco Del Bianco: bass
- Gualfardo Aiuti: drummer (1965–1969)
- Umberto Bultrighini: voice and guitar soloist
- Giuliano Antonioni: drummer (1969–1970)
- Pierluigi Mattiello: organist (1968–1970)
- Adriano Pedini: drummer (1970)

== Discography ==
=== 45 RPM ===
- 1968 – Abbiamo Paura dei Topi/Hai Distrutto una Famiglia/L'Anima (CDI, 2028)
- 1970 – Spegni Questa Luce/A Poche Ore (CDI, 2038)

=== 33 RPM ===
- 1994 – Live 1967–1970 (Destination X)

=== Compilation albums ===
- 1993 – Quei Favolosi Anni '60 ● 1968 – 12 – with the song Abbiamo Paura Dei Topi (CD, Fabbri Editori curata by Red Ronnie)
- 1994 – Various – 60's Italian Beat Resurrection! Volume 5 – with the songs Il Vento Dell'Est (LP, Destination X Records)
- 1995 – Per Chi Non Conosce La Liberta – with the song Abbiamo Paura Dei Topi (Raro Beat Italiano Vol. 1) (LP, Reverendo Moon Records)

== Related entries ==
- Noi Tre

== Bibliography ==
- Ursus (Salvo D'Urso) – Manifesto beat – Juke Box all'Idrogeno, Torino, 1990, pag. 139
- Raro! numero 152, febbraio 2004
- Claudio Pescetelli – Una generazione piena di complessi – Editrice Zona, Arezzo, 2006, pag. 156–157
- Tiziano Tarli – Beat Italiano. Dai capelloni a Bandiera Gialla – Edizioni Castelvecchi, 2005
- Alessio Marino, "BEATi voi! n.2 – Interviste e riflessioni con i complessi degli anni 60 e 70", edizioni I LIBRI DELLA BEAT BOUTIQUE 67, (vol.2) 2008; (foto e informazioni sui Tubi Lungimiranti e altri gruppi beat della provincia di Pesaro)
- Alessio Marino, "BEATi voi! n.6 – Interviste e riflessioni con i complessi degli anni 60 e 70", edizioni I LIBRI DELLA BEAT BOUTIQUE 67, (vol.9) 2011; (foto e informazioni sui Tubi Lungimiranti contenuto in un articolo sui complessi psichedelici e acid-beat)
- Rizzi, Cesare; Beretta, Fulvio (1993). Rizzi, Cesare (ed.). Enciclopedia del rock italiano (in Italian). Milano: Arcana. ISBN 88-7966-022-5.
