= New Dada =

Italian beat band

- Origin: Italy
- Genres: Beat music
- Years active: 1962–1966
- Labels: Bluebell Records
- Members: Maurizio Arcieri, Franco Longo, Franco Jadanza, Renato Vignocchi, Ferruccio Sansoni, Giorgio Fazzini

New Dada was an Italian beat band active between 1962 and 1966.

== Career ==
The New Dada were formed in Milan in 1962 by vocalist Maurizio Arcieri (30 April 1942 – 29 January 2015), Franco "Pupo" Longo (drums), Franco Jadanza and Renato "Renè" Vignocchi (guitar), Ferruccio "Ferry" Sansoni (keyboards) and Giorgio Fazzini (bass guitar). Their first single, "Ciò Che Fai" was released in 1965 by the German label Bluebell.

In 1965, their manager, Leo Wätcher, convinced The Beatles's management to choose The New Dada as supporting act for their Italian tour. They same year the band won the first edition of the "Beat Bands Festival" in Rieti. After releasing a handful of singles and their first and only album, I'll Go Crazy, the band got significant airplay and was invited to television programmes, Studio Uno and Andiamoci Piano. In 1966 The New Dada participated to the 5th edition of the Cantagiro Festival with the song "Non dirne più". In November 1966 they won the "Yellow Record" award at the Bandiera Gialla Beat Club in Rimini with a cover of The Rolling Stones's "Lady Jane".

In 1967, creative tensions within the band resulted in a split, with Arcieri, Fazzini and Longo on one side and Sansoni, Vignocchi and Jadanza on the other. Sansoni, Vignocchi and Jadanza formed the band Ferry, Franco, René, Danny e Gaby with Gaby Lizmi (guitar) and Danny B. Besquet (bass). They signed with CBS and released two singles. In April 1967 they opened for The Rolling Stones in Rome before disbanding. Arcieri, Longo and Fazzini joined forces with Giandomenico Crescentini (bass), Roberto Rossetto (keyboards) and Gilberto Ziglioli (guitar), but the band soon became a vehicle for Arcieri's solo career. In 1967 Arcieri formed a new band, Krisma, with Christina Moser, whom he had met on 22 September 1966 at a private party held for the birthday of Wätcher's daughter Patrizia.

== Band members ==
- Maurizio Arcieri – vocals
- Franco "Pupo" Longo – drums
- Franco Jadanza – guitar
- Renato "Renè" Vignocchi – guitar
- Ferruccio "Ferry" Sansoni – keyboards
- Giorgio Fazzini – bass

== Discography ==
=== Albums ===
- (1966) I'll Go Crazy (Bluebell)

=== Singles ===
- (1965) "Ciò Che Fai" / "Domani Si" (Bluebell)
- (1965) "La Tua Voce" / "Domani Si" (Bluebell)
- (1965) "L'Amore Vero" / "C'è' Qualcosa" (Bluebell)
- (1965) "Batti I Pugni" / "Sick and Tired" (Bluebell)
- (1966) "Non Dirne Più" / "Batti I Pugni" (Bluebell)
- (1966) "T-Bird" / "I'll Go Crazy" (Bluebell)
- (1966) "Lady Jane" / "15ma Frustata" (Bluebell)
