= Arcieri =

Arcieri is a surname. Notable people with the surname include:

- Leila Arcieri (born 1973), American actress, model, and businesswoman
- Maurizio Arcieri (1942–2015), Italian singer
