= Mr. Kinky =

- Directed by: Dino Risi
- Written by: Ruggero Maccari; Ettore Scola; Dino Risi
- Produced by: Mario Cecchi Gori
- Starring: Vittorio Gassman; Ann-Margret
- Cinematography: Alessandro D'Eva
- Music by: Armando Trovajoli
- Release date: 1968
- Country: Italy
- Language: Italian

Mr. Kinky (Italian: Il profeta, lit. 'The Prophet') is a 1968 Italian comedy film directed by Dino Risi.

== Plot ==
Pietro Breccia is a man who has long decided to abandon civilization, becoming a hermit, leaving behind the strain of modern life and the futility of consumer society, living for years in seclusion on Monte Soratte, near Rome. One day he is discovered by a TV crew that, sniffing the scoop, film a report about him. From that moment, against his will, he gets sucked into civilization.

== Cast ==
- Vittorio Gassman: Pietro Breccia, the hermit
- Ann-Margret: Maggie, a hippy
- Liana Orfei: Albertina, Puccio's sister
- Fiorenzo Fiorentini: Luigi
- Oreste Lionello: Puccio, Breccia's manager
- Enzo Robutti: Alberto
- Yvonne Sanson: Carla Bagni
- Carmen Villani

== Production ==
It was one of several films Ann-Margret made in Europe around this time.
