= Volume 1 (Fabrizio De André album) =

Vol. 1º

Studio album by Fabrizio De André
- Released: 1967
- Recorded: 18–25 July 1964
- Genre: Folk
- Length: 30:29
- Label: Bluebell Records (BBLP 39)
- Producer: Gian Piero Reverberi; A. Malcotti

Fabrizio De André chronology
Vol. 1º (1967)	Tutti morimmo a stento (1968)

Reissue cover
- Front cover of the 1967 reissue

Singles from Vol. 1º
- 1. "Preghiera in Gennaio/Si chiamava Gesù" Released: 1967; 2. "Via del Campo/Bocca di rosa" Released: 1967; 3. "Caro amore/Spiritual" Released: 1967; 4. "La canzone di Barbara/Carlo Martello ritorna dalla battaglia di Poitiers" Released: 1968; 5. "Carlo Martello ritorna dalla battaglia di Poitiers/Il testamento" Released: 1968; 6. "La stagione del tuo amore/Spiritual" Released: 1971

Professional ratings
Review scores
Source	Rating
Allmusic	4/5 stars

Volume 1 (Vol. 1º) is the second studio release by Italian singer-songwriter Fabrizio De André and his first true studio album. It was first issued in 1967 on Bluebell Records. It is a collection of re-recordings of De André's early singles, previously issued on the Karim label.

== Track listing ==
All tracks are written by Fabrizio De André, except where noted (Note: All arrangements and orchestral conducting by Gian Piero Reverberi (uncredited))

Side one
No.	Title	Music	Length
1.	"Preghiera in Gennaio"		3:28
2.	"Marcia nuziale"	Georges Brassens	3:10
3.	"Spiritual"		2:34
4.	"Si chiamava Gesù"	De André, Vittorio Centanaro (Note: Uncredited on the album.)	3:09
5.	"La canzone di Barbara"		2:17

Side two
No.	Title	Lyrics	Music	Length
6.	"Via del Campo"		Enzo Jannacci	2:31
7.	"Caro amore"		Joaquín Rodrigo	3:57
8.	"Bocca di rosa"			3:05
9.	"La morte"		G. Brassens	2:22
10.	"Carlo Martello ritorna dalla battaglia di Poitiers"	De André, Paolo Villaggio		5:21

1971 reissue track listing
No.	Title	Lyrics	Music	Length
1.	"Preghiera in Gennaio"			3:28
2.	"Marcia nuziale"		Georges Brassens	3:10
3.	"Spiritual"			2:34
4.	"Si chiamava Gesù"		De André, Vittorio Centanaro (Note: Uncredited on the album.)	3:09
5.	"La canzone di Barbara"			2:17
6.	"Via del Campo"		Enzo Jannacci	2:31
7.	"La stagione del tuo amore"			2:59
8.	"Bocca di rosa"			3:05
9.	"La morte"		Brassens	2:22
10.	"Carlo Martello ritorna dalla battaglia di Poitiers"	De André, Paolo Villaggio		5:21

== The songs ==
=== "Preghiera in Gennaio" ===
("Prayer in January")
The song is dedicated to the memory of Fabrizio's longtime friend Luigi Tenco, who had committed suicide in January that year, after taking part in the Italian Song Festival of Sanremo and failing to advance to the final competition. The lyrics deal with the theme of suicide and the Church's systematic condemnation of those who kill themselves.

=== "Marcia nuziale" ===
("Wedding March")
A translated version of the song "La Marche nuptiale", written in 1956 by Georges Brassens, who De André always considered a master as well as one of his greatest sources of inspiration.

=== "Spiritual" ===
This song, true to its title, is a spiritual in which De André sings with a deep voice, similar to that of African American singers. The lyrics may be read as a genuine expression of praise to God, as in the best tradition of American gospel, but their general informal tone, as well as the song's placement in the tracklist of the album - coming right before an unconventional depiction of Jesus - both point to a slightly cynical, detached attitude by De André toward organized religion in general. This is particularly clear in the final two lines: "God of Heaven, I will wait for you; in Heaven and on Earth I will look for you." Also, during his last-ever filmed live performance, on 14 February 1998, De André said: "If God didn't exist we should invent Him - which is exactly what mankind has been doing for the past 2000 years."

=== "Si chiamava Gesù" ===
("He Was Called Jesus")
The singer narrates the story of Jesus in an avant guardist way, saying that his goal isn't to glorify someone who he believes was "nothing but a man gone down in history as a god". (Note: Original lyrics: "[...]di chi penso non fu altri che un uomo/come Dio passato alla storia[...]") While maintaining an atheist point of view, De André shows great respect and admiration toward the human figure of Jesus, whom he referred to as "the greatest revolutionary of all history".

=== "La canzone di Barbara" ===
("Barbara's song")
A low-key folk song about an unfaithful girl called Barbara. It was the last song from the album to be released as a single, with a different mixing and some guitar parts cut out.

=== "Via del Campo" ===
In this song, partly inspired by Genoan transvestite "Morena", De André expresses his sympathy to the lower social classes. Via del Campo was an infamous street of Genoa, known in the 1960s as home to prostitutes, transvestites and poor people. This composition features the music of an Enzo Jannacci song, "La mia morosa la và alla fonte", which De André erroneously believed to be a medieval ballad rediscovered by Dario Fo. Jannacci recorded the song himself for his 1988 album Vengo anch'io. No, tu no.

=== "Caro amore" ===
("Dear Love")
When the album was reissued in 1971 under the newly-born Produttori Associati label, this song, whose music is taken from the second movement Adagio of Joaquín Rodrigo's 1939 Concierto de Aranjuez, was taken out of the album under request of Rodrigo himself, who did not approve the use of De André's lyrics with his music (indeed, he did not approve at all of having lyrics sung over his composition). The song was eventually replaced with "La stagione del tuo amore" ("The Season of Your Love"), a De André original, which would be featured in every following reissue.

=== "Bocca di Rosa" ===
("Rose Mouth")
Possibly based on Brassens' song "Brave Margot" (1952), it is one of De André's most well-known songs and, as stated by the singer himself, the one that "resembles him the most".
The song tells the story of a foreign girl (Bocca di Rosa, who is not a prostitute since - as the song states - she never asks for money), whose passionate and libertine behaviour upsets the women of the small town of Sant'Ilario. Seeing her conduct as unacceptable, the women turn to the Police commissioner, who sends four gendarmes to put her on the first train out of town. All the men in town gather at the station to send their regards to the woman who "brought love to the town". At the following station, she is greeted by even more people, including the priest, who wants her to be by his side during the subsequent procession, not far from the statue of the Virgin Mary, thus "carrying around town sacred love and profane love". (Note: Original lyrics: "[...] e con la Vergine in prima fila/e Bocca di rosa poco lontano,/si porta a spasso per il paese/l'amore sacro e l'amor profano")
Bocca di Rosa's character was reproposed, with different connotations, in the novel Un destino ridicolo, co-written by De André and writer Alessandro Gennari.
According to newspaper Il Secolo XIX, the inspirer of the song died June 14, 2010, aged 88, in Sampierdarena hospital, in Genoa. De André's widow, Dori Ghezzi, and his longtime friend Paolo Villaggio both denied De André ever meeting her, despite the singer having stated otherwise to newspaper Repubblica in 1996.

==== Controversy ====
"Bocca di Rosa" was re-recorded with different lyrics for the first reissue of the album. The fictional town of Sant'Ilario, named after an actual suburb of Genoa, was renamed "San Vicario". Also, after "polite pressures from the corps of Carabinieri", a line was taken out of the lyrics which criticized the law enforcement corps (with explicit mention of the Carabinieri). This "censored" version of the song would be featured in every following reissue. The original version was included in the posthumous 2005 compilation album In direzione ostinata e contraria.

=== "La morte" ===
("Death")
The music for this song is taken from "Le verger de Roi Louis", composed by Georges Brassens with lyrics by Théodore de Banville. The main theme is the inevitability of death, which strikes without any warning, regardless of the identity of the victim, unstoppable.

=== "Carlo Martello ritorna dalla battaglia di Poitiers" ===
("Charles Martel Returns from the Battle of Poitiers")
The song is a parody of the Christian medieval tradition based on the historical figure Charles Martel.
Martel, returning victorious after the Battle of Tours, is "feeling love yearnings more than body wounds" (Note: Original lyrics: [...] ma più che del corpo le ferite/da Carlo son sentite le bramosie d'amor [...]) and uses his position as king to obtain sexual favors from a beautiful peasant girl. Then, when the girl demands payment for her "services" afterwards (thus revealing herself as a prostitute), Martel quickly hops on his horse and rides away in a comical fashion.
The song imitates an ancient Occitan lyric genre, the "Pastorela", which revolved around the meeting of knights with shepherdesses in bucolic sets such as brooks and stretches of water.
The idea for the song was born on a day of November 1962, when De André and Paolo Villaggio were at Villaggio's house in Genoa, both waiting for their wives to give birth. De André played the melody on a guitar and Villaggio, very fond of history, immediately thought of writing lyrics to it about Charles Martel. A week later, the lyrics were ready.
Several poetic licenses are used in the lyrics:
- Charles Martel was never a king, only Mayor of the Palace under the Merovingian kings.
- The Battle of Tours took place in the month of October, not in spring. (Note: Original lyrics: "[...]al sol della calda primavera[...]")
The song had been first released as the B-side of a single in 1963 and was re-recorded for the album with some differences, namely the marked Bolognese accent of De André's interpretation of the girl and trumpet solos between each verse.

== Release history ==
Year	Label	Format	Catalog number
1967	Bluebell Records	mono LP	BBLP 39
1967	Bluebell Records	stereo LP	BBLPS 39
1970	Produttori Associati	stereo LP	PA-LPS 39
1970	Tonycassette	stereo cassette	3 TC 1008
1970	Produttori Associati	stereo cassette	PA 1008
1970	Produttori Associati	8-track	PA 9003
1970	Ricordi	stereo LP	SMRL 6236
1983	Ricordi	stereo LP	ORL 8898
1983	Ricordi	stereo cassette	ORK 78898
1987	Ricordi	CD	CDMRL 6236
1991	Ricordi	CD	CDOR 8898
1995	BMG-Ricordi	stereo cassette	RIK 76493
1995	BMG-Ricordi	CD	CDMRL 6493
2002	BMG-Ricordi	CD	74321974572
2009	Sony BMG	CD	88697454692
2009	Sony Music	red-coloured vinyl LP	88697599751
2010	Sony Music	double 45 rpm vinyl record	88697668851
