= Hibernation (album) =

Studio album by Chrisma
- Released: 1979
- Recorded: October–December 1978
- Studio: Phonogram Studios, Milan, Italy; Nemo Studios, London, England
- Genre: New wave
- Label: Polydor
- Producer: Niko Papathanassiou

Chrisma chronology
Chinese Restaurant (1977)	Hibernation (1979)

Singles from Hibernation
- 1. "Gott Gott Elektron" Released: 1979; 2. "Aurora B." Released: 1979

Hibernation is the second album by Italian duo Chrisma, released in 1979 by record label Polydor. It was produced by Niko Papathanassiou.

== Track listing ==
Side A
No.	Title	Length
1.	"Calling"	4:52
2.	"Aurora B."	5:05
3.	"Rush '79"	4:26
4.	"Hibernated Nazi"	3:50

Side B
No.	Title	Length
1.	"Gott Gott Electron"	4:06
2.	"We R."	3:48
3.	"So You Don't"	4:15
4.	"Lover"	3:28
5.	"Vetra Platz"	3:06
