= Via del Campo =

Via Del Campo is a paved road that crosses the carruggi in Genoa city centre.

This street is well known for being the inspiration for Fabrizio De André's song (played with Enzo Jannacci) named "Via del Campo", belonging to his Volume 1 album.

The street was also mentioned by Amália Rodrigues in her song "La casa in via del campo".

== Guide ==
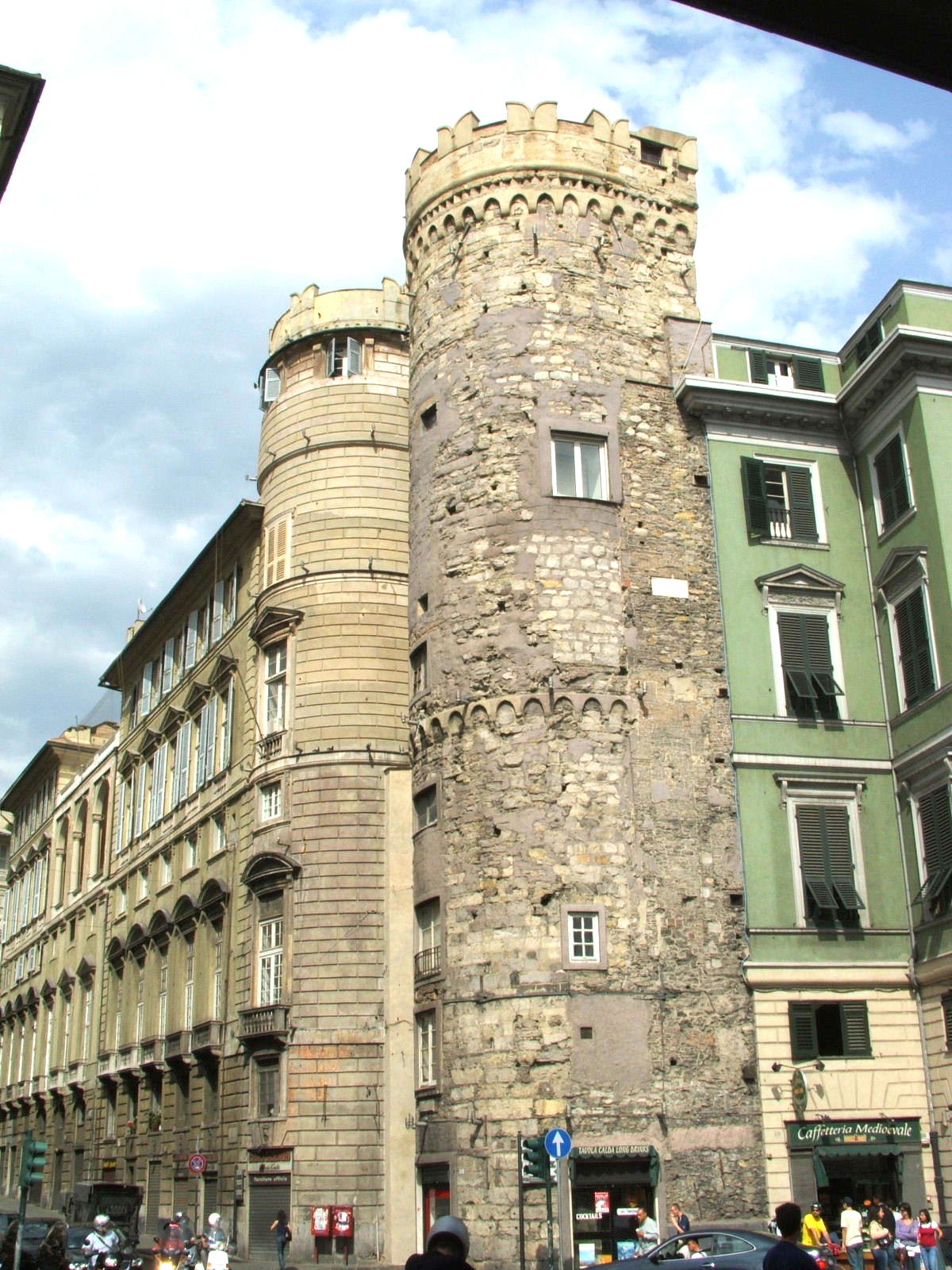
Porta dei Vacca

A long time ago, the street was a trafficking place and a brothel (it usually took place in warehouses or in the famous "locked" houses). Nowadays the street has lost much of its previous meaning and its sinful atmosphere. After ten years, it is now a ring that makes a chain for the old Vacca's door, a famous stop for tourists, that connects the modern seafront of the city to the old harbour (recently remodelled by Renzo Piano).

The parallel street is via di Prè, named after the Commenda di san Giovanni di Prè.

In the middle of the street, there is Vacchero square, where one can find "la Colonna infame" (made after Giulio Cesare Vacchero's will, which was protesting against the Genoa’s republic ).

At the beginning of the street, there is a pedestrian side in fossatello square, where via lomellini starts and there is Giuseppe Mazzini’s native house, now assigned to a Risorgimento museum.

== The memory of De André in Via del Campo ==
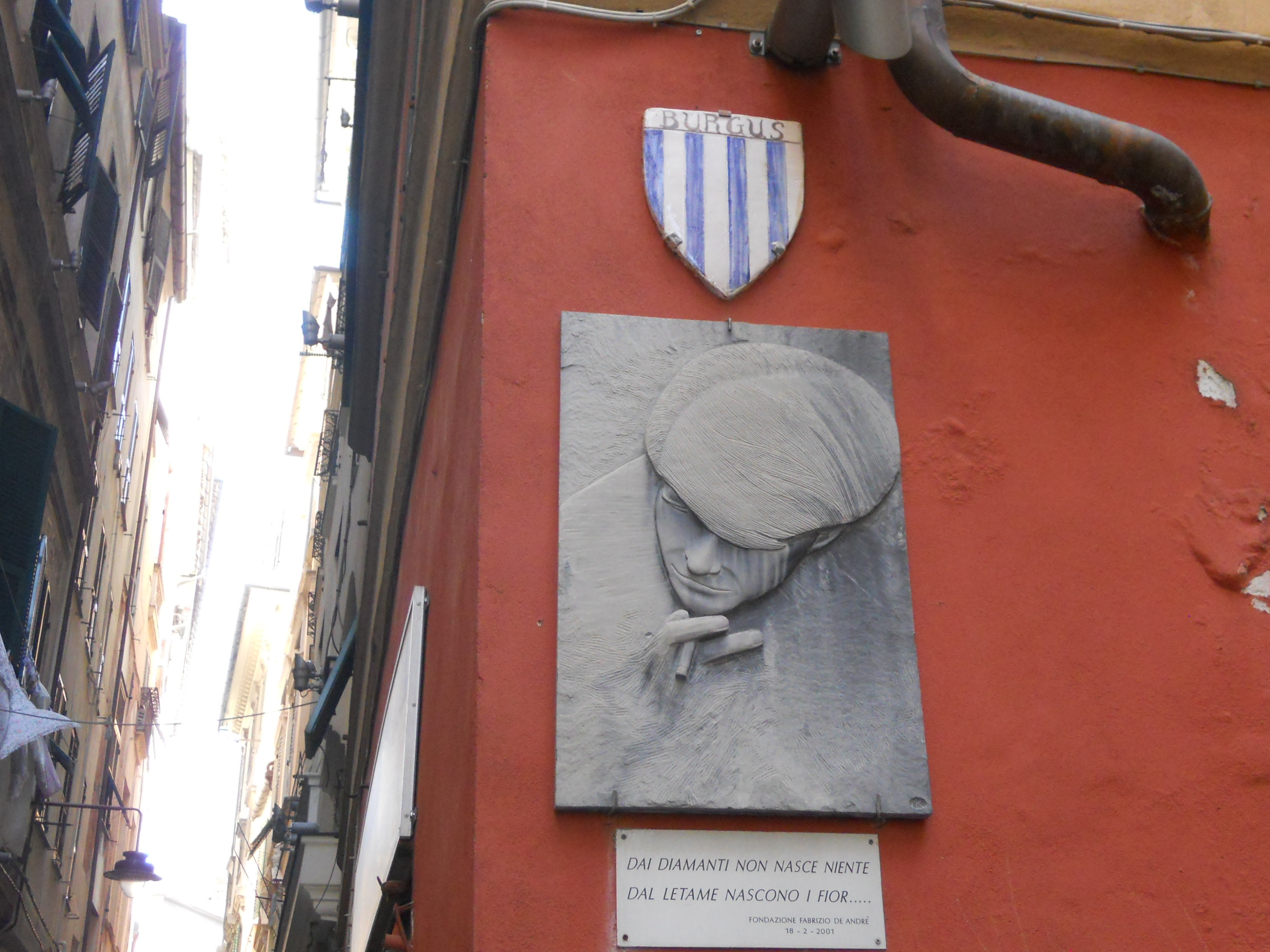
Plaque in Via Del Campo dedicated to Fabrizio De André

In via del Campo, there is the record store that belongs to Gianno Tassio, a good friend of Fabrizio De Andre, who loved the store since his youth.

The commercial hub makes a sort of museum: the people who walk by it can listen to all Faber songs while they can see through the windows the whole records’ collection. Inside the shop, there is De André's famous guitar. It was bought by Giovanni Tassio with all the generous support of the city for the Emergency association. They actually gathered funds for the value of 168 million and 500,000 lire. The money was used to build a new hospital in Sierra Leone, that has been named after De André.

Gianni Tassio died in 2004. His work was led by his wife, Daniela Tassio, until 24 February 2010. The old shop was closed for two years and then the city district bought it and opened it again in 2012 as a multimedia museum dedicated to Fabrizio De André. Its name is Via del Campo 29 rosso.

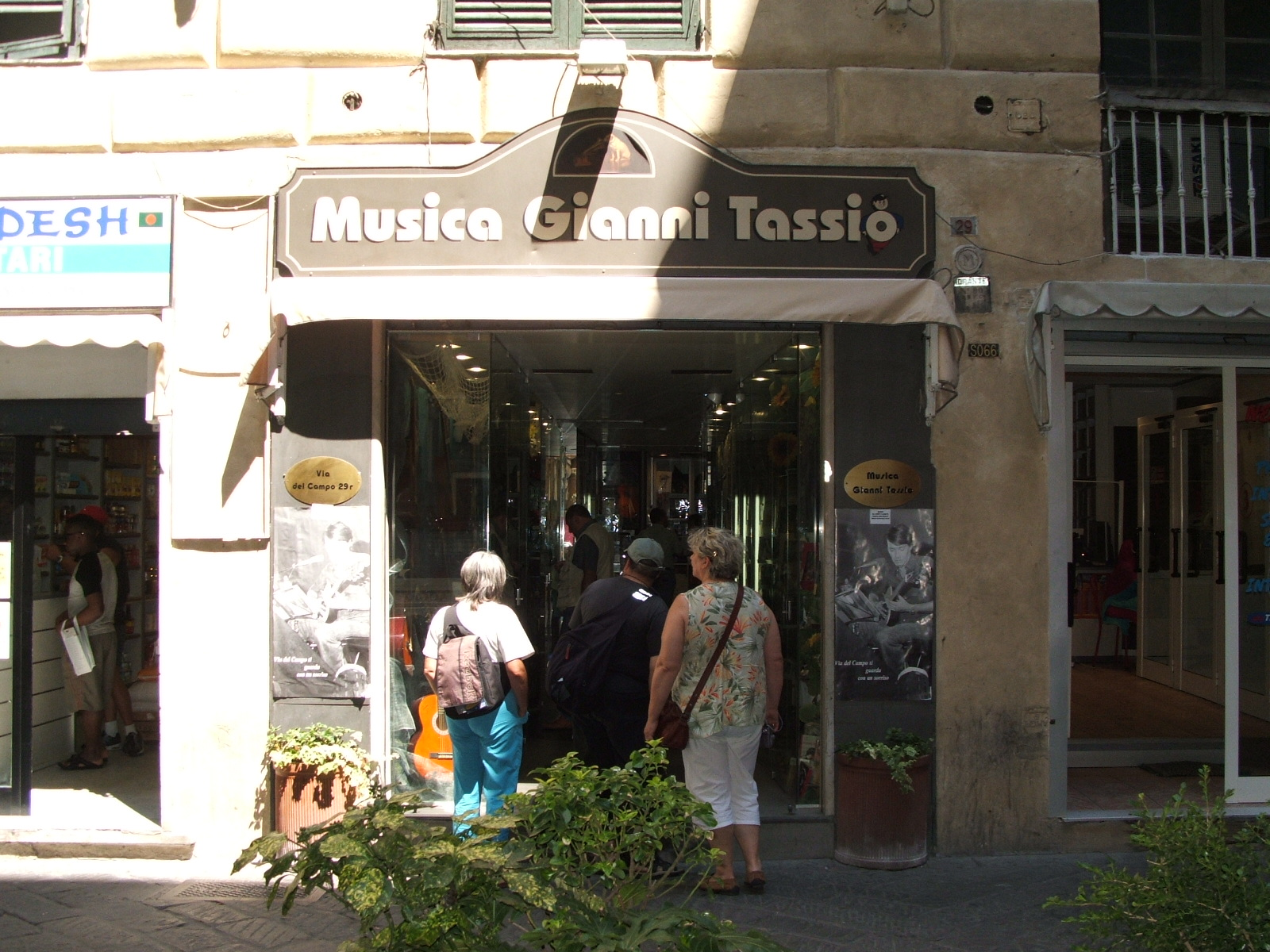
the museum-store dedicated to Fabrizio De André
