= My Mother's Friend =

1975 film

- Directed by: Mauro Ivaldi
- Screenplay by: Giorgio Cristallini
- Starring: Barbara Bouchet; Carmen Villani
- Cinematography: Gino Santini
- Edited by: Carlo Reali
- Music by: Alberto Baldan Bembo
- Release date: 1975
- Countries: Italy; Colombia
- Language: Italian

My Mother's Friend (Italian: L'amica di mia madre, Spanish: La amiga de mi madre) is a 1975 commedia sexy all'italiana film directed by Mauro Ivaldi and starring Barbara Bouchet and Carmen Villani.

== Plot ==
Billy, a 17-year-old boy who is very attracted to girls, has a mother who is currently abroad. Billy, who stutters and often uses ironic rhymes to express himself, is hosting Barbara—an attractive friend of his mother’s who is temporarily going through a rough patch with her boyfriend—at his home. Billy is close friends with an attractive 27-year-old woman named Andrea, whom he introduces as his girlfriend but who, in reality, is already in a relationship with another man; she teases him repeatedly but always manages to avoid having sex with him. The young man then tries to convince Barbara to have sex with him, but without success because she considers him too young. Just when he thinks all hope is lost, Billy manages to sleep with Barbara, even if only once. In the finale, Billy—who has finally overcome his stutter and more—goes to the airport to say goodbye to Barbara, who is returning to her partner, and to Andrea, who has married an older man and is leaving for her honeymoon. Billy, undeterred, immediately finds a replacement.

== Cast ==
- Barbara Bouchet as Barbara
- Carmen Villani as Andrea
- Roberto Cenci as Billy
- Raúl Martínez as Victor

== Production ==
The film was produced by West Coast Film in association with Colombian company Bolivariana Films. Roberto Cenci's role was originally intended for Alessandro Momo. Principal photography started in Bogotá on 1 July 1974.

== Reception ==
Italian film critic Marco Giusti referred to the film as 'terrible, extremely vulgar and full of absurd jokes'. Il Mondo's critic Francesco Savio described it as 'not only obscene, but also tainted by a subtle veil of racism'. The film was a box office success, grossing over 1.100 million lire, and launched the film career of Carmen Villani. It had a sequel, Emmanuelle's Silver Tongue.
