= Substitute Teacher (film) =

1975 film by Guido Leoni

- Directed by: Guido Leoni
- Written by: Guido Leoni; Sandro Leoni
- Starring: Carmen Villani; Carlo Giuffrè; Dayle Haddon
- Cinematography: Romolo Garroni
- Music by: Renato Rascel
- Distributed by: Variety Distribution
- Release date: 10 October 1975
- Country: Italy
- Language: Italian

Substitute Teacher (Italian: La supplente) is a 1975 Italian commedia sexy all'italiana film directed by Guido Leoni. The film was a box office success and launched the brief film career of the singer Carmen Villani.

== Cast ==
- Carmen Villani as Loredana
- Carlo Giuffrè as Tarzanic
- Dayle Haddon as Sonia
- Eligio Zamara as Stefano
- Gisela Hahn as Gym Teacher
- Alvaro Brunetti as Sergio
- Giusi Raspani Dandolo as Professor Teresa Scifuni
- Giacomo Furia as Director
- Gastone Pescucci as Janitor
- Tom Felleghy as Professor
- Ilona Staller as Student
- Gloria Piedimonte as Student
- Attilio Dottesio as Priest

== See also ==
- List of Italian films of 1975
