= Emmanuelle's Silver Tongue =

1976 film

- Directed by: Mauro Ivaldi
- Screenplay by: Mauro Ivaldi; Guido Leoni
- Starring: Carmen Villani; Nadia Cassini
- Cinematography: Gino Santini
- Edited by: Carlo Reali
- Music by: Alberto Baldan Bembo
- Release date: 1976
- Country: Italy
- Language: Italian

Emmanuelle's Silver Tongue (Italian: Ecco lingua d'argento, lit. 'Here is silver tongue') is a 1976 commedia sexy all'italiana film co-written and directed by Mauro Ivaldi and starring Carmen Villani and Nadia Cassini. It is the sequel of My Mother's Friend.

== Plot ==
Billy rushes to the airport to meet his friend Andrea, who is returning from Paris with her husband. But Billy’s happiness is immediately shattered when he learns that, at Andrea’s request, he must host Bobby—who is in love with Andrea—and Dr. Emmanuelle, Bobby’s friend, at his home. Dr. Emmanuelle will try in vain to cure him of his uncontrollable desire for women, even going so far as to give herself to him after hypnotizing him. After realizing that Bobby wasn’t the right man for her, Andrea falls in love with Billy.

== Cast ==
- Carmen Villani as Andrea
- Nadia Cassini as Emmanuelle
- Roberto Cenci as Billy
- Gianfranco D'Angelo as Roberto 'Bobby' De Michelis
- Enzo Andronico as the Opium Den Owner

== Production ==
The sequel of My Mother's Friend, it was produced by Summit Cinematografica. It initially had the working title Vieni qui al caldo... ('Come here to the warmth...'), which was later changed to Lingua d'argento ('Silver tongue'). The film was rejected twice by the censors before undergoing cuts and a title change. The film was shot on the Tunisian island of Djerba.

== Reception ==
The film was a box office success, grossing about 760 million lire. Corriere della Sera film critic Giovanna Grassi described it as 'just another cinematographic abortion', an 'abyss of tedious stupidity' with 'a vulgar screenplay stuffed with clichés and dime-store psychology'.
