= Tutti morimmo a stento =

Studio album by Fabrizio De André
- Released: November 1968
- Recorded: August 1968
- Studios: RCA Italiana studios, Rome
- Genre: Folk
- Length: 33:41
- Label: Bluebell Records (BB LP 32)
- Producers: Gian Piero Reverberi; Giorgio Agazzi

Fabrizio De André chronology
Vol. 1° (1967)	Tutti morimmo a stento (1968)	Vol. 3° (1968)

Tutti morimmo a stento (Full title: Tutti morimmo a stento (cantata in Si minore per solo, coro e orchestra), (translatable as We All Barely Died or We All Died Agonizingly)) is the second album and the third studio release by Fabrizio De André, issued in 1968 by Bluebell Records. The album, whose lyrics are inspired by the poetry of François Villon, is considered one of the first concept albums to be produced in Italy.

== Track listing ==
All lyrics are written by Fabrizio De André, except where indicated.; all music is composed by Fabrizio De André and Gian Piero Reverberi.

No.	Title	Lyrics	Length
1.	"Cantico dei drogati [Junkies' canticle]"	De André, Riccardo Mannerini	7:06
2.	"Primo intermezzo [First interlude]"		1:58
3.	"Leggenda di Natale [Legend of Christmas]"		3:13
4.	"Secondo intermezzo [Second interlude]"		1:57
5.	"Ballata degli impiccati [Hanged men's ballad]"	De André, Giuseppe Bentivoglio	4:21
6.	"Inverno [Winter]"		4:11
7.	"Girotondo [Ring a Ring o' Roses]"		3:08
8.	"Terzo intermezzo [Third interlude]"		2:12
9.	"Recitativo (Due invocazioni e un atto d'accusa) [Recitative (Two invocations and an accusation)]"		0:47
10.	"Corale (Leggenda del re infelice) [Chorale (Legend of the unhappy king)]"		4:59

=== The English version ===
In 1969, Italian producer Antonio Casetta had the idea to realize an English version of the record, so De André re-recorded the vocal tracks. This version was never officially released and the only printed copy was thought to be lost until 2007, when a U.S. collector revealed that it had been in his possession for almost 40 years. A single of two of the English tracks, "Ring Around the H-Bomb / Winter (Inverno)", on Ecco Productions (45-3), manufactured by Haddon Record Corp., is in the archive of the Vietnam War Song Project, edited by Justin Brummer, with the songs posted on the YouTube channel "Post-War American Political Songs", which says "Purchased the 7" vinyl record from an Illinois, USA record dealer in July 2021 for $9".

Tutti morimmo a stento English version track list
No.	Title	Length
1.	"Lament of the Junkie"	7:06
2.	"First Intermezzo"	1:58
3.	"Legend of Christmas"	3:14
4.	"Second Intermezzo"	1:57
5.	"Ballad of the Hanged"	4:21
6.	"Winter"	4:11
7.	"Ring Around the H-Bomb"	3:08
8.	"Relativity"	5:45

== The songs ==
=== "Cantico dei drogati" ===
The opener of the album is based on a Riccardo Mannerini poem titled "Eroina" ("Heroin").
The protagonist of the song is a drug addict who, on the verge of death, imagines seeing glass pixies, the bounds of infinity and the sound of silence. In his last moment, he seems to regret his ways, seeing his drug addiction as a coward's escape from reality.

=== "Primo intermezzo" ===
This is the first of three short interludes on the album, all featuring poetical lyrics over the same melody, each of which follows the same lyrical theme as the preceding song. This one continues with the theme of psychedelic visions.

=== "Leggenda di Natale" ===
A free rewrite of "Le Père Noël et la Petite Fille", a Georges Brassens song from 1960, "Leggenda di Natale" is about the loss, destruction and violation of innocence, told through the story of a girl who remembers her childhood, during which she was raped by an unknown man. All this is expressed in a very resigned, poetical style, without saying anything explicitly.

=== "Secondo intermezzo" ===
Similar to the first interlude, this second one continues the theme of the previous song, describing the girl's lost innocence as a dying flower.

=== "Ballata degli impiccati" ===
A slow, dirge-like folk ballad, "Ballata degli impiccati" is closely related to a poem, Ballade des pendus, written in 1462 by French poet François Villon while waiting for his execution. However, while Villon asks for pity for the condemned, those in the lyrics of De André and Bentivoglio express rancor for the ones who judged, buried, and even remembered, all of whom will inevitably also meet their ends. These condemned men are unrepentant, and in death sit in judgment against the cruelty of capital punishment, waiting to restart their "suspended discourse" until joined in death by those who sent them there.

=== "Inverno" ===
A heavily orchestrated rock ballad, alternating soft and loud dynamics between verses and choruses, "Inverno" is against the pursuit of guarantees regarding love, as if love were like an automobile. One must remain open to love, but without trying to condition when it might arise and when it might die.

=== "Girotondo" ===
This is a darkly ironical song, including some nonsense lyrics (marcondiro 'ndera, marcondiro 'ndà) traditionally used by Italian children during Ring a Ring o' Roses playground games, as a refrain. The bulk of the lyrics, though, are all-but-nonsense, in that they describe the impending start of a nuclear war and the consequent annihilation of mankind. At the end of the song, children are implied to be the only survivors and sing about "playing war games", re-starting the loop. De André sings together with the children's choir I Piccoli Cantori.

=== "Terzo intermezzo" ===
Like the two preceding interludes, this third one expands on the theme of the previous song, namely war, by painting a bleak and discomforting picture of a post-war scenery, also comparing the devastation of war to disillusionment in love.

=== "Recitativo/Corale" ===
As the title says, this piece juxtaposes spoken verses with a chorus sung by an operatic choir - both accompanied by a chorale orchestral tune composed by Gian Piero Reverberi in the style of Johann Sebastian Bach. The lyrics, first recited by De André with a pointed, accusatory tone and then sung by the choir in a lighter, fairytale style, make the case that a merciful outlook should underpin all human affairs, as death waits patiently for each of us regardless of our station in life.

== Personnel ==
- Fabrizio De André: vocals, classical guitar.
- The Rome Philarmonia Orchestra conducted by Gian Piero Reverberi.
- All orchestral arrangements by Gian Piero Reverberi.
- Pietro Carapellucci Choir conducted by Gian Piero Reverberi (in "Corale").
- "I Piccoli Cantori" Children Choir (in "Girotondo").
