= Carmen Villani =

Italian pop singer

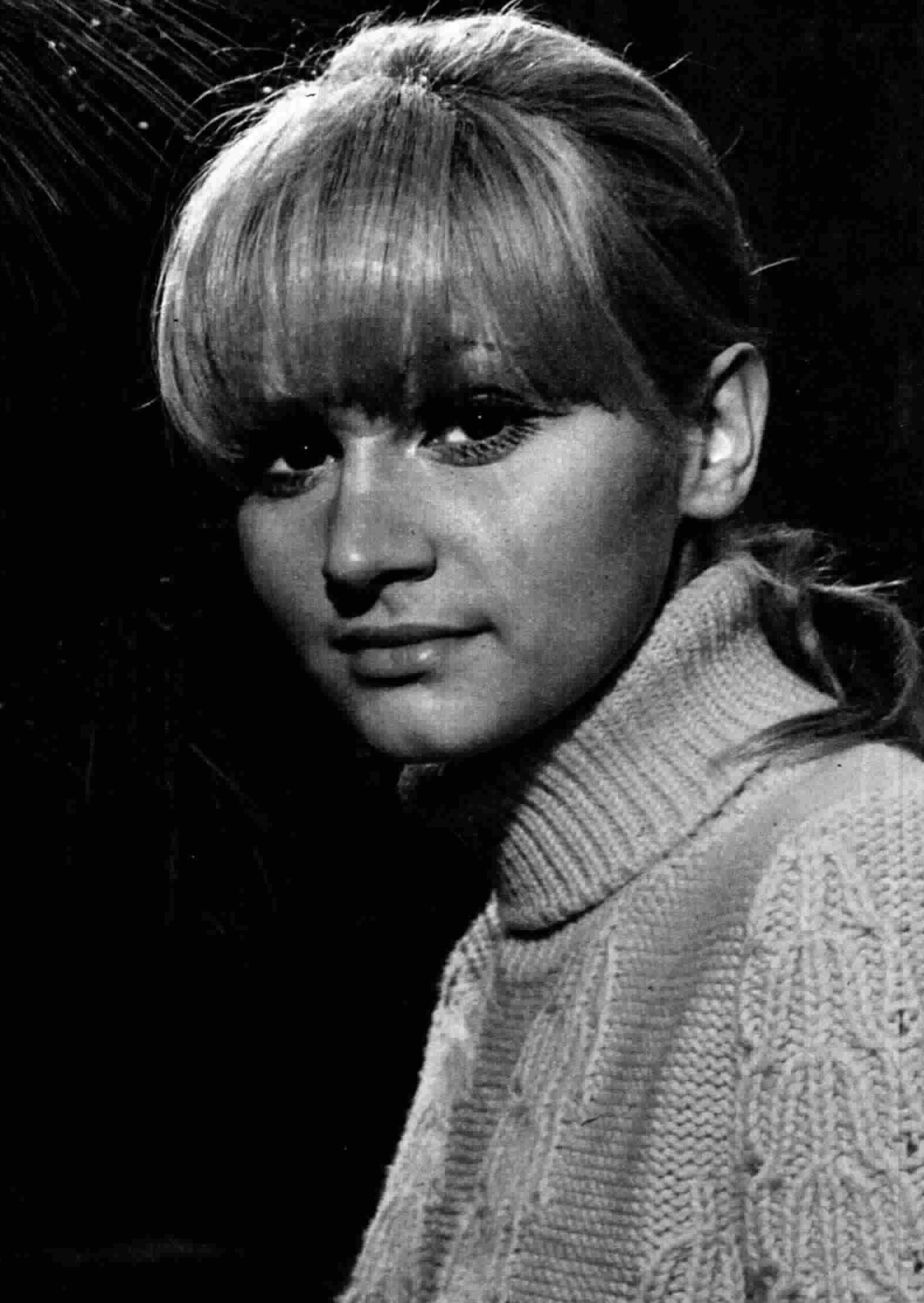

Background information
- Born: 21 May 1944 (age 82); Ravarino, Modena, Kingdom of Italy
- Genres: Pop, swing, beat, rhythm and blues
- Occupation: Singer
- Years active: 1959–2004
- Labels: Bluebell, Fonit Cetra, RCA

Carmen Villani (born 21 May 1944) is a former Italian pop singer. She had a recognisable voice and an outstanding musical sense. Villani was a versatile performer, featuring elements of gospel and blues. She is considered among the finest examples of the early beat music in Italy. She also collaborated with some of the top film scorers in Italy. Villani's fame was limited to her homeland, where she charted records and gave several performances broadcast nationwide by RAI. After her failure to chart hits in the early 1970s, she became an actress in commedia sexy all'italiana films.

== Career ==
Carmen Villani was born in Ravarino, Province of Modena. She won the nationwide singing talent contest of Castrocaro Music Festival in August 1959 with the swing song "Quando una ragazza (a New Orleans)" (When a Girl (in New Orleans)). Consequently, she signed a recording contract with the Bluebell record label. The two tracks Villani recorded with the label were noticed by Fred Buscaglione who hired her as the female lead singer for his orchestra called the Asternovas. Buscaglione taught Villani to sing in the American swing style which she kept to throughout her career. The Asternovas stapled for a month at the Royal Club in Naples. The collaboration ended with the death of Buscaglione in a car accident on 3 February 1960. Villani's solo career continued with Bluebell issuing two more singles in 1961. She made her acting debut as The Singer in the film A Man for Burning by Valentino Orsini, Paolo and Vittorio Taviani. As the film received the Italian Film Critics Award at the Venice Film Festival, the Bluebell used the opportunity for launching a nationwide campaign for Villani's singles off the soundtrack. This led to Villani's first Italian chart hit "Brucia" (Burning). Subsequently, she was hired by the RAI and collaborated with Lelio Luttazzi in the TV shows Strettamente musicale and Strettamente musicale and Il Paroliere questo sconosciuto. The single "La mia strada" (My Street) became No. 14 on the Italian weekly chart in the same year. Villani took part of the Cantagiro Festival of 1963, performing "Io sono così", a cover of "The Love of a Boy" by Burt Bacharach. The performance prompted an offer from Bacharach to record the Italian version "Anyone Who Had a Heart" which was turned down by the Bluebell leaving Petula Clark to enjoy the No. 21 biggest selling hit of 1964 in Italy.

=== Beat music (1964–1966) ===
The year 1964 marked Villani's shift to beat music starting off with "Congratulazioni a te". The single failed to reach the Italian charts as did her next beat records. This prompted her record label for a makeover to go with her new sound. She changed her girl-next-door brunette for a blonde hairdo and lost weight. Her clothes styling, however, failed to catch the Mod fashion integral for the beat style and the result was more of office wear. The new look was due to be presented at the Sanremo Music Festival in 1965, scheduled to perform Armando Trovaioli's "La verità" (The Truth) alongside Paul Anka (these times in the Sanremo Festival, each entry was performed twice, by two interpreters). Anka's record label pulled out of the competition as a protest, leaving Villani without a place in the contest. She went on to record the theme of The Avengers TV series with a group credited as Avengers. Villani also participated in the Naples Festival with "Io ca te voglio bene" sung in Neapolitan. Villani continued with her beat style in "Passo il tempo" (Time passes) which was used to open the Questo e quello TV programme in 1966 and made the Italian top 30 as the B-side of "Anche se mi vuoi", a cover of "Tossin' and Turnin'" by The Ivy League. "Bada Caterina", lyrics by Franco Migliacci and music by Armando Trovaioli, was the title track of the film Adultery Italian Style. The song's structure was simple and repetitive, being based on the call and response between the choir and Villani's variations of the main musical theme. That resulted in a portrait of a rebellious girl who wishes to dance all night long (played by Catherine Spaak) set against the strict rules of the adults represented by the choir. The naughty text and the cheeky beat made teenage Italian girls identify themselves with the character and to turn on the volume in the spirit of the track. Villani provided the vocals for another piece on the soundtrack called "Brillo e bollo". The track was included in the Women in Lounge CD collection issued in 2002. Villani continued in the protesting spirit, recording the track "Mille ghitarre contro la guerra" (A Thousand Guitars Against the War) and performing it at the Festival delle Rose. Her final single with Bluebell "Non c'è bisogno di camminare" marked the end of Villani's beat period. The label also issued her collection album Carmen in 1967.

=== Fonit Cetra (1967–1970) ===
The management of Villani's new Fonit Cetra record label had great plans for the singer. Her debut single, the classy torch song "Io per amore" (I for Love), written and co-performed by Pino Donaggio, became 11th in the Sanremo Festival of 1967 and charted in Italy. A series of deeply emotional ballads followed: "Grin grin grin" (written by Paolo Conte and presented in the elaborate studio set of the Diamoci del tu TV show), "Per dimenticare" (Made to Forget), "Trenta 0233". Her 1968 output included "Questa sinfonia" (This Symphony). The title track for another film, Mr. Kinky has been included in a number of collection albums. The flipside upbeat "Non prenderla sul serio" (Don't Take It Seriously) was the theme to the Su e giù TV programme. Villani returned to the final of the Sanremo Festival and the Italian charts with "Piccola piccola" in 1969. The track won the Tokyo Festival and was a big success in Japan, but remained her last chart hit to date. The rest of her 1969 output, including "Se" (If) written in the signature style by Conte and presented at the Canzonissima contest, failed to make impact on the charts. For the subsequent two years, Villani co-hosted Sunday variety shows musically directed by Gorni Kramer. Her Sanremo success continued with a 12th place for her performance of "Hippy" alongside the author Fausto Leali in 1970. Her last single with Fonit Cetra was "L'amore è come un bimbo" (Love is Like a Child).

=== RCA (1971–1972) ===
In 1971, as suggested by the Italian singer Domenico Modugno, RCA signed a contract with Villani. She and Modugno teamed up for the year's Sanremo Festival achieving the 6th place for the performance of "Come stai" (How Do You Feel) composed by Modugno. Villani's intention was to make a turn in her career, to shake off the label of light pop tunes and to establish herself as a serious interpreter. Ennio Melis, the chief of RCA Italy initiated the collaboration of Villani with the singer-songwriter Piero Ciampi. In autumn 1971, Villani qualified to the second round of the Canzonissima contest and performed "Bambino mio" (My Baby) by Ciampi. The fact that the theme of the lyrics was divorce, which was legalised only in 1974, demanded some extra courage to perform it at the nationwide televised show. Villani handled the situation delivering a poignant performance which is now considered among her best. Villani and Ciampi recorded a couple of tracks in the studio in mid-February, 1972. Thereafter, Ciampi, known for his difficult character, refused to collaborate with Villani. Later in the year, Ciampi started to work with Nada, another female singer, which concluded with Nada's album Ho scoperto che esisto anch'io. This left Villani under pressure from RCA who were expecting a commercial album while she was still in need of serious material. This led to the breakup between the singer and the record label. This also meant the shelving of the material dedicated for the album. Among the ditched tracks was "Perchè dovrei" (Why should I) by Lucio Battisti which she had already presented at the Senza Rete live televised concert in July 1972 to appear only on a compilation album of Battisti more than thirty years later. Villani's last recording with the RCA was the title track of the thriller film L'ultimo uomo di Sara (Sara's Last Man) composed by Ennio Morricone.

=== Acting career ===
Thanks to her film director husband Mauro Ivaldi, Villani moved into acting full-time, enjoying a string of starring roles in Italian sexy comedy films, such as Substitute Teacher (1975), My Mother's Friend (1975) and Emmanuelle's Silver Tongue (1976). In late 1970s, she also modelled for Playboy and Playmen magazines. She attempted a few musical comebacks in the 1980s, though without success. In the 1990s, she starred in the stage musical Roma birbona, and in 2004 she made a guest performance on the album Weekend al Funkafè by the group Ridillo.

== Legacy ==
A number of Villani's tracks have been included in compilation albums of the 1960s Italian pop music, among them Beat in Cinecittà and Women in Lounge.
