= Krisma =

Italian band

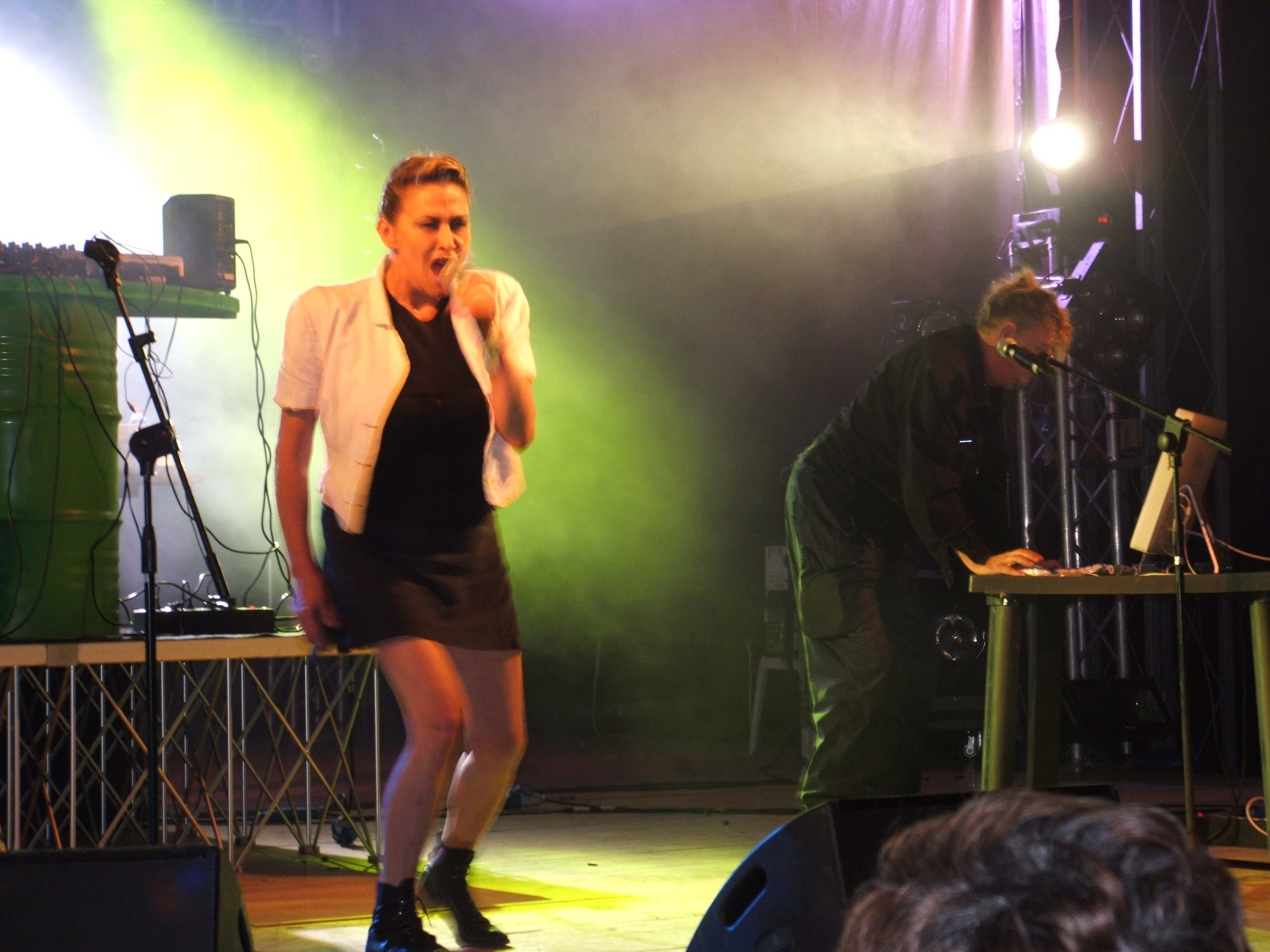
- Krisma performing in Pasian di Prato, 2007

Background information
- Origin: Milan, Italy
- Genres: New wave; electronic; synthpop; post-punk; experimental
- Years active: 1976–2015
- Labels: Polydor; CGD
- Members: Maurizio Arcieri; Christina Moser
- Past members: Hans Zimmer; Peter Maben
- Website: http://krismatv.net/

Krisma, originally known as Chrisma, was an Italian new wave/electronic music duo founded by Maurizio Arcieri (1942–2015) and Christina Moser (1952–2022) in 1976.

== Career ==
=== 1976–1979 ===
In 1976, Maurizio Arcieri and his wife Christina Moser formed the duo under the name "Chrisma" in Milan. The name was a combination of their initials. The very same year, the couple moved to London to record "U" and "Amore" with the producer Nico Papathanassiou and his brother Vangelis under the management of Anthony Fawcett. Their collaboration with Papathanassiou and Vangelis continued through 1978 with the album Chinese Restaurant and the single "Lola".

In 1979 Arcieri and Moser released their second album, Hibernation.

=== 1980–1989 ===
In 1980 the band officially changed its name from "Chrisma" to "Krisma". Their third album, Cathode Mamma, featured Hans Zimmer on synthesizer. The single "Many Kisses" was met with great success in Europe. Around this time Krisma developed the first minisequencer, known as Krismino. Krisma left Polygram for CGD, then part of the CBS group, in 1981.

In 1982 Krisma released Clandestine Anticipation, an experimental album dealing with water in all of its forms (liquid, ice, vapor, fog, snow and rain) supported by a series of videos filmed in tropical locations. The clips were first shown on Carlo Massarini's Mister Fantasy TV program on Rai 1.

Krisma moved to New York City in 1986. They directed three videos for MTV, and soon after they began to work for France 2. In Italy they often appeared on the program "Be Bop a Lula" hosted by Red Ronnie for Italia Uno. The single "Nothing To Do With the Dog" (retitled "Fido" in international markets) and "Iceberg" were released during this time.

In 1988 Non ho denaro was released. It was their last album to be released on vinyl, and today it is one of the hardest-to-find Krisma records.

=== 1991–2015 ===
During the 1990s Krisma's early records were remastered. They continued to do freelance work for the Italian state broadcasting company Rai 3, and they were credited with crafting the special effects on the Marco Ferreri film Nitrato d'Argento (1996). Krisma also designed several video-art installations and worked as consultants for Benetton's Centro Ricerca Comunicazione. On 22 July 1998, the couple launched Krisma TV, which was broadcast through the Skyplex satellite service (and later Eutelstat) to Europe, North Africa and the Middle East.

In June 2000 the band opened their website, www.krismatv.net. Arcieri made a comeback attempt with Re-Birth, a solo project, around the same time. The single "Kara" was released in 2001 in both Italian and English versions. In 2002 Krisma collaborated with the Turin-based band Subsonica on the track Nuova Ossessione.

During the fall of 2002 Maurizio Arcieri and Christina Moser took up residency at the Suite Inc. studio in Pistoia, Italy – home to Minox (with Mirco Magnani as one of the composer and founding members). An EP titled KrismaSuite was released on February 25, 2025 from this collaboration between Krisma and Minox and later Enfantronique.

Krisma singer Christina Moser died on 13 October 2022.

== Discography ==
Albums

- Chinese Restaurant (1977) (as Chrisma)
- Hibernation (1979) (as Chrisma)
- Cathode Mamma (1980)
- Clandestine Anticipation (1982)
- Nothing to Do with the Dog (1983) (released by Atlantic in the US as Fido)
- Iceberg (1986)
- Non ho denaro (1989)
- Chybernation (2011)

Singles

- "Amore"/"Sweet Baby Sue" (1976) (as Chrisma)
- "U part. I"/"U part. II" (1977) (as Chrisma)
- "Lola"/"Black Silk Stocking" (1977) (as Chrisma)
- "C-Rock"/"Mandoya" (1977) (as Chrisma)
- "Gott Gott Electron"/"Vetra Platz" (1979) (as Chrisma)
- "Aurora B."/"Hibernated Nazi" (1979) (as Chrisma)
- "Many Kisses"/"Rien Ne Va Plus" (1980)
- "Cathode Mamma"/"Rrock" (1980)
- "Water"/"Samora Club" (1982)
- "Nothing to Do with the Dog"/"Find a Friend" (1983)
- "Be Bop"/"Be Bop (rep.)" (1985)
- "Iceberg"/"Skyline" (1985)
- "Signorina"/"Hotta Choccolata" (1987)

Collaborations

- "Suffocation" – track included in Vangelis' 1980 album See You Later
- "Nuova Ossessione" – track included in Subsonica's 2002 album Amorematico
- "Odore di Polvere da Sparo", "23 Coppie di Cromosomi", "Apparenza e Realtà" – tracks included in Franco Battiato's 2004 album Dieci Stratagemmi
- "Australia" – track included in Garbo's 2006 tribute album Congarbo
- "KrismaSuite" - Krisma with Minox and Enfantronique
