= Fano Jazz by The Sea =

Annual jazz festival in Fano, Italy

Fano Jazz by the Sea
- Genre: Jazz
- Dates: Late July
- Locations: Fano, Italy
- Coordinates: 43°50′50″N 13°00′54″E
- Years active: 1993–present
- Website: fanojazzbythesea.com

Fano Jazz by the Sea is an annual jazz festival held in Fano, Italy since 1993. It is usually held at the end of July.

== History ==
Originally born as marine side event of the festival Umbria Jazz under the name Umbria Jazz by the Sea in 1991, took his current name two years later.

== Artists ==
Below is the list of some of the best known artists who have performed at Fano Jazz by The Sea since its inception, listed in appearance order, with the year(s) in brackets.

- Paquito D'Rivera (1993, 2013)
- Lionel Hampton (1994)
- James Carter (1995, 2004, 2010)
- McCoy Tyner (1996, 2007)
- Enrico Rava (1996, 2009, 2010, 2011, 2015, 2019)
- Paolo Fresu (1996, 2002, 2012, 2014, 2015, 2017, 2018, 2019, 2020)
- Michel Petrucciani (1997)
- Chick Corea (1998)
- Dee Dee Bridgewater (1999, 2006, 2012, 2018, 2025)
- Herbie Hancock (2000)
- John Scofield (2001, 2005, 2016, 2017)
- Joshua Redman (2001, 2015, 2019)
- Gonzalo Rubalcaba (2003, 2016, 2021)
- Michel Portal (2003, 2006, 2008, 2015, 2021)
- Marcus Miller (2003, 2005, 2010)
- Nils Petter Molvær (2004, 2021)
- Wynton Marsalis (2004)
- Joe Zawinul (2005)
- Richard Bona (2006, 2010, 2014, 2024, 2026)
- Maceo Parker (2006, 2010)
- Mike Stern (2007, 2012)
- The Bad Plus ((2007, 2015, 2024)
- Stefano Bollani (2007, 2008, 2010)
- Trilok Gurtu (2009, 2011, 2013, 2017)
- John McLaughlin (2011)
- Hiromi (2011)
- Noa (2012, 2016, 2022)
- Brad Mehldau (2012, 2016, 2018)
- Dave Weckl (2012, 2013, 2026)
- Brian Auger (2014)
- Fred Wesley (2014, 2022)
- Michael Nyman (2017)
- Stanley Clarke (2018, 2023)
- Terence Blanchard (2019)
- Donny McCaslin (2019, 2023)
- Jacob Collier (2019)
- Michael League (2020)
- Aymée Nuviola (2021)
- Sons of Kemet (2022)
- Louis Cole (2022)
- GoGo Penguin (2022)
- Seun Kuti (2023)
- Alfredo Rodríguez (2024)
- Ida Nielsen (2025)
- Omar Hakim (2025)
- Nik Bärtsch (2025)
- Fatoumata Diawara (2026)
- MonoNeon (2026)
