= Maurizio Arcieri =

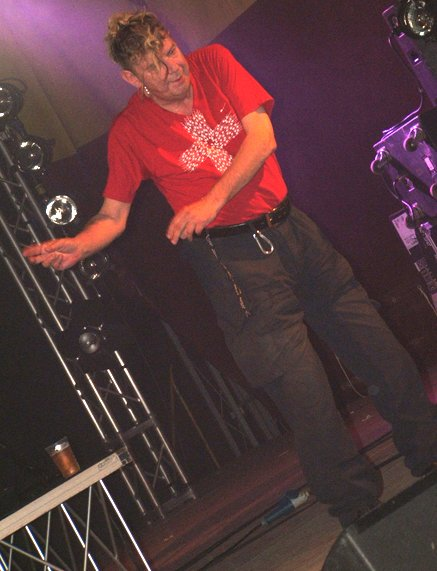
- Arcieri performing with Krisma 2007

Background information
- Born: Maurizio Arcieri; 30 April 1942; Milan, Italy
- Died: 29 January 2015 (aged 72) Varese, Italy
- Genres: Pop
- Instruments: Synthesizer, vocals
- Years active: 1962–2015
- Labels: Polydor, Saar
- Website: http://www.krismatv.net

Maurizio Arcieri (30 April 1942 – 29 January 2015) was an Italian singer who was a member of the 1960s Italian beat band the New Dada, and the 1970s/'80s band Krisma.

== Career ==
In the spring of 1967, the New Dada supported the Beatles at their Milan concert. The group eventually split. Some members of the New Dada followed Maurizio as a supporting group. "Ballerina" and "Il comizio" were released.

Maurizio participated at the "Disco per l'Estate" Festival with "Cinque Minuti e poi..."; the song is one of the greatest hits of the year and the leit-motiv of "Quelli belli siamo noi" ("We Are the Beautiful Ones"), a "musicarello" (musical comedy movie) in which Maurizio acts and sings some of his hits. The movie features - among others - Carlo Dapporto, Carlo delle Piane, Isabella Biagini, Ric e Gian and a young Loredana Bertè. Maurizio was invited as a guest in the most important TV shows of the time. Some videos of those appearances are now available. The album "Maurizio - 1970" was released.

The albums "Maurizio - 1975" (a collection of Maurizio's cool seventies singles), and "Trasparenze" (a progressive experiment) were released.

Maurizio was then chosen as the Italian narrator for the pan-European album The Rock Peter and the Wolf, a Polydor project that involves Brian Eno, Phil Collins, Alvin Lee, Manfred Mann and many others. In 2014 he also worked in the film-comedy Sexy Shop.

Arcieri died on 29 January 2015, in Varese, Italy, aged 72.

== Family ==
He was married to Christina Moser.

== Discography ==
=== Albums ===
- (1970) Maurizio (Joker/Saar)
- (1975) Maurizio (Polydor)
- (1975) Trasparenze (Polydor)

=== Singles ===
- (1967) "Ballerina" / "Non C'è Bisogno Di Camminare" (Bluebell)
- (1967) "Lady Jane" / T'Amo Da Morire" (Bluebell)
- (1967) "Il Comizio (di Maurizio)" / "Il Fiore All'Occhiello" (SAAR/Joker)
- (1968) "Cinque Minuti e Poi..." / "Un'Ora Basterà" (SAAR/Joker)
- (1968) "Era Solo Ieri" / "Ricomincio Da Zero (Natural Born Loser)" (SAAR/Joker)
- (1969) "Elizabeth" / "Sirena" (SAAR/Joker)
- (1969) "24 Ore Spese Bene Con Amore" / "Cade Qualche Fiocco Di Neve" (Polydor)
- (1971) "Rose Blu" / "Il Mare Tra Le Mani" (Polydor)
- (1971) "L'Uomo e La Matita" / "La Gloria e L'Amore" (Polydor)
- (1972) "Deserto" / "La Decisione" (Polydor)
- (1972) "I Giochi Del Cuore" / "Un Uomo" (Polydor)
- (1973) "Scusa" / "Un Giorno Da Re" (Polydor)
- (1974) "Un Dolce Scandalo" / "Il Grigio Nella Mente" (Polydor)
- (1974) "Stagioni Fuori Tempo" / "Un Dolce Scandalo" (Polydor)
- (1975) "Guardami, Toccami, Guariscimi" / "Prima Estate" (Polydor)

=== Collaborations ===
- (1976) Peter and the Wolf, Italian narrative voice (RSO, production by Jack Lancaster, Robin Lumley and Denis McKay)
