= Italian beat =

Italian beat (Italian: beat italiano), also called bitt, was the 1960s genre of Italian popular music called beat music (musica beat). It began to spread in Italy as early as 1963, when the spread of British popular music inspired many young people to form new musical groups. Hundreds of bands achieved small local hits, and some had songs that resonated with the nation. Numerous groups and soloists started and achieved success during the rise of Italian beat; record companies and music magazines dedicated to the phenomenon were founded, in addition to the creation of specialized venues throughout Italy such as the Piper Club, a nightclub launched in 1965 in Trieste, Rome, and La Perla in Turin. Musical competitions were also organized, including the famous radio and television singing competition, the Rapallo Davoli National Tournament. Over time, these groups were influenced by the spread of folk music and psychedelia, blending these influences into the genre. Towards the end of the decade more sophisticated forms of rock music gained ground, and 7-inch singles by beat groups disappeared from the national charts.

The style was characterized by rock and roll built around simple structures played on electric guitar, sometimes distorted through a fuzzbox, and often enriched with electric organ. The lyrics and vocal style were generally unsophisticated, often featuring protest themes and sometimes taking an aggressive tone. Although many of these bands were professional, many groups of the period were young amateurs. Because of these characteristics, some critics consider beat to be among the Italian popular music movements that emerged and developed from the grassroots.

== History ==
=== 1958–1963: Origins ===
==== Rock and roll and the urlatori ====
Despite Fascist restrictions on the spread of foreign music, particularly American music, the sounds of Black American musicians and big bands influenced many artists of the period. With the end of protectionism and the strong presence of the American military in Italy during the postwar period, American music became more widespread in the country. By the end of the 1950s, American major record labels were spreading rock and roll throughout the world; while in Italy, the Quartetto Cetra had already recorded a cover of Rock Around the Clock in 1956, titled L'orologio matto ("The Crazy Clock"). With the new industrial revival, electric musical instruments such as guitars and amplification equipment were becoming more accessible. EKO Guitars, founded in 1956 as GIEMMEI, played a fundamental role in this process, organizing courses and workshops throughout Italy for those wishing to learn to use the new instruments. This enabled young musicians to form small groups and perform for local audiences of their peers.

Because of the American presence, Naples was one of the first places where Italian culture came into contact with American culture through dance parties, shows, and concerts. These facilitated exchanges and cultural cross-pollination among younger generations, encouraging local interpretations of American styles and conventions. In this context, the first Italian youth rock and roll bands emerged. Willy and the Internationals, who recorded a version of Little Richard's "Lucille" for Vis Radio, were among the first mixed-race rock bands, consisting of three American students from the Forrest Sherman School and three Italians. The female youth of Naples was also beginning to experience greater emancipation in this context, as demonstrated by the formation of the Shermanettes, one of the first all-female rock and roll groups in Italy.

In Milan, by the late 1950s, Italian rock and roll performers such as Adriano Celentano, Giorgio Gaber, I Campioni, Tony Dallara, Clem Sacco, and Guidone were already performing. The Italian press called them urlatori ("screamers"), and there were also a number of female singers, including Betty Curtis, Jenny Luna, Mina, Angela, and Mara Pacini (known as Brunetta). The first dancers and choreographers of the genre also emerged in dance halls with notable standouts, such as world be bop and rock and roll champion Bruno Dossena prior to his tragic death in a car accident on 17 April 1958.

In 1960, I Ribelli recorded two singles with British rock and roll singer Colin Hicks: "Love's Made a Fool of You" and "Garden of Eden / For Every Boy", both released by Broadway International the same year. In 1961, Adriano Celentano founded his own record label, Clan Celentano. Its artists included I Ribelli, I Fuggiaschi, and I Satelliti, who worked as backing bands for Celentano, Don Backy, and Ricky Gianco, respectively.

==== Yé-yé music ====
In the early 1960s, singers of the so-called yé-yé music began their careers. It was a musical genre characterized by very light twist and rock and roll influences and pop, with an energetic and optimistic style. Its singers were mostly young, clean-cut performers, often with somewhat awkward and simple movements. In 1961, Rosanna Negiri (known as Rosy) released Patatina / Dove through the Nuova Enigmistica Tascabile, but the most prominent performers were undoubtedly Gianni Morandi, who at the age of 16 had already released Fatti mandare dalla mamma a prendere il latte / Meglio il madison (RCA Italiana, 1962), and Rita Pavone with La partita di pallone / Amore twist (RCA Victor, 1962).

==== Early examples of Italian beat ====
In the Italian recording industry, the first influences of the emerging British beat arrived even before the British Invasion. I Fuggiaschi were already active in 1960, but their first release without Don Backy did not come until 1965, with It's a Long, Long Way to Tipperary, simply titled Tipperary.

In 1963, Fausto Leali recorded a cover of Please Please Me by the Beatles on the single Please Please Me / 5 giorni (Jolly Hi-Fi Records). Ricky Gianco included a cover of From Me to You on his album Una giornata con Ricky Gianco (Jaguar Records, 1963), under the Italian title Cambia Tattica.

Although the new wave was spreading increasingly widely, these new musical and cultural influences did not immediately find a response in the mass media, which had previously viewed rock and roll with hostility and subsequently took a hostile view of the “music of the long-haired.” Nevertheless, in 1964, the English beat phenomenon spread first to the United States and then to Italy. This was the turning point for the genre, with hundreds of bands forming throughout the country and the first beat songs entering the national charts.

=== 1964–1968: The success ===
==== The "British Invasion" ====
On 4 November 1963, the Beatles performed in front of Queen Elizabeth the Queen Mother, and the world began to talk about the new musical and commercial phenomenon to such a degree that the term "Beatlemania" was began to be used in some US media.

== Rock in Italy ==
Italy is known worldwide for its melodic "Neapolitan" singing style and has historically been highly receptive to foreign musical influences, although these influences were adopted relatively slowly.

State (then monopolistic) radio and TV, and domestic show-business executives were lukewarm, or frankly hostile to the early rock'n'roll wave of the 1950s.

Rock and roll was seen as a gimmick, or just noise for "teddy-boys" (actual term for young rogues) taste; only some mild-mannered "modern-style" singers (like Tony Renis of "When, when, when" fame) were allowed to be aired, publish records with main labels, and participate in the institutional "Festival di Sanremo" contest.

The early pioneers of rock'n'roll (so-called urlatori) had some media coverage as novelties, but soon, those who wanted to pursue a career in music business had to switch toward the traditional mainstream.

From 1961 to 1965, teenagers-oriented music was a mix of pretty-face pop, twist and French yé-yé influences.

Situation changed slightly around 1965. Notably:

Some visiting top acts, like the Beatles or the Rolling Stones

The creation of "Whiskey-a-Go-go" or "Marquee" styled rock clubs (such as Rome's Piper Club, Milan's Paip's, and Piper 2000 on the Tuscan Riviera), was soon imitated in smaller towns.

The infamous "disc-eater", a cheap 45 RPM player, that strongly boosted singles sales, and the massive diffusion of juke-boxes.

The emergence of contests and festivals, friendly to new trends, like the Cantagiro, or Davoli Contest (sponsored by instrument manufacturers and distributors).

The easy reception of powerful medium-wave foreign stations like Radio Luxembourg, Radio Montecarlo or Radio Koper allowed Italian youngsters to bypass the mediatic block, and stay updated to the latest anglosaxon trends (some radio enthusiasts even managed to catch the elusive Channel's "pirate stations" like Radio Caroline, and German TV shows such as Beat Club).

Under music executives' pressure, the state broadcaster RAI reluctantly agreed to pay some attention to the "beat" hype, and the upcoming soul/R&B vogue.

== Beat groups ==
Research estimates the number of small groups (Italian: complessi) active in Italy in 1963 — either pro or amateur, including jazz — at around 300; it jumped to 1500+ in 1968.

Some groups had the chance to hit the domestic charts, and to be remembered today, including Dik-Dik, Stormy Six, Equipe 84, Nomadi, and the New Trolls.

The New Dada band had the honour to open for the Beatles in their 1965 Italian mini-tour.

Usual differences, disputes and especially the national military service led to a premature end for the vast majority of them.

Virtually no popular Italian singer or group of the Beat era had any success outside Italy, except in some Spanish-speaking countries. This is due to their local scope, often imposed by managers; few singers were fluent in English, and "sing Italian" was the rule.

Most bands which survived to the early 1970s switched to melodic mainstream or prog-pop, and only a few are still active with at least one original member, though some acts had brief revivalist reincarnations.

== The "Brit-It" invasion ==
Some British pop acts, unable, or unwilling to face the strong domestic competition, opted to move and stay in Italy, where they were revered as "British original" numbers. Many of them spent all their career in Italy, and thus are well remembered there, but virtually unknown in their homeland. These bands developed a peculiar style, singing usually in Italian with a strong British accent.

The top bands were arguably Shel Shapiro & the Rokes, and Mal Ryder & the Primitives, who had several Italian hit singles. Other popular acts include Bad Boys, Thane Russall, Mike Liddell, Kim Brown & the Renegades, the Senate; the Motowns, fronted by Lally Stott; and the Sorrows, the only band to have also had some chart success in UK.

Foreign but non-British beat groups included the Pyranhas, Evy, Nino Ferrer and Antoine from France; Trutz Groth & the Black Stars, and the Honeybeats from Germany; Rocky Roberts & the Airedales from the United States; and Kameleoni from Yugoslavia.
